= Major Occultation =

Period in Shia Islam (since 941 CE)

In Twelver Shia Islam, the Major Occultation (Arabic: الغيبة الكبرى, al-Ghayba al-Kubrā) (329 AH–present; 941 CE–present) is the second occultation of the Hidden Imam, Muhammad al-Mahdi, which is expected to continue until his rise at the end times to establish peace and justice on earth. Although Sunni and Shia Muslims differ slightly in their interpretation of him, most Muslims believe in the figure of Mahdi owing to the numerous prophetical traditions in canonical Sunni and Shia hadith mentioning him.

The Major Occultation began in 329 AH (941 CE) with the death of the fourth successive agent of the Hidden Imam, Abu al-Hasan al-Samarri, marking the end of the Minor Occultation (260-329 AH, 874-941 CE). Shortly before his death, al-Samarri received a letter from the Hidden Imam, which predicted his imminent death, ordered him not to designate a successor, and announced the beginning of the complete occultation, in which there would be no agent. He is believed by Twelver Shia Muslims to remain responsible for the affairs of men and their inward spiritual guidance during the occultation.

The concept of occultation was already present among Muslims in the 7th century since the Kaysanites who believed Muhammad ibn al-Hanafiyya was the Mahdi. After his death in 700, some Kaysanites thought he had entered occultation until his reappearance. The Twelver theory of occultation crystallized during the first half of the tenth century AD, drawing on both rational and textual arguments. It holds that the life of Muhammad al-Mahdi has been miraculously prolonged and that the Earth cannot be devoid of God's highest proof. In the absence of the Hidden Imam, the leadership vacuum was gradually filled by faqīh jurists. It is popularly held that the Hidden Imam occasionally appears to pious individuals. Accounts of such encounters are numerous and widespread. Every year, millions celebrate Mid-Sha'ban, marking the birth of Muhammad al-Mahdi.

== Background ==
Until their deaths, the tenth and eleventh Shia Imams (Ali al-Hadi and Hasan al-Askari, respectively) were held under close surveillance in the garrison town of Samarra by the Abbasids, who are often held responsible in Shia sources for poisoning the two Imams.

Contemporary to the tenth Imam, the Abbasid al-Mutawakkil heavily persecuted the Shia, partly due to a renewed Zaydi opposition. The restrictive policies of al-Mutawakkil towards the tenth Imam were later adopted by his son, al-Mu'tamid, who is reported to have kept the eleventh Imam under house arrest without any visitors. Instead, al-Askari is known to have mainly communicated with his followers through a network of representatives. Among them was Uthman ibn Sa'id, who is said to have disguised himself as a seller of cooking fat to avoid the Abbasid agents, hence his nickname al-Samman. Tabatabai suggests that these restrictions were placed on al-Askari because the caliphate had come to know about traditions among the Shia elite, predicting that the eleventh Imam would father the eschatological Mahdi.

=== Death of al-Askari ===
Al-Askari died in 260 (873–874) without an obvious heir. Immediately after the death of the eleventh Imam, his main representative, Uthman ibn Sa'id, claimed that the Imam had an infant son, named Muhammad, who was kept hidden from the public out of fear of Abbasid persecution, as they sought to eliminate an expected child of al-Askari, whom persistent rumors described as a savior. Uthman also claimed that he had been appointed to represent Muhammad, who is more commonly known as Muhammad al-Mahdi (lit. 'the rightly guided').

Being the closest associate of al-Askari, Uthman's assertions were largely accepted by other representatives of al-Askari. Those who accepted the imamate of this Muhammad later formed the Twelvers. The other sects created over the succession of al-Askari disappeared within a hundred years.

=== Minor Occultation (260-329 AH, 874–941 CE) ===
Thus began a period of about seventy years, later termed the Minor Occultation (al-ghaybat al-sughra), during which it is believed that four successive agents represented Muhammad al-Mahdi, the Hidden Imam. The fourth agent, Abu al-Hasan al-Samarri, is said to have received a letter from Muhammad al-Mahdi shortly before his death in 941 CE. The letter predicted the death of al-Samarri in six days and announced the beginning of the "complete occultation," later called the Major Occultation, which continues to this day. The letter, ascribed to Muhammad al-Mahdi, added that the complete occultation would continue until God permitted him to manifest himself again in a time when the earth would be filled with tyranny.

== Upon the death of al-Samarri ==
The Major Occultation, a term coined later, began in 329 (940–941) with the death of the fourth agent, al-Samarri, who did not designate a successor. In this period, which continues today, there is no agent of the Hidden Imam. There is some evidence that the death of the fourth agent also dissolved the underground network of representatives responsible primarily for the collection and distribution of the religious donations. The office of deputyship was thus formally closed. Despite some uncertainty, there were likely early traditions among the Shia that had already predicted the two periods of occultation. These hadiths were previously cited, for instance, by the Waqifites in reference to the two arrests of Musa al-Kazim, the seventh Imam. Nevertheless, the prolonged absence of the Hidden Imam seems to have created widespread doubts among his followers.

== Leadership vacuum ==
As both the spiritual and political head of the Twelver community, the occultation of the Hidden Imam left a significant gap. This leadership vacuum was eventually filled by Twelver jurists (fuqaha), who remain the sole leaders of the Twelver community during the Major Occultation. Often cited to support this transition is a letter received by Ishaq ibn Ya'qub in response to his religious inquiries of the second agent, Abu Ja'far Muhammad ibn Uthman (d. 916-17). The letter, said to have been written by al-Mahdi, stipulated that

As for the events which may occur [in future when you may need guidance in religious matters] refer to the transmitters (ruwat) of our sayings (hadith) who are my hujja (lit. 'proof') to you and I am the hujja of God to you all [or "to them" in another version].

— ascribed to al-Mahdi

A few similar hadiths are attributed to the tenth and eleventh Imams. The traditions also specify that these jurists must be just and knowledgeable in Islamic law. As the absence of the Hidden Imam continued, however, the Twelver jurists evolved from mere transmitters (ruwat) of hadith to mujtahidun in order to resolve new religious questions that arose over time. Their authority also increased with time to address the need to explicate religious teachings for the community. For instance, as early as the seventh (thirteenth) century, Muhaqqiq al-Hilli (d. 1277) spent the Imam's share of Khums (a type of Islamic alms) on activities that furthered the cause of Shia, as opposed to his predecessors, such as al-Mufid (d. 1022), who often asked the faithful to save these donations for the rise of al-Mahdi.

Considering that jurists were not directly appointed by the Hidden Imam, it was debated whether their authority should extend to functions with political implications, such as declaring holy war (jihad). It was likely Shahid al-Thani (d. 1558) who first suggested that a (qualified) jurist was the general deputy (na'ib al-amm) of the Hidden Imam whose authority encompassed all prerogatives of the Imam. The transition of Twelver jurists into their new role was facilitated by the formation of Shia states, particularly the Safavid and Qajar dynasties in Iran. For instance, during the Russo-Iranian war of 1804–13, the eminent clerics of Najaf and Isfahan issued a declaration of jihad against the Russians to support the Qajarite Abbas Mirza, who was conducting the campaign. Later on, however, jurists often had to compete with the Shia monarchs for religious authority.

In sum, the politically quiescent approach of the Twelver jurists over time gave way to eventually questioning the legitimacy of Shia monarchs and even attempts to restrict their power through a constitution. This evolution culminated with the concept of wilayat al-faqih (lit. 'guardianship of the jurist') by Khomeini, the religious leader of the Iranian revolution in 1979, who called upon religious scholars to assume an active role after the toppling of Mohammad Reza Pahlavi, the last monarch of Iran.

== Doctrinal developments ==
While some traditions, dating back to before 260 (874), might have predicted a second occultation, the sources from the beginning of Major Occultation indicate that the prolonged absence of the Hidden Imam may have led many of the Twelvers to abandon their belief in him. His absence also provided a basis for renewed criticisms at the time, voiced by the Mu'tazilites and Ash'arites. These pressures likely expedited a transition in Twelver arguments from a traditionist to a rationalist approach in order to vindicate the occultation of the Hidden Imam. Abu Sahl al-Nawbakhti (d. 923), for instance, argued that the absence of an Imam does not invalidate his religion or law, as with the absence of a prophet. Concerns about inauthentic hadiths, voiced by Tusi (d. 995) and others, might have given another impetus to this transition.

Starting with Ibn Babawayh (d. 991) and his student al-Mufid (d. 1022), Shia scholars began to employ theological arguments modeled on the Mu'tazilite kalam. Of these, the principle of al-lutf (lit. 'kindness') is an example. At a high level, this principle necessitates that a prophet or an Imam should exist at any time to guide towards God, as the manifestation of His utmost kindness towards His subjects. Other Twelver arguments aim to establish that the Hidden Imam benefits humankind even in occultation, "just as the people benefit from the sun while it is covered by clouds." While the ordinary Twelvers were likely content with the traditions about occultation, the theologist approach to vindicating the Hidden Imam was mainly intended to address the criticisms of the non-Twelver theologians. The two approaches were blended together by Tusi in his substantial monograph Kitab al-Ghayba (lit. 'book of occultation').

=== Twelver doctrine of occultation ===
The Twelver doctrine of occultation crystallized in the first half of the fourth (tenth) century. In its simplest form, this doctrine states that Muhammad al-Mahdi, the twelfth Imam, did not die but has been concealed by God from humanity. His life has been miraculously prolonged until the day he manifests himself again by God's permission to fill the earth with justice. This occultation continues until the safety of the Imam can be guaranteed, and until humankind is ready to receive his guidance. During the Minor Occultation, which began in 260 (874) with the death of his father and predecessor, the Hidden Imam remained in contact with his followers through the four Babs (gates). During the Major Occultation, which began in 329 (941) and continues to this day, there is no direct communication, though the Hidden Imam still remains responsible in Twelver belief for the inward spiritual guidance of humankind (whereas his outward role begins with his reappearance).

== Visitations ==
The Twelvers believe that the primordial light of the prophethood has continued to shine through the ages in the character of the Imams. Thus the Hidden Imam is not viewed as inaccessible in the state of occultation. Indeed, it is popularly held that al-Mahdi occasionally appears to the pious in person or, more commonly, in dreams and visions. The accounts of these encounters are numerous and widespread in the Twelver community. Among these accounts are also the encounters of the prominent religious scholars (ulama) with the Hidden Imam.

The descriptions of these Twelver contacts often show the concern of the Hidden Imam for the well-being of his followers and how such encounters may prompt the believer's "spiritual resurrection," an interpretation put forward by late mystic sources. As the Hidden Imam can only be seen in the end of time, those who see him, it is argued, have attained their individual end of time. For instance, publishers close to the Lebanese Shia militant organization Hezbollah have published the accounts of some Hezbollah fighters who believed they were directly assisted by al-Mahdi in critical moments on the battlefields of the 2006 Israel-Hezbollah conflict.

== Sociopolitical impact ==
Sachedina suggests that the messianic belief in the Hidden Imam has helped the Shia tolerate unbearable persecutions under different Sunni dynasties. This belief has also often inspired social movements against political oppression. A sense of responsibility for paving the way for the reappearance of al-Mahdi, Sachedina writes, has compelled the Shia to constantly re-evaluate and improve their social circumstances.

Throughout history, a vast and deeply personal Shia literature has emerged about encounters with the Hidden Imam and his personal interventions in the lives of his followers. In recent years, according to Cook, growing anticipation for the imminent return of the Hidden Imam among the wider public has led to spread of widely-available literature about predictions and prophecies concerning his return and his just rule. For example, books about the Hidden Imam are now abundant in Lebanon, containing not only classical prophesies but also interpretations of contemporary events in relation to the return of al-Mahdi. In particular, with the 2006 campaign against Israel, the Lebanese resistance group Hezbollah published the accounts of "miraculous occurrences" that took place during the war, featuring the perceived interventions of al-Mahdi to help Hezbollah fighters. In Iraq, where many hold deep suspicions of the U.S., Cook writes that there are frequent claims that the U.S.-led invasion of Iraq was aimed at finding and killing al-Mahdi as part of an apocalyptic war against the Shia.

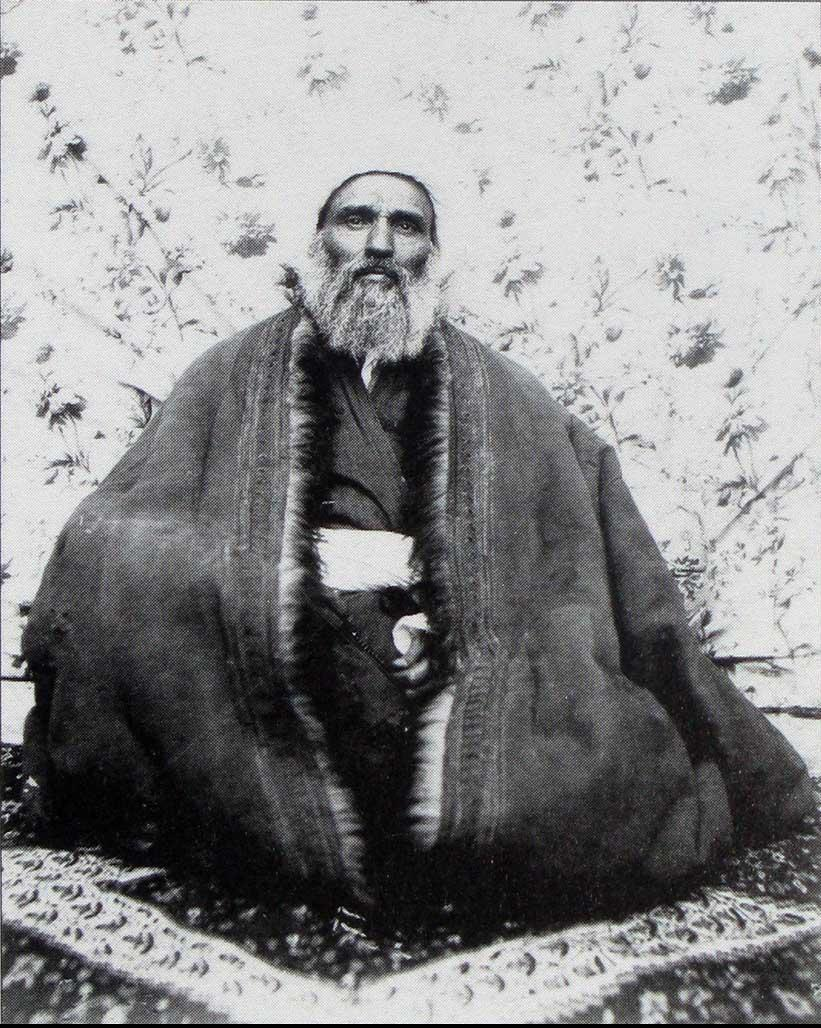
Akhund Khurasani

During the Iranian Constitutional Revolution, the top Shia jurist Akhund Khurasani and his colleagues theorized a model of religious secularity in the absence of the Hidden Imam that still prevails in Shia seminaries today. He believed that an Islamic system of governance cannot be established without the infallible Imam leading it. At the same time, he argued that a rightful religion must restrain the state to prevent despotism. He thus concluded that, in absence of the Hidden Imam, democracy was the best available form of governance, as proper legislation can prevent state tyranny and maintain peace and security. A similar view was held by Aqa Buzurg Tehrani, who argued that if there was a possibility of establishing a legitimate Islamic rule at any time, God would end the occultation of the Hidden Imam.

On the other hand, as part of his theory of velayat-e faqih (lit. 'guardianship of a jurist'), Khomeini argued that the highest and most learned jurist could legitimately form a government with a divine mandate to prepare the world for the return of the Hidden Imam. The doctrine of occultation thus played a key role in inspiring the 1979 Islamic revolution in Iran led by Khomeini, who succeeded in using the potent concepts of Shia eschatology and theodicy—such as the Shia notions of struggle against injustice and worldly oppression—to mobilize the masses towards revolutionary goals.

The former Iranian president Mahmoud Ahmadinejad often merged messianic rhetoric with populist nationalism at home, according to Kaussler, who deems that the former president believed in the imminent return of the Hidden Imam. In his U.N. speeches, Ahmadinejad combined references to al-Mahdi with a blistering Third-Worldist ideological attack on Western imperialism and Zionism intended to appeal to his audience in Middle East. Kaussler continues that Ahmadinejad and his supporters also sought to depict Iran as a chosen nation and a superpower uniquely blessed by the special favors of the Hidden Imam to lead a global mission against injustice.

In an interview in 2017, the then-Saudi deputy crown prince Mohammad bin Salman Al Saud rejected the possibility of dialogue with Iran, referring to its government as an entity with an "extremist ideology" that calls for preparations for the return of the Hidden Imam. In response, Hassan Nasrallah, the secretary-general of the Iranian-backed Lebanese militant organization Hezbollah, accused bin Salman of turning a political struggle into a religious one. He added that the belief in al-Mahdi was not specific to the Shia and that there is a consensus among Muslims about Mahdi from the progeny of the Islamic prophet Muhammad who will fill the earth with justice in the end of time.

== See also ==
- Muhammad al-Mahdi
- The Twelve Imams
- The Fourteen Infallibles
- Four Deputies
- Eschatology
  - Islamic eschatology
- Du'a Nudba
- Occultation (Islam), on the broader concept of occultation in Shia Islam
  - Minor Occultation, the first period of occultation
- Kitab al-Ghayba (al-Nu'mani), a work on the topic by the 10th-century Twelver Shia scholar Muhammad ibn Ibrahim al-Nu'mani
- Kitab al-Ghayba (al-Tusi), a work on the topic by the 11th-century Twelver Shia scholar al-Shaykh al-Tusi
- Rajʿa ('return'), the concomitant concept of return after occultation
  - Reappearance of Muhammad al-Mahdi, the concept of return in Twelver Shi'ism
  - Signs of the appearance of the Mahdi (in broader Islam)
- King asleep in mountain

== Sources ==
- Pierce, Matthew (2016). Twelve Infallible Men: The Imams and the Making of Shi'ism. Harvard University Press. ISBN 9780674737075.
- Eliash, J. (2022). "Ḥasan Al-ʿAskarī". In Bearman, P. (ed.). Encyclopaedia of Islam (Second ed.). Brill Reference Online.
- Sachedina, Abdulaziz Abdulhussein (1981). Islamic Messianism: The Idea of Mahdī in Twelver Shīʻism. Suny press. ISBN 978-0873954426.
- Daftary, Farhad (2013). A History of Shi'i Islam. I.B. Tauris. ISBN 9780755608669.
- Hussain, Jassim M. (1986). Occultation of the Twelfth Imam: A Historical Background. Routledge Kegan & Paul. ISBN 9780710301581.
- Momen, Moojan (1985). An Introduction to Shi'i Islam. Yale University Press. ISBN 9780300034998.
- Tabatabai, Sayyid Mohammad Hosayn (1975). Shi'ite Islam. Translated by Sayyid Hossein Nasr. State University of New York Press. ISBN 0-87395-390-8.
- Donaldson, Dwight M. (1933). The Shi'ite Religion: A History of Islam in Persia and Iraḳ. AMS Press.
- Modarressi, Hossein (1993). Crisis and Consolidation in the Formative Period of Shi'ite Islam: Abū Ja'far Ibn Qiba Al-Rāzī and His Contribution to Imāmite Shī'ite Thought (PDF). Darwin Press. ISBN 9780878500956. Archived from the original (PDF) on 2022-06-16.
- Holt, P.M.; Lambton, Ann K.S.; Lewis, Bernard, eds. (1970). The Cambridge history of Islam. Vol. 1. Cambridge University Press.
- Amir-Moezzi, Mohammad Ali (2007). "ISLAM IN IRAN vii. THE CONCEPT OF MAHDI IN TWELVER SHIʿISM". Encyclopaedia Iranica. Vol. XIV/2. pp. 136–143.
- Amir-Moezzi, Mohammad Ali (2016). Divine Guide in Early Shi'ism: The Sources of Esotericism in Islam. SUNY Press. ISBN 9780791494790.
- Hulmes, Edward D.A. (2013). "HASAN AL-'ASKARI, ABU MUHAMMAD HASAN IBN 'ALI (c. AD 845-74)". In Netton, Ian Richard (ed.). Encyclopedia of Islamic Civilization and Religion. Routledge. p. 217. ISBN 9781135179670.
- Halm, H. (1987). "ʿASKARĪ". Encyclopaedia Iranica. Vol. II/7. p. 769.
- Gleave, Robert (2004). "GHAYBA(T)". In Martin, Richard C. (ed.). Encyclopedia of Islam and the Muslim World. Vol. 2. Macmillan Reference. pp. 273, 274. ISBN 0-02-865604-0.
- Adamec, Ludwig W. (2017). Historical Dictionary of Islam (Third ed.). Rowman & Littlefield. ISBN 9781442277236.
- Glassé, Cyril, ed. (2008). "Hidden Imām". The New Encyclopedia of Islam. Alta Mira. pp. 178, 179. ISBN 9781905299683.
- Madelung, W. (2022). "Al-Mahdī". In Bearman, P. (ed.). Encyclopaedia of Islam (Second ed.). Brill Reference Online.
- Mavani, Hamid (2013). Religious Authority and Political Thought in Twelver Shi'ism: From Ali to Post-Khomeini. Routledge. ISBN 978-0-415-62440-4.
- Arjomand, Said Amir (2000). "ḠAYBA". Encyclopaedia Iranica. Vol. X/4. pp. 341–344.
- Corbin, Henry (2014). History Of Islamic Philosophy. Translated by Sherrard, Liadain. Routledge. ISBN 9781135198893.
- Amir-Moezzi, Mohammad Ali (1998). "ESCHATOLOGY iii. Imami Shiʿism". Encyclopaedia Iranica. Vol. VIII/6. pp. 575–581.
- Sobhani, Ja'far (2001). Doctrines of Shi'i Islam (PDF). Translated by Shah-Kazemi, Reza. I.B.Tauris. ISBN 01860647804.
- Ghobadzadeh, Naser (2013). "Religious secularity: A vision for revisionist political Islam". Philosophy & Social Criticism. 39 (10): 1005–1027. doi:10.1177/0191453713507014. ISSN 0191-4537. S2CID 145583418.
- Farzaneh, Mateo Mohammad (March 2015). Iranian Constitutional Revolution and the Clerical Leadership of Khurasani. Syracuse, NY: Syracuse University Press.
