= Four Deputies =

Messengers of the 12th Imam in Twelver Shia Islam

The Four Deputies (Arabic: النواب الأربعة, al-Nuwāb al-Arbaʿa) were the four individuals who are believed by Twelver Shia Muslims to have successively represented the hidden Imam, Muhammad al-Mahdi, during his Minor Occultation (874–941 CE). They were also known as the Gates (Arabic: أبواب, romanized: abw'ab), the Sufaraʾ (Arabic: سفراء, lit. 'emissaries'), or the Wukalaʾ (Arabic: وكلاء, lit. 'agents').

== Historical background ==
Until their deaths, the tenth and eleventh Shia Imams (Ali al-Hadi and Hasan al-Askari, respectively) were held under close surveillance in the garrison town of Samarra by the Abbasids, who are often responsible in Shia sources for poisoning the two Imams. The two Imams witnessed the deterioration of the Abbasid caliphate, as the imperial authority rapidly transitioned into the hands of the Turks, particularly after al-Mutawakkil.

Contemporary to the tenth Imam, the Abbasid al-Mutawakkil violently prosecuted the Shia, partly due to the renewed Zaydi opposition. The restrictive policies of al-Mutawakkil towards the tenth Imam were later adopted by his son, al-Mu'tamid, who is reported to have kept the eleventh Imam under house arrest without any visitors. Instead, al-Askari is known to have mainly communicated with his followers through a network of representatives. Among them was Uthman ibn Sa'id, who is said to have disguised himself as a seller of cooking fat to avoid the Abbasid agents, hence his nickname al-Samman.

Tabatabai suggests that these restrictions were placed on al-Askari because the caliphate had come to know about traditions among the Shia elite, predicting that the eleventh Imam would father the eschatological Mahdi.

== Minor Occultation (874–941 CE) ==
Immediately after the death of al-Askari in 260 (874), Uthman al-Amri (d. 880) claimed that the eleventh Imam had a young son, named Muhammad, who had entered a state of occultation (ghayba) due to the Abbasid threat to his life. According to a Shia tradition attributed to the sixth Imam, Ja'far al-Sadiq, this threat was specific to Muhammad al-Mahdi, who was expected to rise, unlike his predecessors who often practiced religious dissimulation (taqiya) and were politically quiescent.

As the special agent of al-Askari, Uthman also claimed that he had been appointed to represent the son of the eleventh Imam. Twelver sources detail that Muhammad al-Mahdi made his only public appearance to lead the funeral prayer for his father instead of his uncle, Ja'far. It is also said that the occultation took place in the family home in Samarra, where currently a mosque stands, under which there is a cellar (sardab) that hides a well (Bi'r al-Ghayba, lit. 'well of the occultation'). Into this well, al-Mahdi is said to have disappeared.

Thus began a period of about seventy years, later termed the Minor Occultation (al-ghaybat al-sughra, 260-329 AH, 874–940 CE), during which it is believed that four successive agents who represented the Hidden Imam. An agent (wakil) was variously called deputy (na'ib), emissary (safir), and gate (bab).

=== Uthman al-Amri and his son Muhammad (Year 874–917 CE) ===
Abu Muhammad Uthman ibn Sa'id al-Asadi was a close associate of the tenth Imam, Ali al-Hadi. It is reported that he was eleven when he first served as an agent for this Imam. After the death of al-Hadi in 254 (868), his successor, al-Askari, appointed Uthman as a representative in 256 (869–70). It also seems certain that Uthman became the closest associate of the eleventh Imam. Both al-Hadi and al-Askari are said to have praised Uthman as highly trustworthy. As a representative of the two Imams, Uthman disguised himself as a seller of cooking fat to avoid the Abbasid agents, hence his nickname al-Samman. It is reported that he collected religious donations, hid them in the containers of cooking fat, and delivered them to al-Askari.

After the death of al-Askari in 260 (874), Uthman performed the funeral rites of the eleventh Imam, an honor for which he must have received the permission of al-Askari beforehand. It was during the funeral than Muhammad al-Mahdi is said to have made his only public appearance. As the closest associate of al-Askari, the local representatives and the Shia community largely recognized Uthman's claim to be the agent of the Hidden Imam. However, there were possibly doubts among the Shia about Uthman's authority to collect and distribute the religious donations. In his new capacity as the caretaker of the office of imamate, Uthman also received petitions and made available their responses, sometimes in writing. The date of his death is not certain, but it is believed that he did not survive al-Askari for long. Klemm holds that Uthman died in 880 CE.

Uthman was succeeded by his son, Abu Ja'far Muhammad. As with his father, Abu Ja'far was first a representative of al-Askari. Tusi in his Rijal reports that the eleventh Imam had appointed Abu Ja'far and his father as agents of his son, Muhammad, in the presence of a group of Yemeni followers. Abu Ja'far, who served for some forty years in this role, has been credited with the unification of the mainstream Shia behind the son of al-Askari as the twelfth Imam in concealment. In this task, Abu Ja'far was assisted by Abu Sahl al-Nawbakhti (d. 923), a renowned Twelver theologian of this period, whose ties with the Abbasid court helped spread the Twelver beliefs. Among other books about Islamic jurisprudence, Abu Ja'far wrote Kitab al-Ashriba (lit. 'book on beverages'). He died in 304 or 305 (917 or 918).

Sometime after 279 (879), the office of deputyship relocated to Baghdad from Samarra, following the footsteps of the Abbasid court. Especially during the caliphates of al-Muqtadir and al-Radi, the Twelver leadership in Baghdad could also rely on the support and protection of some powerful Twelver families who were in the service of the Abbasids, such as the Ibn al-Furat and Banu Nawbakht families.

=== Ibn Ruh al-Nawbakhti (917-937 CE) ===
Abu al-Qasim al-Husayn ibn Ruh al-Nawbakhti was a close associate of the second agent, Abu Ja'far. He was also a highly respected figure in the Abbasid court because of his close ties with Abu Sahl al-Nawbakhti, the leader of the influential Nawbakhti family. It also appears that Ibn Ruh was admired among the Twelvers for his scrupulous adherence to religious dissimulation (taqiya). Abu Ja'far designated Ibn Ruh as his successor in the presence of some notable Twelvers in 917 CE. There, Abu Ja'far also added that this appointment was commanded by the Hidden Imam. Tusi in his Kitab al-Ghayba writes that the appointment of Ibn Ruh was immediately confirmed with a note from the Hidden Imam, which, according to Sachedina, may suggest that some were dissatisfied with his appointment. With this note, the communications with the Hidden Imam resumed after a lapse of about twenty-five years.

Ibn Ruh's term overlapped with the caliphates of al-Muqtader (r. 908–932), al-Qahir (r. 932–934), al-Radi (r. 934–940). He was often in favor with their viziers. However, following the 306 (918) downfall of the Banu al-Furat, the influential Twelver family in the Abbasid court, Ibn Ruh was temporarily forced into hiding and later imprisoned in 312 (924–25) by al-Muqtadir for financial reasons. It was likely around this time that an associate of Ibn Ruh, named Abu Ja'far Muhammad ibn Ali al-Shalmaghani, turned against him and claimed to be the rightful agent of the Hidden Imam, before denouncing the concept of occultation as a lie. He was soon denounced by the Twelvers and Ibn Ruh's authority was further strengthened after receiving another note attributed to the Hidden Imam. Another controversial figure was a disciple of al-Askari, named al-Karkhi, who was later condemned in a rescript, said to be written by al-Mahdi. Ibn Ruh died in 326 (937), and was buried in Baghdad.

=== Abu al-Husayn al-Samarri (937-941 CE) ===
Abu al-Hasan Ali ibn Muhammad al-Samarri succeeded Ibn Ruh as the fourth agent in 326 (937) and held the office for about three years. In contrast to the third agent, less is known about the other three agents, including al-Samarri. He is said to have received a letter from al-Mahdi shortly before his death in 329 (941). The letter predicted the death of al-Samarri in six days and announced the beginning of the complete (tamma) occultation, later called the Major Occultation (al-ghaybat al-kubra). The letter, ascribed to al-Mahdi, added that the complete occultation would continue until God granted him permission to manifest himself again in a time when the earth would be filled with tyranny. The letter also emphasized that anyone claiming to be the deputy of the Imam henceforth had to be considered an imposter. This and similar letters to the four agents and other Shia figures are said to have had the same handwriting, suggesting that they were written by the Hidden Imam. Sachedina is of the view that the Shia community lacked a notable figure to replace the fourth agent after his death.

== Duties ==
During the Minor Occultation, the agents were, in effect, the leaders of the Shia community, looking after their religious and financial affairs. The Twelvers held them responsible for collecting and distributing religious taxes, delivering religious questions to the Hidden Imam, and making his responses known in public. Some miracles are also attributed to these agents, e.g., foreknowledge of events to come, which were perceived by the faithful to be the result of their initiation by the Hidden Imam.

== Other agents ==
The number of these agents was not limited to four in early Shia sources. For instance, al-Kulayni (d. 941) in his Kafi fi elm al-din refers to written decrees from the Hidden Imam to some pious men, including the first two agents. This author also speaks of other trusted men of the Hidden Imam in different cities in addition to the four agents. The notion of four successive agents appears first in the works of Ibn Babawayh (d. 991-92) and Tusi (d. 1067). Klemm suggests that the idea of a sole agent representing the Hidden Imam became popular when the third agent was in office, then applied posthumously to the first two agents. Sachedina holds that this later stress of the Twelver literature on the four deputies (al-nuwwab al-arba') was likely due to their prominence in Baghdad, the Shia center of the time. Sachedina also suggests that the four were accepted later for expediency's sake. Similarly, Momen reckons that al-Askari's network of representatives (wukala) likely continued to operate during the Minor Occultation of al-Mahdi. There were also deputy claimants who were officially rejected by the Imamite community, such as Ibn Nusayr, who was known for his connections to the Ghulat (lit. 'exaggerators' or 'extremists').

== See also ==
- Imamate in Twelver doctrine
- Ahl al-Bayt
- Minor Occultation
- Occultation (Islam) or ghayba
  - Kitab al-Ghayba (al-Nu'mani), a work on the occultation by the 10th-century Shia scholar Muhammad ibn Ibrahim al-Nu'mani
  - Kitab al-Ghayba (al-Tusi), a work on the occultation by the 11th-century Shia scholar al-Shaykh al-Tusi
- Wikalah

== Sources ==
- Madelung, W. (2022). "Al-Mahdī". In Bearman, P. (ed.). Encyclopaedia of Islam (Second ed.). Brill Reference Online.
- Eliash, J. (2022). "Ḥasan Al-ʿAskarī". In Bearman, P. (ed.). Encyclopaedia of Islam (Second ed.). Brill Reference Online.
- Halm, H. (1987). "ʿASKARĪ". Encyclopaedia Iranica. Vol. II/7. p. 769.
- Glassé, Cyril, ed. (2008). "Hidden Imām". The New Encyclopedia of Islam. Alta Mira. pp. 178, 179. ISBN 9781905299683.
- Klemm, Verena (2007). ISLAM IN IRAN ix. THE DEPUTIES OF MAHDI. Vol. XIV/2. pp. 143–6.
- Sachedina, Abdulaziz Abdulhussein (1981). Islamic Messianism: The Idea of Mahdī in Twelver Shīʻism. Suny press. ISBN 978-0873954426.
- Daftary, Farhad (2013). A History of Shi'i Islam. I.B. Tauris. ISBN 9780755608669.
- Hussain, Jassim M. (1986). Occultation of the Twelfth Imam: A Historical Background. Routledge Kegan & Paul. ISBN 9780710301581.
- Momen, Moojan (1985). An Introduction to Shi'i Islam. Yale University Press. ISBN 9780300034998.
- Tabatabai, Sayyid Mohammad Hosayn (1975). Shi'ite Islam. Translated by Sayyid Hossein Nasr. State University of New York Press. ISBN 0-87395-390-8.
- Donaldson, Dwight M. (1933). The Shi'ite Religion: A History of Islam in Persia and Iraḳ. AMS Press.
- Modarressi, Hossein (1993). Crisis and Consolidation in the Formative Period of Shi'ite Islam: Abū Ja'far Ibn Qiba Al-Rāzī and His Contribution to Imāmite Shī'ite Thought (PDF). Darwin Press. ISBN 9780878500956. Archived from the original (PDF) on 2022-06-16.
- Holt, P.M.; Lambton, Ann K.S.; Lewis, Bernard, eds. (1970). The Cambridge history of Islam. Vol. 1. Cambridge University Press.
- Amir-Moezzi, Mohammad Ali (2007). "ISLAM IN IRAN vii. THE CONCEPT OF MAHDI IN TWELVER SHIʿISM". Encyclopaedia Iranica. Vol. XIV/2. pp. 136–143.
- Amir-Moezzi, Mohammad Ali (1998). "ESCHATOLOGY iii. Imami Shiʿism". Encyclopaedia Iranica. Vol. VIII/6. pp. 575–581.
- Amir-Moezzi, Mohammad Ali (1994). The Divine Guide In Early Shi'ism: The Sources of Esotericism in Islam. Translated by Streight, David. State University of New York Press. ISBN 0791421228.
- Hulmes, Edward D.A. (2013). "HASAN AL-'ASKARI, ABU MUHAMMAD HASAN IBN 'ALI (c. AD 845-74)". In Netton, Ian Richard (ed.). Encyclopedia of Islamic Civilization and Religion. Routledge. p. 217. ISBN 9781135179670.
- MacEoin, D.M. (1988). "Bāb". Encyclopaedia Iranica. Vol. III/3. pp. 277–278.
- Daftary, Farhad; Nanji, Azim (2014). Fitzpatrick, Coeli; Walker, Adam Hani (eds.). Muhammad in History, Thought, and Culture: An Encyclopedia of the Prophet of God (illustrated ed.). ABC-CLIO. pp. 644–649. ISBN 9781610691789.
