= Occultation (Islam) =

Shia doctrine on the disappearance and return of the Mahdi

Occultation (Arabic: غيبة, ghayba) refers to the eschatological belief in Shia Islam that the Islamic messianic and eschatological figure Mahdi has already been born, subsequently concealed, and will reemerge in the End Times. Although Sunni Islam does not hold that the Mahdi has already been born and is in occultation, the signs of his reappearance are common in both Shia and Sunni branches.

Twelver Shi'ism, the largest and most significant denomination of Shia Islam, identifies him as Muhammad al-Mahdi, the twelfth Imam, who is responsible for the affairs of men and their inward spiritual guidance during the occultation. The belief in the Mahdi remains very popular among all Muslims, owing to numerous traditions in canonical Sunni and Shia hadith.

== Twelver Shia Islam ==
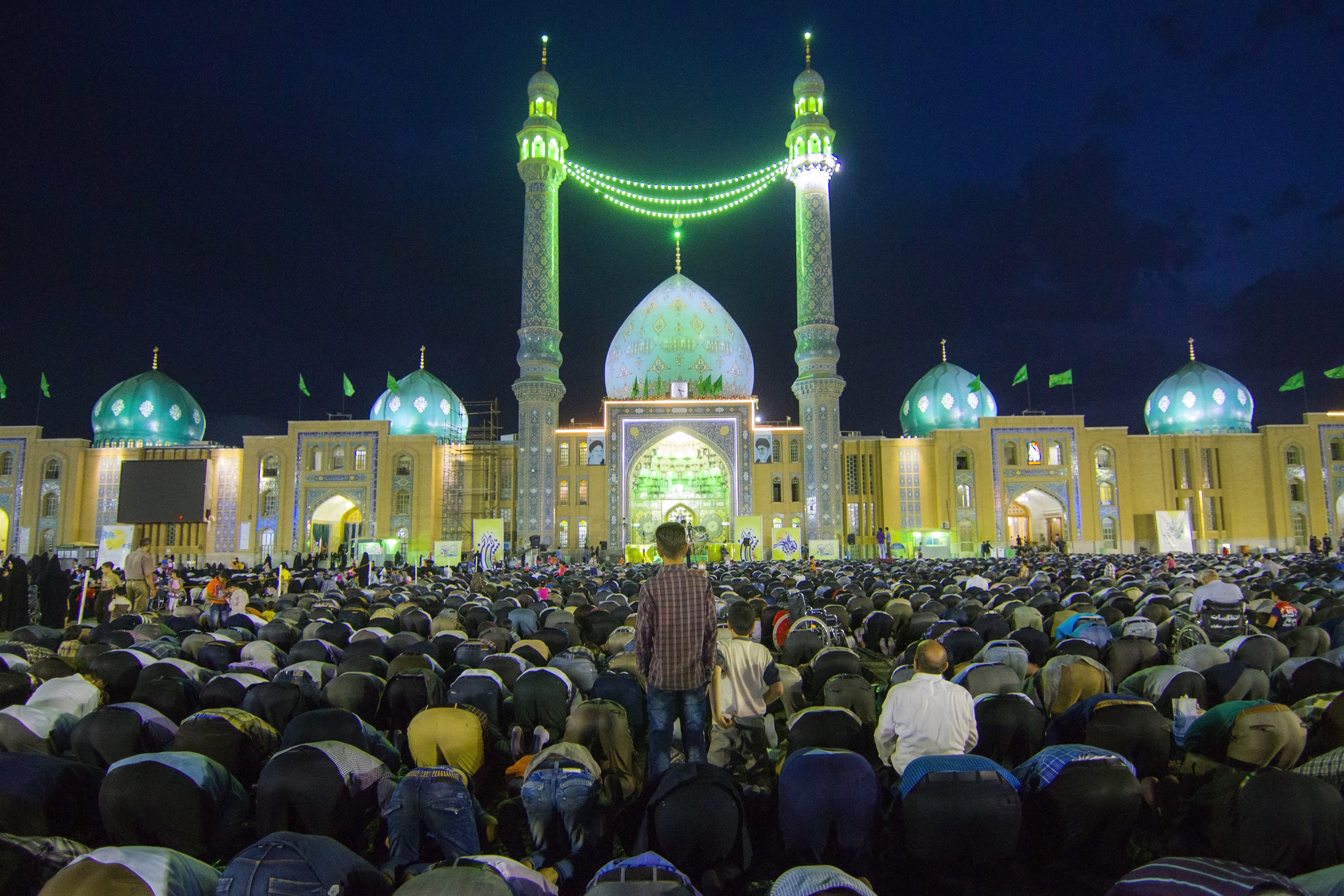
The Jamkaran Mosque in Qom, Iran, is a holy site in Shia Islam. It is believed to be the place where the Mahdi once appeared and offered prayers. Every year, millions celebrate Mid-Sha'ban at the mosque, marking the birth of Muhammad al-Mahdi.

Twelver Shia is the mainstream branch of Shia Islam, accounting for 85 percent of the Shia population. The Twelvers believe that their twelfth Imam, Muhammad al-Mahdi, is in occultation. During his Minor Occultation (874–941), the twelfth Imam is believed to have remained in regular contact with four successive agents, collectively known as the Four Deputies (al-nuwwab al-arba'). During the Major Occultation (941–present), however, there is no agent of the Hidden Imam on earth, though it is believed that he remains providentially living in his physical body until his reappearance in the end of time.

The Twelver theory of occultation crystallized in the first half of the fourth (tenth) century based on rational and textual arguments. This theory, for instance, sets forth that the life of Muhammad al-Mahdi has been miraculously prolonged, arguing that the earth cannot be void of the imam as the highest proof (hujja) of God. As another example, while the Abbasid threat might have initially forced the twelfth imam into occultation, according to this doctrine, his absence continues until initial conditions are met for his reappearance, including humankind's readiness for the message of the Hidden Imam.

=== Minor Occultation ===
Immediately after the death of Hasan al-Askari in 260 (873–874), Uthman al-Amri (d. 874–875) claimed that the eleventh Imam had a young son, named Muhammad, who had entered a state of occultation due to the threat to his life from the Abbasids. As the special representative of al-Askari, Uthman also claimed that he had been appointed to represent the son of the eleventh Imam. Possibly the only public appearance of Muhammad was to lead the funeral prayer for his father instead of his uncle, Ja'far.

In his new capacity, Uthman received petitions and made available their responses, sometimes in writing. As the closest associate of al-Askari, most of al-Askari's local representatives continued to support Uthman. He later introduced his son, Abu Ja'far Muhammad ibn Uthman (d. 916–17), as the next representative of al-Mahdi. In turn, as his replacement, Abu Ja'far nominated Abu al-Qasim al-Husayn ibn Ruh al-Nawbakhti (d. 937–38).

This period, later termed the Minor Occultation (al-ghaybat al-sughra), ended after about seventy years with the death of the fourth agent, Abu al-Hasan Ali ibn Muhammad al-Samarri (d. 940–41), who is said to have received a letter from al-Mahdi shortly before his death. The letter predicted the death of Abu al-Hasan in six days and announced the beginning of the complete (tamma) occultation, later called the Major Occultation (al-ghaybat al-kubra). The letter, ascribed to al-Mahdi, added that the complete occultation would continue until God granted him permission to manifest himself again in a time when the earth would be filled with tyranny. This and similar letters to the four agents and other Shia figures are said to have had the same handwriting, suggesting that they were written by the Hidden Imam.

=== Major Occultation ===
The Major Occultation, a later term, began with the death of the fourth agent in 329 (940–941), who did not designate a successor. In this period, which continues today, there is no agent of the Hidden Imam on earth. There were likely early traditions among the Shia that had already predicted the two periods of occultation. These hadiths were previously cited, for instance, by the Waqifites in reference to the two arrests of Musa al-Kazim, the seventh Imam.

In the absence of the Hidden Imam, the leadership vacuum in the Twelver community was gradually filled by the jurists in their new capacity as general deputy (na'ib al-amm) to the Hidden Imam. It is also popularly held that the Hidden Imam occasionally appears to the pious in person or, more commonly, in dreams and visions. The accounts of these encounters are numerous and widespread among the Twelvers.

== Isma'ili Shia ==
Isma'ili Shia branched off from mainstream Shia over the succession of Isma'il, who predeceased his father, Ja'far al-Sadiq, the sixth imam. This group either believed that Isma'il was still alive but in concealment or instead recognized the imamate of Isma'il's son, Muhammad, and his descendants. Today, Isma'ilis are divided into two groups, Nizari and Musta'li. The Nizarite imam is the present Aga Khan V, their fiftieth imam in the line of succession. The Musta'lis, however, believe that their twenty-first imam and his progeny went into occultation. In the absence of their imam, Musta'lis take guidance from Da'i al-Mutlaq (lit. 'supreme authority'). Different branches of Musta'li Shia differ on who the current Da'i al-Mutlaq is.

Before the rise of the Fatimid Caliphate, as a major Isma'ili Shia dynasty, the terms Mahdi and Qa'im were used interchangeably for the messianic imam anticipated in Shia traditions. With the rise of the Fatimids in the tenth century CE, however, al-Qadi al-Nu'man argued that some of these predictions had materialized by the first Fatimid caliph, Abdallah al-Mahdi Billah, while the rest would be fulfilled by his successors. Henceforth, their literature referred to the awaited eschatological imam only as Qa'im (instead of Mahdi).

== Zaydi Shia ==
In Zaydi view, imams are not endowed with superhuman qualities, and expectations for their mahdiship are thus often marginal. One exception is the extinct Husaynites in Yemen, who denied the death of al-Husayn ibn al-Qasim al-Iyani and awaited his return.

== Other views ==
Historically, various Muslim figures were identified with the eschatological Mahdi or used the name as an honorific title with messianic significance. These include the Umayyad Umar II and the Abbasid al-Mahdi, among many others. Similarly, mahdism and occultation are recurring themes in the history of Shia. For instance, long-standing Shia traditions were appropriated by the now-extinct Waqifites to argue that Musa al-Kazim, the seventh imam, had not died but was in occultation. Even earlier, the now-extinct Kaysanites denied the death of Muḥammad ibn al-Hanafiyya and awaited his return as the Mahdi. The Qarmatians, an extinct branch of Isma'ili Shia, believed in the mahdiship of Muhammad ibn Isma'il and his imminent return. Similar figures in Shia history are Muhammad al-Nafs al-Zakiyya, Muhammad ibn Qasim al-Alawi, Yahya ibn Umar, and Muhammad ibn Ali al-Hadi.

== See also ==
- Eschatology
  - Islamic eschatology
- The Fourteen Infallibles
- Du'a Nudba
- King asleep in mountain
- Kitab al-Ghayba (al-Nu'mani), a work on the topic by the 10th-century Twelver Shia scholar Muhammad ibn Ibrahim al-Nu'mani
- Kitab al-Ghayba (al-Tusi), a work on the topic by the 11th-century Twelver Shia scholar al-Shaykh al-Tusi
- Rajʿa ('return'), the concomitant concept of return after occultation
  - Reappearance of Muhammad al-Mahdi, the concept of return in Twelver Shi'ism
  - Signs of the appearance of the Mahdi (in broader Islam)

== Bibliography ==
- Madelung, W. (2022). "Al-Mahdī". In Bearman, P. (ed.). Encyclopaedia of Islam (Second ed.). Brill Reference Online.
- Daftary, Farhad (2013). A History of Shi'i Islam. I.B. Tauris. ISBN 9780755608669.
- Hulmes, Edward D. A. (2008). "MUSA AL-KAZIM (ABU'L-HASAN MUSA IBN JA'FAR)". In Netton, Ian Richard (ed.). Encyclopedia of Islamic Civilisation and Religion. Routledge. pp. 456, 457. ISBN 978-0-7007-1588-6.
- Kohlberg, E. (2022). "Mūsā Al-Kāẓim". In Bearman, P. (ed.). Encyclopaedia of Islam (Second ed.). Brill Reference Online.
- Rahim, Habibeh (2004). "Kazim, Musa al-". In Jestice, Phyllis G. (ed.). Holy People of the World: A Cross-cultural Encyclopedia. Vol. 3. ABC-CLIO. pp. 469, 470. ISBN 9781576073551.
- Momen, Moojan (1985). An Introduction to Shi'i Islam. Yale University Press. ISBN 9780300034998.
- Amanat, Abbas; Bernhardsson, Magnus T. (2001). Imagining the End: Visions of Apocalypse from the Ancient Middle East to Modern America. I.B. Tauris. ISBN 9780755626168.
- von Grunebaum, G.E. (2017). Classical Islam: A History, 600 A.D. to 1258 A.D. Routledge. ISBN 9781351528092.
- Nanji, Azim; Daftary, Farhad (2006). "What is Shiite Islam?". In Cornell, Vincent J. (ed.). Voices of Islam. Vol. 1. Greenwood Publishing Group. ISBN 9780275987329.
- Daftary, Farhad (1999). "FATIMIDS". Encyclopaedia Iranica. Vol. IX/4. pp. 423–6.
- Daftary, Farhad (2007). "ISMAʿILISM iii. ISMAʿILI HISTORY". Encyclopaedia Iranica. Vol. XIV/2. pp. 178–195.
- Haywood, John A. (2022). "Jaʿfar al-Ṣādiq". Encyclopedia Britannica.
- Gleave, Robert (2012a). "JAʿFAR AL-ṢĀDEQ i. Life". Encyclopaedia Iranica. Vol. XIV. pp. 349–351.
- Tabatabai, Sayyid Mohammad Hosayn (1975). Shi'ite Islam. Translated by Sayyid Hossein Nasr. State University of New York Press. ISBN 0-87395-390-8.
- Sobhani, Ja'far (2001). Doctrines of Shi'i Islam (PDF). Translated by Shah-Kazemi, Reza. I.B.Tauris. ISBN 01860647804.
- Corbin, Henry (2014). History Of Islamic Philosophy. Translated by Sherrard, Liadain. Routledge. ISBN 9781135198893.
- Amir-Moezzi, Mohammad Ali (2007). "ISLAM IN IRAN vii. THE CONCEPT OF MAHDI IN TWELVER SHIʿISM". Encyclopaedia Iranica. Vol. XIV/2. pp. 136–143.
- Sachedina, Abdulaziz Abdulhussein (1981). Islamic Messianism: The Idea of Mahdī in Twelver Shīʻism. Suny press. ISBN 978-0873954426.
- Lewis, Bernard (2011). The Assassins: A Radical Sect in Islam. Hachette. ISBN 9780297863335.
- Modarressi, Hossein (1993). Crisis and Consolidation in the Formative Period of Shi'ite Islam: Abū Ja'far Ibn Qiba Al-Rāzī and His Contribution to Imāmite Shī'ite Thought (PDF). Darwin Press. ISBN 9780878500956. Archived from the original (PDF) on 2022-06-16.
- Donaldson, Dwight M. (1933). The Shi'ite Religion: A History of Islam in Persia and Iraḳ. AMS Press.
- Hussain, Jassim M. (1986). Occultation of the Twelfth Imam: A Historical Background. Routledge Kegan & Paul. ISBN 9780710301581.
- Klemm, Verena (2007). ISLAM IN IRAN ix. THE DEPUTIES OF MAHDI. Vol. XIV/2. pp. 143–6.
