= Mahdi =

Messianic figure in Islamic eschatology

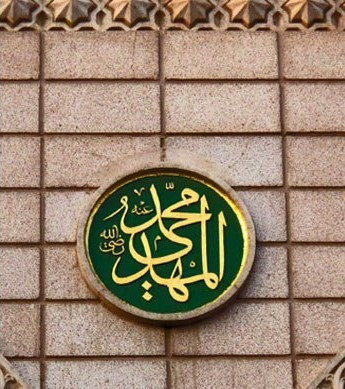
The name of Mahdi at the Prophet's Mosque in Medina.

The Mahdi (Arabic: ٱلْمَهْدِيّ, romanized: al-Mahdī, lit. 'The Guided One') is the Islamic messianic and eschatological figure, who is believed to appear before the End Times to restore justice and defeat tyranny alongside Isa (Jesus). He forms an important part of Islamic eschatology, although Sunni and Shia Muslims differ slightly in their interpretation of him. While the Mahdi is mostly developed in Shia Islam, he is also present in numerous Sunni hadiths. In Twelver Shia Islam, the Mahdi has a significant role. He is identified with the twelfth and final Imam Muhammad al-Mahdi, who was born in 869 AD, entered occultation, and remains alive until his eventual reappearance at the end times alongside Jesus. He is a descendant of Ali, the Islamic prophet Muhammad's cousin and son-in-law, and Fatima through their second son Husayn, Muhammad's grandson.

In Sunni Islam, the Mahdi is also described as a descendant of Muhammad through his daughter Fatima, who will emerge in the end times alongside Jesus. However, Sunni tradition does not identify him with a historical individual, nor do they attribute to him an occultation. The difference in Sunni Islam is that the Mahdi is a future figure who has not yet appeared, whereas in Shia Islam, he has already been born and is currently in occultation. The Mahdi has a central place in Islamic theology, devotional literature, and popular piety for over a millennium. He has influenced numerous religious, political, and messianic movements. Throughout history, there have been a vast number of Mahdi claimants. The signs of his reappearance are common in both Shia and Sunni branches. The belief in the Mahdi remains very popular among all Muslims, owing to numerous traditions in canonical Sunni and Shia hadith. It is popularly held that the Mahdi occasionally appears to pious individuals. Accounts of such encounters are numerous and widespread. Every year, millions celebrate Mid-Sha'ban, marking the birth of Muhammad al-Mahdi.

== Etymology ==
The term Mahdi is derived from the Arabic root h-d-y (ه-د-ي), commonly used to mean "divine guidance". Although the root appears in the Quran at multiple places and in various contexts, the word Mahdi never occurs in the book. The associated verb is hada, which means to guide. However, Mahdi can be read in active voice, where it means the one who guides, as well as passive voice, where it means the one who is guided.

== Historical development ==
=== Pre-Islamic ideas ===
Mahdi's advent is linked to the Christian concept of the Second Coming of Jesus, the Jewish concept of Mashiach ben David, and the Zoroastrian concept of the Saoshyant. Some historians suggest that the term itself was probably introduced into Islam by southern Arabian tribes who had settled in Syria in the mid-7th century. They believed that the Mahdi would lead them back to their homeland and re-establish the Himyarite Kingdom. They also believed that he would eventually conquer Constantinople. It has also been suggested that the concept of the Mahdi may have been derived from earlier messianic Jewish and Christian beliefs. Accordingly, traditions were introduced to support certain political interests, especially anti-Abbasid sentiments. These traditions about the Mahdi appeared only at later times in hadith books such as Sunan Abi Dawud and Sunan al-Tirmidhi, but are absent from the early works of Muhammad al-Bukhari and Muslim ibn al-Hajjaj.

A historical hypothesis in comparative religion, championed by orientalists such as James Darmesteter and Ignaz Goldziher, suggests that the concept of The Mahdi—particularly in its eschatological and metaphysical dimensions—was structurally influenced by the ancient Zoroastrian savior myth of Saoshyant. Proponents of this hypothesis argue that because the Quran lacks explicit mention of the Mahdi and early Sunni Hadith literature provides limited metaphysical details, a theological vacuum was left in Islamic eschatology; this vacuum allegedly allowed Persian society, following the Muslim conquest of Persia, to project the mythological attributes of Saoshyant (such as pre-existence, occultation, and the cosmic renewal of the universe) onto general prophetic traditions regarding a reformer from Muhammad's lineage.

Conversely, Islamic scholars reject this influence hypothesis, asserting the prophetic authenticity of Mahdism based on mutawatir (successive) traditions, and interpret these structural similarities as a distorted "early divine prophecy" preserved in ancient faiths. Furthermore, historians note that this influence hypothesis weakens significantly when applied to the traditional Sunni view of the Mahdi, which conceptualizes him strictly as a human leader and historical reformer operating under natural laws, entirely stripped of the theosophical and metaphysical attributes assigned to the Zoroastrian savior.

In Islamic eschatology, particularly within Shīʿite traditions, various titles and names are attributed to the promised messianic figure, Imam al-Mahdi, to identify him as the universal savior prophesied in ancient civilizations. In his prominent work Al-Najm al-Thaqib (The Piercing Star), the Shīʿite scholar Mirza Husain Noori Tabarsi cites a treatise titled Dhakhirat al-Albab. According to this account, the Mahdi is mentioned across different ancient languages and scriptures. Specifically, the text records that in a book referred to as "Ista' " (interpreted by scholars as a corruption of the Zoroastrian holy text, the Avesta), the Mahdi is prophesied under the names "Bahram" (a Middle Persian term signifying the divinity of victory and the smiter of resistance) and "Bande Yazdan" (literally meaning "Servant of God" or Abdullah).

=== Origin ===
The term al-Mahdi was employed from the beginning of Islam, but only as an honorific epithet ("the guide") and without any messianic significance. As an honorific, it was used in some instances to describe Muhammad (by Hassan ibn Thabit), Abraham, al-Husayn, and various Umayyad caliphs (هداة مهديون, hudat mahdiyyun). During the Second Muslim Civil War (680–692), after the death of Mu'awiya I (r. 661–680), the term acquired a new meaning of a ruler who would restore Islam to its perfect form and restore justice after oppression. Abd Allah ibn al-Zubayr, who laid claim to the caliphate against the Umayyads and found temporary success during the civil war, presented himself in this role. Although the title Mahdi was not applied to him, his career as the anti-caliph significantly influenced the future development of the concept. A hadith was promulgated in which Muhammad prophesies the coming of a just ruler. (Note: D. S. Atema first dated this hadith to between Yazid's death and Ibn al-Zubayr's death. Wilferd Madelung narrowed this down to 684, just after the death of Yazid. Michael Cook and David Cook have contested Madelung's dating. It is nevertheless generally accepted that the hadith is patterned on Ibn al-Zubayr's career. David Cook further states that the latter part of the hadith is totally legendary and is unrelated to Ibn al-Zubayr.)

There will arise a difference after the death of a caliph, and a man of the people of Medina will go forth fleeing to Mecca. Then some of the people of Mecca will come to him and will make him rise in revolt against his will ... An expedition will be sent against him from Syria but will be swallowed up ... in the desert between Mecca and Medina. When the people see this, the righteous men ... of Syria and ... Iraq will come to him and pledge allegiance to him. Thereafter a man of the Quraysh will arise whose maternal uncles are of Kalb. He will send an expedition against them, but they will defeat them ... He will then divide the wealth and act among them according to the Sunna of their Prophet. Islam will settle down firmly on the ground ... He will stay seven years and then die, and the Muslims will pray over him.

Refusing to recognize the new caliph, Yazid I (r. 680–683), after Mu'awiya's death in 680, Ibn al-Zubayr had fled to the Meccan sanctuary. From there he launched anti-Umayyad propaganda, calling for a shura of the Quraysh to elect a new caliph. Those opposed to the Umayyads were paying him homage and asking for the public proclamation of his caliphate, forcing Yazid to send an army to dislodge him in 683. After defeating rebels in the nearby Medina, the army besieged Mecca but was forced to withdraw as a result of Yazid's sudden death shortly afterward. Ibn al-Zubayr was recognized caliph in Arabia, Iraq, and parts of Syria, where Yazid's son and successor Mu'awiya II (r. 683–684) held power in Damascus and adjoining areas. The hadith hoped to enlist support against an expected Umayyad campaign from Syria. The Umayyads did indeed send another army to Mecca in 692, but contrary to the hadith's prediction was successful in removing Ibn al-Zubayr. The hadith lost relevance soon afterward, but resurfaced in the Basran hadith circles a generation later, this time removed from its original context and understood as referring to a future restorer.

Around the time when Ibn al-Zubayr was trying to expand his dominion, the pro-Alid revolutionary al-Mukhtar al-Thaqafi took control of the Iraqi garrison town of Kufa in the name of Ali's son Muhammad ibn al-Hanafiyya, whom he proclaimed as the Mahdi in the messianic sense. The association of the name Muhammad with the Mahdi seems to have originated with Ibn al-Hanafiyya, who also shared the epithet Abu al-Qasim with Muhammad, the Islamic prophet. Among the Umayyads, the caliph Sulayman ibn Abd al-Malik (r. 715–717) encouraged the belief that he was the Mahdi, and other Umayyad rulers, like Umar ibn Abd al-Aziz (r. 717–720), have been addressed as such in the panegyrics of Jarir (d. 728) and al-Farazdaq (d. 728–730).

Early discussions about the identity of the Mahdi by religious scholars can be traced back to the time after the Second Fitna. These discussions developed in different directions and were influenced by traditions (hadith) attributed to Muhammad. In Umayyad times, scholars and traditionists not only differed on which caliph or rebel leader should be designated as Mahdi but also on whether the Mahdi is a messianic figure and if signs and predictions of his time had been satisfied. In Medina, among the conservative religious circles, the belief in Umar ibn Abd al-Aziz being the Mahdi was widespread. Said ibn al-Musayyib (d. 715) is said to have identified Umar ibn Abd al-Aziz as the Mahdi long before his reign. The Basran, Abu Qilabah, supported the view that Umar ibn Abd al-Aziz was the Mahdi. Hasan al-Basri (d. 728) opposed the concept of a Muslim Messiah but believed that if there was the Mahdi, it was Umar ibn Abd al-Aziz.

By the time of the Abbasid Revolution in 750, Mahdi was already a known concept. Evidence shows that the first Abbasid caliph al-Saffah (r. 750–754) assumed the title of "the Mahdi" for himself.

=== Shia Islam ===
In Shia Islam, the eschatological Mahdi was commonly given the epithet al-Qa'im (القائم), which can be translated as 'he who will rise,' signifying his rise against tyranny in the end of time. Distinctively Shia is the notion of temporary absence or occultation of the Mahdi, whose life has been prolonged by divine will. An intimately related Shia notion is that of raj'a (lit. 'return'), which often means the return to life of (some) Shia Imams, particularly Husayn ibn Ali, to exact their revenge on their oppressors.

Traditions that predicted the occultation and rise of a future imam were already in circulation for a century before the death of the eleventh Imam in 260 (874 CE), and possibly as early as the seventh-century CE. These traditions were appropriated by various Shia sects in different periods, including the now-extinct sects of Nawusites and Waqifites. For instance, these traditions were cited by the now-extinct Kaysanites, who denied the death of Ibn al-Hanafiyya, and held that he was in hiding in the Razwa mountains near Medina. This likely originated with two groups of his supporters, namely, southern Arabian settlers and local recent converts in Iraq, who seem to have spread the notions now known as occultation and raj'a. Later on, these traditions were also employed by the Waqifites to argue that Musa al-Kazim, the seventh Imam, had not died but was in occultation.

In parallel, traditions predicting the occultation of a future imam also persisted in the writings of the mainstream Shia, who later formed the Twelvers. Based on this material, the Twelver doctrine of occultation crystallized in the first half of the fourth (tenth) century, in the works of Ibrahim al-Qummi (d. 919), Ya'qub al-Kulayni (d. 941), and Ibn Babawayh (d. 991), among others. This period also saw a transition in Twelver arguments from a traditionist to a rationalist approach in order to vindicate the occultation of the twelfth Imam.

The Twelver authors also aim to establish that the description of Mahdi in Sunni sources applies to the twelfth Imam. Their efforts gained momentum in the seventh (thirteenth) century when some notable Sunni scholars endorsed the Shia view of the Mahdi, including the Shafi'i traditionist Muhammad ibn Yusuf al-Gandji. Since then, Amir-Moezzi writes, there is Sunni support from time to time for the Twelvers' view of Mahdi. There has also been some support for the mahdiship of the twelfth Imam in Sufi circles, for instance, by the Egyptian Sufi al-Sha'rani.

Before the rise of the Fatimid Caliphate, as a major Isma'ili Sh'a dynasty, the terms Mahdi and Qa'im were used interchangeably for the messianic imam anticipated in Shia traditions. With the rise of the Fatimids in the tenth century CE, however, al-Qadi al-Nu'man argued that some of these predictions had materialized by the first Fatimid caliph, Abd Allah al-Mahdi Billah, while the rest would be fulfilled by his successors. Henceforth, their literature referred to the awaited eschatological imam only as Qa'im (instead of Mahdi). In Zaydi view, imams are not endowed with superhuman qualities, and expectations for their mahdiship are thus often marginal. One exception is the now-extinct Husaynites in Yemen, who denied the death of al-Husayn ibn al-Qasim al-Iyani and awaited his return.

Facsimiles from the manuscripts of Al-Musannaf, Al-Sunan, Manaqib al-Shafi'i, and Al-Futuhat al-Makkiyya regarding Al-Mahdi ("May Allah Be Pleased with Him")

== Hadith Methodology and Manuscript Studies ==
Researcher Şaban Er, who states that the Hadiths regarding Al-Mahdi ("May Allah Be Pleased with Him") are authentic, examines and documents the chains of transmission (isnad) of these narrations in his study prepared by utilizing around 270 original manuscripts, primarily including the Kutub al-Sittah.

Er, demonstrates with scientific evidence through the manuscripts he examined that certain Shiite sects committed textual falsifications in the manuscripts of Ibn al-Arabi's al-Futuhat al-Makkiyya and Sha'rani's al-Yawaqit wa al-Jawahir and Lawaqih in order to legitimize their own notions of Mahdism.

== In Islamic doctrine ==
=== Sunni Islam ===
In Sunni Islam, the Mahdi doctrine is not theologically important and remains as a popular belief instead. Of the six canonical Sunni hadith compilations, three—Abi Dawud, Ibn Maja, and al-Tirmidhi—contain traditions on the Mahdi; the compilations of al-Bukhari and Muslim—considered the most authoritative by the Sunnis and the earliest of the six—do not, nor does al-Nasa'i. Some Sunnis, including the philosopher and historian Ibn Khaldun (d. 1406), and reportedly also Hasan al-Basri, an influential early theologian and exegete, deny the Mahdi being a separate figure, holding that Jesus will fulfill this role and judge over mankind; Mahdi is thus considered a title for Jesus when he returns. Others, like the historian and the Qur'an commentator Ibn Kathir (d. 1373), elaborated a whole apocalyptic scenario which includes prophecies about the Mahdi, Jesus, and the Dajjal (the antichrist) during the end times.

The common opinion among the Sunnis is that the Mahdi is an expected ruler to be sent by God before the end times to re-establish righteousness. He is held to be from among the descendants of Muhammad through his daughter Fatima and her husband Ali, and his physical characteristics including a broad forehead and curved nose. He will eradicate injustice and evil from the world. He will be from the Hasanid branch of Muhammad's descendants, as opposed to the Shia belief that he is of the Husaynid line. The Mahdi's name would be Muhammad and his father's name would be Abd Allah. Abu Dawud quotes Muhammad as saying: "The Mahdi will be from my family, from the descendants of Fatimah". Another hadith states:

Even if only one day remains [until the doomsday], God will lengthen this day until He calls forth a man from me, or from the family of my house, his name matching mine and his father's name matching that of my father. He will fill the Earth with equity and justice just as it had previously been filled with injustice and oppression.

Before the arrival of the Mahdi, the earth would be filled with anarchy and chaos. Divisions and civil wars, moral degradation, and worldliness would be prevalent among the Muslims. Injustice and oppression would be rampant in the world. In the aftermath of the death of a king, the people would quarrel among themselves, and the as yet unrecognized Mahdi would flee from Medina to Mecca to take refuge in the Ka'ba. He would be the Mahdi recognized as ruler by the people. The Dajjal would appear and will spread corruption in the world. With an army bearing black banners, which would come to his aid from the east, the Mahdi would fight the Dajjal, and will be able to defeat him. Dressed in saffron robes with his head anointed, Jesus would descend at the point of a white minaret of the Umayyad Mosque in eastern Damascus (believed to be the Minaret of Jesus) and join the Mahdi. Jesus would pray behind the Mahdi and then kill the Dajjal. The Gog and Magog would also appear wreaking havoc before their final defeat by the forces of Jesus. Although not as significant as the Dajjal and the Gog and Magog, the Sufyani, another representative of the forces of dark, also features in the Sunni traditions. He will rise in Syria before the appearance of Mahdi. When the latter appears, the Sufyani, along with his army, will either be swallowed up en route to Mecca by the earth with God's command or defeated by the Mahdi. Jesus and the Mahdi will then conquer the world and establish a caliphate. The Mahdi will die after 7 to 13 years, whereas Jesus after 40 years. Their deaths would be followed by reappearance of corruption before the final end of the world.

=== Shia Islam ===
==== Twelver ====
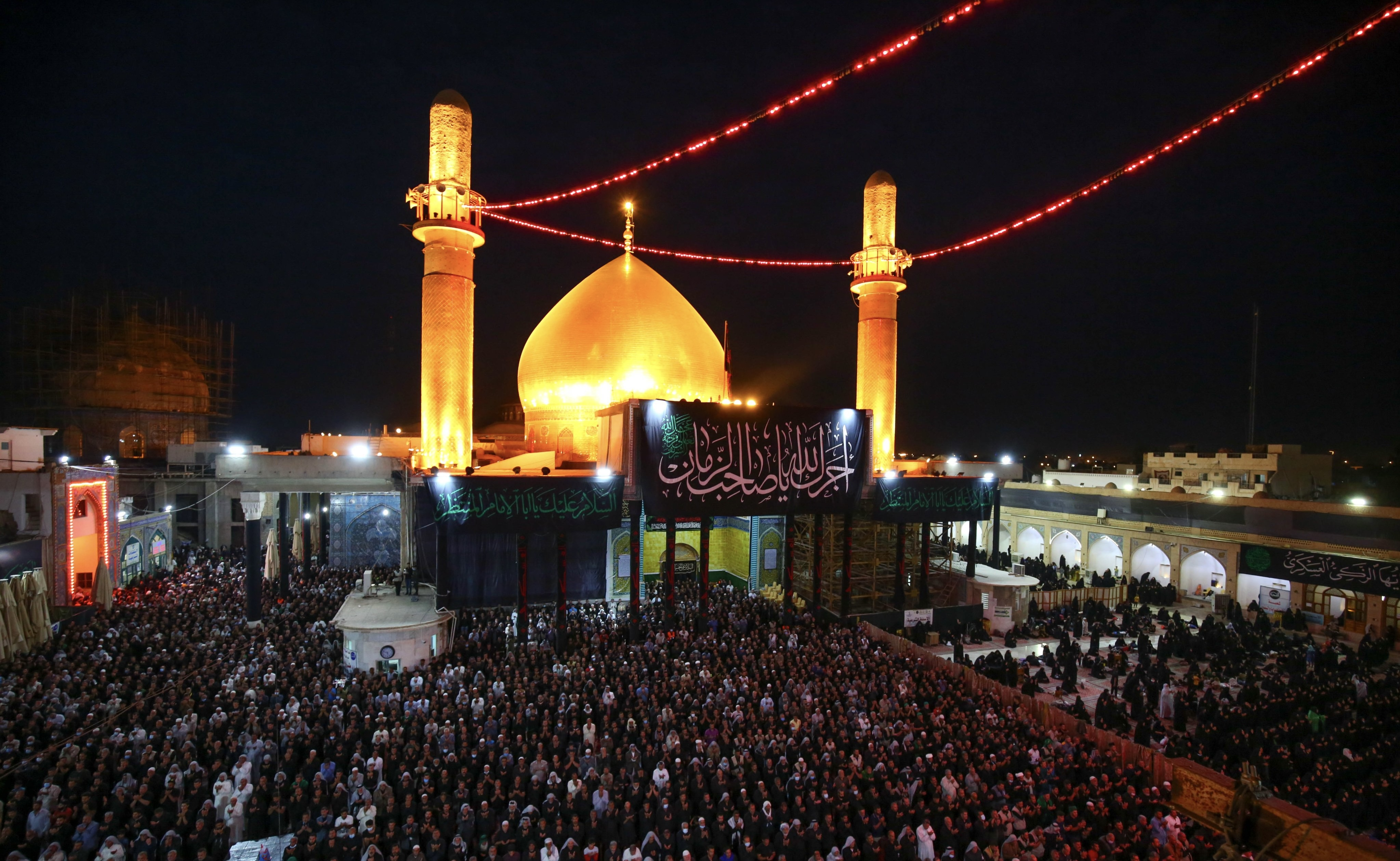
The Al-Askari Shrine in Samarra, Iraq, stands where the house of the 11th Imam Hasan al-Askari and his son the Mahdi once used to be. It contains the mausoleums of al-Askari, and the 10th Imam Ali al-Hadi

In Twelver Shi'ism, the largest branch of Shia Islam, the belief in the messianic imam is not merely a part of the creed, but the pivot. For the Twelver Shia, the Mahdi was born but disappeared, and would remain hidden from humanity until he reappears to bring justice to the world in the end of time, a doctrine known as the Occultation. This imam in occultation is the twelfth imam, Muhammad, son of the eleventh imam, Hasan al-Askari. According to the Twelvers, the Mahdi was born in Samarra around 868, though his birth was kept hidden from the public. He lived under his father's care until 874 when the latter was killed by the Abbasids.

===== Minor Occultation =====
When his father died in 874, possibly poisoned by the Abbasids, the Mahdi went into occultation by the divine command and was hidden from public view for his life was in danger from the Abbasids. Only a few of the elite among the Shia, known as the deputies (سفراء, sufara; sing. سفير safir) of the twelfth imam, were able to communicate with him; hence the occultation in this period is referred to as the Minor Occultation (ghayba al-sughra).

The first of the deputies is held to have been Uthman ibn Sa'id al-Amri, a trusted companion and confidant of the eleventh imam. Through him the Mahdi would answer the demands and questions of the Shia. He was later succeeded by his son Muhammad ibn Uthman al-Amri, who held the office for some fifty years and died in 917. His successor Husayn ibn Rawh al-Nawbakhti was in the office until his death in 938. The next deputy, Ali ibn Muhammad al-Simari, abolished the office on the orders of the imam just a few days before his death in 941.

===== Major Occultation =====
With the death of the fourth agent, thus began the Major Occultation (الغيبة الكبرى, ghayba al-kubra), in which the communication between the Mahdi and the faithful was severed. The leadership vacuum in the Twelver community was gradually filled by jurists. During the Major Occultation, the Mahdi roams the earth and is sustained by God. He is the lord of the time (صاحب الزمان sahib az-zamān) and does not age. Although his whereabouts and the exact date of his return are unknown, the Mahdi is nevertheless believed to contact some of his Shia if he wishes. The accounts of these encounters are numerous and widespread in the Twelver community. Shia scholars have argued that the longevity of the Mahdi is not unreasonable given the long lives of Khidr, Jesus, and the Dajjal, as well as secular reports about long-lived men. Along these lines, Tabatabai emphasizes the miraculous qualities of al-Mahdi, adding that his long life, while unlikely, is not impossible. He is viewed as the sole legitimate ruler of the Muslim world and the constitution of the Islamic Republic of Iran recognizes him as the head of the state.

===== Reappearance =====
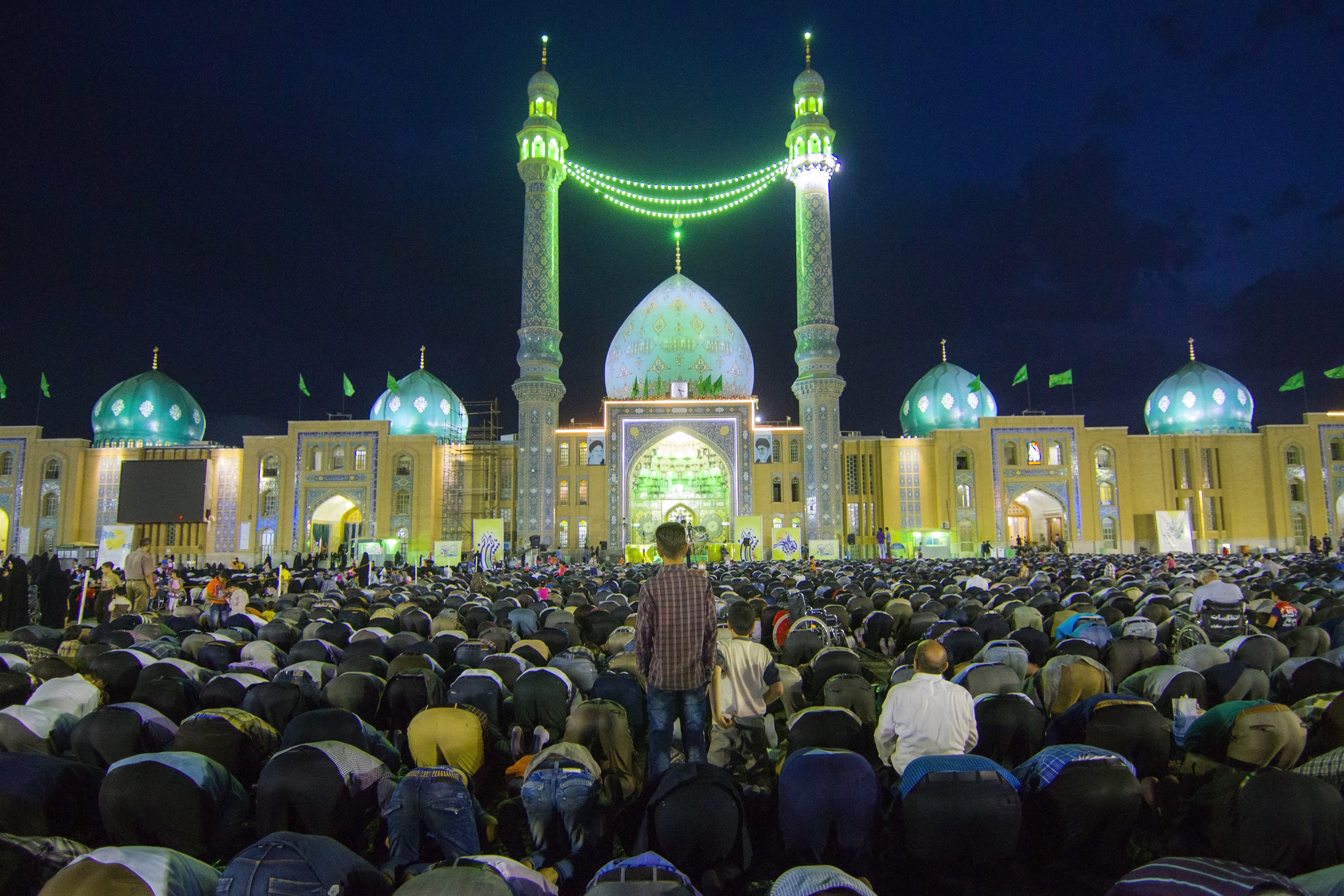
The Jamkaran Mosque in Qom, Iran, is believed to be the place where the Mahdi once appeared and offered prayers.

Before his reappearance (Arabic: ظهور, romanized: ẓuhūr), the world will plunge into chaos, where immorality and ignorance will be commonplace, the Qur'an will be forgotten, and religion will be abandoned. There will be plagues, earthquakes, floods, wars and death. The Sufyani will rise and lead people astray. The Mahdi will then reappear in Mecca, with the sword of Ali (ḏū l-fiqār) in his hand, between the corner of the Ka'ba and the station of Abraham.

By some accounts, he will reappear on the day of Ashura (the tenth of Muharram), the day the third Imam Husayn ibn Ali was slain. He will be "a young man of medium stature with a handsome face," with black hair and beard. A divine cry will call the people of the world to his aid, after which the angels, jinns, and humans will flock to the Mahdi. This is often followed shortly by another supernatural cry from the earth that invites men to join the enemies of the Mahdi, and would appeal to disbelievers and hypocrites.

The Mahdi will then go to Kufa, which will become his capital, and send troops to kill the Sufyani in Damascus. Husayn and his slain partisans are expected to resurrect to avenge their deaths, known as the doctrine of raj'a (lit. 'return'). The episode of Jesus' return in the Twelver doctrine is similar to the Sunni belief, although in some Twelver traditions it is the Mahdi who would kill the Dajjal. Those who hold enmity towards Ali (Arabic: نَواصِب, romanized: nawāṣib, lit. 'haters') will be subject to jizya (poll tax) or killed if they do not accept Shia Islam.

The Mahdi is also viewed as the restorer of true Islam, and the restorer of other monotheistic religions after their distortion and abandonment. He establishes the kingdom of God on earth and Islamizes the whole world. In their true form, it is believed, all monotheistic religions are essentially identical to Islam as "submission to God." It is in this sense, according to Mohammad Ali Amir Moezzi, that one should understand the claims that al-Mahdi will impose Islam on everyone. His rule will be paradise on earth, which will last for seventy years until his death, though other traditions state 7, 19, or 309 years.

==== Isma'ilism ====
In Isma'ilism a distinct concept of the Mahdi developed, with select Isma'ili Imams representing the Mahdi or al-Qa'im at various times. When the sixth Shia imam Ja'far al-Sadiq died, some of his followers held his already dead son Isma'il ibn Ja'far to be the imam asserting that he was alive and will return as the Mahdi. Another group accepted his death and acknowledged his son Muhammad ibn Isma'il as the imam instead. When he died, his followers too denied his death and believed that he was the last imam and the Mahdi. By the mid-9th century, Isma'ili groups of different persuasions had coalesced into a unified movement centered in Salamiyya in central Syria, and a network of activists was working to collect funds and amass weapons for the return of the Mahdi Muhammad ibn Isma'il, who would overthrow the Abbasids and establish his righteous caliphate. (Note: The leaders of the movement at this stage laid no claim to the imamate as the Mahdi was thought to be the last imam.) The propaganda of the Mahdi's return had a special appeal to peasants, Bedouins, and many of the later-to-be Twelver Shias, who were in a state of confusion (hayra) in the aftermath of the death of their 11th imam Hasan al-Askari, and resulted in many conversions.

In 899, the leader of the movement, Sa'id ibn al-Husayn, declared himself the Mahdi. This brought about schism in the unified Isma'ili community as not all adherents of the movement accepted his Mahdist claims. Those in Iraq and Arabia, known as Qarmatians after their leader Hamdan Qarmat, still held that Muhammad ibn Isma'il was the awaited Mahdi and denounced the Salamiyya-based Mahdism. In the Qarmati doctrine, the Mahdi was to abrogate the Islamic law (the Sharia) and bring forth a new message. In 931, the then Qarmati leader Abu Tahir al-Jannabi declared a Persian prisoner named Abu'l-Fadl al-Isfahani as the awaited Mahdi. The Mahdi went on to denounce Moses, Jesus, and Muhammad as liars, abolished Islam, and instituted the cult of fire. Abu Tahir had to depose him as imposter and had him executed.

Meanwhile, in Syria, Sa'id ibn al-Husayn's partisans took control of the central Syria in 903, and for a time the Friday sermon was read in the name of the "Successor, the rightly-guided Heir, the Lord of the Age, the Commander of the Faithful, the Mahdi". Eventually, the uprising was routed by the Abbasids. This forced Sa'id to flee from Syria to North Africa, where he founded the Fatimid Caliphate in Ifriqiya in 909. There he assumed the regnal name al-Mahdi Billah; as the historian Heinz Halm comments, the singular, semi-divine figure of the Mahdi was thus reduced to an adjective in a caliphal title, 'the Imam rightly guided by God' (al-imam al-mahdi bi'llah): instead of the promised messiah, al-Mahdi presented himself merely as one in a long sequence of imams descending from Ali and Fatima.

Messianic expectations associated with the Mahdi nevertheless did not materialize, contrary to the expectations of his propagandists and followers who expected him to do wonders. Al-Mahdi attempted to downplay messianism and asserted that the propaganda of Muhammad ibn Isma'il's return as the Mahdi had only been a ruse to avoid Abbasid persecution and protect the real imam predecessors of his. The Mahdi was actually a collective title of the true imams from the progeny of Ja'far al-Sadiq. In a bid to gain time, al-Mahdi also sought to shift the messianic expectations on his son, al-Qa'im: by renaming himself as Abdallah Abu Muhammad, and his son as Abu'l-Qasim Muhammad rather than his original name, Abd al-Rahman, the latter would bear the name Abu'l-Qasim Muhammad ibn Abdallah. This was the name of the Islamic prophet Muhammad, and it had been prophesied that the Mahdi would also bear it. The Fatimids eventually dropped the millenarian rhetoric.

The Tayyibi Musta'li Isma'ili Shia believe that their Occulted Imam and Mahdi is Abu'l-Qasim al-Tayyib, son of the Fatimid Caliph Al-Amir bi-Ahkam Allah.

==== Zaydism ====
In Zaydism, the concept of the imamate differs significantly from that held by the Isma'ili and Twelver branches; a Zaydi Imam may be any respectable person from the descendants of Ali and Fatima who lays claim to political leadership and struggles for its acquisition. As such, the Zaydi imamate doctrine lacks eschatological characteristics and there is no end-times redeemer in Zaydism. The title of mahdi, however, has been applied to several Zaydi imams as an honorific over the centuries. (Note: The extinct Zaydi sect of Husayniyya from western Yemen believed in the return of al-Husayn al-Mahdi li-din Allah (d. 1013) as the Mahdi.)

=== Ahmadiyya belief ===
In the Ahmadiyya belief, the prophesied eschatological figures of Christianity and Islam, the Messiah and Mahdi, actually refer to the same person. These prophecies were fulfilled in Mirza Ghulam Ahmad (1835–1908), the founder of the movement; he is held to be the Mahdi and the manifestation of Jesus. However, the historical Jesus in their view, although escaped crucifixion, nevertheless died and will not be coming back. Instead, God made Mirza Ghulam Ahmad the exact alike of Jesus in character and qualities. Similarly, the Mahdi is not an apocalyptic figure to launch global jihad and conquer the world, but a peaceful mujaddid (renewer of religion), who spreads Islam with "heavenly signs and arguments".

== Mahdi claimants ==
Throughout history, various individuals have claimed to be or were proclaimed to be the Mahdi. Claimants have included Muhammad Jaunpuri, the founder of the Mahdavia sect; Ali Muhammad Shirazi, the founder of Bábism; Muhammad Ahmad, who established the Mahdist State in Sudan in the late 19th century; Mirza Ghulam Ahmad, who proclaimed that he was the promised Messiah and the Mahdi in India in the late 19th century and founded the Ahmadiyya movement. The Iranian dissident Massoud Rajavi, the leader of the MEK, also claimed to be a 'representative' of the Mahdi. The adherents of the NOI Nation of Islam borrow heavily from Ahmadiyya doctrines on Mirza Ghulam Ahmad and hold NOI founder Wallace Fard Muhammad, to be the Messiah and the Mahdi. In subsequent years, Nation of Islam leaders have claimed to be the Mahdi, including Warith Deen Mohammed and Louis Farrakhan. Likewise, Adnan Oktar, a Turkish cult leader, and Muhammad Qasim ibn Abd al-Karim, a Pakistani preacher, are considered by their followers as the Mahdi. Ibn Khaldun noted a pattern where embracing a Mahdi claimant enabled unity among tribes and/or a region, often enabled them to forcibly seize power, but the lifespan of such a force was usually limited, as their Mahdi had to conform to hadith prophesies—winning their battles and bringing peace and justice to the world before Judgement Day—which (so far) none have.

== See also ==
- Maitreya
- List of Mahdi claimants
- Signs of the appearance of Mahdi
- Moshiach
- Du'a al-Faraj

== Sources ==
- Arjomand, Saïd Amir (2000). "Origins and Development of Apocalypticism and Messianism in Early Islam: 610–750 CE". Oslo: Congress of the International Committee of the Historical Sciences.
- Arjomand, Saïd Amir (2007). "The Concept of Mahdi in Sunni Islam". Encyclopaedia Iranica. Vol. 14, Fasc. 2. Encyclopædia Iranica Foundation.
- Bashir, Shahzad (2003). Messianic Hopes and Mystical Visions: The Nūrbakhshīya Between Medieval and Modern Islam. Columbia: University of South Carolina Press. ISBN 1-57003-495-8.
- Bentlage, Björn; Eggert, Marion; Krämer, Hans-Martin; Reichmuth, Stefan (2016). Religious Dynamics under the Impact of Imperialism and Colonialism: A Sourcebook. Brill. ISBN 978-90-04-32900-3.
- Blichfeldt, Jan-Olaf (1985). Early Mahdism: Politics and Religion in the Formative Period of Islam. Leiden: E.J. Brill. ISBN 978-90-04-07643-3.
- Cook, David (2002a). Studies in Muslim Apocalyptic. Princeton: The Darwin Press. ISBN 978-0-87850-142-7.
- Cook, David (2002b). "Ḥadīth, Authority and the End of the World: Traditions in Modern Muslim Apocalyptic Literature". Oriente Moderno. 82 (1): 31–53. doi:10.1163/22138617-08201004. hdl:1911/70538. JSTOR 25817811.
- Cook, Michael (2016). "Eschatology and the Dating of Traditions". In Motzki, Harald (ed.). Ḥadīth: Origins and Developments. London and New York: Routledge. ISBN 978-1-138-24779-6.
- Daftary, Farhad (2007). The Ismāʿı̄lı̄s: Their History and Doctrines (Second ed.). Cambridge: Cambridge University Press. ISBN 978-0-521-61636-2.
- Daftary, Farhad (2013). A History of Shi'i Islam. London: I.B. Tauris. ISBN 978-1-78076-841-0.
- Doi, A. R. I. (1971). "The Yoruba Mahdī". Journal of Religion in Africa. 4 (2): 119–136. doi:10.1163/157006671x00070. JSTOR 1594738.
- Esposito, John L. (1998). Islam and Politics (4th ed.). Syracuse: Syracuse University Press. ISBN 0-8156-2774-2.
- Filiu, Jean-Pierre (2009). "The Return of Political Mahdism". Current Trends in Islamist Ideology. 8: 26–38. ISSN 1940-834X. Archived from the original on 20 May 2022.
- Filiu, Jean-Pierre (2011). Apocalypse in Islam. Translated by DeBevoise, M. B. Berkely: University of California Press. ISBN 978-0-520-26431-1.
- Fishman, Jason Eric; Soage, Ana Belén (2013). "The Nation of Islam and the Muslim World: Theologically Divorced and Politically United". Religion Compass. 7 (2): 59–68. doi:10.1111/rec3.12032.
- Friedmann, Yohanan (1989). Prophecy Continuous: Aspects of Ahmadi Religious Thought and its Medieval Background. Berkeley and Los Angeles: University of California Press. ISBN 0-520-05772-4.
- Furnish, Timothy R. (2005). Holiest Wars: Islamic Mahdis, Jihad and Osama Bin Laden. Westport, CT: Praeger. ISBN 0-275-98383-8.
- Goldziher, Ignaz (2021). Introduction to Islamic Theology and Law. Princeton University Press. ISBN 978-1-4008-4351-0.
- Halm, Heinz (1991). Das Reich des Mahdi: Der Aufstieg der Fatimiden [The Empire of the Mahdi: The Rise of the Fatimids] (in German). Munich: C. H. Beck. ISBN 978-3-406-35497-7.
- Halm, Heinz (1997). Shi'a Islam: From Religion to Revolution. Translated by Brown, Allison. Princeton: Markus Wiener Publishers. ISBN 1-55876-134-9.
- Halm, Heinz (2004). Shi'ism. Translated by Watson, Janet; Hill, Marian (2nd ed.). Edinburgh: Edinburgh University Press. ISBN 0-7486-1888-0.
- Halm, Heinz (2014). Kalifen und Assassinen: Ägypten und der vordere Orient zur Zeit der ersten Kreuzzüge, 1074–1171 [Caliphs and Assassins: Egypt and the Near East at the Time of the First Crusades, 1074–1171] (in German). Munich: C.H. Beck. ISBN 978-3-406-66163-1.
- Halverson, Jeffry R.; Goodall, H. L. Jr.; Corman, Steven R. (2011). Master Narratives of Islamist Extremism. New York: Palgrave Macmillan. ISBN 978-0-230-10896-7.
- Klemm, Verena (1984). "Die vier sufarā' des Zwölften Imām: Zur formativen Periode der Zwölferšīʽa". Die Welt des Orients. 15: 126–143. JSTOR 25683146.
- Klemm, Verena (2007). "Islam in Iran ix. The Deputies of Mahdi". Encyclopaedia Iranica. Vol. XIV/2. pp. 143–146.
- Leirvik, Oddbjørn (2010). Images of Jesus Christ in Islam (2nd ed.). London: Continuum International Publishing Group. ISBN 978-1-4411-7739-1.
- Madelung, Wilferd (1981). "ʿAbd Allāh b. al-Zubayr and the Mahdi". Journal of Near Eastern Studies. 40 (4): 291–305. doi:10.1086/372899. S2CID 161061748.
- Madelung, Wilferd (1986). "Al–Mahdi". In Bosworth, C. E.; van Donzel, E.; Lewis, B. & Pellat, Ch. (eds.). The Encyclopaedia of Islam, Second Edition. Volume V: Khe–Mahi. Leiden: E. J. Brill. pp. 1230–1238. ISBN 978-90-04-07819-2.
- Madelung, W. (2022). "Al-Mahdī". In Bearman, P. (ed.). Encyclopaedia of Islam (Second ed.). Brill Reference Online.
- Momen, Moojan (1985). An Introduction to Shi'i Islam: the history and doctrines of Twelver Shiʻism. Yale University Press. ISBN 978-0-300-03499-8.
- Sachedina, Abdulaziz A. (1978). "A Treatise on the Occultation of the Twelfth Imāmite Imam". Studia Islamica (48): 109–124. doi:10.2307/1595355. JSTOR 1595355.
- Sachedina, Abdulaziz A. (1981). Islamic Messianism: The Idea of Mahdi in Twelver Shi'ism. Albany: State University of New York Press. ISBN 978-0-87395-442-6.
- Sonn, Tamarra (2004). A Brief History of Islam. Blackwell Publishing. ISBN 978-1-4051-2174-3.
- Valentine, Simon Ross (2008). Islam and the Ahmadiyya Jama'at: History, Belief, Practice. New York: Columbia University Press. ISBN 978-0-231-70094-8.
- Amir-Moezzi, Mohammad Ali (2007). "Islam in Iran vii. The Concept of Mahdi in Twelver Shiʿism". Encyclopaedia Iranica. Vol. XIV/2. pp. 136–143.
- Amir-Moezzi, Mohammad Ali (1998). "Eschatology iii. Imami Shiʿism". Encyclopaedia Iranica. Vol. VIII/6. pp. 575–581.
- Hussain, Jassim M. (1986). Occultation of the Twelfth Imam: A Historical Background. Routledge Kegan & Paul. ISBN 978-0-7103-0158-1.
- Tabatabai, Sayyid Mohammad Hosayn (1975). Shi'ite Islam. Translated by Sayyid Hossein Nasr. State University of New York Press. ISBN 0-87395-390-8.
- Kohlberg, Etan (24 December 2009). "From Imamiyya to Ithna-ashariyya". Bulletin of the School of Oriental and African Studies. 39 (3): 521–534. doi:10.1017/S0041977X00050989. S2CID 155070530.
- Kohlberg, E. (2022). "Rad̲j̲ʿa". In Bearman, P. (ed.). Encyclopaedia of Islam (2nd ed.). Brill Reference Online.
- Hussain, Jassim M. (1989). "Messianism and the Mahdi". In Nasr, Seyyed Hossein; Dabashi, Hamid; Nasr, Seyyed Vali Reza (eds.). Expectation of the Millennium: Shi'ism in History. State University of New York Press. ISBN 978-0-88706-844-7.
- Sobhani, Ja'far (2001). Doctrines of Shi'i Islam (PDF). Translated by Shah-Kazemi, Reza. I.B. Tauris.
- Modarressi, Hossein (1993). Crisis and Consolidation in the Formative Period of Shi'ite Islam: Abū Ja'far Ibn Qiba Al-Rāzī and His Contribution to Imāmite Shī'ite Thought (PDF). Darwin Press. ISBN 978-0-87850-095-6. Archived from the original (PDF) on 16 June 2022.
- Nanji, Azim; Daftary, Farhad (2006). "What is Shiite Islam?". In Cornell, Vincent J. (ed.). Voices of Islam. Vol. 1. Greenwood Publishing Group. ISBN 978-0-275-98732-9.
