= Abu al-Qasim al-Husayn ibn Ruh al-Nawbakhti =

Third deputy of Imam Muhammad al-Mahdi

Abū al-Qāsim al-Ḥusayn ibn Rūḥ al-Nawbakhtī
- أبو القاسم الحسين بن روح النوبختي

Deputy of Imam Muhammad al-Mahdi
- In office 917–937
- Preceded by: Abu Ja'far Muhammad ibn Uthman
- Succeeded by: Abu al-Hasan Ali ibn Muhammad al-Samarri

Personal life
- Born: Saveh, Iran
- Died: 937 CE Baghdad, Iraq
- Known for: Third of the Four Deputies

Religious life
- Religion: Islam
- Denomination: Shia
- Jurisprudence: Ja'fari
- Creed: Twelver

Muslim leader
- Disciple of: Muhammad al-Mahdi
- Influenced: Abu al-Hasan Ali ibn Muhammad al-Samarri, Twelver Shi'ites

Abū al-Qāsim al-Ḥusayn ibn Rūḥ al-Nawbakhtī (Arabic: أبو القاسم الحسين بن روح النوبختي) was the third of the Four Deputies, who are believed by the Twelvers to have successively represented their Hidden Imam, Muhammad al-Mahdi, during his Minor Occultation (874–941 CE). Ibn Rūḥ in this role succeeded Abu Ja'far Muhammad ibn Uthman in 917 CE. After some twenty years in office, Ibn Rūḥ died in 937 CE and was succeeded by Abul Hasan Ali ibn Muhammad al-Samarri, the fourth and final deputy.

== Historical background ==
Until their deaths, the tenth and eleventh Shia Imams (Ali al-Hadi and Hasan al-Askari, respectively) were held in the garrison town of Samarra under close surveillance (or house arrest) by the Abbasids, who are often responsible in Shia sources for poisoning the two Imams. The two Imams witnessed the deterioration of the Abbasid caliphate, as the imperial authority rapidly transitioned into the hands of the Turks, particularly after al-Mutawakkil.

Contemporary to the tenth Imam, the Abbasid al-Mutawakkil violently prosecuted the Shia, partly due to a renewed Zaydi opposition. The restrictive policies of al-Mutawakkil towards the tenth Imam were later adopted by his son, al-Mu'tamid, who is reported to have kept the eleventh Imam under house arrest without any visitors. Instead, al-Askari is known to have primarily communicated with his followers through a network of representatives. Among them was Uthman ibn Sa'id (d. 880), who is said to have disguised himself as a seller of cooking fat to avoid the Abbasid agents, hence his nickname al-Samman. Tabatabai suggests that these restrictions were placed on al-Askari because the caliphate had come to know about traditions among the Shia elite, predicting that the eleventh Imam would father the eschatological Mahdi.

Immediately after the death of al-Askari in 260 (874), Uthman ibn Sa'id claimed that the eleventh Imam had a young son, named Muhammad, who had entered a state of occultation (ghayba) due to the Abbasid threat to his life. As the special agent of al-Askari, Uthman also claimed that he had been appointed to represent the son of the eleventh Imam. Twelver sources detail that Muhammad al-Mahdi made his only public appearance to lead the funeral prayer for his father instead of his uncle, Ja'far.

Thus began a period of about seventy years, later termed the Minor Occultation (al-ghaybat al-sughra, 260-329 AH, 874–940 CE), during which it is believed that four successive agents acted as intermediaries between the Hidden Imam and his followers. These four agents are collectively known as the Four Deputies (al-nuwwab al-arba'). An agent (wakil) was also variously called deputy (na'ib), emissary (safir), and gate (bab).

Uthman was later succeeded by his son, Abu Ja'far Muhammad, who served until his death in 304 or 305 (917 or 918 CE).

== Life ==
The birth date of Ibn Ruh is unknown. It is known that he was a native of Qom, located in present-day Iran, who later migrated to Baghdad during the time of the first agent, Uthman ibn Sa'id. Ibn Ruh was also a member of the al-Nawbakhti, an influential family in the Abbasid court. In view of his close ties with Abu Sahl al-Nawbakhti, the leader of the al-Nawbakhti family, Ibn Ruh is said to have been highly respected in the Abbasid court. He was also a close associate of the second agent, Abu Ja'far. It appears that Ibn Ruh was admired among the Twelvers for his scrupulous adherence to religious dissimulation (taqiya).

== Appointment ==
The second agent, Abu Ja'far, is said to have designated Ibn Ruh as his successor in the presence of some notable Twelvers in 917 CE. There, Abu Ja'far also added that this appointment was commanded by the Hidden Imam. Tusi in his Kitab al-Ghayba writes that the appointment of Ibn Ruh was immediately confirmed with a note from the Hidden Imam, which, according to Sachedina, may suggest that some were dissatisfied with his appointment. With this note, the communications with the Hidden Imam resumed after a lapse of about twenty-five years.

== Tenure as an agent of al-Mahdi ==
Ibn Ruh's term overlapped with the caliphates of al-Muqtader (r. 908–932), al-Qahir (r. 932–934), al-Radi (r. 934–940). He was often in favor with their viziers. However, following the 306 (918) downfall of the Banu al-Furat, the influential Twelver family in the Abbasid court, Ibn Ruh was temporarily forced into hiding and later imprisoned in 312 (924–25) by al-Muqtadir for financial reasons. It was likely around this time that an associate of Ibn Ruh, named Abu Ja'far Muhammad ibn Ali al-Shalmaghani, turned against him and claimed to be the rightful agent of the Hidden Imam, before denouncing the concept of occultation as a lie. He was soon denounced by the Twelvers and Ibn Ruh's authority was further strengthened after receiving another note attributed to the Hidden Imam. Another controversial figure was a disciple of al-Askari, named al-Karkhi, who was later condemned in a rescript, said to be written by al-Mahdi. Ibn Ruh died in 326 (937), and was buried in Baghdad in what is today's al-Rusafa's al-Nawbakhti Shrine. He was succeeded by Abu al-Hasan Ali ibn Muhammad al-Samarri as the fourth and last agent.

== See also ==
- Uthman ibn Sa'id al-Asadi
- Abu Ja'far Muhammad ibn Uthman
- Abu al-Hasan Ali ibn Muhammad al-Samarri

== Sources ==
- Amir-Moezzi, Mohammad Ali (1998). "ESCHATOLOGY iii. Imami Shiʿism". Encyclopaedia Iranica. Vol. VIII/6. pp. 575–581.
- Amir-Moezzi, Mohammad Ali (2007). "ISLAM IN IRAN vii. THE CONCEPT OF MAHDI IN TWELVER SHIʿISM". Encyclopaedia Iranica. Vol. XIV/2. pp. 136–143.
- Amir-Moezzi, Mohammad Ali (2016). Divine Guide in Early Shi'ism: The Sources of Esotericism in Islam. SUNY Press. ISBN 9780791494790.
- Daftary, Farhad (2013). A History of Shi'i Islam. I.B. Tauris. ISBN 9780755608669.
- Donaldson, Dwight M. (1933). The Shi'ite Religion: A History of Islam in Persia and Iraḳ. AMS Press.
- Eliash, J. (2022). "Ḥasan Al-ʿAskarī". In Bearman, P. (ed.). Encyclopaedia of Islam (Second ed.). Brill Reference Online.
- Holt, P.M.; Lambton, Ann K.S.; Lewis, Bernard, eds. (1970). The Cambridge history of Islam. Vol. 1. Cambridge University Press.
- Hulmes, Edward D.A. (2013). "HASAN AL-'ASKARI, ABU MUHAMMAD HASAN IBN 'ALI (c. AD 845-74)". In Netton, Ian Richard (ed.). Encyclopedia of Islamic Civilization and Religion. Routledge. p. 217. ISBN 9781135179670.
- Hussain, Jassim M. (1986). Occultation of the Twelfth Imam: A Historical Background. Routledge Kegan & Paul. ISBN 9780710301581.
- Al-Jalali, Muhammad Husayn (1995). Shrines of the Ahl al-Bayt and their history (in Arabic). University of Michigan: Al-A'alami Foundation for Publications. OCLC 187468586.
- Klemm, Verena (2007). ISLAM IN IRAN ix. THE DEPUTIES OF MAHDI. Vol. XIV/2. pp. 143–6.
- Momen, Moojan (1985). An Introduction to Shi'i Islam. Yale University Press. ISBN 9780300034998.
- Modarressi, Hossein (1993). Crisis and Consolidation in the Formative Period of Shi'ite Islam: Abū Ja'far Ibn Qiba Al-Rāzī and His Contribution to Imāmite Shī'ite Thought (PDF). Darwin Press. ISBN 9780878500956. Archived from the original (PDF) on 2022-06-16.
- Sachedina, Abdulaziz Abdulhussein (1981). Islamic Messianism: The Idea of Mahdī in Twelver Shīʻism. Suny press. ISBN 978-0873954426.
- Tabatabai, Sayyid Mohammad Hosayn (1975). Shi'ite Islam. Translated by Sayyid Hossein Nasr. State University of New York Press. ISBN 0-87395-390-8.
