= Minor Occultation =

874–941 CE Era in the Twelver Shia theology

The Minor Occultation (Arabic: الغيبة الصغرى, al-Ghayba al-Ṣughrā), also known as the First Occultation (Arabic: الغيبة الأولى, al-Ghayba al-Ūlā), refers in Twelver Shia Islam to a period of nearly seventy years (874–941 CE) during which the Hidden Imam, Muhammad al-Mahdi, is believed to have communicated regularly with his followers through the Four Deputies. This period was followed by the Major Occultation (941–present), where there is no agent of the Mahdi, whose reappearance is expected to fill the earth with justice and peace in the end times.

== Historical background ==
Until their deaths, the tenth and eleventh Shia Imams (Ali al-Hadi and Hasan al-Askari, respectively) were held under close surveillance in the garrison town of Samarra by the Abbasids, who are often responsible in Shia sources for poisoning the two Imams. The two Imams witnessed the deterioration of the Abbasid caliphate, as the imperial authority rapidly transitioned into the hands of the Turks, particularly after al-Mutawakkil.

Contemporary to the tenth Imam, the Abbasid al-Mutawakkil violently prosecuted the Shia, partly due to the renewed Zaydi opposition. The restrictive policies of al-Mutawakkil towards the tenth Imam were later adopted by his son, al-Mu'tamid, who is reported to have kept the eleventh Imam under house arrest without any visitors. Instead, al-Askari is known to have mainly communicated with his followers through a network of representatives. Among them was Uthman ibn Sa'id, who is said to have disguised himself as a seller of cooking fat to avoid the Abbasid agents, hence his nickname al-Samman.

Tabatabai suggests that these restrictions were placed on al-Askari because the caliphate had come to know about traditions among the Shia elite, predicting that the eleventh Imam would father the eschatological Mahdi.

=== Underground network ===
The underground network of representatives might date back to Ja'far al-Sadiq, the sixth Imam, in response to the Abbasid restrictions on him. At the time, the main purpose of this network was to collect the Islamic alms, such as khums and zakat. The Abbasid al-Rashid is said to have carried out a campaign of arrests in 179 (795) to decimate this underground network which ultimately led to the arrest of Musa al-Kazim, the seventh Imam, and his death in prison.

By the time of Muhammad al-Jawad, the ninth Imam, some of the representatives took administrative and military roles in the caliphate by practicing religious dissimulation (taqiya). The underground network of Ali al-Hadi, the tenth Imam, was highly developed, especially in Samarra, Baghdad, Mada'in, and Sawad. However, a campaign of arrests and the subsequent tortures by the Abbasid al-Mutawakkil (r. 847–861) might have led the caliph to discover that the Imam was behind their activities. Al-Mutawakkil then summoned the Imam to Samarra, where he was kept under close surveillance and possibly house arrest. According to Hussain, restrictions on the later Imams inevitably expanded the role and authority of their representatives, particularly their main agent (safir). By performing certain functions of the Imams, these representatives might have hoped to save the Imams from the political pressure of the Abbasids.

== Deputies ==
Immediately after the death of al-Askari in 260 (873–874), Uthman al-Amri (d. 880) claimed that al-Askari had a young son, named Muhammad, who had entered a state of occultation (ghayba) due to the Abbasid threat to his life. As the special representative of al-Askari, Uthman also claimed that he had been appointed to represent the son of the eleventh Imam. A Shia tradition attributed to the sixth Imam, Ja'far al-Sadiq, states that this threat was specific to Muhammad al-Mahdi, who was expected to rise, unlike his predecessors who practiced religious dissimulation (taqiya) and were politically quiescent.

Twelver sources detail that al-Mahdi made his only public appearance to lead the funeral prayer for his father instead of his uncle, Ja'far. It is also said that the occultation took place in the family home in Samarra, where currently a mosque stands, under which there is a cellar (sardab) that hides a well (Bi'r al-Ghayba, lit. 'well of the occultation'). Into this well, al-Mahdi is said to have disappeared.

In his new capacity as the caretaker of the office of imamate, Uthman received petitions and made available their responses, sometimes in writing. As the closest associate of al-Askari, most of al-Askari's local representatives continued to support Uthman. However, there might have been doubts among the Shia about his authority to collect and manage the religious funds.

Uthman later introduced his son, Abu Ja'far Muhammad ibn Uthman (d. 916-17), as the next representative of al-Mahdi. Abu Ja'far, who served for some forty years, has been credited with the unification of the mainstream Shia behind the son of al-Askari as the twelfth Imam in concealment. In turn, as his replacement, Abu Ja'far nominated Abu al-Qasim al-Husayn ibn Ruh al-Nawbakhti (d. 937-38), who is said to have been a well-respected figure in the Abbasid court. Under Abu al-Qasim, it is reported that the communications with the Hidden Imam resumed after a lapse of about twenty-five years.

This period, later termed the Minor Occultation (al-ghaybat al-sughra), ended after about seventy years with the death of the fourth agent, Abu al-Hasan Ali ibn Muhammad al-Samarri (d. 940-41), who is said to have received a letter from al-Mahdi shortly before his death. The letter predicted the death of Abu al-Hasan in six days and announced the beginning of the complete (tamma) occultation, later called the Major Occultation (al-ghaybat al-kubra). The letter, ascribed to al-Mahdi, added that the complete occultation would continue until God granted him permission to manifest himself again in a time when the earth would be filled with tyranny. The letter emphasized that anyone claiming to be the deputy of the Imam henceforth had to be considered an imposter. This and similar letters to the four agents and other Shia figures are reported to have had the same handwriting, suggesting that they were written by the Hidden Imam.

== Shia authority in this period ==
The number of these agents was not limited to four in early Shia sources. Sachedina suggests that the later stress of the Twelver literature on the four deputies (al-nuwwab al-arba') was likely due to their prominence in Baghdad, the Shia center of the time. Similarly, Momen reckons that al-Askari's network of the representatives (wukala) likely continued to operate during the Minor Occultation of al-Mahdi. Indeed, Ibn Babawayh (d. 991) speaks of other trusted men of the Hidden Imam in different cities in addition to the four agents. Sachedina writes that the Shia community lacked a notable figure to replace the fourth agent after his death.

The authority of the four agents on behalf of the Hidden Imam was challenged by some Shia figures, more so during the term of the third agent, al-Nawbakhti. For instance, Abu Ja'far Muhammad ibn Ali al-Shalmaghani turned against al-Nawbakhti and claimed to be the rightful agent of al-Mahdi, before denouncing the concept of occultation as a lie. Another instance was a disciple of al-Askari, named al-Karkhi, who was later condemned in a rescript, said to be written by al-Mahdi. Some miracles are also ascribed to the four agents, perceived by the faithful to be the result of their initiation by the Hidden Imam.

== Shia community in this period ==
At the time, the occultation of al-Mahdi was likely not a radical change for his followers. Indeed, the tenth and eleventh Imams were already effectively in occultation for the majority of the Shia, as both Imams were held nearly isolated in Samarra by the Abbasid caliphs. It also appears that the idea of occultation was a well-established concept for the Shia, and the related traditions were already in circulation among them. These traditions forecasted the occultation and rise of a future Imam, referred to as al-Qa'im (lit. 'he who will rise') and less frequently as al-Mahdi. These traditions were appropriated by various Shia sects in different periods. For instance, they were used by the Waqifites to argue that Musa al-Kazim, the seventh Imam, had not died but was in occultation. Even earlier, the now-extinct Kaysanites denied the death of Muḥammad ibn al-Hanafiyya and awaited his return.

The political situation of the Shia in Iraq improved after the rise of the Buyid dynasty in the fourth (tenth) century. Perhaps it was the relative safety of the Shia that prompted the second agent to issue a rescript to the effect that al-Mahdi remained in occultation to avoid the burden of commitment (bay'a) to unjust rulers of the time who were the usurpers of the Imam's right in the Shia view. Ibn Babawayh (d. 991) suggested that the situation remains unknown until the reappearance of al-Mahdi but also added that the large population of the Shia did not necessarily guarantee his safety.

Nevertheless, many did not expect the occultation to continue beyond six years or beyond the fortieth birthday of al-Mahdi, and this might have contributed to an atmosphere of doubt and uncertainty among the Shia. According to Modarressi, these doubts gradually disappeared from the Shia community, possibly due to the efforts of the Shia traditionists during the period of transition to the Major Occultation. These traditionists heavily relied on prophetic traditions and specific interpretations of the Quran to vindicate the imamate of al-Mahdi. In this period, possibly after 295 (908), Shia traditionists also settled the number of Imams with the help of a Sunni hadith, in circulation long before the occultation, which stated that the prophet would be followed by twelve successors. The Hidden Imam was thus also the last Imam.

== See also ==
- The Twelve Imams
- The Fourteen Infallibles
- Eschatology
  - Islamic eschatology
- Du'a Nudba
- Occultation (Islam), on the broader concept of occultation in Shia Islam
  - Major Occultation, the second period of occultation, lasting from 941 until present
- Kitab al-Ghayba (al-Nu'mani), a work on the topic by the 10th-century Twelver Shia scholar Muhammad ibn Ibrahim al-Nu'mani
- Kitab al-Ghayba (al-Tusi), a work on the topic by the 11th-century Twelver Shia scholar al-Shaykh al-Tusi
- Rajʿa ('return'), the concomitant concept of return after occultation
  - Reappearance of Muhammad al-Mahdi, the concept of return in Twelver Shi'ism
  - Signs of the appearance of the Mahdi (in broader Islam)
- Network of agents (Wikalah)

== Sources ==
- Madelung, W. (2022). "Al-Mahdī". In Bearman, P. (ed.). Encyclopaedia of Islam (Second ed.). Brill Reference Online.
- Eliash, J. (2022). "Ḥasan Al-ʿAskarī". In Bearman, P. (ed.). Encyclopaedia of Islam (Second ed.). Brill Reference Online.
- Halm, H. (1987). "ʿASKARĪ". Encyclopaedia Iranica. Vol. II/7. p. 769.
- Glassé, Cyril, ed. (2008). "Hidden Imām". The New Encyclopedia of Islam. Alta Mira. pp. 178, 179. ISBN 9781905299683.
- Klemm, Verena (2007). ISLAM IN IRAN ix. THE DEPUTIES OF MAHDI. Vol. XIV/2. pp. 143–6.
- Sachedina, Abdulaziz Abdulhussein (1981). Islamic Messianism: The Idea of Mahdī in Twelver Shīʻism. Suny press. ISBN 978-0873954426.
- Daftary, Farhad (2013). A History of Shi'i Islam. I.B. Tauris. ISBN 9780755608669.
- Hussain, Jassim M. (1986). Occultation of the Twelfth Imam: A Historical Background. Routledge Kegan & Paul. ISBN 9780710301581.
- Momen, Moojan (1985). An Introduction to Shi'i Islam. Yale University Press. ISBN 9780300034998.
- Tabatabai, Sayyid Mohammad Hosayn (1975). Shi'ite Islam. Translated by Sayyid Hossein Nasr. State University of New York Press. ISBN 0-87395-390-8.
- Donaldson, Dwight M. (1933). The Shi'ite Religion: A History of Islam in Persia and Iraḳ. AMS Press.
- Modarressi, Hossein (1993). Crisis and Consolidation in the Formative Period of Shi'ite Islam: Abū Ja'far Ibn Qiba Al-Rāzī and His Contribution to Imāmite Shī'ite Thought (PDF). Darwin Press. ISBN 9780878500956.
- Holt, P.M.; Lambton, Ann K.S.; Lewis, Bernard, eds. (1970). The Cambridge history of Islam. Vol. 1. Cambridge University Press.
- Amir-Moezzi, Mohammad Ali (2007). "ISLAM IN IRAN vii. THE CONCEPT OF MAHDI IN TWELVER SHIʿISM". Encyclopaedia Iranica. Vol. XIV/2. pp. 136–143.
- Amir-Moezzi, Mohammad Ali (1998). "ESCHATOLOGY iii. Imami Shiʿism". Encyclopaedia Iranica. Vol. VIII/6. pp. 575–581.
- Amir-Moezzi, Mohammad Ali (2016). Divine Guide in Early Shi'ism: The Sources of Esotericism in Islam. SUNY Press. ISBN 9780791494790.
- Hulmes, Edward D.A. (2013). "HASAN AL-'ASKARI, ABU MUHAMMAD HASAN IBN 'ALI (c. AD 845-74)". In Netton, Ian Richard (ed.). Encyclopedia of Islamic Civilization and Religion. Routledge. p. 217. ISBN 9781135179670.
