= Abu Ja'far Muhammad ibn Uthman =

Deputy of Imam Muhammad al-Mahdi (died 917)

Muḥammad ibn ʿUthmān al-ʾAsadī
- محمد بن عثمان الأسدي

Deputy of Imam Muhammad al-Mahdi
- In office 881–917
- Preceded by: Uthman ibn Sa'id al-Asadi
- Succeeded by: Abu al-Qasim al-Husayn ibn Ruh al-Nawbakhti

Personal life
- Died: 917 CE Baghdad
- Region: Iraq
- Known for: Second of the Four Deputies

Religious life
- Religion: Islam
- Denomination: Shia
- Jurisprudence: Ja'fari
- Creed: Twelver

Muslim leader
- Disciple of: Muhammad al-Mahdi
- Influenced: Abu al-Qasim al-Husayn ibn Ruh al-Nawbakhti, Abu al-Hasan Ali ibn Muhammad al-Samarri

Abū Jaʿfar Muḥammad ibn ʿUthmān ibn Saʿīd al-ʿAmrī al-Asadī (Arabic: أبو جعفر محمد بن عثمان بن سعيد العمري الأسدي) was the second of the Four Deputies, who are believed by Twelver Shia Muslims to have successively represented their twelfth Imam, Muhammad al-Mahdi, during his Minor Occultation (874–941 CE). Abu Ja'far in this role succeeded his father, Uthman ibn Sa'id al-Asadi, the first deputy. After some forty years in office, Abu Ja'far died in 304 or 305 AH (917 or 918 CE) and was succeeded by Ibn Ruh al-Nawbakhti, the third deputy. Abu Ja'far has been credited with the unification of the mainstream Shia.

== Historical background ==
Until their deaths, the tenth and eleventh Shia Imams (Ali al-Hadi and Hasan al-Askari, respectively) were held in the garrison town of Samarra under close surveillance (or house arrest) by the Abbasids, who are often responsible in Shia sources for poisoning the two Imams. The two Imams witnessed the deterioration of the Abbasid caliphate, as the imperial authority rapidly transitioned into the hands of the Turks, particularly after al-Mutawakkil.

Contemporary to the tenth Imam, the Abbasid al-Mutawakkil violently prosecuted the Shia, partly due to a renewed Zaydi opposition. The restrictive policies of al-Mutawakkil towards the tenth Imam were later adopted by his son, al-Mu'tamid, who is reported to have kept the eleventh Imam under house arrest without any visitors. Instead, al-Askari is known to have primarily communicated with his followers through a network of representatives. Among them was Uthman ibn Sa'id, who is said to have disguised himself as a seller of cooking fat to avoid the Abbasid agents, hence his nickname al-Samman. Tabatabai suggests that these restrictions were placed on al-Askari because the caliphate had come to know about traditions among the Shia elite, predicting that the eleventh Imam would father the eschatological Mahdi.

Immediately after the death of al-Askari in 260 (874), Uthman ibn Sa'id (d. 880) claimed that the eleventh Imam had a young son, named Muhammad, who had entered a state of occultation (ghayba) due to the Abbasid threat to his life. As the special agent of al-Askari, Uthman also claimed that he had been appointed to represent the son of the eleventh Imam. Twelver sources detail that Muhammad al-Mahdi made his only public appearance to lead the funeral prayer for his father instead of his uncle, Ja'far.

Thus began a period of about seventy years, later termed the Minor Occultation (al-ghaybat al-sughra, 260-329 AH, 874–940 CE), during which it is believed that four successive agents represented the Hidden Imam, collectively known as the Four Deputies (al-nuwwab al-arba'). An agent (wakil) was variously called deputy (na'ib), emissary (safir), and gate (bab).

== Tenure as an agent of al-Mahdi ==
Abu Ja'far succeeded his father, Uthman ibn Sa'id, in this role. As with his father, Abu Ja'far was earlier a representative of al-Askari. Tusi in his Rijal reports that the eleventh Imam had appointed Abu Ja'far and his father as agents of his son, Muhammad, in the presence of a group of Yemeni followers. Shortly after the death of his father, Abu Ja'far is said to have received a letter of condolence from the Hidden Imam. Abu Ja'far, who served for some forty years in this office, has been credited with the unification of the mainstream Shia behind the son of al-Askari as the twelfth Imam in concealment. In this task, Abu Ja'far was assisted by Abu Sahl al-Nawbakhti (d. 923), a renowned Twelver theologian of this period, whose ties with the Abbasid court helped spread the Twelver beliefs. Abu Ja'far died in 304 or 305 (917 or 918) and was succeeded by Ibn Ruh al-Nawbakhti.

Sometime after 279 (879), the office of deputyship relocated to Baghdad from Samarra, following the footsteps of the Abbasid court. Especially during the caliphates of al-Muqtadir and al-Radi, the Twelver leadership in Baghdad could also rely on the support and protection of some powerful Twelver families who were in the service of the Abbasids, such as the Ibn al-Furat and Banu Nawbakht families.

== Works ==
Among other books about Islamic jurisprudence, Abu Ja'far wrote Kitab al-Ashriba (lit. 'book on beverages'). This book, according to his daughter, was handed down to the third agent, Ibn Ruh al-Nawbakhti, and then to the last agent, al-Samarri.

== See also ==
- Uthman ibn Sa'id al-Asadi
- Abu al-Qasim al-Husayn ibn Ruh al-Nawbakhti
- Abu al-Hasan Ali ibn Muhammad al-Samarri

== Sources ==
- Eliash, J. (2022). "Ḥasan Al-ʿAskarī". In Bearman, P. (ed.). Encyclopaedia of Islam (Second ed.). Brill Reference Online.
- Klemm, Verena (2007). ISLAM IN IRAN ix. THE DEPUTIES OF MAHDI. Vol. XIV/2. pp. 143–6.
- Sachedina, Abdulaziz Abdulhussein (1981). Islamic Messianism: The Idea of Mahdī in Twelver Shīʻism. Suny press. ISBN 978-0873954426.
- Daftary, Farhad (2013). A History of Shi'i Islam. I.B. Tauris. ISBN 9780755608669.
- Hussain, Jassim M. (1986). Occultation of the Twelfth Imam: A Historical Background. Routledge Kegan & Paul. ISBN 9780710301581.
- Momen, Moojan (1985). An Introduction to Shi'i Islam. Yale University Press. ISBN 9780300034998.
- Tabatabai, Sayyid Mohammad Hosayn (1975). Shi'ite Islam. Translated by Sayyid Hossein Nasr. State University of New York Press. ISBN 0-87395-390-8.
- Donaldson, Dwight M. (1933). The Shi'ite Religion: A History of Islam in Persia and Iraḳ. AMS Press.
- Modarressi, Hossein (1993). Crisis and Consolidation in the Formative Period of Shi'ite Islam: Abū Ja'far Ibn Qiba Al-Rāzī and His Contribution to Imāmite Shī'ite Thought (PDF). Darwin Press. ISBN 9780878500956. Archived from the original (PDF) on 2022-06-16.
- Holt, P.M.; Lambton, Ann K.S.; Lewis, Bernard, eds. (1970). The Cambridge history of Islam. Vol. 1. Cambridge University Press.
- Amir-Moezzi, Mohammad Ali (2007). "ISLAM IN IRAN vii. THE CONCEPT OF MAHDI IN TWELVER SHIʿISM". Encyclopaedia Iranica. Vol. XIV/2. pp. 136–143.
- Amir-Moezzi, Mohammad Ali (1998). "ESCHATOLOGY iii. Imami Shiʿism". Encyclopaedia Iranica. Vol. VIII/6. pp. 575–581.
- Amir-Moezzi, Mohammad Ali (2016). Divine Guide in Early Shi'ism: The Sources of Esotericism in Islam. SUNY Press. ISBN 9780791494790.
- Hulmes, Edward D.A. (2013). "HASAN AL-'ASKARI, ABU MUHAMMAD HASAN IBN 'ALI (c. AD 845-74)". In Netton, Ian Richard (ed.). Encyclopedia of Islamic Civilization and Religion. Routledge. p. 217. ISBN 9781135179670.
