= Uthman ibn Sa'id al-Asadi =

First ambassador of Imam Muhammad al-Mahdi

ʿUthmān ibn Saʿīd al-Asadī al-ʿAmrī
- عثمان بن سعيد الأسدي العمري

Deputy of Imam Muhammad al-Mahdi
- In office 874–881
- Succeeded by: Abu Ja'far Muhammad ibn Uthman

Personal life
- Died: before 881 CE Baghdad
- Region: Iraq
- Known for: Agent of Ali al-Hadi; Agent of al-Hasan al Askari; First of the Four Deputies

Religious life
- Religion: Islam
- Denomination: Shia
- Jurisprudence: Ja'fari
- Creed: Twelver

Muslim leader
- Disciple of: Ali al-Hadi, Hasan al-Askari, Muhammad al-Mahdi

ʿUthmān ibn Saʿīd alʾAsadī al-ʿAmrī (Arabic: عثمان بن سعيد الأسدي العمري) was the first of the Four Deputies, whom Twelver Shia Muslims believe have successively represented their twelfth Imam, Muhammad al-Mahdi, during his Minor Occultation (874–941 CE). Uthman is also said to have been a trusted representative (wakīl or safīr or bāb) of the tenth and eleventh Imams Ali al-Hadi (835–868) and Hasan al-Askari (868–874) respectively. The date of his death is not certain, but most Shia scholars agree that it was in 880-81.

== Historical background ==
Until their deaths, the tenth and eleventh Shia Imams (Ali al-Hadi and Hasan al-Askari, respectively) were held under close surveillance in the garrison town of Samarra by the Abbasids, who are often responsible in Shia sources for poisoning the two Imams. The two Imams witnessed the deterioration of the Abbasid caliphate, as the imperial authority rapidly transitioned into the hands of the Turks, particularly after al-Mutawakkil.

Contemporary to the tenth Imam, the Abbasid al-Mutawakkil violently prosecuted the Shia, partly due to the renewed Zaydi opposition. The restrictive policies of al-Mutawakkil towards the tenth Imam were later adopted by his son, al-Mu'tamid, who is reported to have kept the eleventh Imam under house arrest without any visitors. Instead, al-Askari is known to have mainly communicated with his followers through a network of representatives. Among them was Uthman ibn Sa'id, who is said to have disguised himself as a seller of cooking fat to avoid the Abbasid agents, hence his nickname al-Samman ("the one who sells samn"). Tabatabai suggests that these restrictions were placed on al-Askari because the caliphate had come to know about traditions among the Shia elite, predicting that the eleventh Imam would father the eschatological Mahdi.

=== Underground network ===
The underground network of representatives might date back to Ja'far al-Sadiq, the sixth Imam, in response to the Abbasid restrictions on him. At the time, the main purpose of this network was to collect the Islamic alms, such as khums and zakat. The Abbasid al-Rashid is said to have carried out a campaign of arrests in 179 (795) to decimate this underground network which ultimately led to the arrest of Musa al-Kazim, the seventh Imam, and his death in prison.

By the time of Muhammad al-Jawad, the ninth Imam, some of the representatives took administrative and military roles in the caliphate by practicing religious dissimulation (taqiya). The underground network of Ali al-Hadi, the tenth Imam, was highly developed, especially in Samarra, Baghdad, Mada'in, and Sawad. However, a campaign of arrests and the subsequent tortures by the Abbasid al-Mutawakkil (r. 847–861) might have led the caliph to discover that the Imam was behind their activities. Al-Mutawakkil then summoned the Imam to Samarra, where he was kept under close surveillance and possibly house arrest. According to Hussain, restrictions on the later Imams inevitably expanded the role and authority of their representatives, particularly their main agent. By performing certain functions of the Imams, these representatives might have hoped to save the Imams from the political pressure of the Abbasids.

== Tenure as an agent of al-Hadi ==
Uthman was a close associate of the tenth Imam, Ali al-Hadi. It is reported that he was eleven when he first served as an agent for this Imam.

== Tenure as an agent of al-Askari ==
After the death of al-Hadi in 254 (868), his successor, Hasan al-Askari, appointed Uthman as a representative in 256 (869-70). It also seems certain that Uthman became the closest associate of the eleventh Imam. Both al-Hadi and al-Askari are said to have praised Uthman as highly trustworthy. As a representative of the two Imams, Uthman disguised himself as a seller of cooking fat to avoid the Abbasid agents, hence his nickname al-Samman. It is reported that he collected religious donations, hid them in the containers of cooking fat, and delivered them to al-Askari. After the death of al-Askari in 260 (874), Uthman performed the funeral rites of the eleventh Imam, an honor for which he must have received the permission of al-Askari beforehand.

== Tenure as an agent of al-Mahdi ==
Immediately after the death of al-Askari in 260 (874), Uthman claimed that the eleventh Imam had a young son, named Muhammad, who had entered a state of occultation (ghayba) due to the Abbasid threat to his life. As the special agent of al-Askari, Uthman also claimed that he had been appointed to represent the son of the eleventh Imam. Twelver sources detail that Muhammad al-Mahdi made his only public appearance to lead the funeral prayer for his father instead of his uncle, Ja'far.

As the closest associate of al-Askari, the local representatives and the Shia community largely recognized Uthman's claim to be the agent of the Hidden Imam. However, there were possibly doubts among the Shia about Uthman's authority to collect and distribute the religious donations. In his new capacity as the caretaker of the office of imamate, Uthman also received petitions and made available their responses, sometimes in writing.

The date of his death is not certain, but it is believed that Uthman did not survive al-Askari for long. Klemm holds that Uthman died in 880 CE. Uthman was succeeded by his son, Abu Ja'far Muhammad, as the next agent of the Hidden Imam. Tusi in his Rijal reports that the eleventh Imam had appointed Uthman and his son as agents of his son, Muhammad, in the presence of a group of Yemeni followers.

== See also ==
- Abu Ja'far Muhammad ibn Uthman
- Abu al-Qasim al-Husayn ibn Ruh al-Nawbakhti
- Abu al-Hasan Ali ibn Muhammad al-Samarri

== Sources ==
- Eliash, J. (2022). "Ḥasan Al-ʿAskarī". In Bearman, P. (ed.). Encyclopaedia of Islam (Second ed.). Brill Reference Online.
- Klemm, Verena (2007). ISLAM IN IRAN ix. THE DEPUTIES OF MAHDI. Vol. XIV/2. pp. 143–6.
- Sachedina, Abdulaziz Abdulhussein (1981). Islamic Messianism: The Idea of Mahdī in Twelver Shīʻism. Suny press. ISBN 978-0873954426.
- Daftary, Farhad (2013). A History of Shi'i Islam. I.B. Tauris. ISBN 9780755608669.
- Hussain, Jassim M. (1986). Occultation of the Twelfth Imam: A Historical Background. Routledge Kegan & Paul. ISBN 9780710301581.
- Momen, Moojan (1985). An Introduction to Shi'i Islam. Yale University Press. ISBN 9780300034998.
- Tabatabai, Sayyid Mohammad Hosayn (1975). Shi'ite Islam. Translated by Sayyid Hossein Nasr. State University of New York Press. ISBN 0-87395-390-8.
- Donaldson, Dwight M. (1933). The Shi'ite Religion: A History of Islam in Persia and Iraḳ. AMS Press.
- Modarressi, Hossein (1993). Crisis and Consolidation in the Formative Period of Shi'ite Islam: Abū Ja'far Ibn Qiba Al-Rāzī and His Contribution to Imāmite Shī'ite Thought (PDF). Darwin Press. ISBN 9780878500956. Archived from the original (PDF) on 2022-06-16.
- Holt, P.M.; Lambton, Ann K.S.; Lewis, Bernard, eds. (1970). The Cambridge history of Islam. Vol. 1. Cambridge University Press.
- Amir-Moezzi, Mohammad Ali (2007). "ISLAM IN IRAN vii. THE CONCEPT OF MAHDI IN TWELVER SHIʿISM". Encyclopaedia Iranica. Vol. XIV/2. pp. 136–143.
- Amir-Moezzi, Mohammad Ali (1998). "ESCHATOLOGY iii. Imami Shiʿism". Encyclopaedia Iranica. Vol. VIII/6. pp. 575–581.
- Amir-Moezzi, Mohammad Ali (2016). Divine Guide in Early Shi'ism: The Sources of Esotericism in Islam. SUNY Press. ISBN 9780791494790.
- Hulmes, Edward D.A. (2013). "HASAN AL-'ASKARI, ABU MUHAMMAD HASAN IBN 'ALI (c. AD 845-74)". In Netton, Ian Richard (ed.). Encyclopedia of Islamic Civilization and Religion. Routledge. p. 217. ISBN 9781135179670.
