= Kitab al-Ghayba (al-Nu'mani) =

10th-century Shia Islamic book

The Kitāb al-Ghayba (Arabic: كتاب الغيبة, lit. 'Book of Occultation') is a book by the 10th-century Shia scholar Muhammad ibn Ibrahim al-Nu'mani on the subject of the occultation of the last Twelver Imam Muhammad al-Mahdi in 873–4 (260 AH). The aim of the book was to refute the existing doubts about the occultation and to support it by reason and narration.

== Author ==
Muhammad ibn Ibrahim al-Nu'mani was reportedly a pupil of al-Kulayni (c. 864–941). He wrote this work around 953, and died in 970.

== Motivation ==
Much doubt and skepticism existed in al-Nu'mani's time about the occultation (ghayba) of the last Twelver Imam Muhammad al-Mahdi in 873–4 (260 AH). In his book, al-Nu'mani wrote that, having noticed how the Shia followers were perplexed by the event of the occultation, he wanted to try and save them from this perplexity. He also tried to show that the doubt and ignorance of people originated from the concerns of worldly and mortal aims. There are many references to the characters and symbols occulted to Imam.

== See also ==
- List of Shia books
- Occultation (Islam)
  - Minor occultation
  - Major occultation
- Mikyal al-Makaarim
