= David Cook (historian) =

American historian of Islam

David Cook is an American historian and professor of the history of Islam at Rice University in Houston, Texas, United States. He earned his PhD from the University of Chicago and is known for his research on Islamic apocalypticism, jihad, martyrdom, and contemporary Islamic movements.

== Works ==
David Cook has written several books on Islamic apocalypticism, jihad, martyrdom, and contemporary Islamic movements. He has also translated and edited works in Islamic history, including The Book of Tribulations: The Syrian Muslim Apocalyptic Tradition, an English translation and study of Nuʿaym ibn Ḥammād's Kitāb al-Fitan. Some of his important books are:

- Studies in Muslim Apocalyptic. Princeton: Darwin Press, 2003, in the series "Studies in Late Antiquity and Early Islam".
- Contemporary Muslim Apocalyptic Literature. Syracuse: Syracuse University Press, 2005. Syracuse University Press
- Understanding Jihad. Berkeley: University of California Press, 2005. University of California Press ISBN 978-052024203-6
- Martyrdom in Islam. Cambridge: Cambridge University Press, 2007.
- Understanding and Addressing Suicide Attacks (with Olivia Allison). Westport, CT: Praeger Press, 2007.
- The Book of Tribulations: The Syrian Muslim Apocalyptic Tradition. Edinburgh: Edinburgh University Press, 2018. Edinburgh University Press
- Syria down to Saladin: Ibn Asakir's History of the City of Damascus. Edinburgh: Edinburgh University Press, 2026. Edinburgh University Press
