= Abdulaziz Sachedina =

Tanzanian-born American Islamic scholar (1942–2025)

Abdulaziz Abdulhussein Sachedina
- Born: 1942; Tanganyika Territory
- Died: 3 December 2025 (aged 83)
- Citizenship: American
- Education: Aligarh Muslim University (BA); Ferdowsi University (BA (Hons)); University of Toronto (MA, PhD)

Abdulaziz Abdulhussein Sachedina (1942 – 3 December 2025) was a Tanzanian-born American Islamic scholar who was a professor and the International Institute of Islamic Thought (IIIT) Chair in Islamic Studies at George Mason University in Fairfax, Virginia.

== Life and career ==
Sachedina was born in 1942 in Tanganyika Territory, though his heritage originally was from India. He had an MA/PhD from the University of Toronto and BA degrees from Aligarh Muslim University in India, and Ferdowsi University of Mashad in Iran. Sachedina was a professor from 1975. He annually taught courses on Classical Islam, Islam in the Modern Age, Islam, Democracy and Human Rights, Islamic Bioethics and Muslim Theology. He was a member of the editorial board of the journal Islam and Christian-Muslim Relations.

In 1997, Grand Ayatollah Lotfollah Safi Golpaygani thanked him for his translation of a book on Imam Mahdi into English, originally written by Ayatollah Ebrahim Amini. The acknowledgement letter was published by the Iranian Hawza magazine.

In 1998, Grand Ayatollah Sistani issued a statement against Sachedina that advised Muslims not to listen to his talks or to ask him questions about religious matters. (See original text in Persian).

He spoke Hindi, Urdu, Persian, Arabic, Gujarati, Swahili, and English.

Sachedina died on 3 December 2025, at the age of 83.

== Bibliography ==
- The Just Ruler in Shi'ite Islam: The Comprehensive Authority of the Jurist in Imamite Jurisprudence Oxford University Press Inc (USA), 1998, ISBN 0-19-511915-0
- The Islamic Roots of Democratic Pluralism Oxford University Press Inc (USA), 2000, ISBN 0-19-513991-7
- The Islamic World: Past and Present John L. Esposito (Editor), Abdulaziz Abdulhussein Sachedina (Editor): Oxford University Press Inc (USA), 2004, ISBN 0-19-516520-9
- Islamic Biomedical Ethics Oxford University Press (USA), 2009, ISBN 0-19-537850-4
- Islamic Messianism State Univ of New York Press (USA), 1981, ISBN 0-87395-458-0
- Human Rights and the Conflict of Cultures co-authored with David Little and John Kelsay: South Carolina Press (USA), 1988, ISBN 0-87249-533-7
- Prolegomena to the Qur'an" being trans of Abu al-Qasim al-Khui's Al-Bayan Oxford University Press (USA), 1988
- Recueil de textes du professeur Abdulaziz Sachedina, Editions Publibook (France), 2008, ISBN 978-2-7483-4253-6
- Islamic messianism: the idea of Mahdī in twelver Shīʻism, State University of New York, 1981, ISBN 0-87395-442-4
