= List of Alawites =

This list of Alawites includes prominent Alawite figures, mostly Syrians, who are notable in their areas of expertise.

== Arts, culture, and entertainment ==
- Adunis, poet
- Badawi al-Jabal, poet
- Jamal Suliman, film producer
- Hasan al-Khayer, poet
- Suzan Najm Aldeen, actress
- Taim Hasan, actor
- Haluk Levent, Turkish singer
- Fadwa Souleimane, actress
- Wafa Sultan, Syrian-American writer
- Man Asaad, heavyweight weightlifter
- Dina Haroun, actress
- Farrah Yousef, singer
- Samar Yazbek, writer
- Nebil Özgentürk, Turkish journalist and director

== Economy ==
- Mohammed Makhlouf, Syrian businessman
- Rami Makhlouf, Syrian businessman

== Government and politics ==
- Zaki al-Arsuzi
- Ali al-Assad
- Hafez al-Assad
- Bashar al-Assad
- Salah Jadid
- Rifaat al-Assad
- Jamil al-Assad
- Bushra al-Assad
- Zulema Yoma
- Mohammed Nasif Kheirbek
- Ghazi Kanaan
- Ali Eid, former leader of the Arab Democratic Party of Lebanon
- Rifaat Eid, current leader of the ADP
- Ahmad Hassan
- Muhsen Bilal
- Ali Hammoud
- Monzer Makhous
- Tülay Hatimoğulları

== Military and security ==
- Salih al-Ali
- Ali Aslan
- Maher al-Assad
- Bassel al-Assad
- Hafez Makhlouf
- Dhu al-Himma Shalish
- Ali Haydar
- Ali Abdullah Ayyoub
- Muhammad al-Khuli
- Jamil Hassan
- Ali Duba
- Shafiq Fayadh
- Adnan Badr Hassan
- Ali Habib Mahmud
- Mihrac Ural, Turkish guerrilla fighter, leader of the Syrian Resistance

== Religion ==
- Ibn Nusayr, founder of the Alawites
- Al-Khasibi, a 10th-century scholar of the Alawites
- Ghazal Ghazal, head of the Supreme Alawite Islamic Council in Syria and abroad
- Ali Qaddour, head of the Islamic Alawite Council in Lebanon
