= Alawism =

Offshoot of Shia Islam in the Levant

- 'Alawiyya
- A logo featuring the names Ali, Muhammad, and Salman each repeated four times interlocked in the shape of a flower; the design reflects a core tenet of the Alawite faith.
- Shaykh: Ghazal Ghazal
- Region: Levant
- Language: Arabic
- Founder: Ibn Nusayr, Al-Khasibi
- Origin: 9th-century Iraq
- Separated from: Shia Islam
- Separations: Murshidism
- Members: approx. 4 million

Alawism (Arabic: علوية, romanized: ʿAlawiyya), also pejoratively known as Nusayrism (Arabic: نصيرية, romanized: Nuṣayriyya), is an offshoot of early Shia Islam with influences from ancient Iranian, Christian, and Gnostic traditions. Its adherents, called the Alawites, are estimated to number around 4 million and are primarily concentrated in the Levant. Alawites venerate Ali ibn Abi Talib, the first imam in the Twelver Shi'ism school, as a manifestation of the divine essence.

Alawite beliefs are centered in a divine Trinity, comprising three aspects of the one God, the ma'na (meaning), the ism (name), and the bab (door). These emanations are understood to have undergone reincarnation cyclically seven times in human form throughout history, the last seventh incarnation being that of Ali, Muhammad and Salman the Persian. Alawite practices include consecration of wine in the form of Mass, entombing the deceased in sarcophagi, observing cultural holidays such as Akitu, Christmas, Nowruz, Mawlid and Gazwela.

Alawism originated in 9th-century Iraq as a ghulat sect that separated from Shia Islam led by Ibn Nusayr, a preacher from the aristocratic Banu Numayr clan. The Alawites were organized in Aleppo during Hamdanid rule in Syria by al-Khasibi, a missionary who had gained patronage from Emir Sayf al-Dawla (r. 945–967). In the 11th–12th-century, the Alawite community were budded to the Syrian Coastal Mountain Range with the help of the Banu Muhriz. Later, the Alawites faced severe persecution by waves of the Crusaders, Mamluks, and by Ottoman conquerors. In the aftermath of the First World War, the Alawite State was established in coastal Syria. Although the state was later dismantled, Alawite figures continued to play a pivotal role in the Syrian military and later in the Ba'ath Party. The 1970 coup d'état led by Hafez al-Assad, an Alawite, resulted in the establishment of an Alawite-led government that continued under his son, Bashar al-Assad, who was eventually overthrown in December 2024 by opposition forces led by Hay'at Tahrir al-Sham during the Syrian civil war.

Fabrice Balanche wrote in 2024 that some core beliefs of the Alawites are rejected by orthodox theologians of Sunni and Shia Islam, with medieval scholar Ibn Taymiyyah calling for the sect to be eradicated. Balanche describes a lonely fatwa by Hajj Amin al-Husseini recognising them as Muslims, given in 1932 at a time when Alawites were denied this formal status, as based on immediate political, anticolonial considerations. Alawism is one of the main religious groups in the Middle East, with over 4 million followers. They are primarily located in Lebanon, Syria, and Turkey. Alawism is the third largest-religion in Syria, accounting for 10% of the country. As the only ghulat sect alive, it faces persecution by Islamist extremists.

== Etymology ==
Ali, Muhammad, and Salman each repeated four times interlocked in the shape of a flower.

The term Alawite is derived from the Arabic word Alawi, denoting the "followers of Ali". The community historically self-identified as Nusayrites, named after their religious founder Ibn Nusayr. However, the term "Nusayri" had fallen out of currency by the 1920s and is now seen as a pejorative term for Alawites as a movement led by intellectuals within the community during the French mandate sought to replace it with "Alawite". Another term applied to the group was Ansari, which, according to Samuel Lyde, was a term that the mid-19th-century Alawites used among themselves. However, others indicate that Ansari is simply a Western error in the transliteration of Nusayri.

The French were known to have popularised the term Alawite. The community also characterised the older name (which implied "a separate ethnic and religious identity") as an "invention of the sect's enemies", ostensibly favouring an emphasis on "connection with mainstream Islam"—particularly the Shia branch. As such, "Nusayrite" is now regarded as antiquated, and has even come to have insulting and abusive connotations. The term was frequently employed as hate speech by Sunni fundamentalists fighting against Bashar al-Assad's government in the Syrian civil war, who use its emphasis on Ibn Nusayr to insinuate that Alawi beliefs are "man-made" and not divinely inspired. Necati Alkan argued in an article that the "Alawi" appellation was used in an 11th-century Nusayri book and was not a 20th-century invention. The following quote from the same article illustrates his point:

Statue of Zulfiqar, the sword of Ali, in the Alawite village of Ghajar in the Golan Heights

"As to the change from "Nuṣayrī" to "ʿAlawī": most studies agree that the term "ʿAlawī" was not used until after WWI and probably coined and circulated by Muḥammad Amīn Ghālib al-Ṭawīl, an Ottoman official and writer of the famous Taʾrīkh al-ʿAlawiyyīn (1924). However, the name 'Alawī' appears in an 11th-century Nuṣayrī tract as one of the names of the believer (...). Moreover, the term 'Alawī' was already used at the beginning of the 20th century. In 1903 the Belgian-born Jesuit and Orientalist Henri Lammens (d. 1937) visited a certain Ḥaydarī-Nuṣayrī sheikh Abdullah in a village near Antakya and mentions that the latter preferred the name 'Alawī' for his people. Lastly, it is interesting to note that in the above-mentioned petitions of 1892 and 1909 the Nuṣayrīs called themselves the 'Arab Alawī people' (ʿArab ʿAlevī ṭāʾifesi) 'our ʿAlawī Nuṣayrī people' (ṭāʾifatunā al-Nuṣayriyya al-ʿAlawiyya) or 'signed with Alawī people' (ʿAlevī ṭāʾifesi imżāsıyla). This early self-designation is, in my opinion, of triple importance. Firstly, it shows that the word 'Alawī' was always used by these people, as ʿAlawī authors emphasize; secondly, it hints at the reformation of the Nuṣayrīs, launched by some of their sheikhs in the 19th century and their attempt to be accepted as part of Islam; and thirdly, it challenges the claims that the change of the identity and name from 'Nuṣayrī' to 'ʿAlawī' took place around 1920, in the beginning of the French mandate in Syria (1919–1938)."

The Alawites are distinct from the Alevi sect in Turkey, although the terms share a common etymology and pronunciation. To avoid confusion with the ethnic Turkish and Kurdish Alevis, the Alawites call themselves Arap Alevileri ("Arab Alevis") in Turkish. The term Nusayrī, previously used in theological texts, has been revived in recent studies. A quasi-official name used during the 1930s by Turkish authorities was Eti Türkleri ("Hittite Turks"), to conceal their Arabic origins. Although this term is obsolete, it is still used by some older people as a euphemism.

== Beliefs ==
Statue of Ali with lions in the Alawite village of Ghajar

Alawites and their beliefs have been described as "secretive". Yaron Friedman, for example, in his scholarly work on the sect, has written that the Alawi religious material quoted in his book came only from "public libraries and printed books" since the "sacred writings" of the Alawi "are kept secret". (Note: Since the sacred writings of the Nuṣayrī-ʿAlawīs are kept secret by the members of the sect because of their sensitivity, the religious material used in this volume is only that which is accessible in public libraries and printed books.) (Note: According to Alawite beliefs, women are not permitted to engage in religious studies.) Some tenets of the faith are kept secret from most Alawi and known only to a select few. They have, therefore, been described as a mystical sect.

Alawite doctrines originated from the teachings of Iraqi priest Muhammad ibn Nusayr, who claimed prophethood, declared himself the "Bāb (Door) of the Imams", and attributed divinity to Hasan al-Askari. Al-Askari denounced Ibn Nusayr, and Islamic authorities expelled his disciples, most of whom emigrated to the Syrian Coastal Mountain Range, wherein they established a distinct community. Nusayri theology treats Ali, the cousin of the prophet Muhammad, as a manifestation of "the supreme eternal God" and holds a range of gnostic beliefs. Alawite doctrine regards the souls of Alawites as reincarnations of "lights that rebelled against God."

Modern religious authorities have never confirmed Alawites' beliefs. As a highly secretive and esoteric sect, Nusayri priests tend to conceal their core doctrines, which are introduced only to a chosen minority of the sect's adherents. Alawites have also adopted the practice of taqiya to avoid victimization.

=== Theology and practices ===
Alawites celebrating at a festival in Banyas, Syria, WWII

Alawite doctrine incorporates elements of Phoenician mythology, Gnosticism, neo-Platonism, and Christian trinitarianism (for example, they celebrate Mass, including the consecration of bread and wine), blending them with Muslim symbolism in a syncretic fashion.

The Alawite trinity envisions God as composed of three distinct manifestations: the Bab (Door), the Ism (Name), and the Ma'na (Meaning), which together constitute an "indivisible Trinity". Ma'na symbolises the "source and meaning of all things" in Alawite mythology; Ma'na generated the Ism, which built the Bab. These beliefs are closely tied to the Nusayri doctrine of reincarnations of the Trinity.

Many Alawites do not believe in daily Muslim prayers (salah). The Alawites venerate Ali as a physical manifestation of God, with the group's testimony of faith (shahada) translating to "there is no God but Ali". The Alawite God consists of Ali (Ma'na), Muhammad (Ism) and Salman the Persian (Bab), depicted as the sky, sun, and moon, respectively. Alawites deify Ali as the "last and supreme manifestation of God", who built the universe, attribute to him divine superiority, and believe that Ali created Muhammad and gave him the mission to spread Qur'anic teachings on Earth.

The Oxford Encyclopedia of the Modern Islamic World classifies Alawites as part of extremist Shia sects referred to as the ghulat, owing to the secretive nature of the Alawite religious system and hierarchy. Due to their esoteric doctrines of strict secrecy, conversions into the community were also forbidden.

==== Reincarnation ====
Alawites hold that they were originally stars or divine lights that were cast out of heaven through disobedience and must undergo repeated reincarnation (or metempsychosis) before returning to Heaven. Females are considered excluded from reincarnation.

Alawite theologians divided history into seven eras, associating each era with one of the seven reincarnations of the Alawite Trinity (Ma'na, Ism, and the Bab). The seven reincarnations can be summarized in the following table.

The seven eras in Alawite theology
Era	Ma'na (Meaning)	Ism (Name)	Bab (Gate)
1	Abel	Adam	Gabriel
2	Seth	Noah	Yail ibn Fatin
3	Joseph	Jacob	Ham ibn Kush
4	Joshua	Moses	Dan ibn Usbaut
5	Asaph	Solomon	Abd Allah ibn Siman
6	Saint Peter	Jesus	Rawzaba ibn al-Marzuban
7	Ali	Muhammad	Salman the Persian

The last triad of reincarnations in the Nusayri Trinity consists of Ali (Ma'na), Muhammad (Ism), and Salman the Persian (Bab).

==== Other beliefs ====
Statue of Saint George, who is identified with Khidr, in Ghajar

Other beliefs and practices include: the consecration of wine in a secret form of Mass performed only by males; frequently being given Christian names; entombing the dead in sarcophagi above ground; observing Epiphany, Christmas and the feast days of John Chrysostom and Mary Magdalene. The only religious structures they have are the shrines of tombs; and the book Kitab al-Majmu, which is supposedly a central source of Alawite doctrine, defines a trinity comprising Muhammad, Ali, and Salman the Persian.

In addition, Alawism celebrates non-Muslim holidays like Gazwela, (Note: The Old New Year is celebrated on 13 January, and named as Gawzela Day (يوم القوزلة), as it means "igniting the fire" in Syriac language.) Akitu, (Note: The festival is celebrated on 17 April according to the Julian calendar, which is based on 4 April in the Gregorian calendar.), and Eid il-Burbara. Alawism offers prayers for the intercession of some legendary saints, such as Khidr (Saint George) and Simeon Stylites.

John Myhill of the Israeli institution of Begin–Sadat Center for Strategic Studies describes Alawism as Judeophilic and "anti-Sunni" since it posits that God's incarnations consist of the Israelite prophet Joshua (who conquered Canaan) in addition to the fourth Caliph, Ali.

==== Development ====
1879 French map of the Syrian Coastal Mountain Range, here called the "Mountains of the Ansaris", by Léon Cahun

Yaron Friedman and many researchers of Alawi doctrine write that the founder of the religion, Ibn Nusayr, did not necessarily believe he was representative of a splinter, rebel group of the Shias, but believed he held the true doctrine of the Shias and most of the aspects that are similar to Christianity are considered more a coincidence and not a direct influence from it, as well as other external doctrines that were popular among Shia esoteric groups in Basra in the 8th century. According to Friedman and other scholars, the Alawi movement started as many other mystical ghulat sects with an explicit concentration on an allegorical and esoteric meaning of the Quran and other mystical practices, and not as a pure syncretic sect, though later, they embraced some other practices, as they believed all religions had the same Batin core.

Journalist Robert F. Worth argues that the idea that Alawism is a branch of Islam is a rewriting of history made necessary by the French colonialists' abandonment of the Alawites and departure from Syria. Worth describes the "first [...] authentic source for outsiders about the religion", written by Soleyman of Adana – a 19th-century Alawi convert to Christianity who broke his oath of secrecy on the religion, explaining that the Alawi, according to Soleyman, deified Ali, venerated Jesus, Muhammad, Plato, Socrates, and Aristotle, and held themselves apart from Muslims and Christians, whom they considered heretics. According to Tom Heneghan:

Alawite religion is often called “an offshoot of Shi’ism,” Islam’s largest minority sect, but that is something like referring to Christianity as “an offshoot of Judaism.” Alawites broke away from Shi’ism over 1,000 years ago.

According to a disputed letter, in 1936, six Alawi notables petitioned the French colonialists not to merge their Alawi enclave with the rest of Syria, insisting that "the spirit of hatred and fanaticism embedded in the hearts of the Arab Muslims against everything that is non-Muslim has been perpetually nurtured by the Islamic religion." However, according to associate professor Stefan Winter, this letter is a forgery. According to Worth, later fatwas declaring Alawi to be part of the Shia community were by Shia clerics "eager for Syrian patronage" from Syria's Alawi president Hafez al-Assad, who sought Islamic legitimacy in the face of the hostility of Syria's Muslim majority.

Yaron Friedman does not suggest that Alawites did not consider themselves Muslims, but does state that:

The modern period has witnessed tremendous changes in the definition of the ʿAlawīs and the attitude towards them in the Muslim world. [...] In order to end their long isolation, the name of the sect was changed in the 1920s from Nusạyriyya to ʿAlawiyya'. By taking this step, leaders of the sect expressed not only their link to Shīʿism, but to Islam in general.

According to Peter Theo Curtis, the Alawism underwent a process of "Sunnification" during Hafez al-Assad's rule so that Alawites became not Shia but effectively Sunni. Public manifestations or "even mentioning of any Alawite religious activities" were banned, as were any Alawite religious organizations, and "any formation of a unified religious council" or a higher Alawite religious authority. "Sunni-style" mosques were built in every Alawite village, and Alawis were encouraged to perform Hajj. The grand mosque in Qardaha, the hometown of the Assad family, was dedicated to Abu Bakr, who is venerated by Sunnis but not Shias.

== Islamic opinions ==
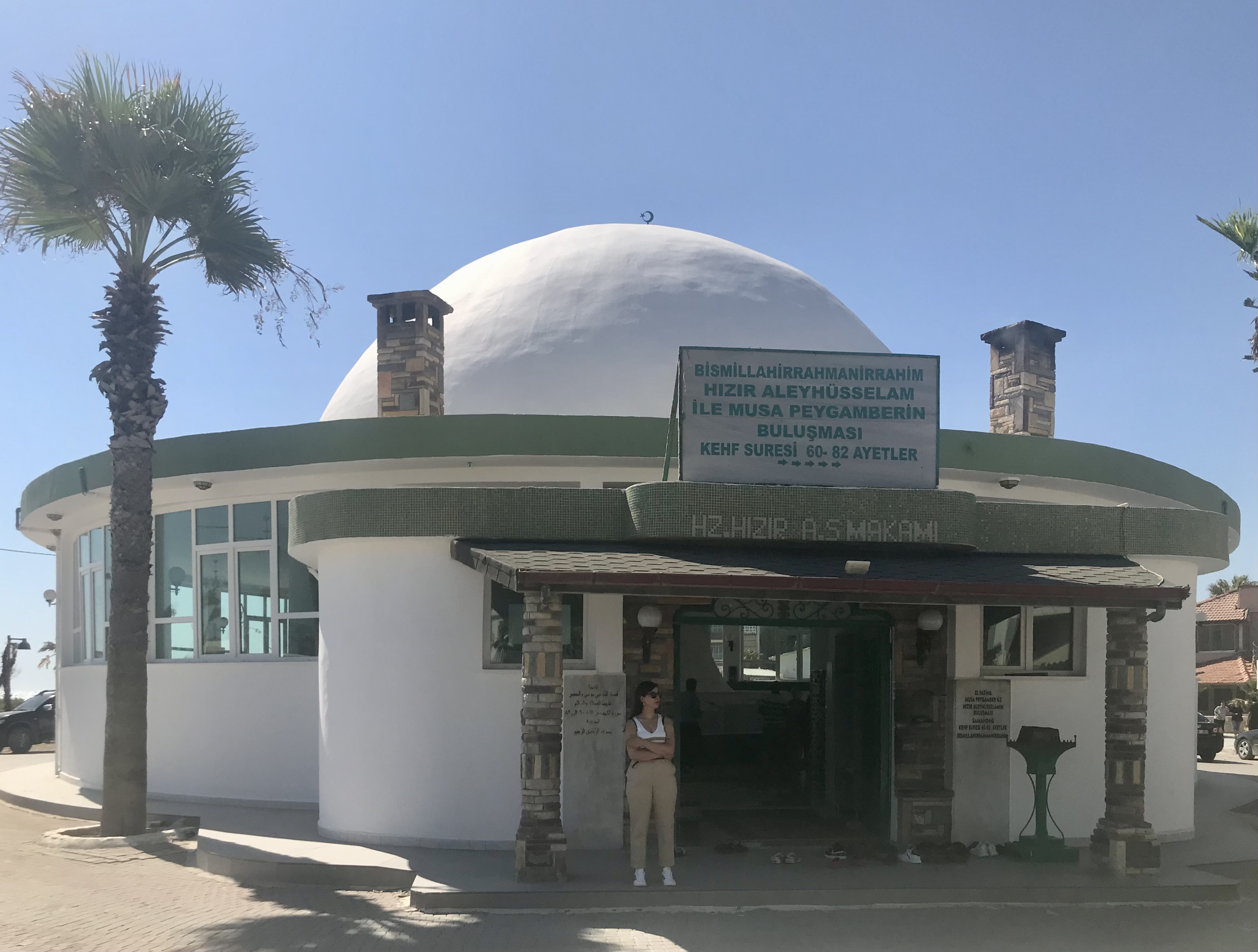
The Shrine of Khidr, located near the Syria–Turkey border, is a notable Alawite shrine frequently visited by people from multiple cities.

The Alawites have historically regarded themselves a separate religious group. Similarly, classical Shia Muslims and Sunni Muslims considered Alawism to be out of the fold of Islam. Syrian historian Ibn Kathir (c. 1300–1373) categorized Alawites as non-Muslim and mushrik (polytheist), in their writings. Ibn Taymiyya (1263–1328), Ibn Kathir's mentor and arguably the most polemical anti-Alawite Sunni theologian, categorised Alawite as non-Muslims and listed them amongst the worst sects of polytheists. Through many of his fatwas, Ibn Taymiyya described Alawites as "the worst enemies of the Muslims" who were far more dangerous than Crusaders and Mongols. Ibn Taymiyya also accused Alawites of aiding the Crusades and Mongol invasions against the Muslim World. Other Sunni scholars, such as Al-Ghazali (c. 1058–1111), likewise considered them as non-Muslims. Benjamin Disraeli, in his novel Tancred, also expressed the view that Alawites are not Shia Muslims.

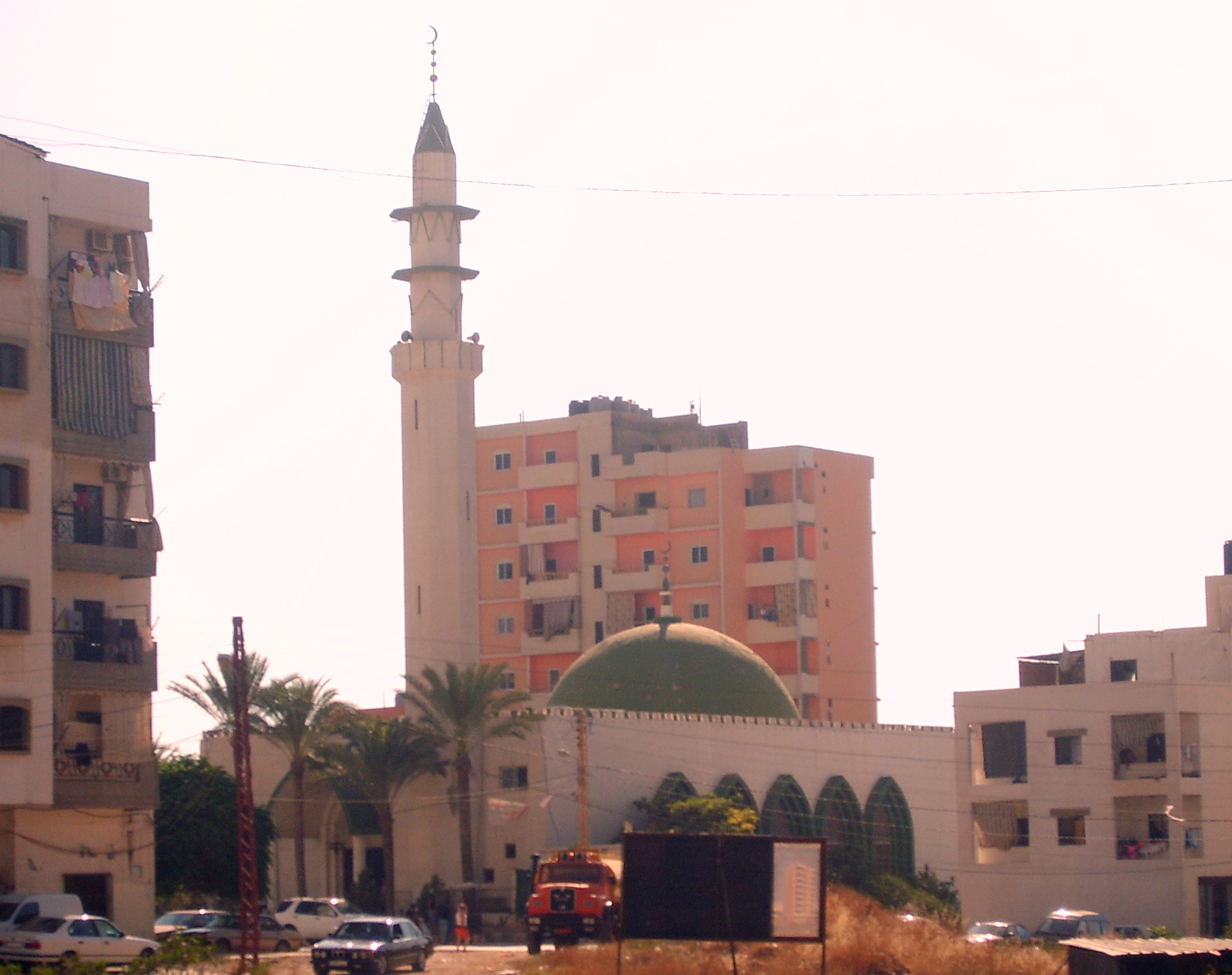
The Alawite Imam Ali Mosque in Jabal Mohsen, Tripoli, Lebanon

Twelver Shia scholars (such as Shaykh Tusi) did not consider Alawites as Shia Muslims while condemning their heretical beliefs.

However, during the Ba'athist rule, Hafez al-Assad (r. 1971–2000) and his son and successor Bashar al-Assad (r. 2000–2024) pressed their fellow Alawites "to behave like 'regular Muslims', shedding (or at least concealing) their distinctive aspects". During the early 1970s, a booklet, al-'Alawiyyun Shi'atu Ahl al-Bait (lit. 'The Alawites are Followers of the Household of the Prophet') was published, which was "signed by numerous 'Alawi' men of religion", described the doctrines of the Imami Shia as Alawite. The relationship between Alawite-ruled Ba'athist Syria and Khomeinist Iran has been described as a "marriage of convenience" due to the former being ruled by the secularist Arab Socialist Ba'ath party and the latter by the anti-secular Twelver Shi'ite clergy. The alliance was established during the Iran-Iraq war in the 1980s, when Hafez al-Assad backed Iran against his Iraqi Ba'athist rivals, departing from the consensus of the rest of the Arab world. Iranian-backed militant groups like Hezbollah, Liwa Fatemeyoun, etc., have been acting as proxy forces for the Assad regime in various conflicts in the region, such as the Lebanese Civil War, the 2006 Lebanon War and the Syrian civil war.

Some sources have discussed the "Sunnification" of Alawites under the Ba'athist-led regime. Joshua Landis, director of the Center for Middle East Studies, writes that Hafez al-Assad "tried to turn Alawites into 'good' (read Sunnified) Muslims in exchange for preserving a modicum of secularism and tolerance in society". On the other hand, al-Assad "declared the Alawites to be nothing but Twelver Shiites". In a paper, "Islamic Education in Syria", Landis wrote that "no mention" is made in Syrian textbooks, controlled by the Ba'athist-led regime, of Alawites, Druze, Ismailis or Shia Islam; Islam was presented as a monolithic religion. Alawites currently number around 4 million in the world.

== Bibliography ==
- Atwan, Abdel Bari (2015). Islamic State: The Digital Caliphate. Oakland: University of California Press. ISBN 978-0-520-28928-4.
- Alkan, Necati (2012). Fighting for the Nuṣayrī Soul: State, Protestant Missionaries and the ʿAlawīs in the Late Ottoman Empire. Die Welt des Islams, 52.
- Baltacıoğlu-Brammer, Ayşe (November 2013). "Alawites and the Fate of Syria". Origins: Current Events in Historical Perspective. The Ohio State University.
- Clymer, R. Swinburne (1 April 2003). Initiates and The People Part 2, May 1929 to June 1930. Kessinger Publishing. ISBN 978-0-7661-5376-9.
- Cosman, Madeleine Pelner; Jones, Linda Gale (2009). "The Nusayriyya Alawis". Handbook to Life in the Medieval World, 3-Volume Set. Infobase Publishing. ISBN 978-1-4381-0907-7.
- Feldman, Noah (2020). The Arab Winter: A Tragedy. Princeton University Press. ISBN 978-0-691-20144-3.
- Friedman, Yaron (2010). The Nuṣayrī-ʿAlawīs : An Introduction to the Religion, History and Identity of the Leading Minority in Syria (PDF). Islamic History and Civilization. Vol. 77. Leiden, Boston: Brill. doi:10.1163/ej.9789004178922.i-328. ISBN 978-90-04-178922.
- Goldsmith, Leon (2012). The Politics of Sectarian Insecurity: Alawite 'Asabiyya and the Rise and Decline of the Asad Dynasty of Syria (PhD). University of Otago.
- Herbermann, Charles George (2005). Encyclopaedia of Sects & Religious Doctrines. Vol. 1 (3rd ed.). Cosmo Publications. ISBN 9788177559286.
- Ismail, Raihan (2016). Saudi Clerics and Shī'a Islam. Oxford University Press. ISBN 978-0-19-023331-0.
- Moosa, Matti (1987). Extremist Shiites: The Ghulat Sects (1st ed.). Syracuse University Press. ISBN 0-8156-2411-5.
- Nisan, Mordechai (2002). "6: Alawites: To Power and the Unknown". Minorities in the Middle East (2nd ed.). McFarland & Company, Inc. ISBN 978-0-7864-1375-1.
- Peters, F.E. (2009). The Monotheists: Jews, Christians, and Muslims in Conflict and Competition, Volume II. Princeton University Press. ISBN 978-1400825714.
- Pipes, Daniel (1992). Greater Syria. Oxford University Press. ISBN 978-0-19-536304-3.
- Procházka-Eisl, Gisela; Procházka, Stephan (2010). The Plain of Saints and Prophets: The Nusayri-Alawi Community of Cilicia (Southern Turkey) and its Sacred Places. Otto Harrassowitz Verlag. ISBN 978-3-447-06178-0.
- Rubin, Barry (2015). The Middle East: A Guide to Politics, Economics, Society and Culture. Routledge. ISBN 9781317455783.
- Rubin, Barry (2007). The Truth About Syria. New York: Palgrave Macmillan. ISBN 978-1-4039-8273-5.
- Rolland, John C. (2003). Lebanon: Current Issues and Background. Nova Publishers. ISBN 978-1-59033-871-1.
- Sorenson, David S. (2013). An Introduction to the Modern Middle East: History, Religion, Political Economy, Politics (2nd, reprint, revised ed.). Hachette UK. ISBN 0813349230.
- Worth, Robert F. (2016). A Rage for Order: The Middle East in Turmoil, from Tahrir Square to ISIS. Pan Macmillan. ISBN 9780374710712.
- van Dam, Nikolaos (2017). "Introduction: Greater Syria or Bilad al-Sham". Destroying a Nation: The Civil War in Syria. New York, USA: I. B. Tauris. ISBN 978-1-78453-797-5.

=== Web sources ===
- "Erdogan, Iran, Syrian Alawites, and Turkish Alevis". The Weekly Standard. 29 March 2012. Archived from the original on 30 March 2012.
- "Syria's Alawites, a secretive and persecuted sect". Reuters. 2 February 2012.
- "The 'secretive sect' in charge of Syria". BBC. 17 May 2012.
- Al-Tamimi, Aymenn Jawad (24 January 2013). "Anti-Islamism in an Islamic Civil War". The American Spectator. Archived from the original on 25 September 2013.
- Benitez, Juan Carlos (9 December 2021). "The Assad Family Has Been Shaping Syria for 50 Years". Fair Observer. Archived from the original on 9 December 2021.
- Landis, Joshua (15 December 2013). "Zahran Alloush: His Ideology and Beliefs". Syria Comment. Archived from the original on 25 March 2016.
- Howse, Christopher (5 August 2011). "Secretive sect of the rulers of Syria". The Daily Telegraph.
