= Alawites =

Ethnoreligious group centered in Syria

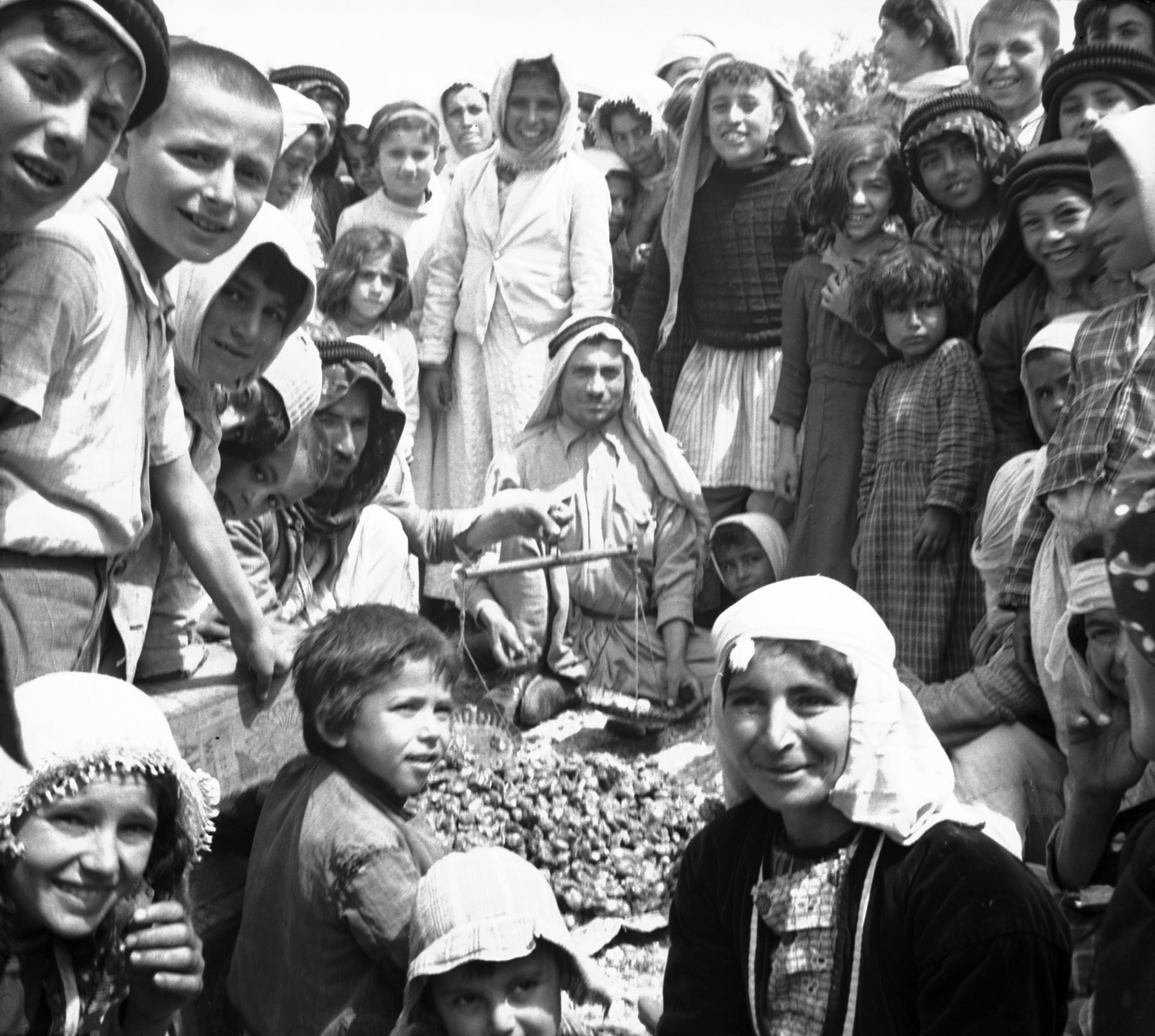
- Alawites celebrating at a festival in Baniyas, Syria during World War II

Total population
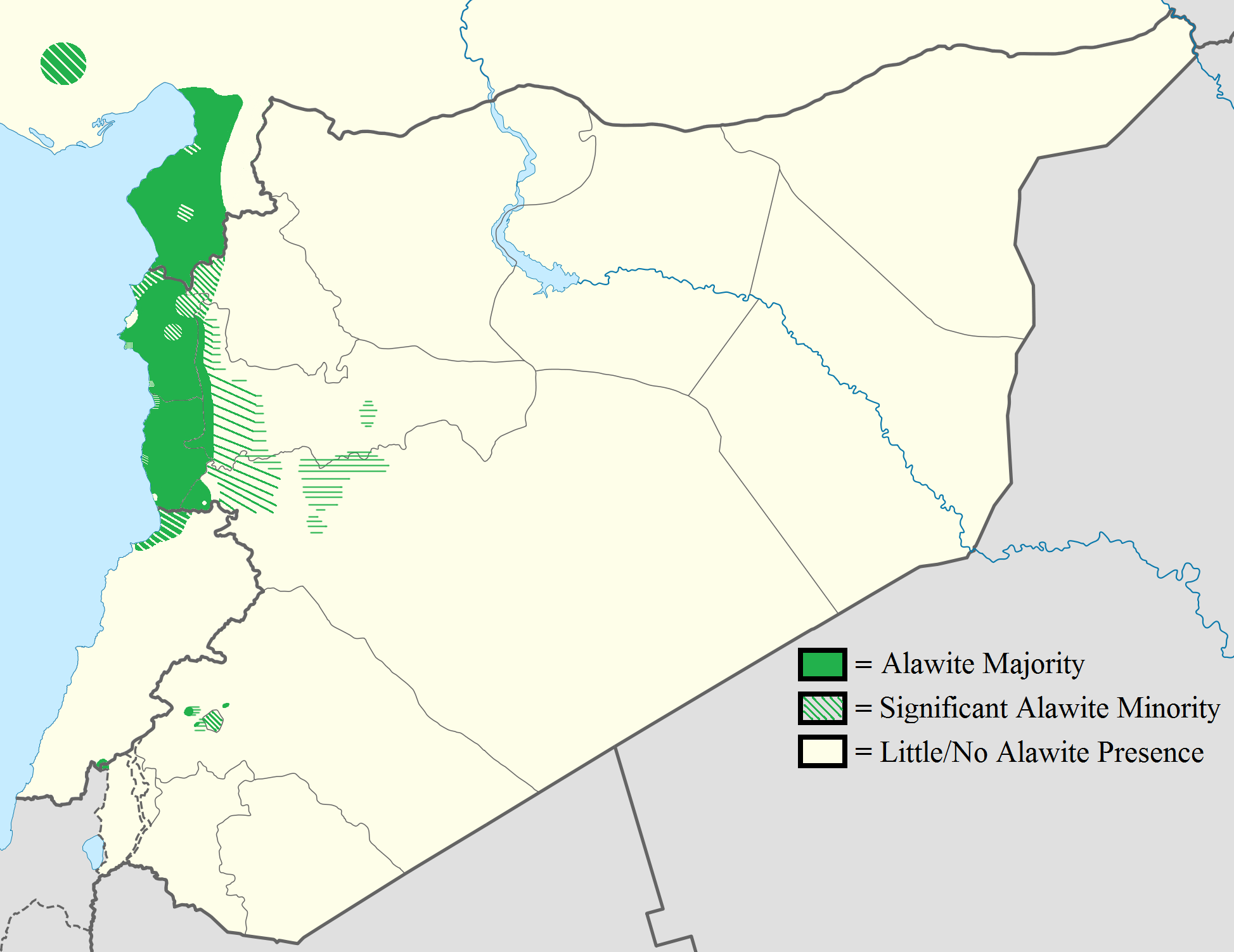
- approx. 2 to 3 million

Founder
- Ibn Nusayr and Al-Khasibi

Regions with significant populations
- Syria: 1 - 2 million
- Turkey: 350,000
- Argentina: 180,000
- Lebanon: 150,000
- Germany: 70,000
- Australia: 43,000 (Note: Approximately 2% of Lebanese-born people in Australia)

Languages
- Levantine Arabic, Turkish

Alawites (Arabic: العلويون, romanized: al-ʿAlawiyyūn) are an ethnoreligious group who identify as Arabs, who live primarily in Syria and elsewhere in the Levant. They follow Alawism, an offshoot of Shia Islam as a ghulat branch during the ninth century. Alawites venerate Ali ibn Abi Talib, the first Imam in Shia Islam, as a manifestation of the divine essence. The group was founded during the ninth century by Ibn Nusayr, who was a disciple of the tenth Twelver Imam, Ali al-Hadi, and of the eleventh Twelver Imam, Hasan al-Askari. For this reason, Alawites are also called Nusayris, although this term can be considered derogatory in the present day.

Surveys suggest Alawites represent an important portion of the Syrian population and are a significant minority in the Hatay Province of Turkey and northern Lebanon. There is also a population living in the village of Ghajar in the Golan Heights, where there had been two other Alawite villages (Ayn Fit and Za'ura) before the Six-Day War. The Alawites form the dominant religious group on the Syrian coast and towns near the coast, which are also inhabited by Sunnis, Christians, and Ismailis. They are often confused with the Alevis, a religious group in Turkey that shares certain similarities with the Alawites but has key differences.

The Quran is one of their holy books, but its interpretation differs significantly from Shia Muslim interpretations and aligns with early Batiniyya and other ghulat sects. Alawite theology and rituals differ sharply from Shia Islam in several important ways. For instance, various Alawite rituals involve the drinking of wine and the sect does not prohibit the consumption of alcohol for its adherents. As a creed that teaches the symbolic/esoteric reading of Qur'anic verses, Alawite theology is based on the belief in reincarnation and views Ali as a divine incarnation of God. Moreover, Alawite clergy and scholars insist that their religion is theologically distinct from Shi'ism. Alawites have historically kept their beliefs secret from outsiders and non-initiated Alawites, so rumours about them have arisen. Arabic accounts of their beliefs tend to be partisan (either positively or negatively). However, since the early 2000s, Western scholarship on the Alawite religion has made significant advances. At the core of the Alawite creed is the belief in a divine Trinity, comprising three aspects of the one God. The aspects of the Trinity are Mana (meaning), Ism (Name) and Bab (Door). Alawite beliefs hold that these emanations underwent re-incarnation cyclically seven times in human form throughout history. According to Alawites, the seventh incarnation of the trinity consists of Ali ibn Abi Talib (Muhammad's cousin and son-in-law), Muhammad himself, and Salman al-Farisi, a Persian companion of Muhammad.

A lone 1932 fatwa by Hajj Amin al-Husseini recognising them as Muslims has been seen as based on immediate political, anticolonial considerations. Alawites have faced periods of subjugation or persecution under various Muslim empires such as the Ottomans, Abbasids, Mamluks, and others. The establishment of the French Mandate of Syria in 1920 marked a turning point in Alawite history. Until then, the community had commonly self-identified as "Nusayris", emphasizing their connections to Ibn Nusayr. The French administration prescribed the label "Alawite" to categorise the sect alongside Shiism in official documents. The French recruited a large number of minorities into their armed forces and created exclusive areas for minorities, including the Alawite State. The Alawite State was later dismantled, but the Alawites continued to play a significant role in the Syrian military and later in the Ba'ath Party. After Hafez al-Assad's seizure of power during the 1970 coup, the Ba'athist state enforced Assadist ideology amongst Alawites to supplant their traditional identity. During the Syrian revolution, communal tensions were further exacerbated as the country destabilized into a full-scale sectarian civil war.

== Etymology ==
In older sources, Alawis are often called "Ansaris". According to Samuel Lyde, who lived among the Alawites during the mid-19th century, this was a term they used among themselves. Other sources indicate that "Ansari" is simply a Western error in the transliteration of "Nusayri". Alawites historically self-identified as Nusayrites, (Note: Arabic: نصيرية, romanized: Nuṣayriyya) after their religious founder Ibn Nusayr al-Numayri. However, the term "Nusayri" had fallen out of currency by the 1920s, as a movement led by intellectuals within the community during the French Mandate sought to replace it with the modern term "Alawi". They characterised the older name (which implied "a separate ethnic and religious identity") as an "invention of the sect's enemies", ostensibly favouring an emphasis on "connection with mainstream Islam"—particularly the Shia branch. The term "Nusayrites" is now used as a slur and was frequently used as such by Sunni fundamentalists fighting against Bashar al-Assad's government in the Syrian civil war, who use its emphasis on Ibn Nusayr to insinuate that Alawi beliefs are "man-made" and not divinely inspired.

Statue of Zulfiqar, the sword of Ali, in the Alawite village of Ghajar in the Golan Heights

Necati Alkan argued in an article that the "Alawi" appellation was used in an 11th-century Nusayri book and was not a 20th-century invention. The following quote from the same article illustrates his point:

As to the change from "Nuṣayrī" to "ʿAlawī": most studies agree that the term "ʿAlawī" was not used until after WWI and probably coined and circulated by Muḥammad Amīn Ghālib al-Ṭawīl, an Ottoman official and writer of the famous Taʾrīkh al-ʿAlawiyyīn (1924). However, the name 'Alawī' appears in an 11th century Nuṣayrī tract as one of the names of the believer (...). Moreover, the term 'Alawī' was already used at the beginning of the 20th century. In 1903 the Belgian-born Jesuit and Orientalist Henri Lammens (d. 1937) visited a certain Ḥaydarī-Nuṣayrī sheikh Abdullah in a village near Antakya and mentions that the latter preferred the name 'Alawī' for his people. Lastly, it is interesting to note that in the above-mentioned petitions of 1892 and 1909 the Nuṣayrīs called themselves the 'Arab Alawī people' (ʿArab ʿAlevī ṭāʾifesi) 'our ʿAlawī Nuṣayrī people' (ṭāʾifatunā al-Nuṣayriyya al-ʿAlawiyya) or 'signed with Alawī people' (ʿAlevī ṭāʾifesi imżāsıyla). This early self-designation is, in my opinion, of triple importance. Firstly, it shows that the word 'Alawī' was always used by these people, as ʿAlawī authors emphasize; secondly, it hints at the reformation of the Nuṣayrīs, launched by some of their sheikhs in the 19th century and their attempt to be accepted as part of Islam; and thirdly, it challenges the claims that the change of the identity and name from 'Nuṣayrī' to 'ʿAlawī' took place around 1920, in the beginning of the French mandate in Syria (1919–1938).

The Alawites are distinct from the Alevi religious sect in Turkey, although the terms share a common etymology and pronunciation.

== Genealogical origin theories ==
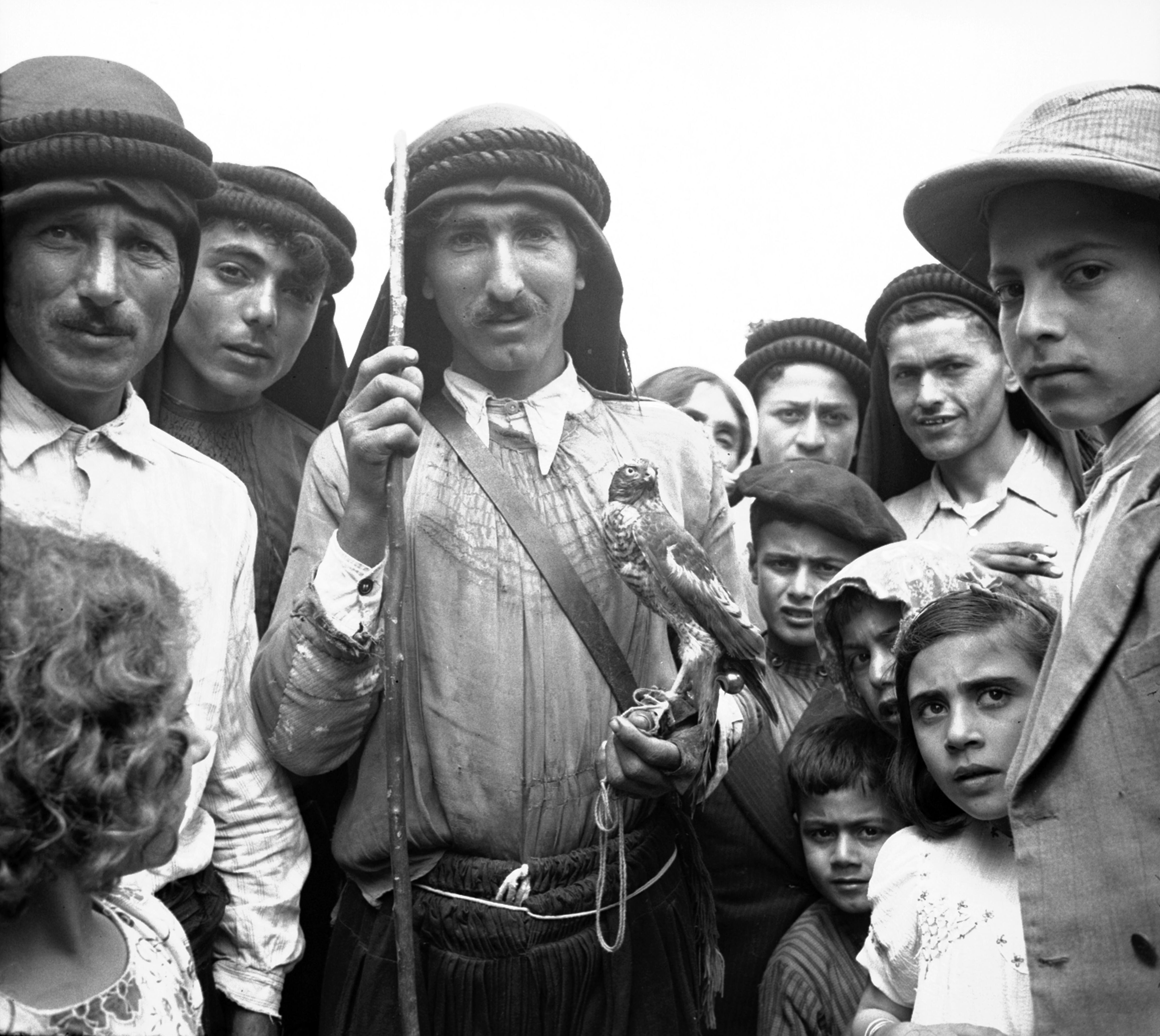
An Alawite falconer photographed by Frank Hurley in Baniyas, Syria during World War II

The origin of the genetics of Alawites is disputed. Local folklore suggests that they are descendants of the followers of the eleventh Imam, Hasan al-Askari (d. 873), and his pupil, Ibn Nusayr (d. 868). During the 19th and 20th centuries some Western scholars believed that Alawites were descended from ancient Middle Eastern peoples such as the Arameans, Canaanites, Hittites, and Mardaites. Many prominent Alawite tribes are also descended from 13th century settlers from Sinjar.

In his Natural History, Book V, Pliny the Elder said:

We must now speak of the interior of Syria. Coele Syria has the town of Apamea, divided by the river Marsyas from the Tetrarchy of the Nazerini.

The "Tetrarchy of the Nazerini" refers to the western region, between the Orontes and the sea, which consists of a small mountain range called Alawi Mountains bordered by a valley running from southeast to northwest known as Al-Ghab Plain; the region was populated by a portion of Syrians, who were called Nazerini. However scholars are reluctant to link Nazerini and Nazarenes. Yet the term "Nazerini" can be possibly connected to words which include the Arabic triliteral root n-ṣ-r such as the subject naṣer in Eastern Aramaic, which means "keeper of wellness".

== History ==
Ibn Nusayr and his followers are considered the founders of the religion. After the death of the Eleventh Imam, al-Askari, problems emerged in the Shia Community concerning his succession, and then Ibn Nusayr claimed to be the Bab and Ism of the deceased Imam and that he received his secret teachings. Ibn Nusayr and his followers' development seems to be one of many other early ghulat mystical Islamic sects, and were apparently excommunicated by the Shia representatives of the 12th Hidden Imam.

The Alawites were later organised during Hamdanid rule in northern Syria (947–1008) by a follower of Muhammad ibn Nusayr known as al-Khaṣībī, who died in Aleppo about 969, after a rivalry with the Ishaqiyya sect, which claimed also to have the doctrine of Ibn Nusayr. The embrace of Alawism by the majority of the population in the Syrian coastal mountains was likely a protracted process occurring over several centuries. Modern research indicates that after its initial establishment in Aleppo, Alawism spread to Sarmin, Salamiyah, Homs and Hama before becoming concentrated in low-lying villages west of Hama, including Baarin, Deir Shamil, and Deir Mama, the Wadi al-Uyun valley, and in the mountains around Tartus and Safita.

In 1032, al-Khaṣībī's grandson and pupil, Abu Sa'id Maymun al-Tabarani (d. 1034), moved to Latakia (then controlled by the Byzantine Empire). Al-Tabarani succeeded his mentor al-Jilli of Aleppo as head missionary in Syria and became "the last definitive scholar of Alawism", founding its calendar and giving Alawite teachings their final form, according to the historian Stefan Winter. Al-Tabarani influenced the Alawite faith through his writings and by converting the rural population of the Syrian Coastal Mountain Range.

1879 French map of the Syrian Coastal Mountain Range, here called the "Mountains of the Ansaris", by Léon Cahun

Winter argues that while it is likely the Alawite presence in Latakia dates to Tabarani's lifetime, it is unclear if Alawite teachings spread to the city's mountainous hinterland, where the Muslim population generally leaned toward Shia Islam, in the eleventh century. In the early part of the century, the Jabal al-Rawadif (part of the Syrian Coastal Mountains around Latakia) were controlled by the local Arab chieftain Nasr ibn Mushraf al-Rudafi, who vacillated between alliance and conflict with Byzantium. There is nothing in the literary sources indicating al-Rudafi patronized the Alawites.

To the south of Jabal al-Rawadif, in the Jabal Bahra, a 13th-century Alawite treatise mentions the sect was sponsored by the Banu'l-Ahmar, Banu'l-Arid, and Banu Muhriz, three local families who controlled fortresses in the region in the 11th and 12th centuries. From this southern part of the Syrian coastal mountain range, a significant Alawite presence developed in the mountains east of Latakia and Jableh during the Mamluk period (1260s–1516).

According to Bar Hebraeus, many Alawites were killed when the Crusaders initially entered Syria in 1097; however, they tolerated them when they concluded they were not a truly Islamic sect. They even incorporated them within their ranks, along with the Maronites and Turcopoles. Two prominent Alawite leaders in the following centuries, credited with uplifting the group, were Shaykhs al-Makzun (d. 1240) and al-Tubani (d. 1300), both originally from Mount Sinjar in modern Iraq.

In the 14th century, the Alawites were forced by Mamluk Sultan Baibars to build mosques in their settlements, to which they responded with token gestures described by the Muslim traveller Ibn Battuta.

=== Ottoman Empire ===
Alawites practising jereed jousting in Qardaha while Ottoman soldiers spectate, from the 1879 travelogue of Cahun

During the reign of Sultan Selim I, of the Ottoman Empire, the Alawites would again experience significant persecution; especially in Aleppo when a massacre occurred in the Great Mosque of Aleppo on 24 April 1517. The massacre was known as the "Massacre of the Telal" (Arabic: مجزرة التلل) in which the corpses of thousands of victims accumulated as a tell located west of the castle. The horrors of the massacre which caused the immigration of the survivors to the coastal region are documented at the National and University Library in Strasbourg.

The Ottoman Empire took aggressive actions against Alawites, due to their alleged "treacherous activities" as "they had a long history of betraying the Muslim governments due to their mistrust towards Sunnis." The Alawis rose up against the Ottomans on several occasions, and maintained their autonomy in their mountains.

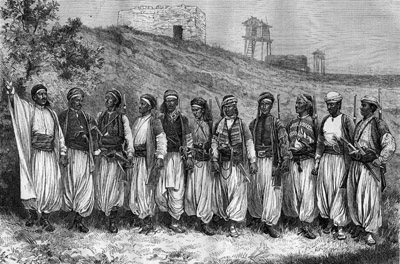
Alawites dancing dabke, by Cahun, 1879

In his book Seven Pillars of Wisdom T. E. Lawrence wrote:

The sect, vital in itself, was clannish in feeling and politics. One Nosairi would not betray another, and would hardly not betray an unbeliever. Their villages lay in patches down the main hills to the Tripoli gap. They spoke Arabic, but had lived there since the beginning of Greek letters in Syria. Usually they stood aside from affairs, and left the Turkish Government alone in hope of reciprocity.

During the 18th century, the Ottomans employed a number of Alawite leaders as tax collectors under the iltizam system. Between 1809 and 1813, Mustafa Agha Barbar, the governor of Tripoli, attacked the Kalbiyya Alawites with "marked savagery." Some Alawites supported Ottoman involvement in the Egyptian-Ottoman Wars of 1831–1833 and 1839–1841, and had careers in the Ottoman army or as Ottoman governors. Moreover, they even initiated the Alawite revolt (1834–35) against the Egyptian rule of the region, which was later suppressed by the Governor of Homs.

By the mid-19th century, the Alawite people, customs and way of life were described by Samuel Lyde, an English missionary among them, as suffering from nothing except a gloomy plight. Early in the 20th century, the mainly-Sunni Ottoman leaders were bankrupt and losing political power; the Alawites were poor peasants.

=== French Mandate period ===
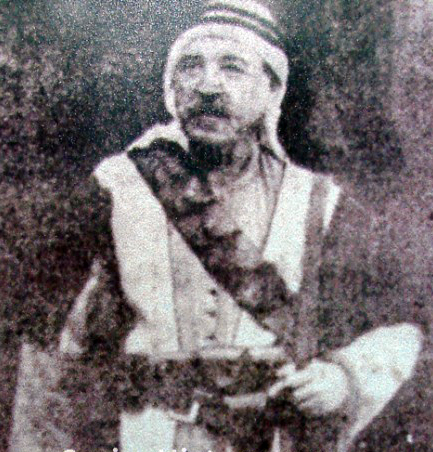
Saleh al-Ali, leader of the Alawite revolt of 1919

After the end of World War I and the fall of the Ottoman Empire, Syria and Lebanon were placed by the League of Nations under the French Mandate for Syria and Lebanon. On 15 December 1918, Alawite leader Saleh al-Ali called for a meeting of Alawite leaders in the town of Al-Shaykh Badr, urging them to revolt and expel the French from Syria.

When French authorities heard about the meeting, they sent a force to arrest Saleh al-Ali. He and his men ambushed and defeated the French forces at Al-Shaykh Badr, inflicting more than 35 casualties. After this victory, al-Ali began organizing his Alawite rebels into a disciplined force, with its general command and military ranks.

The Al-Shaykh Badr skirmish began the Syrian Revolt of 1919. Al-Ali responded to French attacks by laying siege to (and occupying) al-Qadmus, from which the French had conducted their military operations against him. In November, General Henri Gouraud mounted a campaign against Saleh al-Ali's forces in the Alawi Mountains. His forces entered al-Ali's village of Al-Shaykh Badr, arresting many Alawi leaders; however, al-Ali fled to the north. When a large French force overran his position, he went underground.

Despite these instances of opposition, the Alawites mostly favoured French rule and sought its continuation beyond the mandate period.

==== Alawite State ====
A map of French Mandate states in 1921–22. The Alawite State is in purple.

When the French began to occupy Syria in 1920, an Alawite State was created in the coastal and mountain country comprising most Alawite villages. The division was intended to protect the Alawite people from more powerful majorities, such as the Sunnis.

The French also created microstates, such as Greater Lebanon for the Maronite Christians and Jabal al-Druze for the Druze. Aleppo and Damascus were also separate states. Under the Mandate, many Alawite chieftains supported a separate Alawite nation, and tried to convert their autonomy into independence.

The French Mandate Administration encouraged Alawites to join their military forces, in part to provide a counterweight to the Sunni majority, which was more hostile to their rule. According to a 1935 letter by the French minister of war, the French considered the Alawites and the Druze the only "warlike races" in the Mandate territories. Between 1926 and 1939, the Alawites and other minority groups provided the majority of the locally recruited component of the Army of the Levant—the designation given to the French military forces garrisoning Syria and the Lebanon.

One form of the flag of the Sanjak of Latakia or Alawite State in northwest Syria under French colonial rule, ca. 1920–1936

The region was home to a mostly-rural, heterogeneous population. The landowning families and 80 percent of the population of the port city of Latakia were Sunni Muslims; however, in rural areas 62 percent of the population were Alawite. According to some researchers, there was considerable Alawite separatist sentiment in the region, their evidence is a 1936 letter signed by 80 Alawi leaders addressed to the French Prime Minister which said that the "Alawite people rejected attachment to Syria and wished to stay under French protection." Among the signatories was Sulayman Ali al-Assad, father of Hafez al-Assad. However, according to Associate Professor Stefan Winter, this letter is a forgery. Even during this time of increased Alawite rights, the situation was still so bad for the group that many women had to leave their homes to work for urban Sunnis.

In May 1930, the Alawite State was renamed the Government of Latakia in one of the few concessions by the French to Arab nationalists before 1936. Nevertheless, on 3 December 1936, the Alawite State was re-incorporated into Syria as a concession by the French to the National Bloc (the party in power in the semi-autonomous Syrian government). The law went into effect in 1937.

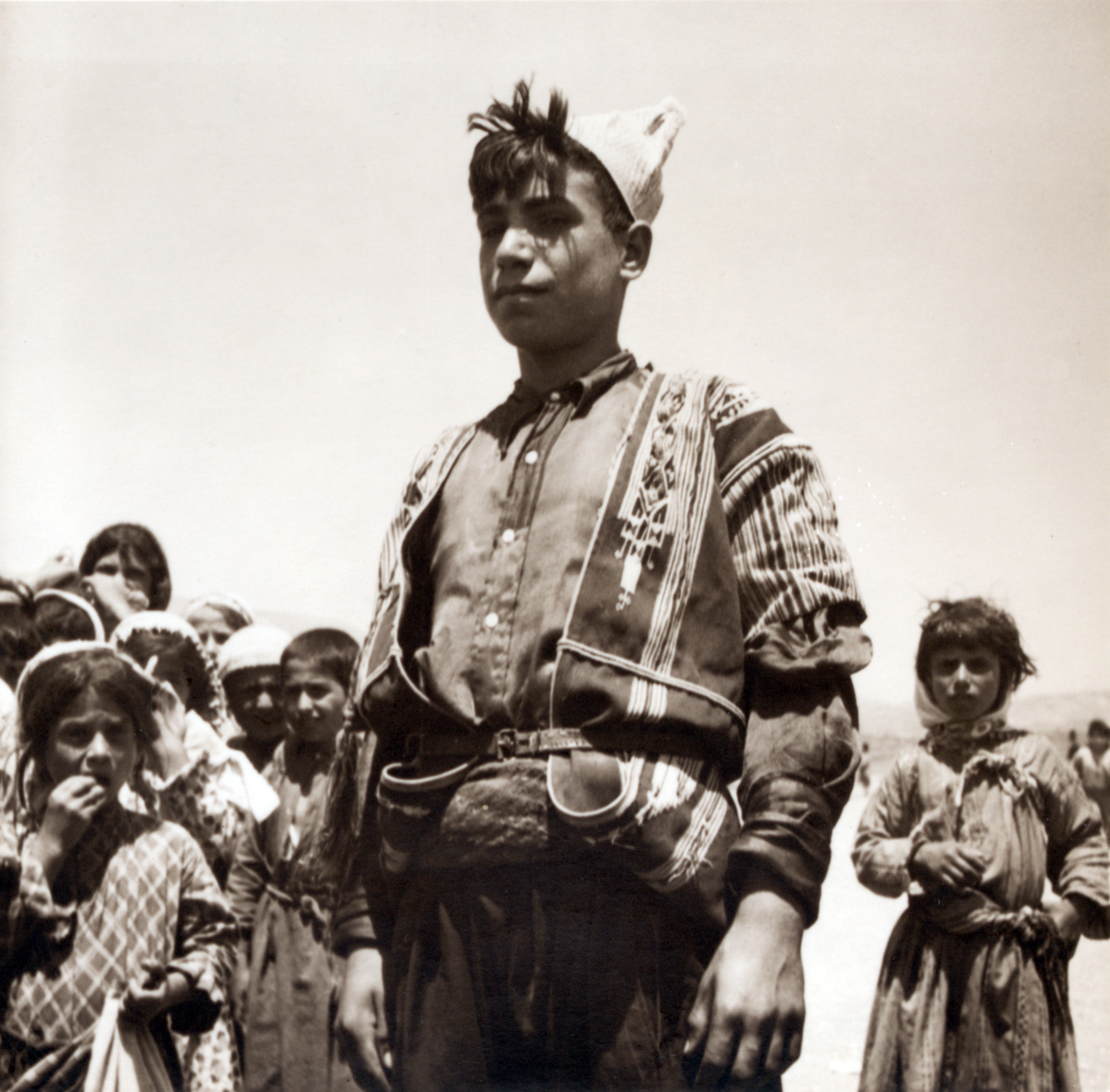
Alawite children in Antioch, 1938, later annexed by Turkey

In 1939, the Sanjak of Alexandretta (now Hatay) contained a large number of Alawites. The Hatayan land was given to Turkey by the French after a League of Nations plebiscite in the province. This development greatly angered most Syrians; to add to Alawi contempt, in 1938, the Turkish military went into İskenderun and expelled most of the Arab and Armenian population. Before this, the Alawite Arabs and Armenians comprised most of the province's population. Zaki al-Arsuzi, a young Alawite leader from Iskandarun province in the Sanjak of Alexandretta who led the resistance to the province's annexation by the Turks, later became a co-founder of the Ba'ath Party with Eastern Orthodox Christian schoolteacher Michel Aflaq and Sunni politician Salah ad-Din al-Bitar.

After World War II, Sulayman al-Murshid played a major role in uniting the Alawite province with Syria. He was executed by the Syrian government in Damascus on 12 December 1946, only three days after a political trial.

=== After Syrian independence ===
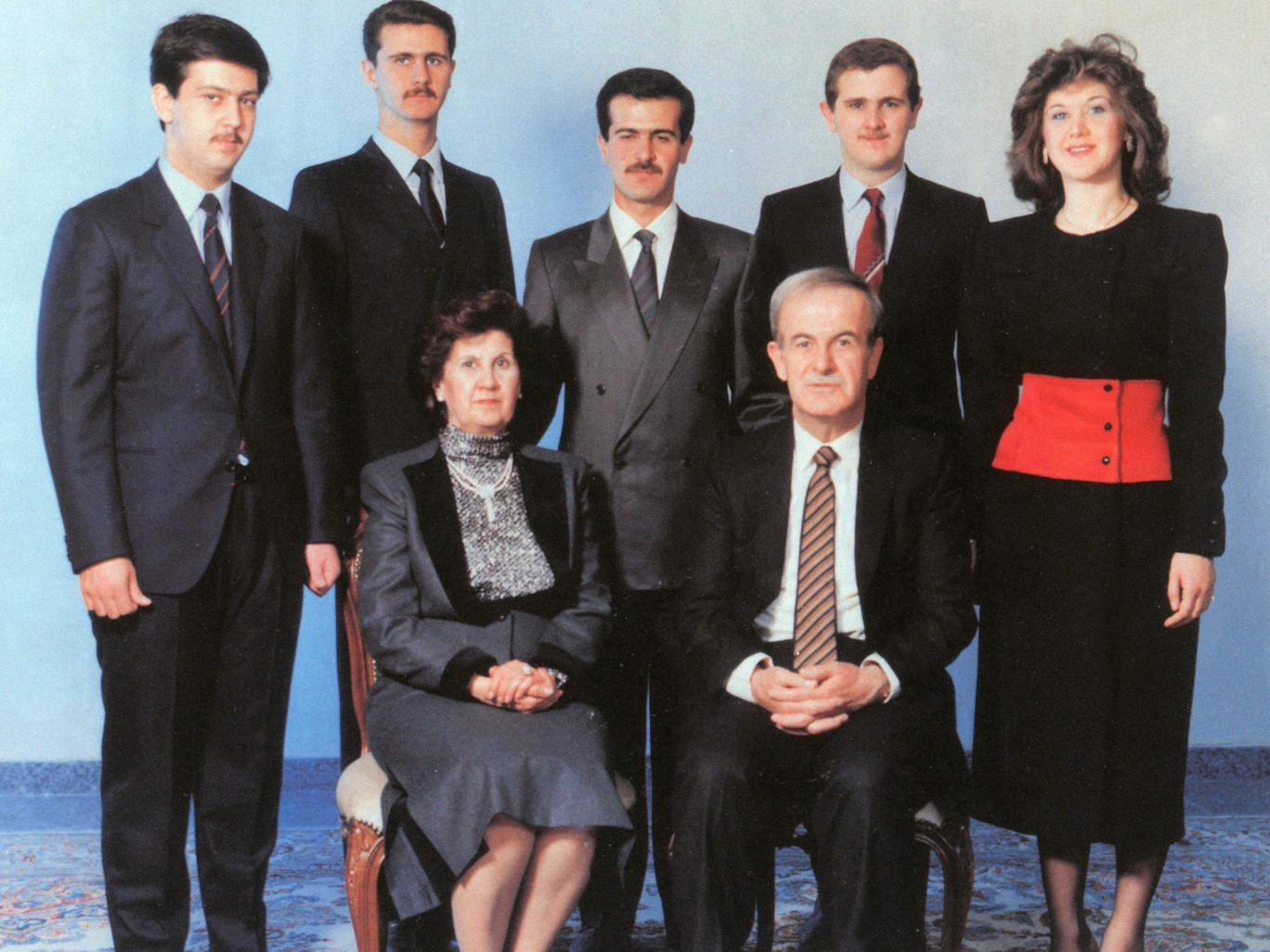
The al-Assad family

Syria became independent on 17 April 1946. In 1949, after the 1948 Arab–Israeli War, Syria experienced a number of military coups and the rise of the Ba'ath Party.

In 1958, Syria and Egypt were united by a political agreement into the United Arab Republic. The UAR lasted for three years, breaking apart in 1961, when a group of army officers seized power and declared Syria independent.

A succession of coups ensued until, in 1963, a secretive military committee (including Alawite officers Hafez al-Assad and Salah Jadid) helped the Ba'ath Party seize power. In 1966, Alawite-affiliated military officers successfully rebelled and expelled the Ba'ath Party old guard followers of Greek Orthodox Christian Michel Aflaq and Sunni Muslim Salah ad-Din al-Bitar, calling Zaki al-Arsuzi the "Socrates" of the reconstituted Ba'ath Party.

In 1970, Air Force General Hafez al-Assad, an Alawite, took power and instigated a "Corrective Movement" in the Ba'ath Party, overthrowing Salah Jadid (another Alawite). The coup ended the political instability which had existed since independence. Alawites were among Syria's poorest and most marginalized groups until Hafez al-Assad's seizure of power. Robert D. Kaplan compared his rise to "an untouchable becoming maharajah in India or a Jew becoming tsar in Russia—an unprecedented development shocking to the Sunni majority population which had monopolized power for so many centuries."

Under Hafez al-Assad and his son Bashar al-Assad, who succeeded his father upon his death in June 2000, Alawites made up the majority of Syria's military and political elites, including in the intelligence services and the shabiha (loyalist paramilitaries). The economic and social situation of Alawites improved, but the community remained relatively poor compared to other Syrians, and the Sunni-Alawite divisions persisted.

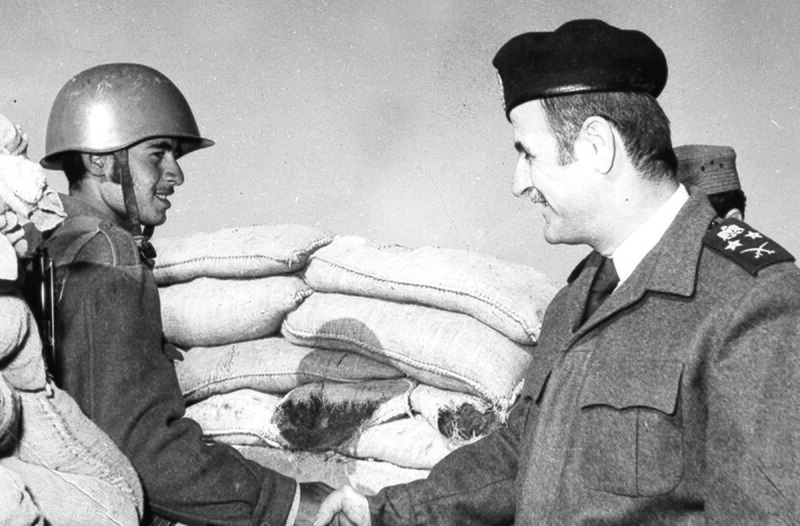
Hafez al-Assad visits the Syrian army on the Golan Heights front during the 1973 Arab-Israeli war

In 1971, al-Assad declared himself president of Syria, a position the constitution at the time permitted only for Sunni Muslims. In 1973, a new constitution was adopted, replacing Islam as the state religion with a mandate that the president's religion be Islam, and protests erupted. In 1974, to satisfy this constitutional requirement, Musa as-Sadr (a leader of the Twelvers of Lebanon and founder of the Amal Movement, who had unsuccessfully sought to unite Lebanese Alawites and Shiites under the Supreme Islamic Shiite Council) issued a fatwa that Alawites were a community of Twelver Shiite Muslims.

A significant majority of Sunni Syrians accepted Hafez al-Assad's rule, but the Muslim Brotherhood in Syria, an Islamist group, did not. In the 1970s and 1980s, the Muslim Brotherhood pushed anti-Alawite propaganda and a violent anti-Ba'athist campaign in Syria. Thirty-two cadets, mostly Alawites, were killed in the June 1979 Aleppo Artillery School massacre. In response to the Brotherhood's attempted assassination of Hafez al-Assad in 1980, the regime ordered a violent crackdown; Hafez's brother Rifaat al-Assad ordered the slaughter of hundreds of Brotherhood members at the Tadmor Prison in Palmyra.

The Brotherhood responded with increased violence, culminating in an attempt to seize control of the city of Hama in February 1982. The regime deployed between 6,000 and 8,000 troops to suppress the insurgency, and in the Hama massacre, up to 25,000 people were killed over 27 days. Seeking to ensure that troops would not turn against the government, the Assad regime was careful to ensure the dominance of Alawites in the units deployed to Hama: Rifaat al-Assad's Defense Companies were reported to be 90% Alawite, and in other units, up to 70% of officers corps were Alawites. After 1982, Syria remained relatively stable until the outbreak of the Syrian civil war in 2011, but the events in Hama left enduring Sunni-Alawite sectarian resentments.

=== Syrian civil war ===
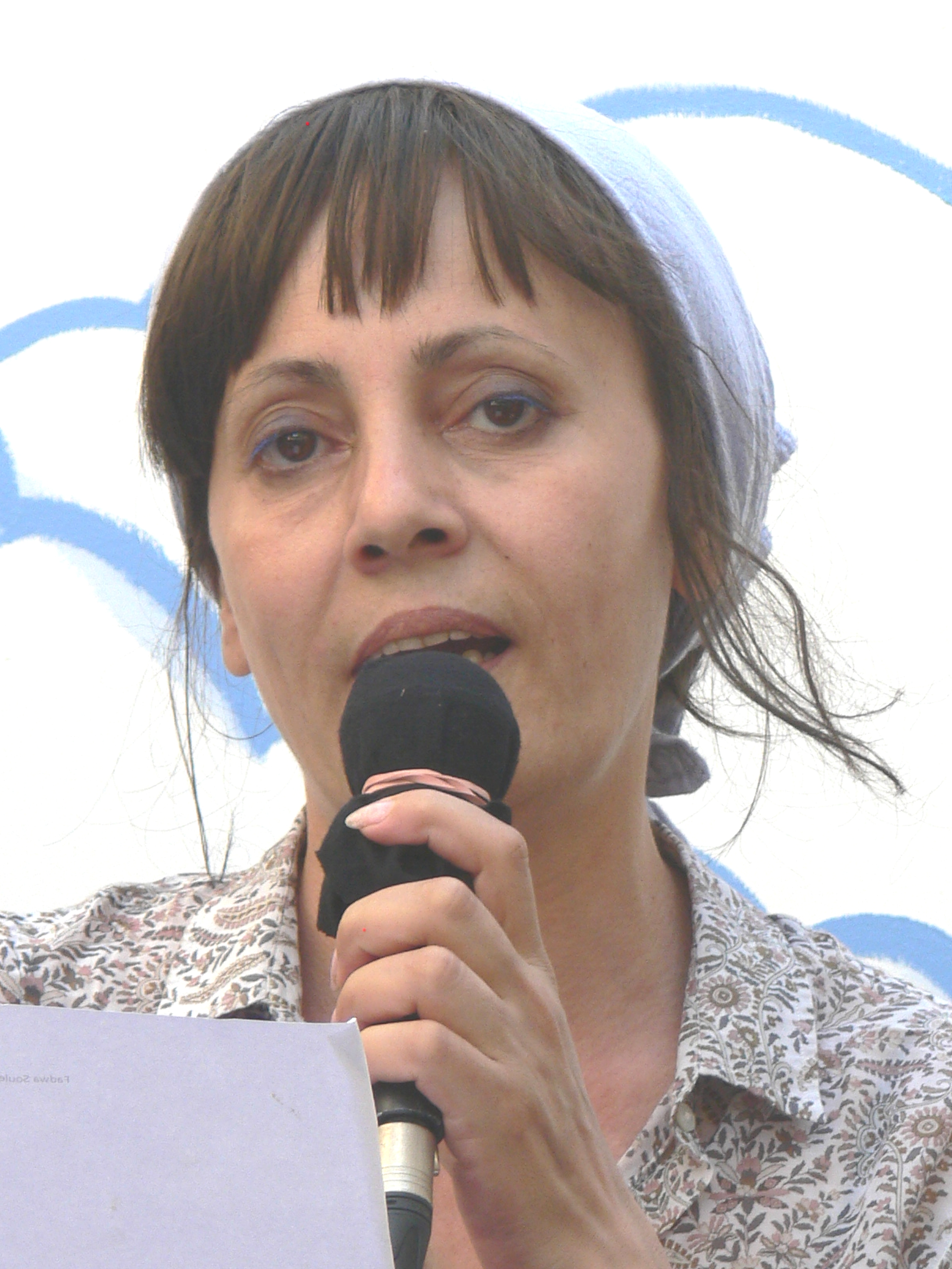
Syrian actress Fadwa Souleimane became one of the most recognized faces of the Syrian Revolution.

After the Syrian civil war broke out in 2011, the Ba'athist state conscripted able-bodied men, mostly youth, into the regime's military. Fearing mass defections in military ranks, the Assad regime preferred to send Alawite recruits for active combat on the frontlines, and conscriptions disproportionately targeted Alawite regions. This has resulted in a large number of Alawite casualties and immense suffering to Alawite villages along the Syrian coast.

Many younger Alawites were greatly angered by the Assad government, held the government responsible for the crisis, and increasingly called for an end to the conflict via reconciliation with the Syrian opposition and preventing their community from being perceived as being associated with the Assad government.

In the early days of the Syrian civil war, many Alawites felt compelled to back Assad, fearing that a rebel victory would lead to a slaughter of the Alawite community, especially as the conflict took on an increasingly sectarian cast. In May 2013, pro-opposition SOHR stated that out of 94,000 Syrian regime soldiers killed during the war, at least 41,000 were Alawites. Reports estimate that up to a third of 250,000 young Alawite men of fighting age has been killed in the war by 2015, due to being disproportionately sent to fight in the frontlines by the Assad government. In April 2017, a pro-opposition source claimed 150,000 young Alawites had died. Another report estimates that around 100,000 Alawite youths were killed in combat by 2020.

Many Alawites feared significant danger during the Syrian civil war, particularly from Islamic groups who were a part of the opposition, though denied by secular opposition factions. Alawites have also been wary of the increased Iranian influence in Syria since the Syrian civil war, viewing it as a threat to their long-term survival due to Khomeinist conversion campaigns focused in Alawite coastal regions. Many Alawites, including Assad loyalists, criticize such activities as a plot to absorb their ethno-religious identity into Iran's Twelver Shia umbrella and spread religious extremism in Syria.

Alawite villages and neighborhoods were targeted by Islamist rebel attacks during the war. These include the Aqrab, Maan and Adra massacres, the 2013 Latakia offensive, the Homs school bombing, the Zara'a attack, and the February 2016 Homs bombings.

While many Alawites were Assad loyalists throughout the civil war, the Baathist regime faced increasing discontent in the war's later years from Alawite-dominated areas. By 2023, some Alawites had criticized the regime for its corruption, economic mismanagement, and disregard for civil liberties. During a rapid offence in November and December 2024 by opposition forces fighting the Assad regime, thousands of Alawites fled the city of Homs ahead of the capture of the city; those who left headed to coastal Tartus Governorate. Upon the fall of Damascus and collapse of the Assad regime days later, Alawite communities continued to express uncertainty about their future, although fears receded somewhat because the opposition forces did not target Alawites after capturing Homs.

==== Alleged attempt to establish an Alawite state ====
According to the UK-based war monitor Syrian Observatory for Human Rights (SOHR), former Syrian President Bashar al-Assad sought to establish an Alawite state on the Syrian coast as a fallback plan. This proposed coastal statelet was reportedly intended to serve as a stronghold for his regime in the event of losing control over the rest of the country.

Russia, a key ally of Assad, allegedly rejected this plan, viewing it as an attempt to divide Syria. The SOHR claimed that Assad subsequently fled to Russia on his plane after facing opposition to the proposal and refused to deliver a speech about stepping down from power. There were also reports claiming that Assad had been relying heavily on Iran's support to maintain his position.

=== Post-Assad Syria ===
January 2025: Turkish Alawite politician Tülay Hatimoğulları gives a speech about anti-Alawite violence in Syria at the Shrine of Khidr.

On 25 December 2024, thousands of people protested across Syria in various regions including Latakia, Tartus, Jableh and Homs after a video surfaced showing an attack on the Alawite shrine of Al-Khasibi in Aleppo's Maysaloon district following the rebel offensive and the fall of the regime of Bashar al-Assad. During the shrine attack at least five people were killed and the shrine was set ablaze. The UK-based SOHR reported significant demonstrations, including in Qardaha, President Assad's hometown.

The transitional authorities, appointed by Hay'at Tahrir al-Sham (HTS) which led the offensive that toppled Assad, said in a statement that the shrine attack was from earlier December, attributing its resurfacing to "unknown groups" aiming to incite unrest. This incident followed protests in Damascus against the burning of a Christmas tree, highlighting ongoing sectarian tensions in Syria. Demonstrators chanting slogans including "Alawite, Sunni, we want peace" and placards with "No to burning holy places and religious discrimination, no to sectarianism, yes to a free Syria".

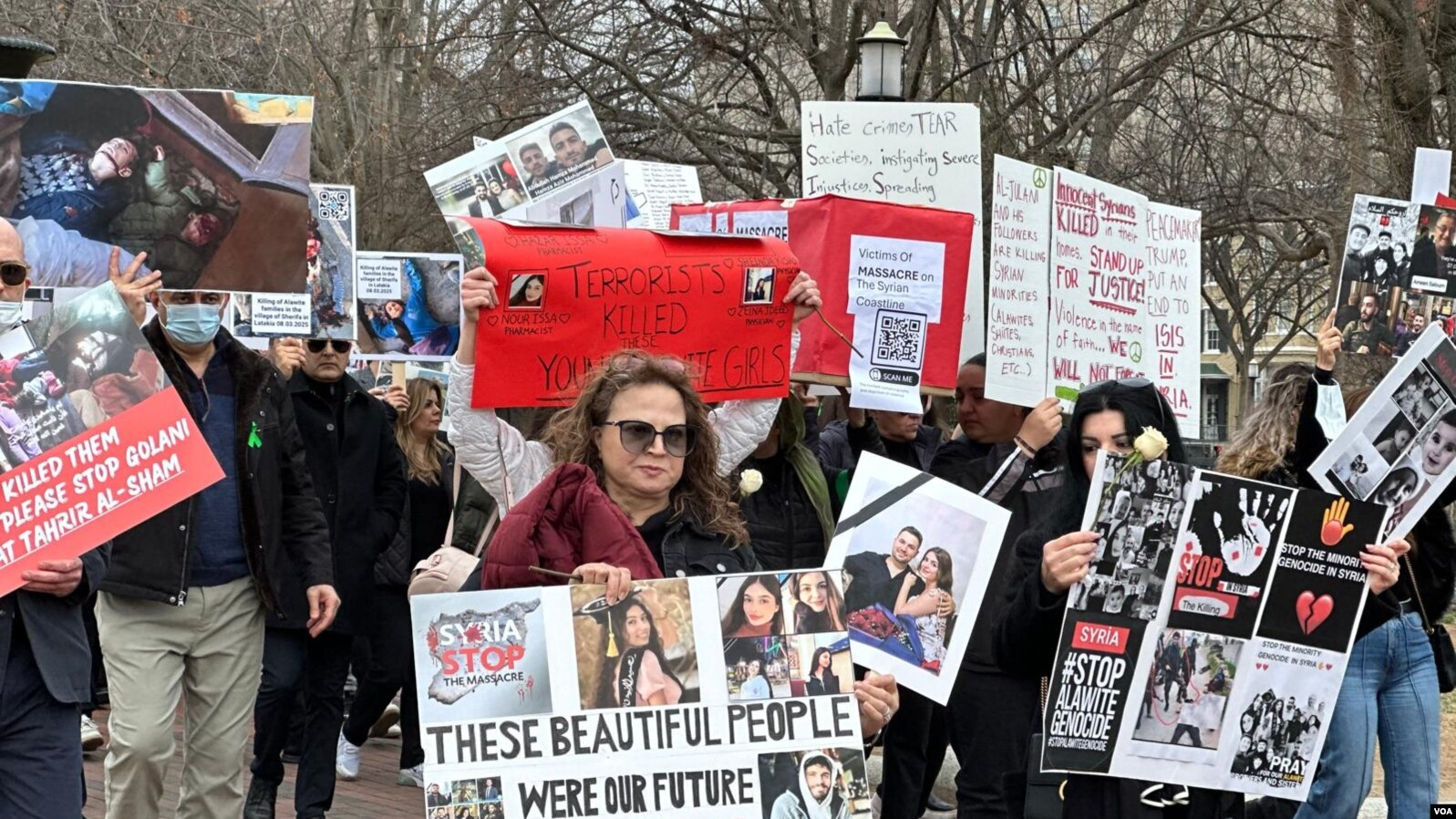
Protests against the massacres of Alawites in Washington, D.C., 2025

There have also been hundreds of reports across Syria of civilians belonging to the Alawite sect and other religious minorities being murdered and persecuted by HTS forces following the collapse of the Assad regime. Most notably, a massacre of Alawites was reported in the village of Fahil near Homs by HTS-affiliated gunmen. The UK-based formerly pro-opposition monitor SOHR confirmed the deaths of at least 16 people.

In March 2025, the UK-based SOHR reported that Syrian security forces and pro-government fighters had committed a massacre of more than 1,500 Alawite civilians during clashes in western Syria. There were reports that Alawites who had opposed the Assad regime in the past were murdered in sectarian attacks. Belteleradio described the violence as ethnic cleansing. Syrian President Ahmed al-Sharaa said that the Alawite sect had made an "unforgivable mistake" and urged them to lay down their weapons and surrender before it was too late. Later that month, nearly 13,000 Alawites crossed the Nahr al-Kabir into Lebanon to escape sectarian violence.

== Beliefs ==
Statue of Ali with lions in the Alawite village of Ghajar

Alawites and their beliefs have been described as secretive. Yaron Friedman has noted in his scholarly work on the group that the Alawi religious material he cited came solely from "public libraries and printed books," as their "sacred writings" are kept secret. (Note: Since the sacred writings of the Nuṣayrī-ʿAlawīs are kept secret by the members of the sect because of their sensitivity, the religious material used in this volume is only that which is accessible in public libraries and printed books.) (Note: According to Alawite beliefs, women are not permitted to engage in religious studies.) Some of the components of the faith are kept hidden from all but a sect group of Alawites. They have, therefore, been described as a mystical sect.

Alawite doctrines originated from the teachings of Iraqi priest Muhammad ibn Nusayr, who claimed prophethood, declared himself as the "Bāb (Door) of the Imams", and attributed divinity to Hasan al-Askari. Al-Askari denounced Ibn Nusayr, and Islamic authorities expelled his disciples—most of whom emigrated to the Syrian Coastal Mountain Range, wherein they established a distinct community. Nusayri theology treats Ali, the cousin of the Islamic prophet Muhammad, as a manifestation of "the supreme eternal God" and consists of various gnostic beliefs. Alawite doctrine regards the souls of Alawites as reincarnations of "lights that rebelled against God."

Alawites' beliefs have never been confirmed by their modern religious authorities. As a highly secretive and esoteric sect, Nusayri priests tend to conceal their core doctrines, which are introduced only to a chosen minority of the sect's adherents. Alawites have also adopted the practice of taqiya to avoid victimization.

According to Peter Theo Curtis, the Alawi religion underwent a process of "Sunnification" during the years under Hafez al-Assad's rule so that Alawites became not Shia but effectively Sunni. Public manifestations or "even mentioning of any Alawite religious activities" were banned, as were any Alawite religious organizations, and "any formation of a unified religious council" or a higher Alawite religious authority. "Sunni-style" mosques were built in every Alawite village, and Alawis were encouraged to perform Hajj.

=== Theology and practices ===
Alawites celebrating at a festival in Banyas, Syria, WWII

Alawite doctrine incorporates elements of Phoenician mythology, Gnosticism, neo-Platonism, Christian Trinitarianism (for example, they celebrate Mass including the consecration of bread and wine); blending them with Muslim symbolism and has, therefore, been described as syncretic.

Alawite Trinity envisions God as being composed of three distinct manifestations, Ma'na (meaning), Ism (Name), and Bab (Door), which together constitute an "indivisible Trinity". Ma'na symbolises the "source and meaning of all things" in Alawite mythology. According to Alawite doctrines, Ma'na generated the Ism, which in turn built the Bab. These beliefs are closely tied to the Nusayri doctrine of reincarnations of the Trinity.

The Oxford Encyclopedia of the Modern Islamic World classifies Alawites as the only remaining part of the divergent ghulat religious movements; owing to the secretive nature of the Alawite religious system and hierarchy. Due to their esoteric doctrines of strict secrecy, conversions into the community is also forbidden.

Alawites do not believe in daily Muslim prayers (salah). The central tenet of the Alawite is their belief of Ali ibn Abi Talib being an incarnation of God. The Alawite testimony of faith is translated as "There is no God but Ali."

==== Reincarnation ====
A logo featuring the names Ali, Muhammad, and Salman each repeated three times interlocked in the shape of a flower; the design reflects a core tenet of the Alawite faith.

Alawites hold that they were originally stars or divine lights that were cast out of heaven through disobedience and must undergo repeated reincarnation (or metempsychosis) before returning to heaven. According to Alawite beliefs, females are excluded from reincarnation.

Alawite theologians divided history into seven eras, associating each era with one of the seven reincarnations of the Alawite Trinity (Ma'na, Ism, Bab). The seven reincarnations of the Trinity in the Alawite faith can be summarized in the following table.

The seven eras in Alawite theology
Era	Ma'na (Meaning)	Ism (Name)	Bab (Gate)
1	Abel	Adam	Gabriel
2	Seth	Noah	Yail ibn Fatin
3	Joseph	Jacob	Ham ibn Kush
4	Joshua	Moses	Dan ibn Usbaut
5	Asaph	Solomon	Abd Allah ibn Siman
6	Simon Peter	Jesus	Rawzaba ibn al-Marzuban
7	Ali	Muhammad	Salman al-Farisi

The last triad of reincarnations in the Nusayri Trinity consists of Ali (Ma'na), Muhammad (Ism), and Salman al-Farsi (Bab). Alawites depict them as the sky, the sun, and the moon, respectively. They deify Ali as the "last and supreme manifestation of God" who built the universe, attributing to him divine superiority and believing that Ali created Muhammad, bestowing upon him the mission to spread Qur'anic teachings on earth.

==== Other beliefs ====
Statue of Saint George, who is identified with Khidr, in Ghajar

Other beliefs and practices include: the consecration of wine in a secret form of Mass performed only by males; frequently being given Christian names; observing Epiphany, Christmas and the feast days of John Chrysostom and Mary Magdalene; the only religious structures they have are the shrines of tombs; the book Kitab al-Majmu, which is allegedly a central source of Alawite doctrine, where they have their own trinity, comprising Mohammed, Ali, and Salman the Persian.

In addition, they celebrate different holidays such as Old New Year, (Note: The Old New Year is celebrated on 13 January, and named as Gawzela Day (يوم القوزلة), as it means "Igniting the Fire" in Syriac language.) Akitu, (Note: The festival is celebrated on 17 April according to the Julian calendar, which is based on 4 April in the Gregorian calendar.) Eid al-Ghadir, Mid-Sha'ban and Eid il-Burbara. They believe in intercession of certain legendary saints such as Khidr (Saint George) and Simeon Stylites.

==== Development ====
Yaron Friedman and many researchers of Alawi doctrine write that the founder of the religion, Ibn Nusayr, did not necessarily believe he was representative of a splinter, rebel group of the Shias, but believed he held the true doctrine of the Shias and most of the aspects that are similar to Christianity are considered more a coincidence and not a direct influence from it, as well as other external doctrines that were popular among Shia esoteric groups in Basra in the 8th century. According to Friedman and other scholars, the Alawi movement started as many other mystical ghulat sects with an explicit concentration on an allegorical and esoteric meaning of the Quran and other mystical practices, and not as a pure syncretic sect, though later, they embraced some other practices, as they believed all religions had the same Batin core.

Alawite notables during the French Mandate, 1921

Journalist Robert F. Worth argues that the idea that the Alawi religion is a branch of Islam is a rewriting of history made necessary by the French colonialists' abandonment of the Alawi and departure from Syria. Worth describes the "first ... authentic source for outsiders about the religion", written by Soleyman of Adana – a 19th-century Alawi convert to Christianity who broke his oath of secrecy on the religion, explaining that the Alawi, according to Soleyman, deified Ali, venerated Christ, Muhammad, Plato, Socrates, and Aristotle, and held themselves apart from Muslims and Christians, whom they considered heretics. According to Tom Heneghan:

Alawite religion is often called "an offshoot of Shi'ism," Islam's largest minority sect, but that is something like referring to Christianity as "an offshoot of Judaism." Alawites broke away from Shi'ism over 1,000 years ago.

According to a disputed letter, in 1936, six Alawi notables petitioned the French colonialists not to merge their Alawi enclave with the rest of Syria, insisting that "the spirit of hatred and fanaticism embedded in the hearts of the Arab Muslims against everything that is non-Muslim has been perpetually nurtured by the Islamic religion." However, according to associate professor Stefan Winter, this letter is a forgery. According to Worth, later fatwas declaring Alawi to be part of the Shia community were by Shia clerics "eager for Syrian patronage" from Syria's Alawi president Hafez al-Assad, who was eager for Islamic legitimacy in the face of the hostility of Syria's Muslim majority.

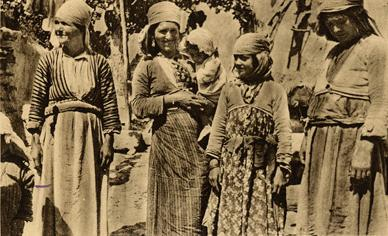
Alawite women in Syria, early 20th century

Yaron Friedman does not suggest that Alawi did not consider themselves Muslims, but does state that:

The modern period has witnessed tremendous changes in the definition of the ʿAlawīs and the attitude towards them in the Muslim world. ... In order to end their long isolation, the name of the sect was changed in the 1920s from Nusạyriyya to ʿAlawiyya'. By taking this step, leaders of the sect expressed not only their link to Shīʿism, but to Islam in general.

According to Peter Theo Curtis, the Alawi religion underwent a process of "Sunnification" during the years under Hafez al-Assad's rule so that Alawites became not Shia but effectively Sunni. Public manifestations or "even mentioning of any Alawite religious activities" were banned, as were any Alawite religious organizations, and "any formation of a unified religious council" or a higher Alawite religious authority. "Sunni-style" mosques were built in every Alawite village, and Alawis were encouraged to perform Hajj. It's also worth noting that the grand mosque in Qardaha, the hometown of the Assad family, is dedicated to Abu Bakr Al-Siddiq who is venerated by Sunnis but not Shi'ites.

== Opinions on position within Islam ==
The Sunni Grand Mufti of Jerusalem, Haj Amin al-Husseini, issued a fatwa recognizing them as part of the Muslim community in the interest of Arab nationalism. However, classical Sunni scholars such as the Syrian historian Ibn Kathir categorized Alawites as non-Muslim and mushrikeen (polytheists), in their writings. Ibn Taymiyya, Ibn Kathir's mentor and arguably the most polemical anti-Alawite Sunni theologian, categorised Alawite as non-Muslims and listed them amongst the worst sects of polytheists.

Through many of his fatwas, Ibn Taymiyya described Alawites as "the worst enemies of the Muslims" who were far more dangerous than Crusaders and Mongols. Ibn Taymiyya also accused Alawites of aiding the Crusades and Mongol invasions against the Muslim world. Other Sunni scholars, such as Al-Ghazali, likewise considered them non-Muslims. Benjamin Disraeli, in his novel Tancred, also expressed the view that Alawites are not Shia Muslims.

Historically, Twelver Shia scholars, such as Shaykh Tusi, did not consider Alawites Shia Muslims and condemned their heretical beliefs.

In 2016, according to several international media reports, an unspecified number of Alawite community leaders released a "Declaration of an Alawite Identity Reform" (of the Alawite community). The manifesto presents Alawism as a current "within Islam" and rejects attempts to incorporate the Alawite community into Twelver Shiism. The document was interpreted as an attempt by representatives of the Alawite community to overcome the sectarian polarisation and to distance themselves from the growing Sunni–Shia divide in the Middle East.

According to Matti Moosa,

The Christian elements in the Nusayri religion are unmistakable. They include the concept of trinity; the celebration of Christmas, the consecration of the Qurbana, that is, the sacrament of the flesh and blood which Christ offered to his disciples, and, most importantly, the celebration of the Quddas (a lengthy prayer proclaiming the divine attributes of Ali and the personification of all the biblical patriarchs from Adam to Simon Peter, founder of the Church, who is seen, paradoxically, as the embodiment of true Islam).

Barry Rubin has suggested that Syrian leader Hafez al-Assad and his son and successor Bashar al-Assad pressed their fellow Alawites "to behave like 'regular Muslims', shedding (or at least concealing) their distinctive aspects". During the early 1970s, a booklet, al-'Alawiyyun Shi'atu Ahl al-Bait ("The Alawites are Followers of the Household of the Prophet") was published, which was "signed by numerous 'Alawi' men of religion", described the doctrines of the Imami Shia as Alawite.

The relationship between Alawite-ruled Ba'athist Syria and Khomeinist Iran has been described as a "marriage of convenience" due to the former being ruled by the ultra-secularist Arab Socialist Ba'ath party and the latter by the anti-secular Twelver Shi'ite clergy. The alliance was established during the Iran–Iraq War in the 1980s, when Hafez al-Assad backed Iran against his Iraqi Ba'athist rivals, departing from the consensus of the rest of the Arab world. Iranian-backed militant groups like Hezbollah, Liwa Fatemiyoun, and Liwa Zainabiyoun have acted as proxy forces for the Assad regime in the Syrian civil war.

Some sources have discussed the "Sunnification" of Alawites under the al-Assad regime. Joshua Landis, director of the Center for Middle East Studies, writes that Hafiz al-Assad "tried to turn Alawites into 'good' (read Sunnified) Muslims in exchange for preserving a modicum of secularism and tolerance in society". On the other hand, Al-Assad "declared the Alawites to be nothing but Twelver Shiites". In a paper, "Islamic Education in Syria", Landis wrote that "no mention" is made in Syrian textbooks (controlled by the Al-Assad regime) of Alawites, Druze, Ismailis or Shia Islam; Islam was presented as a monolithic religion.

Ali Sulayman al-Ahmad, chief judge of the Ba'athist Syrian state, has said:

We are Alawi Muslims. Our book is the Qur'an. Our prophet is Muhammad. The Ka`ba is our qibla, and our Dīn (religion) is Islam.

== Population ==
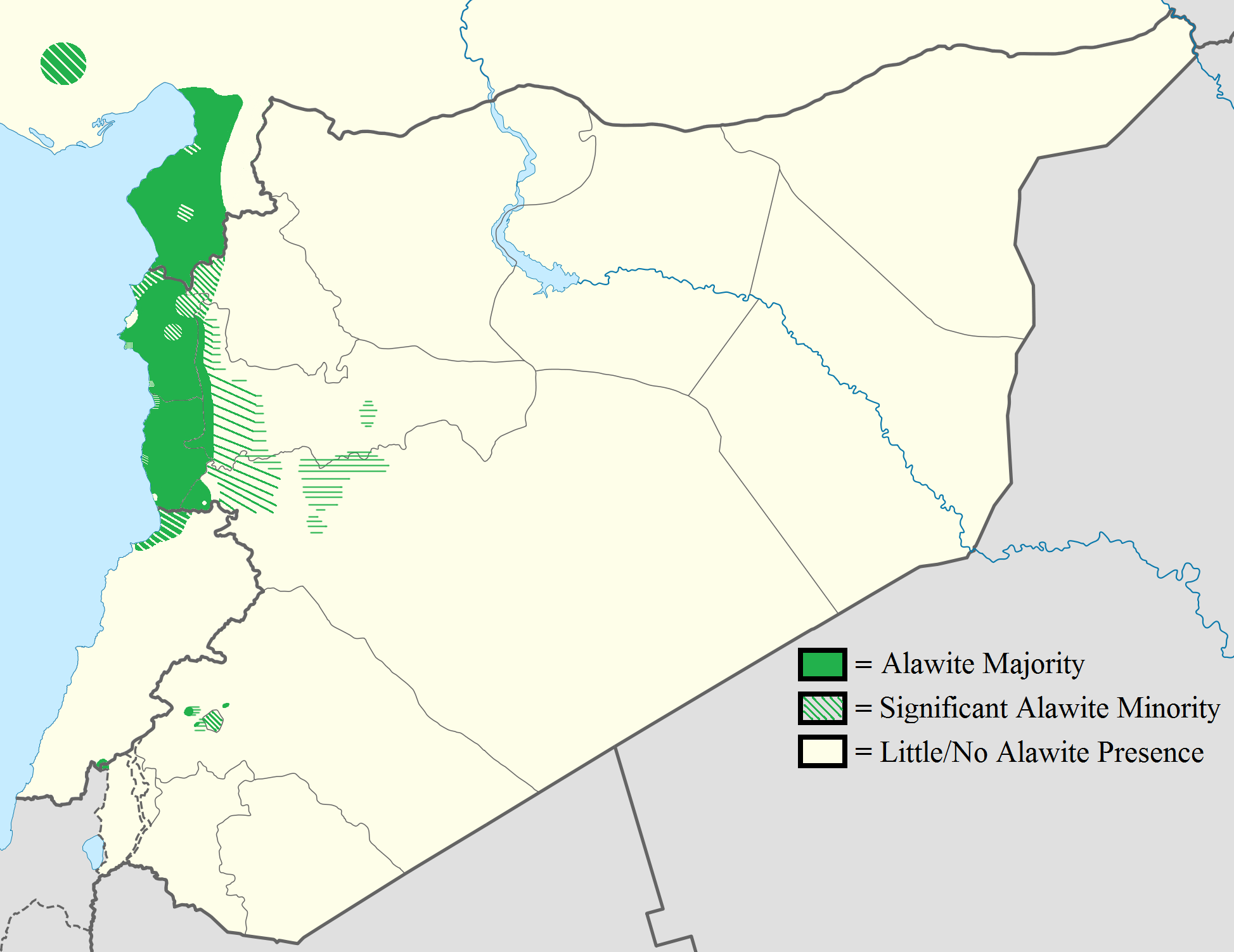
A 2012 map showing the distribution of Alawites in the Northern Levant.

=== Syria ===
Alawites have traditionally lived in the Coastal Mountain Range, along the Mediterranean coast of western Syria. Latakia and Tartus are the region's principal cities. They are also concentrated in the plains around Hama and Homs. Alawites also live in Syria's major cities. They make up about 9 to 12% of the country's population.

There are four Alawite confederations—Kalbiyya, Khaiyatin, Haddadin, and Matawirah—each divided into tribes based on their geographical origins or their main religious leader, such as Ḥaidarīya of Alī Ḥaidar, and Kalāziyya of Sheikh Muḥammad ibn Yūnus from the village Kalāzū near Antakya. Those Alawites are concentrated in the Latakia region of Syria, extending north to Antioch (Antakya), Turkey, and in and around Homs and Hama.

Before 1953, Alawites held specifically reserved seats in the Syrian Parliament, in common with all other religious communities. After that (including the 1960 census), there were only general Muslim and Christian categories, without mention of subgroups, to reduce sectarianism (taifiyya).

==== Golan Heights ====
Ghajar seen from the Sheba'a Farms

Before the 1967 war, Alawites in the Golan Heights lived mainly in three northern villages, 'Ayn Fit, Za'ura and Ghajar. There are about 3,900 Alawites living in the village of Ghajar, which is located on the border between Lebanon and the Israeli-occupied Golan Heights. In 1932, the residents of Ghajar were given the option of choosing their nationality, and overwhelmingly chose to be a part of Syria, which has a sizable Alawite minority. Before the 1967 Arab-Israeli War, the residents of Ghajar were counted in the 1960 Syrian census. According to Joshua Project, after Israel captured the Golan Heights from Syria, and after implementing Israeli civil law in 1981, the Alawite community chose to become Israeli citizens. However, according to Al-Marsad, Alawites were forced to undergo a process of naturalisation.

=== Turkey ===
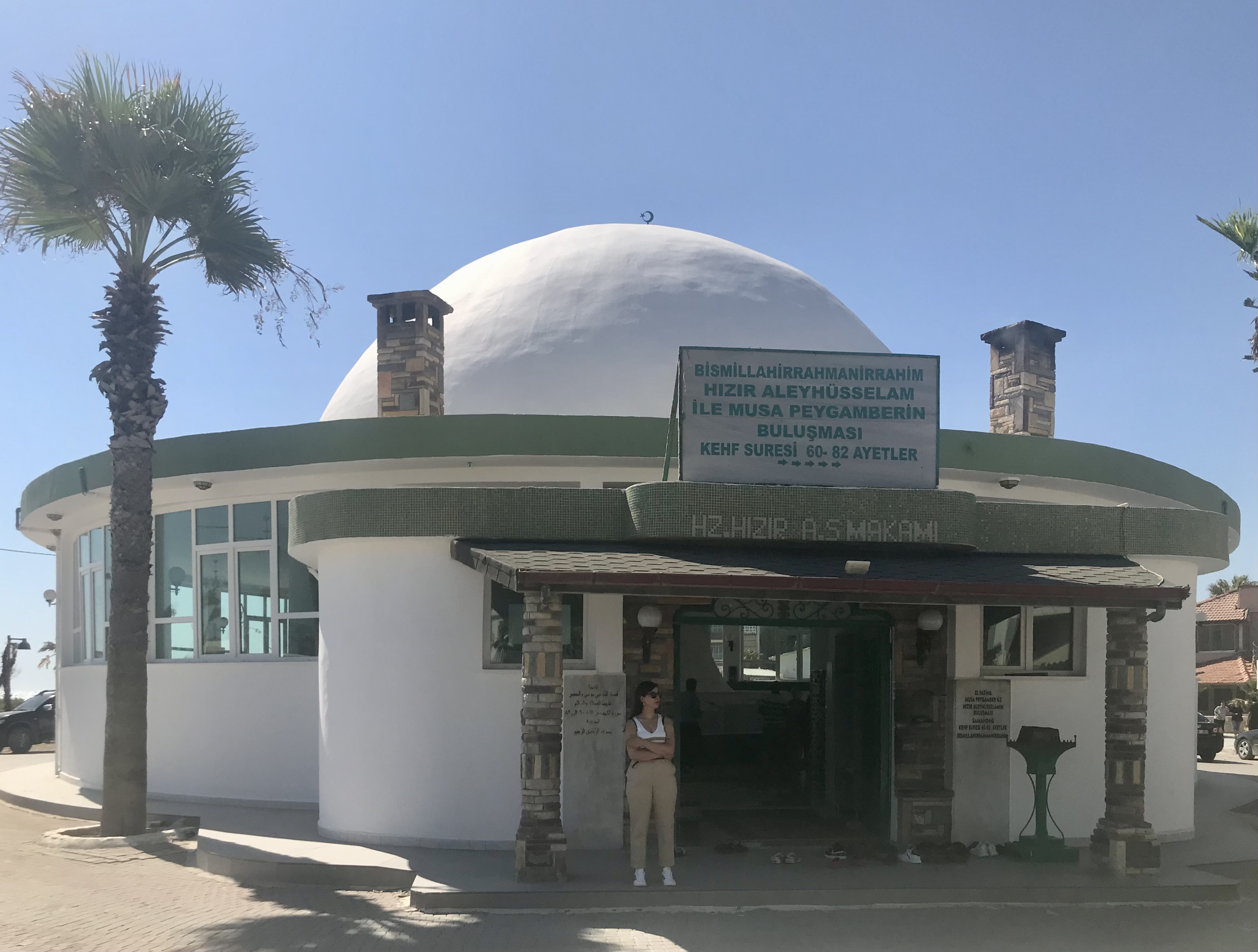
The Shrine of Khidr, located near the Syria-Turkey border, is a notable Alawite shrine frequently visited by people from multiple cities.

To avoid confusion with the ethnic Turkish and Kurdish Alevis, the Alawites call themselves Arap Alevileri ("Arab Alevis") in Turkish. The term Nusayrī, previously used in theological texts, has been revived in recent studies. A quasi-official name used during the 1930s by Turkish authorities was Eti Türkleri ("Hittite Turks"), to deny their Arabic origins.

In 1939, the Alawites accounted for some 40 percent of the population of the province of İskenderun. According to French geographer Fabrice Balanche, relations between the Alawites of Turkey and the Alawites of Syria are limited. Community ties were broken by the Turkification policy and the decades-long closure of the Syria-Turkey border.

The exact number of Alawites in Turkey is unknown; there were 185,000 in 1970. As Muslims, they are not recorded separately from Sunnis. In the 1965 census (the last Turkish census where informants were asked about their mother tongue), 185,000 people in the three provinces declared their mother tongue as Arabic; however, Arabic-speaking Sunnis and Christians were also included in this figure. Turkish Alawites traditionally speak the same dialect of Levantine Arabic as Syrian Alawites. Arabic is preserved in rural communities and in Samandağ. Younger people in the cities of Çukurova and İskenderun tend to speak Turkish. The Turkish spoken by Alawites is distinguished by its accents and vocabulary. Knowledge of the Arabic alphabet is confined to religious leaders and men who have worked or studied in Arab countries.

Alawites demonstrate considerable social mobility. Until the 1960s, they were bound to Sunni aghas (landholders) around Antakya and were poor. Alawites are prominent in the sectors of transportation and commerce and a large, professional middle class has emerged. Male exogamy has increased, particularly among those who attend universities or live in other parts of Turkey. These marriages are tolerated; however, female exogamy (as in other patrilineal groups) is discouraged.

Alawites, like Alevis, have strong leftist political beliefs. However, some people in rural areas (usually members of notable Alawite families) may support secular, conservative parties such as the Democrat Party. Most Alawites feel oppressed by the policies of the Presidency of Religious Affairs in Turkey (Diyanet İşleri Başkanlığı).

There are religious festivals celebrated by Alawites in Turkey that have origins in the pre-Islamic periods, such as the Evvel Temmuz Festival.

=== Lebanon ===
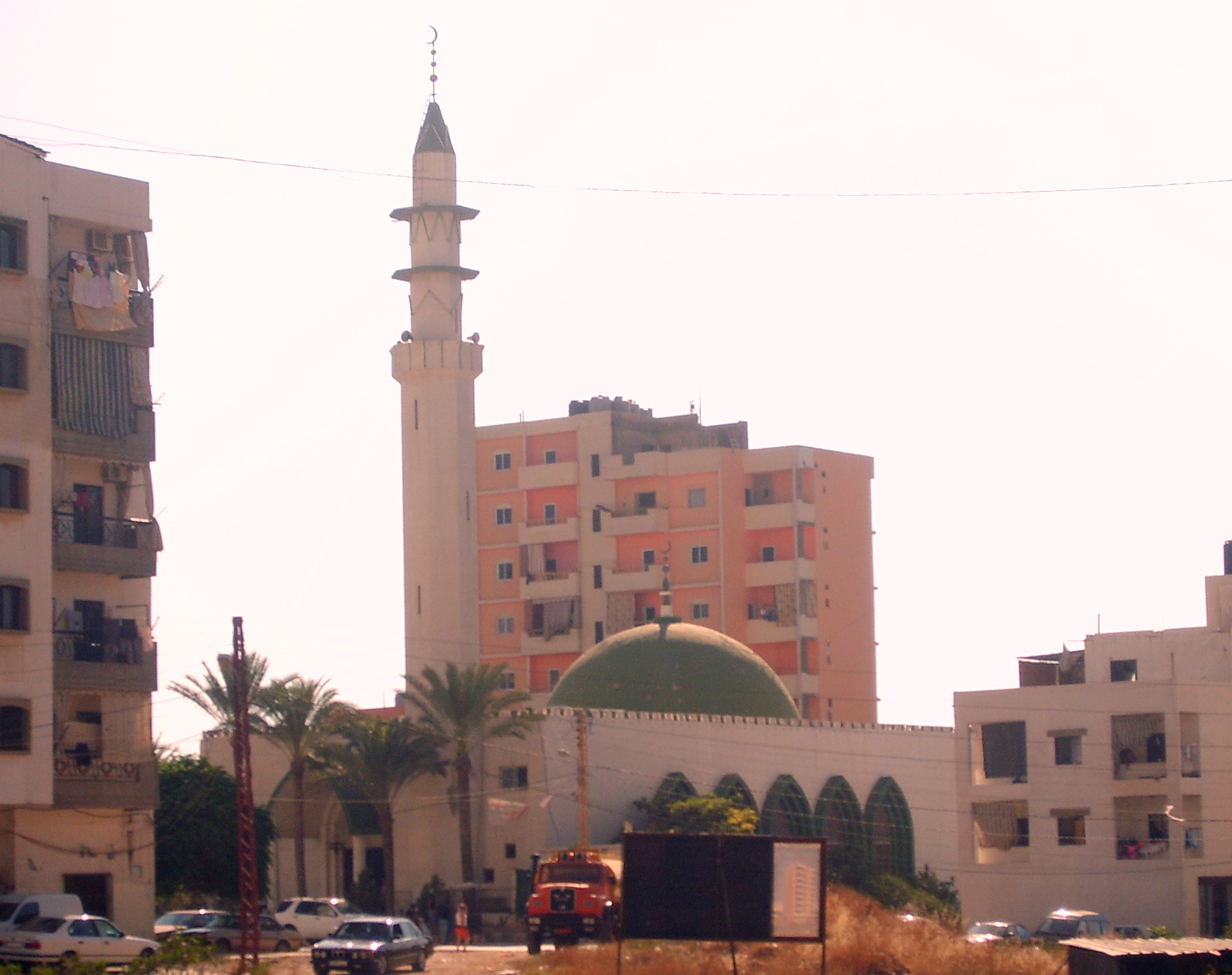
The Alawite Imam Ali Mosque in Jabal Mohsen, Tripoli, Lebanon

In 2011, there were an estimated 150,000 Alawites in Lebanon, where they have lived since at least the 16th century. They are one of the 18 official Lebanese sects; due to the efforts of their leader, Ali Eid, the Taif Agreement of 1989 gave them two reserved seats in Parliament. Lebanese Alawites live primarily in the Jabal Mohsen neighbourhood of Tripoli and in 10 villages in the Akkar District, and are represented by the Arab Democratic Party. Their Mufti was Sheikh Assad Assi, but he died in 2017. Sheikh Ali Qaddour has been the head of the Islamic Alawite Council in Lebanon since 2023. The Bab al-Tabbaneh–Jabal Mohsen conflict between pro-Syrian Alawites and anti-Syrian Sunnis has affected Tripoli for decades.

== Language ==
Alawites in Syria speak a special dialect (part of Levantine Arabic) famous for the usage of letter (qāf), but this feature is shared with neighbouring non-Alawite villages, such as Idlib. Due to foreign occupation of Syria, the same dialect is characterized by multiple borrowings, mainly from Turkish and then French, especially terms used for imported inventions such as television, radio, elevator (ascenseur), etc.

== See also ==
- List of Alawites
- Islam in Syria

== Sources ==
- Bar-Asher, Meir M. (2003). "NOṢAYRIS". Encyclopaedia Iranica.
- Bar-Asher, Meir M.; Kofsky, Aryeh (2002). The Nusayrī-ʿAlawī Religion: An Enquiry into its Theology and Liturgy. Leiden: Brill. doi:10.1163/9789004453500. ISBN 978-90-04-12552-0.
- Friedman, Yaron (2000–2010). "Moḥammad b. Noṣayr". In Yarshater, Ehsan (ed.). Encyclopædia Iranica.
- Friedman, Yaron (2010). The Nuṣayrī-ʿAlawīs : An Introduction to the Religion, History and Identity of the Leading Minority in Syria (PDF). Islamic History and Civilization. Vol. 77. Leiden, Boston: Brill. doi:10.1163/ej.9789004178922.i-328. ISBN 978-90-04-178922.
- Halm, Heinz (2001–2012). "Ḡolāt". In Yarshater, Ehsan (ed.). Encyclopædia Iranica.
- Steigerwald, Diana (2010). "Ibn Nuṣayr". In Fleet, Kate; Krämer, Gudrun; Matringe, Denis; Nawas, John; Rowson, Everett (eds.). Encyclopaedia of Islam, Three. doi:10.1163/1573-3912_ei3_COM_23483.
- Worth, Robert F. (2016). A Rage for Order: The Middle East in Turmoil, from Tahrir Square to ISIS. Pan Macmillan. p. 82. ISBN 9780374710712.
- Winter, Stefan (2016). A History of the 'Alawis: From Medieval Aleppo to the Turkish Republic. Princeton and Oxford: Princeton University Press. ISBN 9780691173894.
