= Massacre of the Telal =

1517 massacre

Telal massacre
- Location: Ottoman Syria
- Date: 1517
- Target: Alawis and Shiites
- Deaths: 9,400
- Perpetrators: Ottoman Empire and Sunnis
- Motive: Anti-Alawism; Anti-Shi'ism

Massacre of the Telal occurred in 1517 when Ottoman Turks fully took control of Syria at the end of the Ottoman-Mamluk war. The massacre began when the Ottoman Sultan Selim I summoned some Sunnite religious leaders and obtained from them a fatwa to fight "infidel" Alawis. The ensuing massacre resulted in the deaths of 9,400 Shiite men assembled in Aleppo.
