= Evvel Temmuz =

Evvel Temmuz Festival (Levantine Arabic: أول تموز ʾAwwal Tammūz) is a holiday celebrated every year on July 14th according to the Gregorian calendar, particularly in Samandağ, Antakya, and surrounding regions by Christians and Alawites. This day corresponds to July 1st in the Julian calendar. The term "Evvel Temmuz" literally means "The Beginning of July".

== Celebration in Turkey ==
In Turkey, this festival is celebrated primarily by Christians and Alawites living in Hatay. However, following the September 12, 1980 military coup, the celebration of this festival was banned. It was only in the 2000s that it began to be celebrated again.
