= Shrine of Khidr =

Shrine in Hatay Province, Turkey

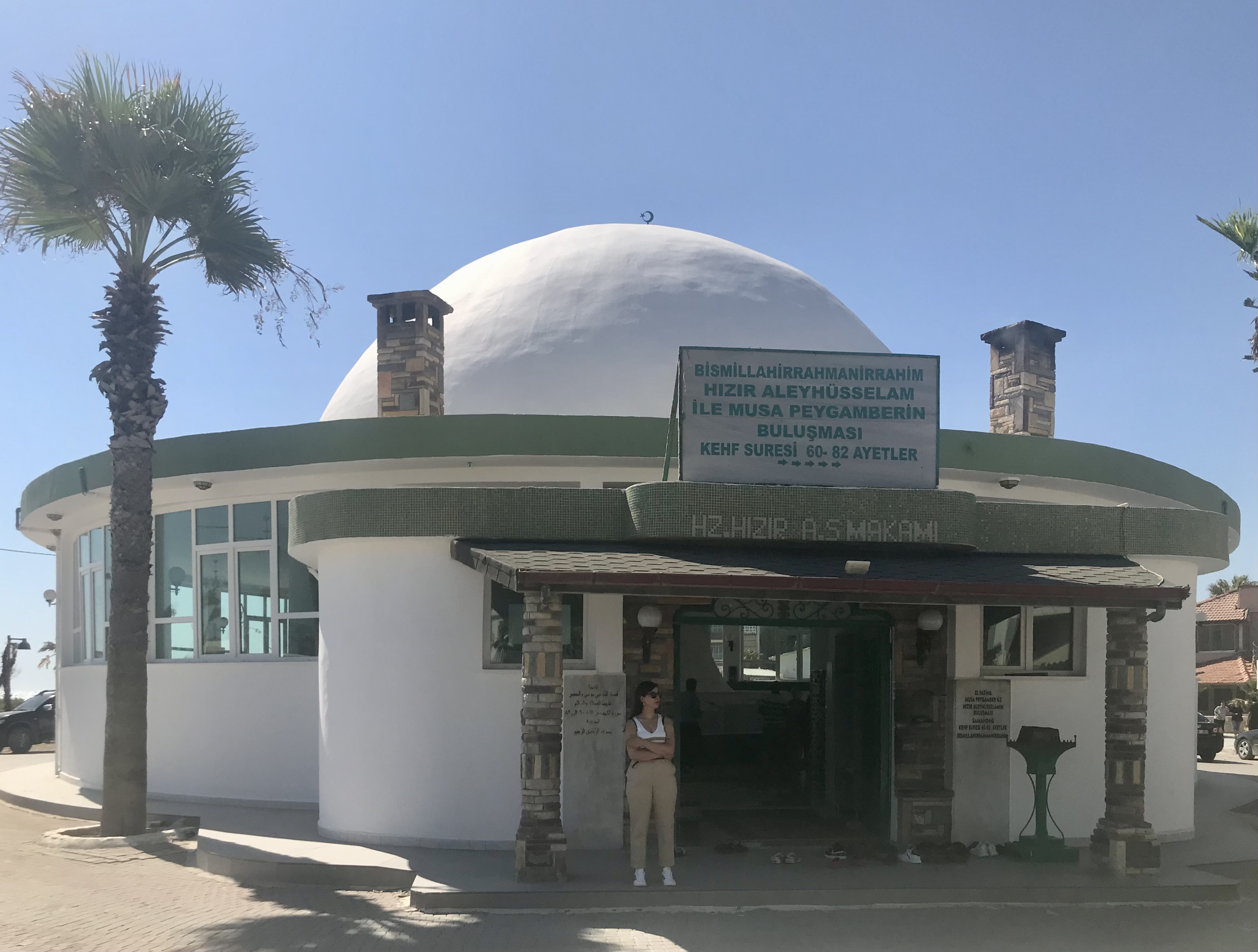

Religion
- Affiliation: Alawism

Location
- Location: Samandağ, Hatay
- Interactive map of Shrine of Khidr

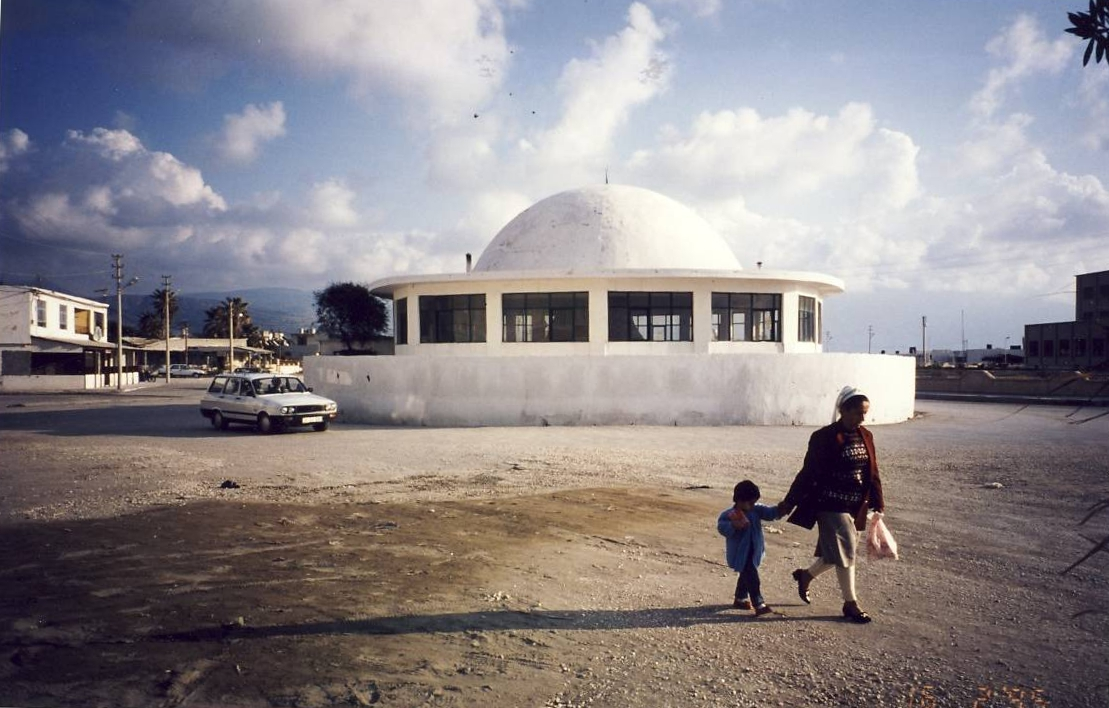
An older picture of the shrine

The Shrine of Khidr is a structure located in the Samandağ district of Hatay, which is especially considered sacred by the Alawites. It is believed by Alawites to be the spot where Khidr and Moses met.

== Alawite holidays ==
The shrine is visited by many people from the surrounding areas and neighboring provinces during most of the religious festivals celebrated by the Alawites. One example of this is the Hıdrellez Festival, celebrated every year on the night connecting May 5 to May 6 according to the Gregorian calendar. During these visits, fires are lit and wishes are made.

== Surah Al-Kahf ==
The inscription at the entrance and inside the shrine states that the aforementioned meeting is described in the Quran, in the section between verses 60 and 82 of Surah Al-Kahf (The Cave).

== See also ==
- Joshua's Hill
