= Al-Khasibi =

Scholar of Alawi sect

- الخصيبي

Personal life
- Born: 873
- Died: 968

Religious life
- Religion: Alawism

Senior posting
- Teacher: Ibn Nusayr
- Successor: Muhammad ibn Ali al-Jilli
- Initiated: Ali ibn Isa al-Jisri; Hasan ibn Shu'ba

Abu Abd Allah al-Husayn ibn Hamdan al-Junbalani al-Khasibi (Note: Arabic: أبو عبد الله الحسين بن حمدان الجنبلائي الخصيبي, romanized: Abu ʿAbd-Allāh al-Ḥusayn ibn Ḥamdān al-Junbalānī al-Khaṣībī) (873-968), commonly known simply as al-Khasibi, was a religious leader and missionary who played a central role in the development of the Nuṣayrī (later known as the Alawite) sect in Iraq and Syria.

Al-Khaṣībī originated from Jonbalā, a village situated between Kufa and Wasit in Iraq, which was the center of the Qarmatians. He was a member of a well-educated family with close ties to eleventh Twelver Imam Hasan al-Askari and a scholar of the Alawites, also known as Nusayris, which is now present in Syria, southern Turkey and northern Lebanon.

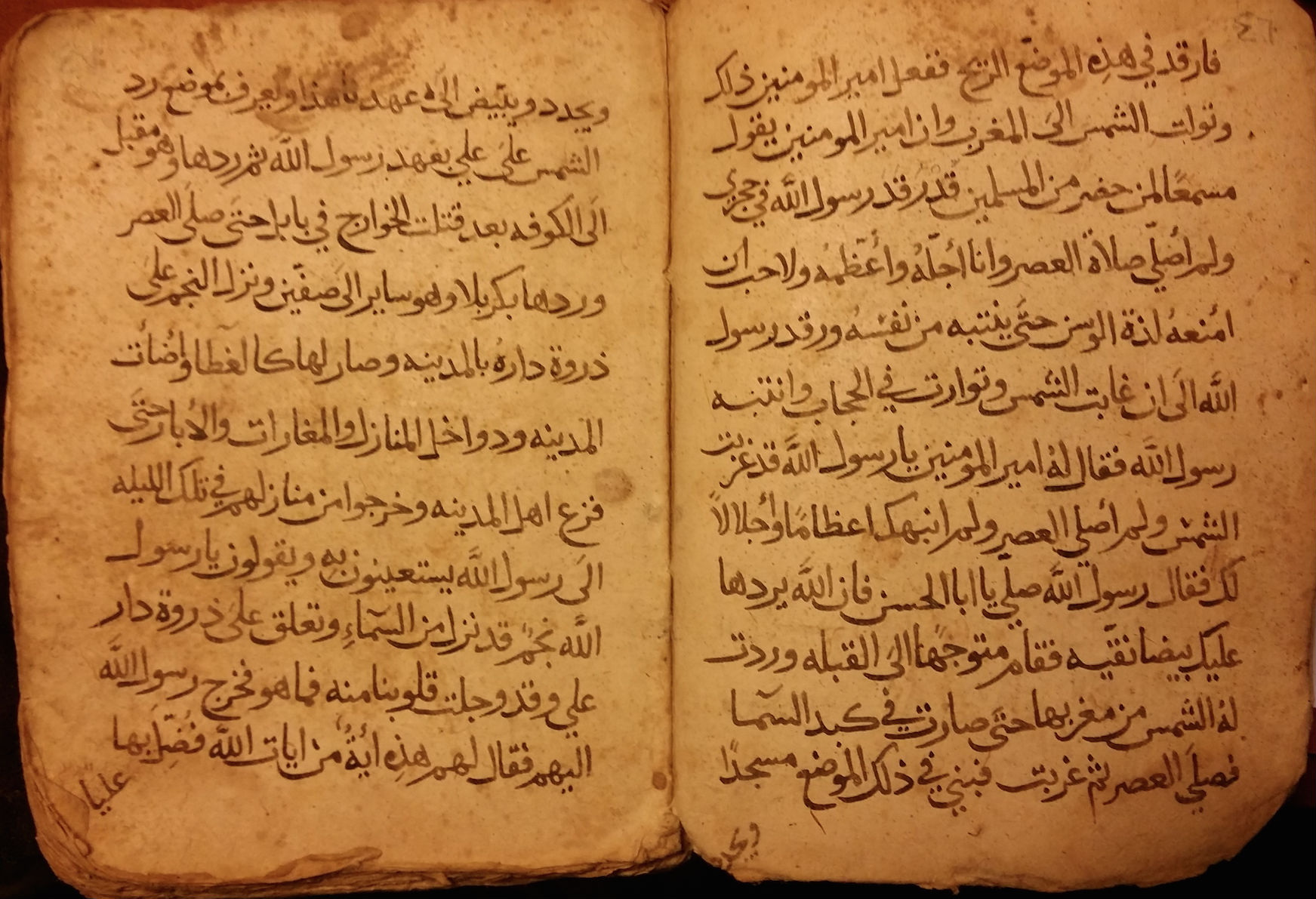
Egyptian manuscript from 1508 of a work by al-Khasibi.

For some time (the specific duration is unknown), al-Khaṣībī was imprisoned in Baghdad on accusations of Qarmatian affiliation. According to the Alawites, after settling in Aleppo, under the rule of the Shia Hamdanid dynasty, he gained the support and aid of its ruler, Sayf al-Dawla, in spreading his teachings. He later dedicated his book Kitab al-Hidaya al-Kubra to his patron. He died in Aleppo and his tomb, which became a shrine, is inscribed with the name Shaykh Yabraq.

He taught several unique beliefs (especially in Risalah Ristpashiyah), including that Jesus was every one of the prophets from Adam to Muhammad as well as other figures such as Socrates, Plato and some ancestors of Muhammad, and that other historical figures were the incarnations of Ali and Salman al-Farisi.

He and his works were praised by the Iranian Shiʿite scholar Muhammad Baqir Majlisi.

== Exposure to Nusayri doctrine ==
Al-Khasibi's first exposure to the teachings of Ibn Nusayr was through ʿAbdallāh al-Jannān, who was a student of Muḥammad ibn Jundab, who was a student of Nusayr himself. Having been initiated into the doctrine through al-Jannān, Khasibi was now al-Jannān's "spiritual son". With the death of al-Jannān, however, al-Khasibi had no means of continuing practice and study of the doctrine. This period of dryness ended later when he encountered an ʿAlī ibn Aḥmad, who claimed to be a direct disciple of Nusayr.

In this manner, al-Khasibi received transmission from both al-Jannān and ʿAlī ibn Aḥmad, thus continuing transmission of the Nusayri doctrine. Khasibi did not necessarily believe he was representative of a splinter, rebel group of the Shias, but rather believed he held the true doctrine of the Shias.

During his reign, the founder of the Alawite sect, al-Khasibi, benefited from Sayf al-Dawla's patronage. Al-Khasibi turned Aleppo into the stable centre of his new sect, and sent preachers from there as far as Persia and Egypt with his teachings.

== Hidaya al-Kubra ==
His main theological work, Kitab al-Hidaya al-Kubra, was dedicated to his Hamdanid patron. Sayf al-Dawla's active promotion of Shi'ism began a process whereby Syria came to host a large Shia population by the 12th century.

Hidaya al-Kubra is largely a collection of Hadiths common to Ismailis and Akhbari Twelver Shi'a. It sources mostly from The Four Books and Daim al-Islam; it also shares many narrations with Bihar al-Anwar, although not sourcing from it.

The work is considered the foundational work of the 'Zahiri canon' of Alawism, which is permitted for Alawite laymen to read, unlike the 'Batini canon,' which is only for initiates and Shaykhs.
