= Ibn Nusayr =

Arab religious leader (died 883)

Ibn Nusayr ابن نصير
- Title: A depiction by Alawites of the name Muhammad ibn Nusayr, accompanied by the phrase "peace be upon him."

Personal life
- Died: 883

Religious life
- Religion: Alawite
- Founder of: Alawism
- Philosophy: Aristotelianism, Platonism
- Sect: Alawite

Senior posting
- Teacher: Ali al‐Hadi, Hasan al‐Askari
- Initiated: Al-Khaṣībī

Abu Shu'ayb Muhammad ibn Nusayr al-Numayri (Note: Arabic: أبو شعيب محمد بن نصير النميري, romanized: Abū Shuʿayb Muḥammad ibn Nuṣayr al-Numayrī) (died c. 883), commonly known simply as Ibn Nusayr, was an Arab religious leader who is considered the founder of Alawism. He was a contemporary of Ali al-Hadi and Hasan al-Askari, the tenth and eleventh imams in Twelver Shi'ism.

Born in Basra to the Banu Numayr tribe, Ibn Nusayr is viewed by his followers as the bab (representative) of al-Askari and sometimes of Hujjat Allah al-Mahdi, during the Minor Occultation. A rival of his in claiming to be the Bāb (Door) to the Imams was Abu Yaqub Ishaq, founder of the Ishaqiyya.

Ibn Nusayr claimed that Ali Al-Hadi held a "divine nature". The followers of Ibn Nusayr are known as the Nusayris (Arabic: نصيري) or, since the 1920s, the Alawites (Arabic: علوي). Ibn Nusayr was an Arab from the northern tribe of Banu Numayr (or of Persian origin) but was associated with the Arab al-Namir tribe.

== Schisms ==
After the death of al‐Askari the Shia community was faced with the issue of who the Imam's successor was, some saying that al‐Askari left a son, Hujjat-Allah al-Mahdi, who communicated with the Shias through the Four Deputies. Ibn Nusayr claimed to have been intimate with the tenth and eleventh Imams, and upon hearing of the news of the hidden son attempted to claim that he was a representative of the hidden Imam. His claim was rejected by the mainstream Shias, and Ibn Nusayr was later excommunicated by Abu Jafar Muhammad ibn Uthman, the official second deputy of the hidden Imam.

An image of the Muhammad bin Nusayr Battalion’s electronic library

Nusayr was also prone to these antics earlier in his career when he claimed al‐Hadi was in fact divine and that he had been sent by al‐Hadi as a prophet, because of this he was officially 'cursed' by the Shia community. The second 'curse' was when he claimed to be the gate (bab) of al‐Askari. At any rate the gist is that Nusayr laid claim to being the most intimate of intimates of the tenth and eleventh Imams. The death of al‐Askari and the confusion as to his successor produced a schism in which Nusayr was officially banished from the Shia community. The mainstream (Twelver) Shias therefore were headed by the Four Deputies, whereas the Nusayris (Alawites) went underground.

Nusayr's excommunication from the Shia community and his conflict with the official representatives of the hidden Imam was probably representative of the tension produced by Askari's death. Without a successor, there were only two routes: the Babs (intimates of the Imams who claimed to know their will) and the Wukala (representatives).

Nusayr did not lay claim to being the bab of both Imams, per se, rather he claimed to be the bab of al‐Hadi, and during the lifetime of al‐Askari, his ism. The doctrine of the ma'na, ism and bab is a Nusayri doctrine. Obviously, Nusayr's ambition was to present himself as being intimate with the hidden Imam (in a way trying to "catch that wave") however this did not work out. This is important to note, because if al‐Askari did not leave a son, then the true successors to the Shia community would have been the bābs of the Imams, and not an invisible son of questionable historicity, to whom is attributed divine powers and unnaturally long lifespan. Seen in this way, it might be said that prior to the extreme‐moderate Shia split, the entire Shia community was one, but upon the death of al‐Askari (the ten previous imams having been legitimate), the Alawite doctrine was exiled with Nusayr and his followers into Syria and Turkey, where the abdal are predicted to reside.
