= Fadwa Souleimane =

Syrian actress

Fadwa Suleiman فدوى سليمان
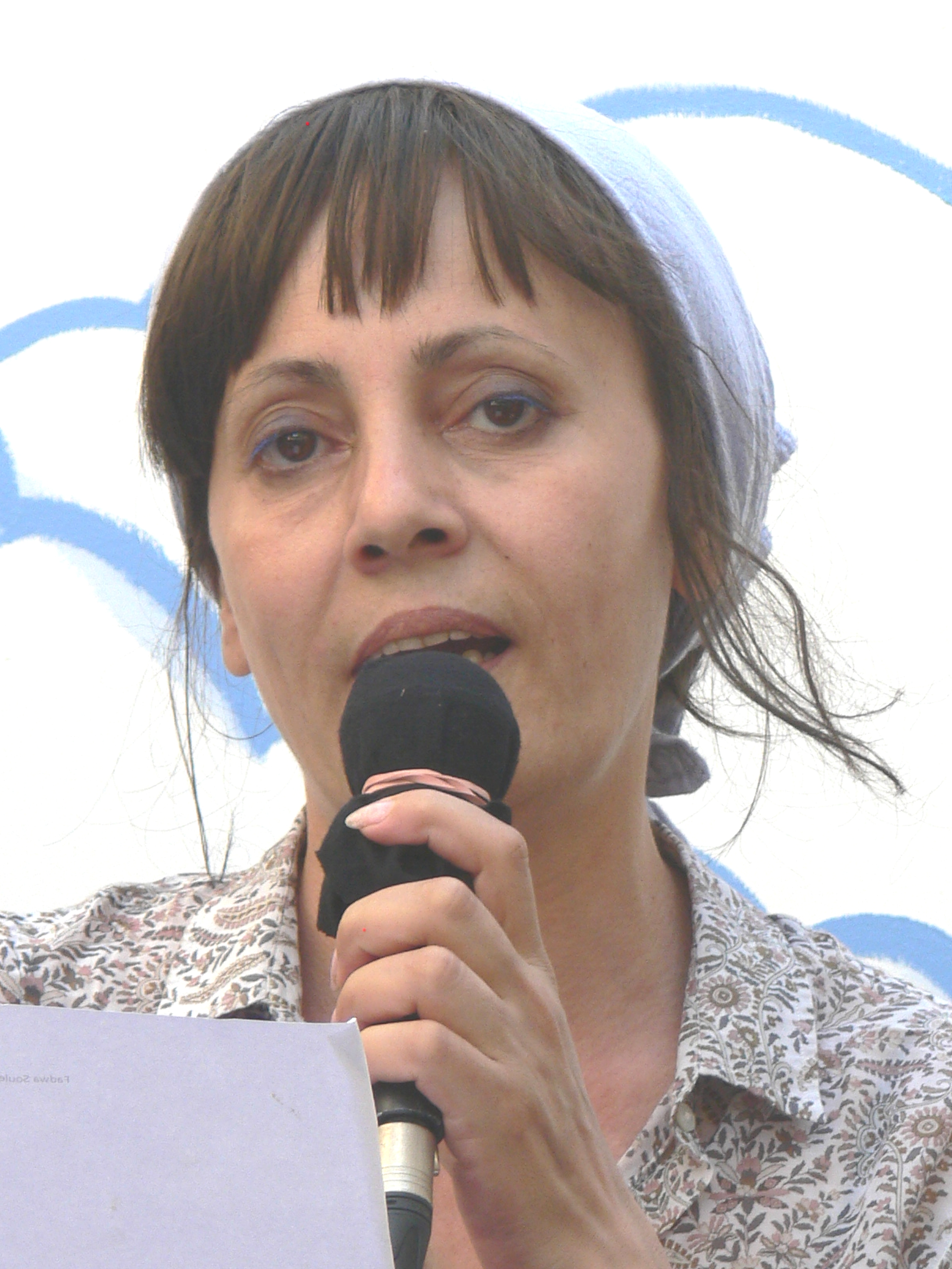
- Fadwa Suleiman in July 2017
- Born: 17 May 1970; Aleppo, Syria
- Died: 17 August 2017 (aged 47); Paris, France
- Occupations: Actress; voice artist

Fadwa Souleimane (also transcribed as Fadwa Souleiman or Fadwa Suleiman; 17 May 1970 – 17 August 2017) was a Syrian actress of who led many Syrian protests against Bashar al-Assad's government in Homs. She became one of the most recognized faces of the Syrian Revolution.

== Acting career ==
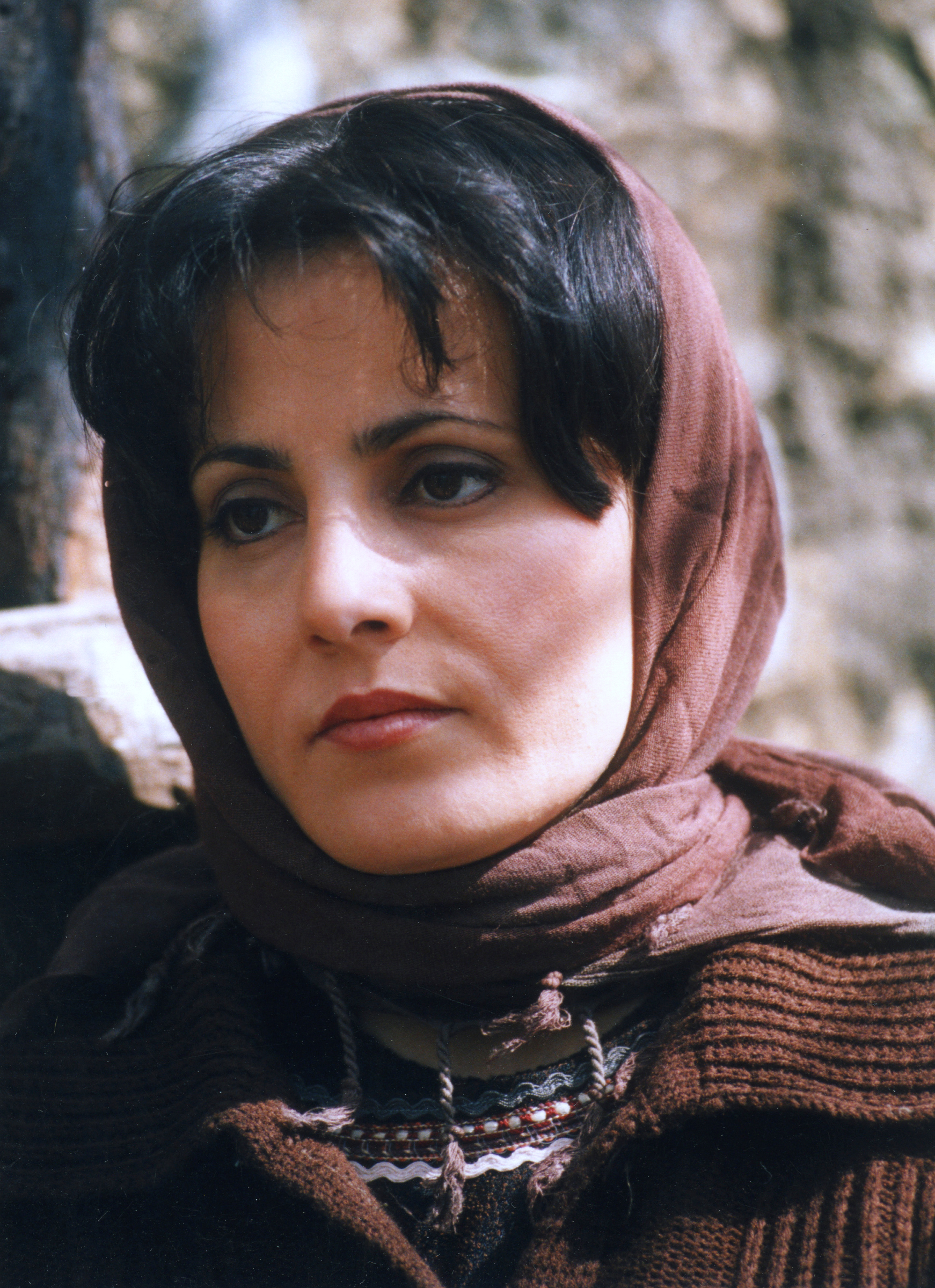
Fadwa Suleiman in 2003

Born in Aleppo, Suleiman moved to the capital Damascus to pursue an acting career where she performed in numerous plays, Maria's Voice and Media, and in at least a dozen TV shows, including in The Diary of Abou Antar and Little Ladies. She also played an art teacher at an orphanage in "Small Hearts," a television series that helped raise awareness about human organ trafficking and was broadcast by several Arab channels. She also acted in an Arabic adaptation of Henrik Ibsen's "A Doll's House" at the Qabbani theater in Damascus.

== Role in Syrian uprising ==
At the start of the Syrian uprising in 2011, Suleiman was one of the few outspoken actresses to protest against the government of Syrian President Bashar al-Assad. Facing possible death or imprisonment, Suleiman wanted to participate in the demonstration to dispel what she said was public perception that all in the Alawite community, which comprised around 10 percent of the Syrian population, supported the government of fellow Alawite Bashar al-Assad. She also wanted to dismiss the government's narrative that those who participated in protests were armed terrorists. She appeared at rallies demanding Assad's removal, sharing the podium with soccer star Abdul Baset al-Sarout, one of a number of other prominent Syrians who backed the revolt.

Suleiman also delivered impassioned monologues to camera, calling for peaceful protests to continue across the country until Assad was overthrown. “Sectarian violence in Homs would be worse if it weren’t for Fadwa Suleiman,” says Peter Harling, Syria analyst at the International Crisis Group, the think tank. “She has tried to contain the damage among Alawites who have been hijacked by the regime.”

In one video message in 2011, Suleiman said security forces were searching Homs neighborhoods for her, and beating people to force them to reveal her hiding place. She cut her hair short like a boy, and moved from house to house to evade capture. In 2012, she fled via Lebanon and moved to France, where she resided in Paris.

== Death ==
On August 17, 2017, Suleiman died of cancer in exile in Paris, aged 47.

== Filmography ==
=== Dubbing roles ===
- Inazuma Eleven (season 1 only) - Mamoru Endou
- Hamtaro (season 4 only) - Bijou, Howdy, Kana Iwata
- Battle B-Daman - Yamato Daiwa
  - Battle B-Daman: Fire Spirits! - Yamato Daiwa
- The Story of Cinderella - Jeanne, Bingo (1st dub)
- Tom & Jerry Kids - Jerry Mouse
- Naruto - Inari
- Monster Rancher - Genki Sakura
- Secret of Cerulean Sand - William F. Buxton/Harry Killer, Sabri, Bunch
- What-a-Mess - What-a-Mess
- The Marshmallow Times - Clove
- Ojamajo Doremi - Dela
- The Spooktacular New Adventures of Casper - Kathleen "Kat" Harvey (Venus Centre version)
- Casper's Scare School - Mantha (Venus Centre version)
- Anime Himitsu no Hanazono - Mary Lennox (1st dub)
- Cyborg Kuro-chan - Kuro (2nd voice) (Venus Centre version)
- Grander Musashi - Mio Hoshiyama
- Bomberman B-Daman Bakugaiden - White Bomber/Bomberman
- Digimon Adventure - Sora Takenouchi, Patamon, Tokomon, Angemon, Vamdemon, Natsuko Takaishi, Gazimon (one of three)
- Digimon Adventure 02 - Iori Hida, Sora Takenouchi, Patamon, Tokomon, Angemon, Gekomon, Ken Ichijouji (Young), Michael Washington, Jun Motomiya, Kae Izumi, HolyAngemon, Natsuko Takaishi
- Baby & Me - Tadashi Gotoh, Hiroko "Hiro" Gotoh
- Bakusō Kyōdai Let's & Go!! - Gō Seiba (Venus Center version)
- Bakusō Kyōdai Let's & Go!! Max - Gō Seiba, Hitoshi Matsu
- Pokémon - Officer Jenny (1st voice), Tommy, Cassidy
- Sonic the Hedgehog (SatAM) - Sonic the Hedgehog
- Sonic X - Sonic the Hedgehog, Shadow the Hedgehog
- Astro Boy - Astro Boy
- Emily of New Moon - Perry Miller (1st voice), Aileen Kent (1st voice), Narration
- Little Women II: Jo's Boys - Josephine "Jo" Bhaer (Venus Center version)
- The Great Book of Nature (Venus Centre version)
- The Pink Panther (Venus Centre version)
- Space Warrior Baldios
- Charley and Mimmo (Venus Centre version)
- Bartok the Magnificent - Piloff
- Animaniacs - Colin, Katie Ka-Boom
- Hunter × Hunter - Old Lady Quizzer
- Dennō Bōkenki Webdiver - Charon
- Babar - Pom (Venus Centre version)
- Rainbow Fish - Rainbow Fish (Venus Centre version)
- Hi no Ame ga Furu - Shizu
- Detective Conan - Ayako Suzuki, Reiko Saeki, Kaori Nakahara
- The Fantastic Voyages of Sinbad the Sailor - Sawar
- Tommy & Oscar - Girl (Venus Centre version)
- Nobody's Boy: Remi - Rémi Barberin (Venus Centre version)
- Get Ed - Ed, the Protector
- Ushiro no Shoumen Daare
- Mr. Seguin's Goat - White Goat (1st dub)
- 千千问 - 小布
