= Ali Qaddour =

Sheikh Ali Mahmoud Qaddour is the head of the Islamic Alawite Council in Lebanon, headquartered in Jabal Mohsen, Tripoli. Qaddour was voted head of the council in 2023. Upon his election, he confirmed the engagement of the council in supporting interfaith dialogue and cooperation in the city and region.

In 2013, Qaddour was the Alawite representative at an iftar in support of Syrian refugees, aiming to unite Sunnis, Christians, and Alawites despite the war in Syria. During the 2024 Israel-Hezbollah war, Qaddour stated that Israel's aim was to sow discord and division among the Lebanese to drive them away from the Palestinian cause. On July 28, 2025, Qaddour visited John X, Greek Orthodox Patriarchate of Antioch, to offer condolences to the martyrs of the St. Elias Church massacre in Syria, and to discuss developments in the situation. Qaddour met Pope Leo XIV during his visit to Lebanon November 30 - December 2, 2025, where he expressed "support for every initiative that promotes stability, revives hope in hearts, and encourages the Lebanese to engage in dialogue and understanding".

On April 23, 2026, Qaddour met Lebanese Army Commander-in-Chief, General Rodolphe Haykal, where they stressed the need to preserve stability and peace during the sensitive period Lebanon was experiencing. On June 2022 of the same year, Qaddour met the Lebanese President Joseph Aoun to discuss the country's situation and issues of concern to the Alawite community, such as their representation in civilian and military institutions, and expressed support for the President's steps to strengthen security in the country. In August 2026, after Qaddour delivered an eulogy to the late Iranian leader Ali Khamenei at his funeral, Lebanese Alawite MP Haidar Nasser scolded Qaddour, and stated Alawites had no need to get involved in political alignments.
