= Banyas =

Banyas may refer to:

- Banias, a location in the Golan Heights, ancient Paneas
- Baniyas, a town on the Syrian coast, ancient Balanea
