= Musa al-Mubarqa' =

Son of Muhammad al-Jawad

- موسى المبرقع
- Born: 829 CE; Medina, Arabia
- Died: 909 CE (aged 80); Qom, modern-day Iran
- Resting place: Qom
- Known for: Ancestor of Ridawi sayyids
- Parents: Muhammad al-Jawad (father); Samana (mother)
- Relatives: Ali al-Hadi (brother); Hakima (sister)

Mūsā ibn Muḥammad al-Mubarqaʿ (Arabic: موسى بن محمد المبرقع) was a descendant of the Islamic prophet Muhammad. Musa was the son of Muhammad al-Jawad (d. 835) and the younger brother of Ali al-Hadi (d. 868), the ninth and tenth Imams in Twelver Shia. He is known to be a common ancestor of the Ridawi sayyids, who descended from the Islamic prophet Muhammad through Ali al-Rida (d. 818), the eighth Imam in Twelver Shia and Musa's grandfather. He was known by the title al-Mubarqaʿ (Arabic: المبرقع) probably because he covered his face with a burqa' (Arabic: بُرقَع, lit. 'veil') to remain anonymous in public. Traditions narrated by him are cited by some Twelver scholars, including al-Kulayni and al-Mufid.

== Biography ==
Musa al-Mubarqa' was the younger son of Muhammad al-Jawad (d. 835), the ninth Imam in Twelver Shia. His elder brother Ali al-Hadi (d. 868) succeeded their father al-Jawad as the tenth Imam. Musa had two or four sisters, named variously in the sources. The Twelver theologian al-Mufid (d. 1022) names them as Fatima and Amama, while the biographical source Dala'il al-imama lists them as Khadija, Hakima, and Umm Kulthum. This book is attributed to al-Tabari al-Saghir, the eleventh-century Twelver scholar. The Sunni historian Fakhr Razi (d. 1209) adds Behjat and Barihe to these names, saying that none of them left any descendants. The children of al-Jawad were all born to Samana, a freed slave (umm walad) of Moroccan origin. It is through Ali and Musa that the lineage of al-Jawad continued. In particular, the Ridawi line of sayyids leads to Musa. These are the descendants of the Islamic prophet Muhammad through Ali al-Rida (d. 818), the eighth Imam in Twelver Shia and Musa's grandfather.

Musa was a small child when his father al-Jawad died in 835 CE at the age of about twenty-five, probably poisoned at the instigation of the Abbasid caliph al-Mu'tasim (r. 833–842). The will attributed to al-Jawad stipulates that his elder son Ali would inherit from him and be responsible for his younger brother Musa and his sisters. This will can be found in Kitab al-Kafi, a collection of Shia traditions compiled by the prominent Twelver traditionist al-Kulayni (d. 941). There was also an oral designation (nass) of Ali as the next Imam, delivered to a close confidant by al-Jawad. After his death, this testimony was corroborated by a small assembly of Shia notables, and the majority of his followers thus accepted the imamate of Ali, who is commonly known by the titles al-Hadi (lit. 'the guide') and al-Naqi (lit. 'the distinguished'). A small group also gathered around Musa but soon returned to his brother Ali after the former dissociated himself from them. Musa later settled in Qom, a rising Shia center in the modern-day Iran. Traditions narrated by him are cited by some Twelver scholars, including al-Kulayni in his al-Kafi, al-Mufid in his al-Ikhtisas, and Shaykh Tusi (d. 1067) in his Tahdhib al-osul. Musa was known by the title al-Mubarqa' (Arabic: المبرقع) probably because he covered his face with a burqa' (Arabic: بُرقَع, lit. 'veil') to remain unidentified in public. He died in Qom in 909 CE and the construction of his current shrine was sponsored by the Safavid king Tahmasp I (r. 1524–1576).

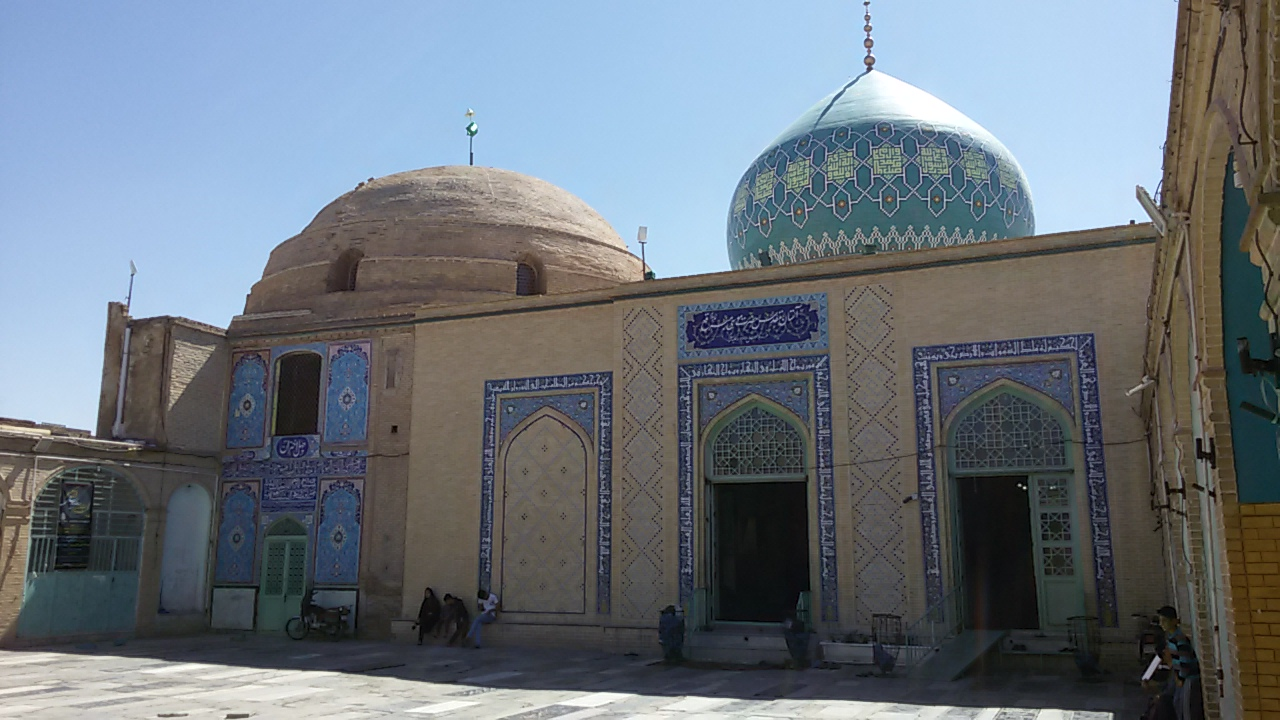
The shrine of Musa al-Mubarqa' in Chehel Akhtaran, Qom, Iran

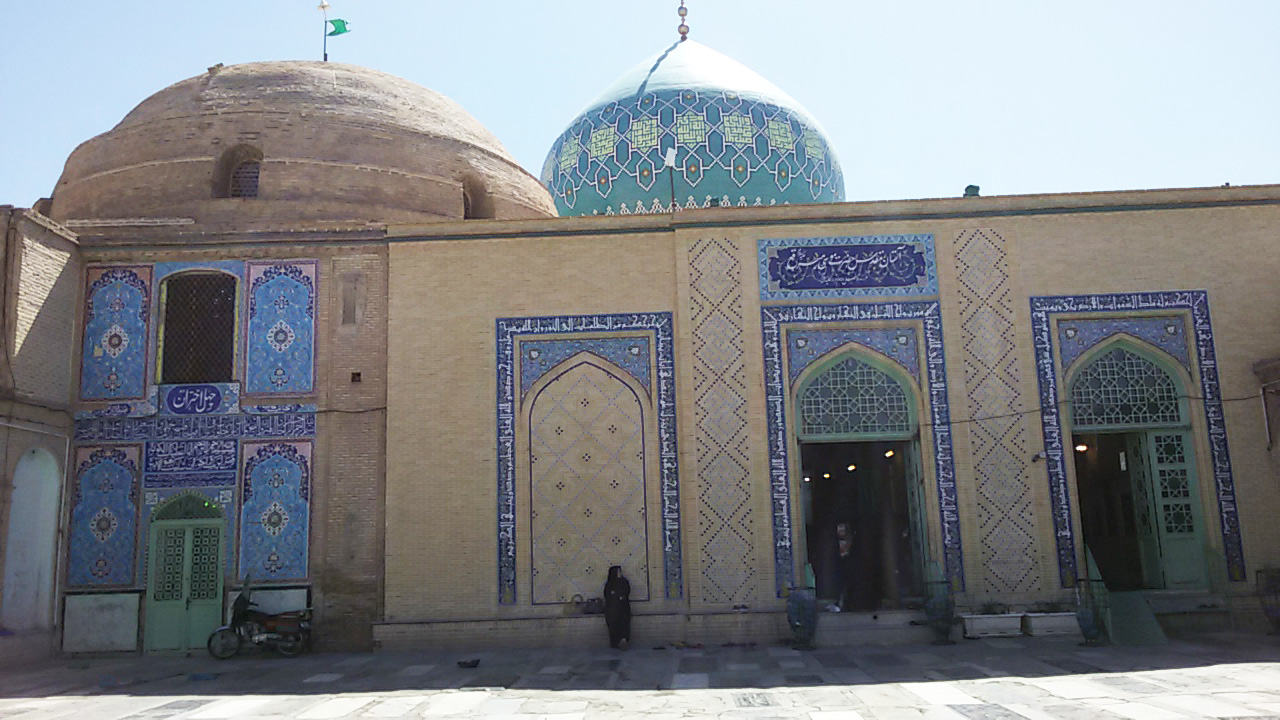

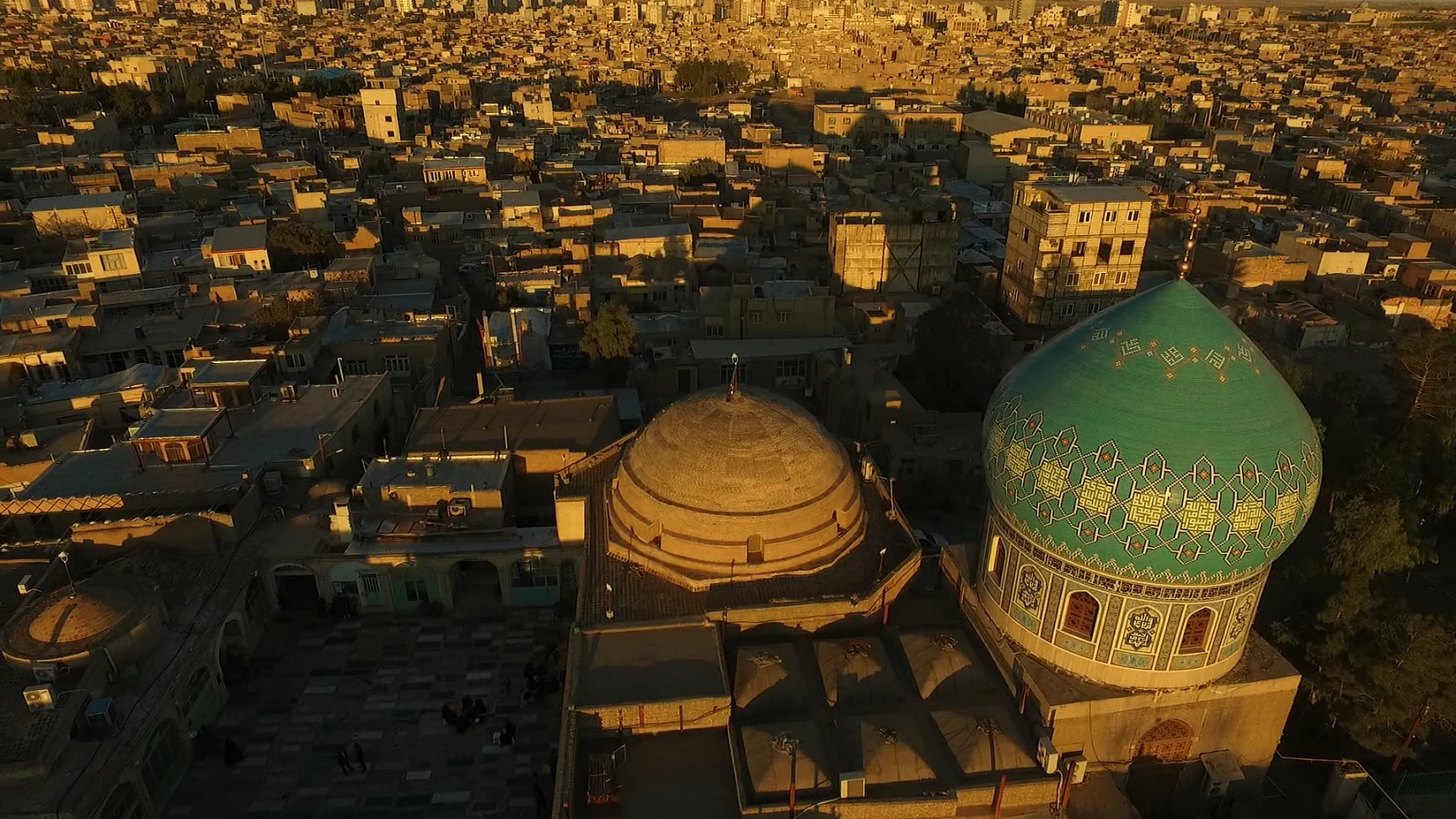
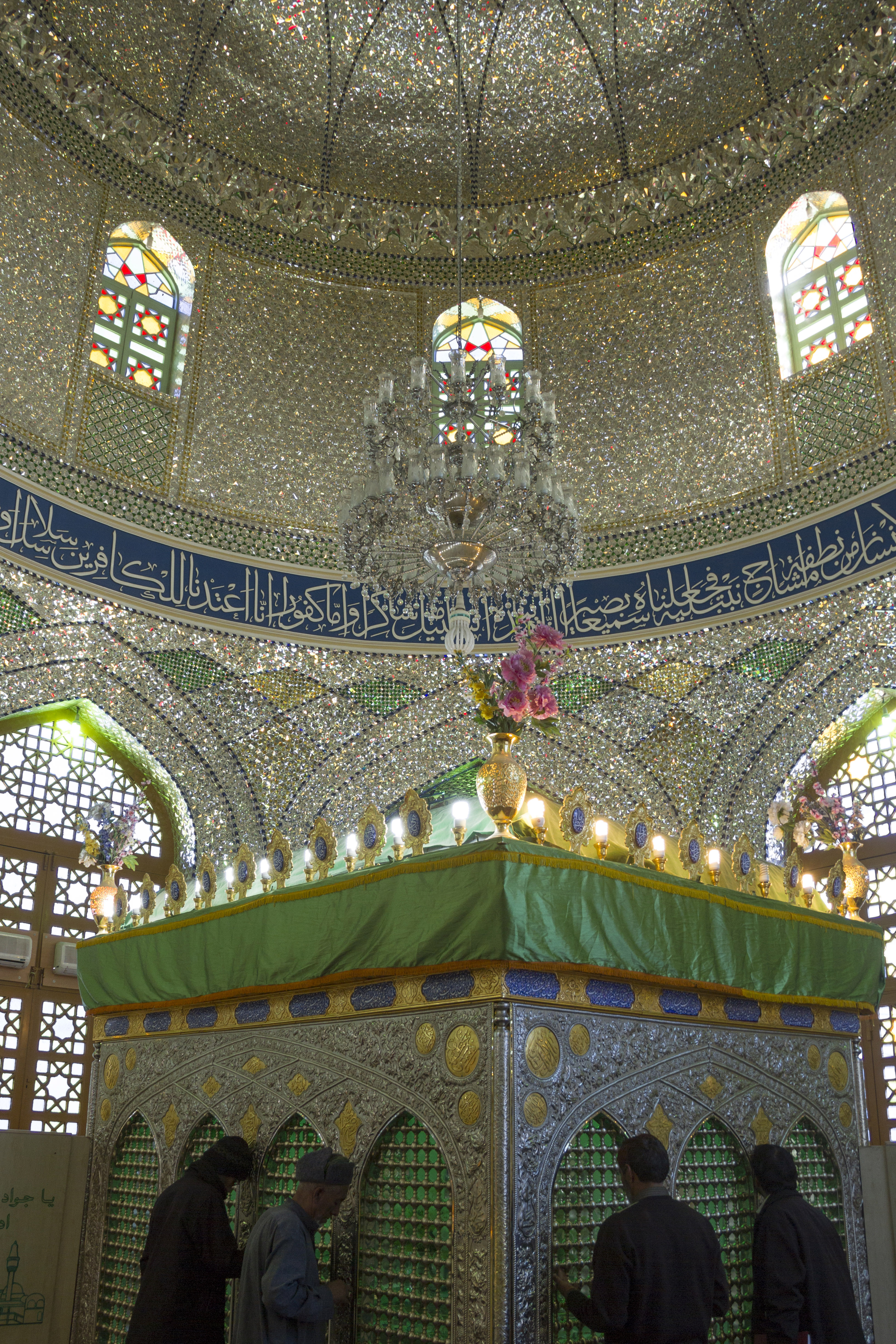
The zarih that holds his grave

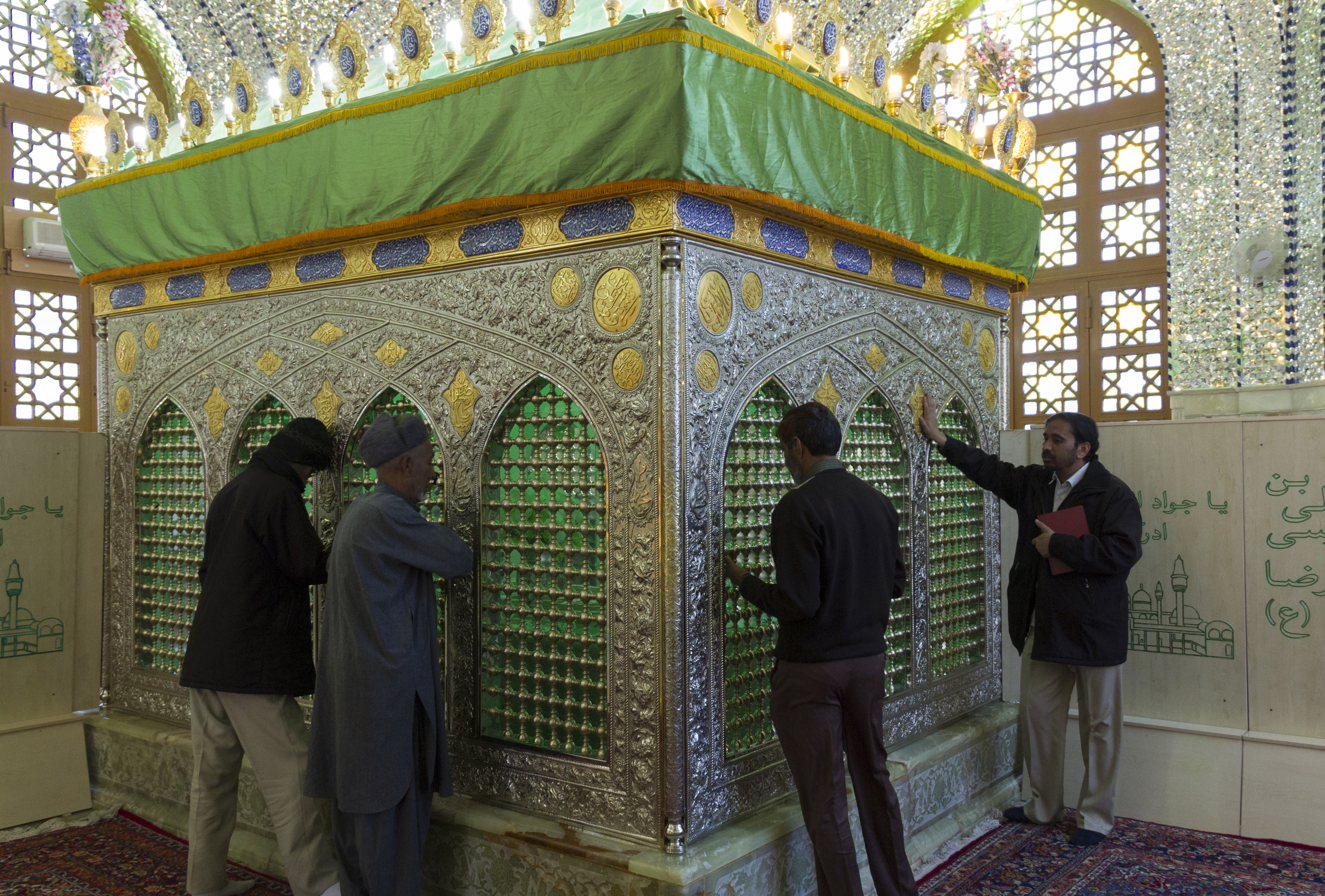

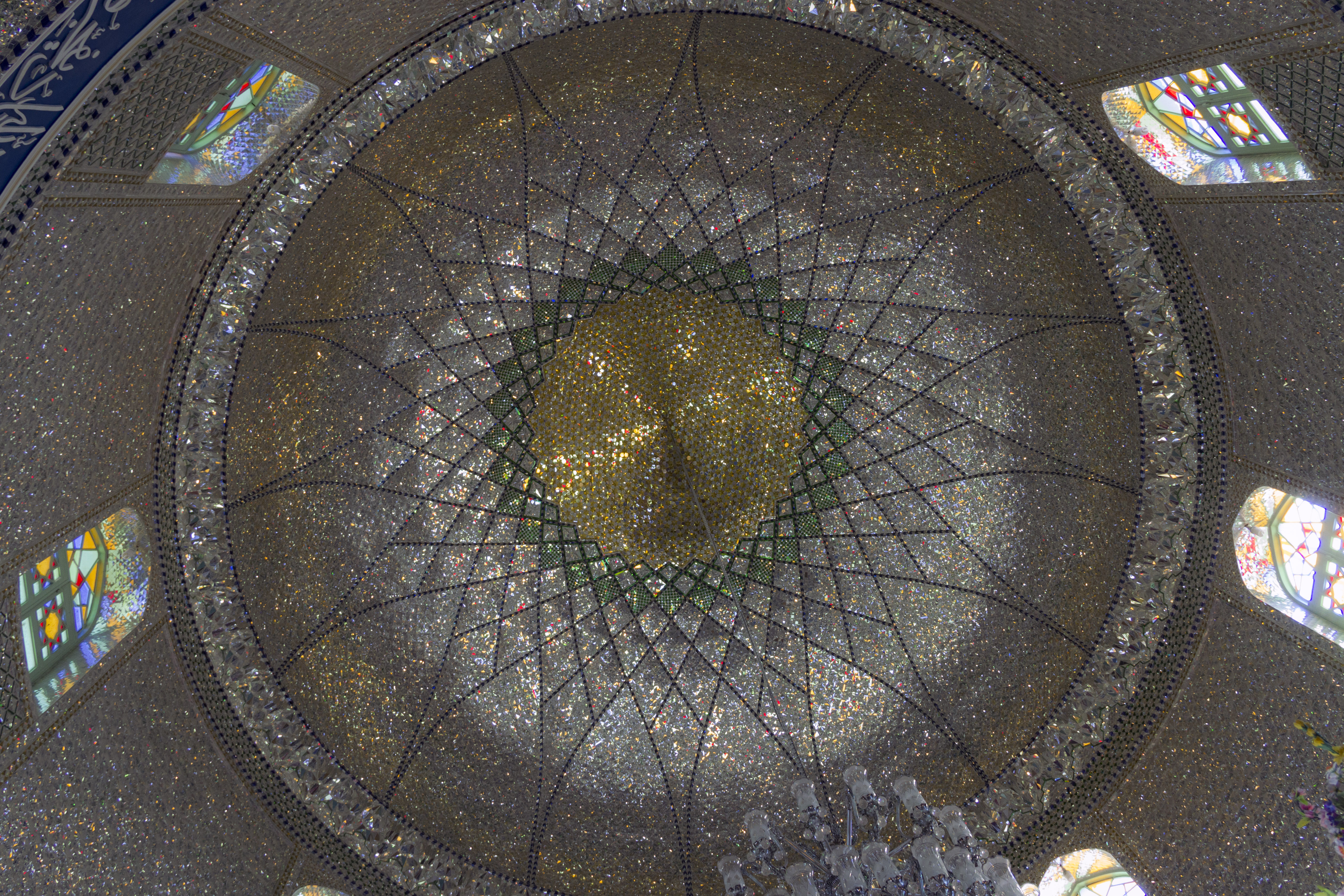
Mirror-work inside the shrine

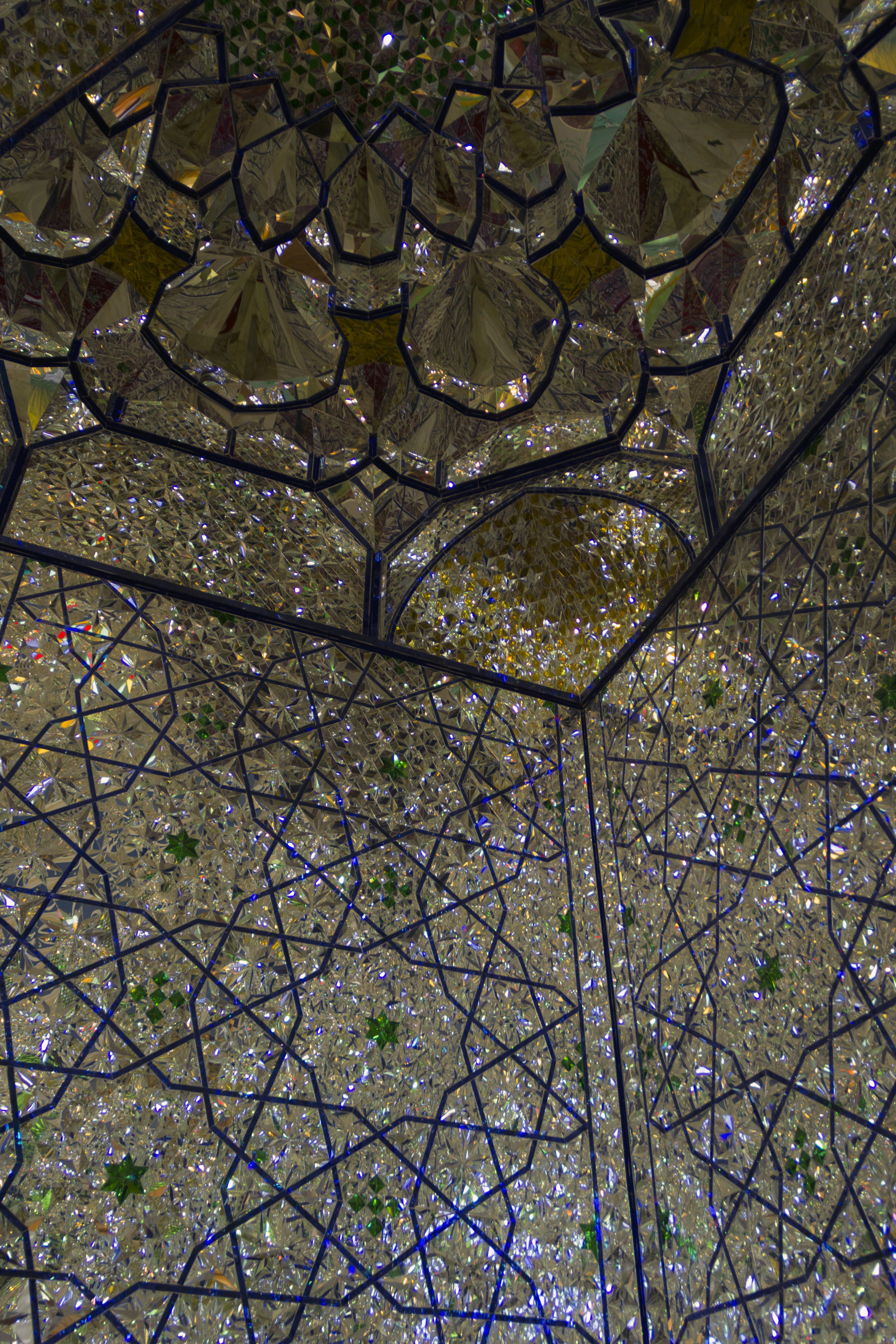

== See also ==
- Imamzadeh Ali ibn Jafar
