= Al-Kazimiyya Mosque =

Twelver Shi'ite mosque and shrine in Baghdad, Iraq

Al-Kadhimiyya Mosque
- مَسْجِد ٱلْكَاظِمِيَّة
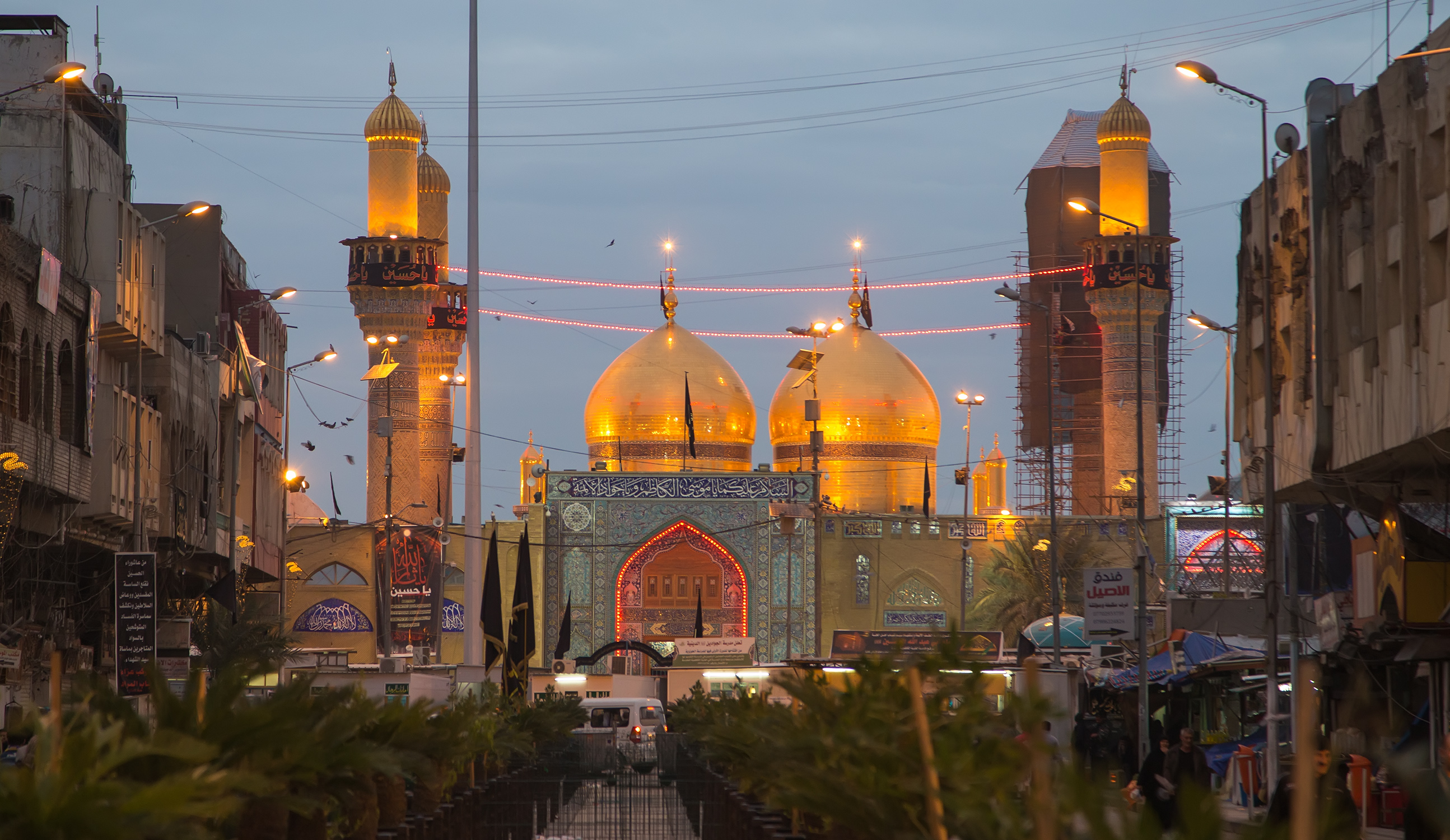

- Location of the mosque in Baghdad

Religion
- Affiliation: Islam
- Branch/tradition: Shia (Twelver)
- Ecclesiastical or organisational status: Mosque; Marqad
- Status: Active

Location
- Location: Kadhimiyya in Baghdad, Iraq
- Country: Iraq
- Interactive map of Al-Kadhimiyya Mosque
- Coordinates: 33°22′48″N 44°20′17″E

Architecture
- Type: Mosque
- Style: Islamic architecture Safavid Iranian
- Completed: 762 CE; 16th century (renovations)

Specifications
- Length: 140 m (460 ft)
- Width: 135 m (443 ft)
- Dome: Three
- Minarets: Four (large); Four (small)
- Minaret height: 60 m (200 ft) (large); 29.5 m (97 ft) (small)
- Shrines: Six: Musa al-Kadhim; Muhammad al-Jawad; Al-Shaykh al-Mufid; Nasir al-Din al-Tusi; Al-Sharif al-Radi; Sharif al-Murtaza
- Materials: Bricks; marble; gold

The Kadhimiyya Mosque (Arabic: مَسْجِد ٱلْكَاظِمِيَّة, romanized: Masjid al-Kāẓimiyya) is a Twelver Shi'ite mosque and shrine located in the Kādhimiya suburb of Baghdad, in the Baghdad Governorate of Iraq. It contains the tombs of the seventh and ninth Twelver Shī'ī Imāms, respectively Mūsā al-Kādhim and his grandson Muhammad al-Jawad. Also buried within the premises of this mosque are the historical scholars Shaykh Mufīd and Shaykh Naṣīr ad-Dīn aṭ-Ṭūsi. Directly adjacent to the mosque are two smaller shrines, belonging to the brothers Sayyid Raḍī (who compiled Nahjul-Balāghah) and Sayyid Murtadā and Qadi Abu Yusuf al-Ansari.

== Historical background ==
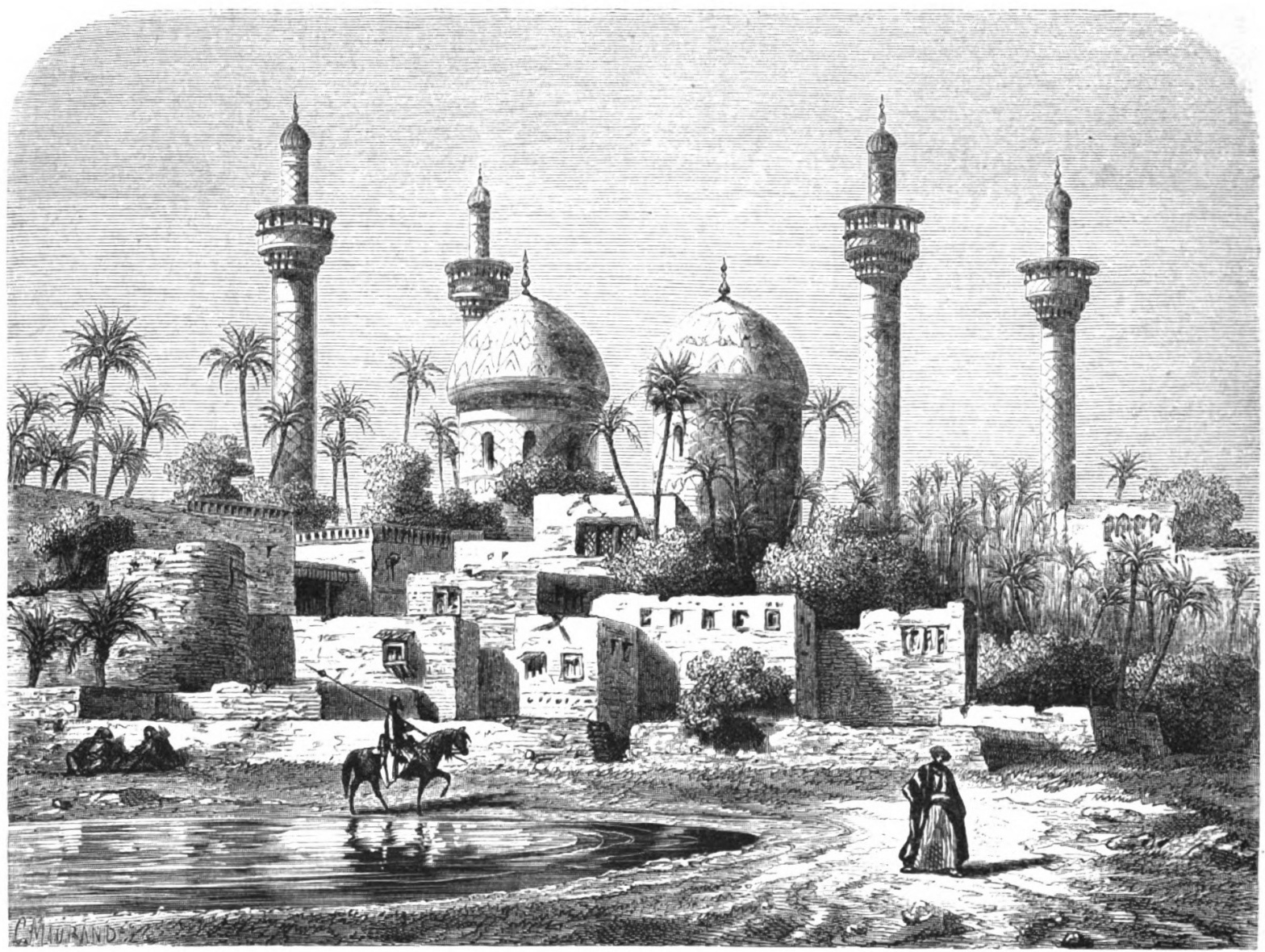
An illustration of the mosque from 1861.

The mosque was built on the site of a Quraysh cemetery, which was created with the original Round City of Baghdad in 762 CE. The cemetery in an old Arab town named "Shoneezi" (Meaning the Black Grain) was founded by Abbasid Caliph al-Mansur so that members of his family and internment can be buried in it. It is generally believed that Zubaidah bint Ja'far and al-Mansur himself were also buried in this location. The town, along with its tombs, would become al-Kadhimiya, an area and suburb located north of central Baghdad. This cemetery became the burial site of the seventh Twelver imam Musa al-Kadhim in 799, followed by his grandson, the ninth imam Muhammad al-Jawad, in 834 CE. The current building dates to the restoration carried out by the Safavid Iranian Shah Ismail I from 1502 to 1524. It was further ornamented by the Ottoman Sultan Suleiman the Magnificent after he conquered Baghdad in 1534. Since then, it has continued to be kept in a state of good repair. Similar to many other Islamic settlements throughout history, settlements throughout time started to develop around the mosque which came to be known as al-Kadhimiyya area.

In 1611, the Ottoman Sultan and Caliph Ahmed I granted Jamal al-Din bin Mullah Ali, a descendant from Bani Shaiba, a firman, a royal decree, allowing him and his family to have full custodianship of the mosque and its shrine. Ancestors of Jamal became known as the al-Jamali family who were entrusted with the mosque and kept the firman. Among the most notable members of the al-Jamali family was Sheikh Abbas al-Jamali, who lived next to the mosque with visitors meeting him and was the father of Iraqi Statesman Muhammad Fadhel al-Jamali, who would become one of the founders of the United Nations in 1945.

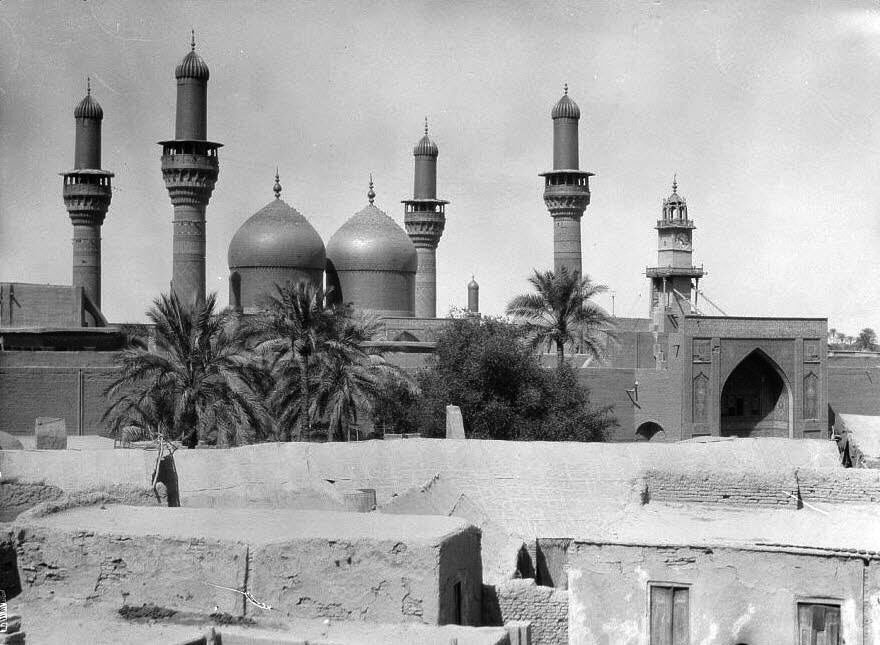
Al-Kadhimiyya Mosque as seen in 1932.

During the 1920 Iraq Revolt against the British Empire, al-Kadhimyya Mosque was among the many sites around Baghdad to see national gatherings aimed to revolt against the British. These gatherings were noted by Musa al-Shabandar who saw similar gatherings such as in the Haydar-Khana Mosque. These gatherings coincided with Mawlid and Husayni condolences and saw significant Islamic unification as noted by al-Shabandar.

=== Post-2003 invasion ===
During and after the Iraq War, the mosque was among the many sites across Iraq to be targeted by terrorist attacks. On 2 March 2004, at least 75 people were killed and hundreds of others were wounded as crowds had gathered to commemorate Ashura. The event caused outrage and led to angry crowds injuring two American soldiers by stoning them. Iraq's Governing Council blamed the attack on terrorists inflaming sectarian tensions. Concurrent explosions also occurred at the Imām Husayn Mosque in Karbalā. This mosque was the destination of the crowd that was caught up in the Baghdad bridge stampede.

On 6 June 2007, at least seven people were killed after twin car bombings occurred near the mosque, one at al-Zahra'a Square, and the second 300 metres (980 ft) away at the Aden intersection. The event coincided with police officers discovering the 47 victims of torture conducted by Shi'i Sectarianist militants. Almost exactly a year later on the evening of 27 June 2007, a car bomb killed at least 14 people and injured 22 others. Officials say that the victims were mostly locals "enjoying a warm summer evening."

On 28 March 2004, a freshly gilded dome over the grave of Muhammad al-Taqi was unveiled to the public, as crowds had gathered in celebration of Mawlid (the birthday of Muhammad) as well as the birthday anniversary of his descendant, Ja'far al-Sadiq.

On 28 December 2008, a car bomb exploded on a busy road leading to the mosque killing at least 24 people and wounding 46 others, many of them visitors to the mosque. The explosion occurred about 91 metres (100 yd) from Bab al-Dirwaza, one of the main gates to the shrine.

On 7 January 2009, a male suicide bomber, dressed as a woman, killed 38 and injured 72 visitors as they were preparing for the day of Ashura. The attack was considered one of its worst in months by the Los Angeles Times. Later on 8 April 2009, 7 people were killed and 23 others were wounded after a bomb that was left in a plastic bag near the mosque detonated. Iraqi officials have warned that they expect a rise in attacks. Then on 24 April 2009, violence hit its highest since the U.S. invasion of Iraq in 2003, and among the attacks included two female suicide bombers killed at least 66 people and wounded 125 others as people were heading towards the mosque for Friday prayers. The attacks was suspected to be backed by al-Qaeda in Iraq. Residents in the area called the event a "massacre" noting the bodies, some burnt, scattered on the ground. The event caused many Iraqi security men to be suspended due to their lack of providing adequate security around the shrine.

On 7 May 2016, a triple-car bomb series goes off. At least 21 visitors were killed and 45 injured. The visitors were commemorating the martyrdom of Imam Musa Al-Kadhim. Immediately after the blasts, the terrorist group ISIS claimed responsibility. Iraqi Security forces have blocked major roads in Baghdad in anticipation of attacks against the visitors who traditionally travel on foot from different parts of Iraq and used the event to stop antigovernmental protests.

The mosque remains busy with visitors from all over the Islamic world and is considered a beautiful Islamic architectural landmark. The forecourts of the mosque have also been expanded. Although the expansion of the mosque and shrine have been severely criticized due to neglect of its heritage surroundings and the removing of its old urban fabric. More than 130 old archeological sites, traditional houses, Ottoman landmarks, and heritage buildings have reportedly been demolished in order to make way for the expansion with calls on institutions to preserve the remaining heritage buildings being made. The development has also been criticized for the disregard of using historically accurate material in construction and instead the use of modern materials to replace it.

== Repairs and maintenance ==
=== Inner structure ===
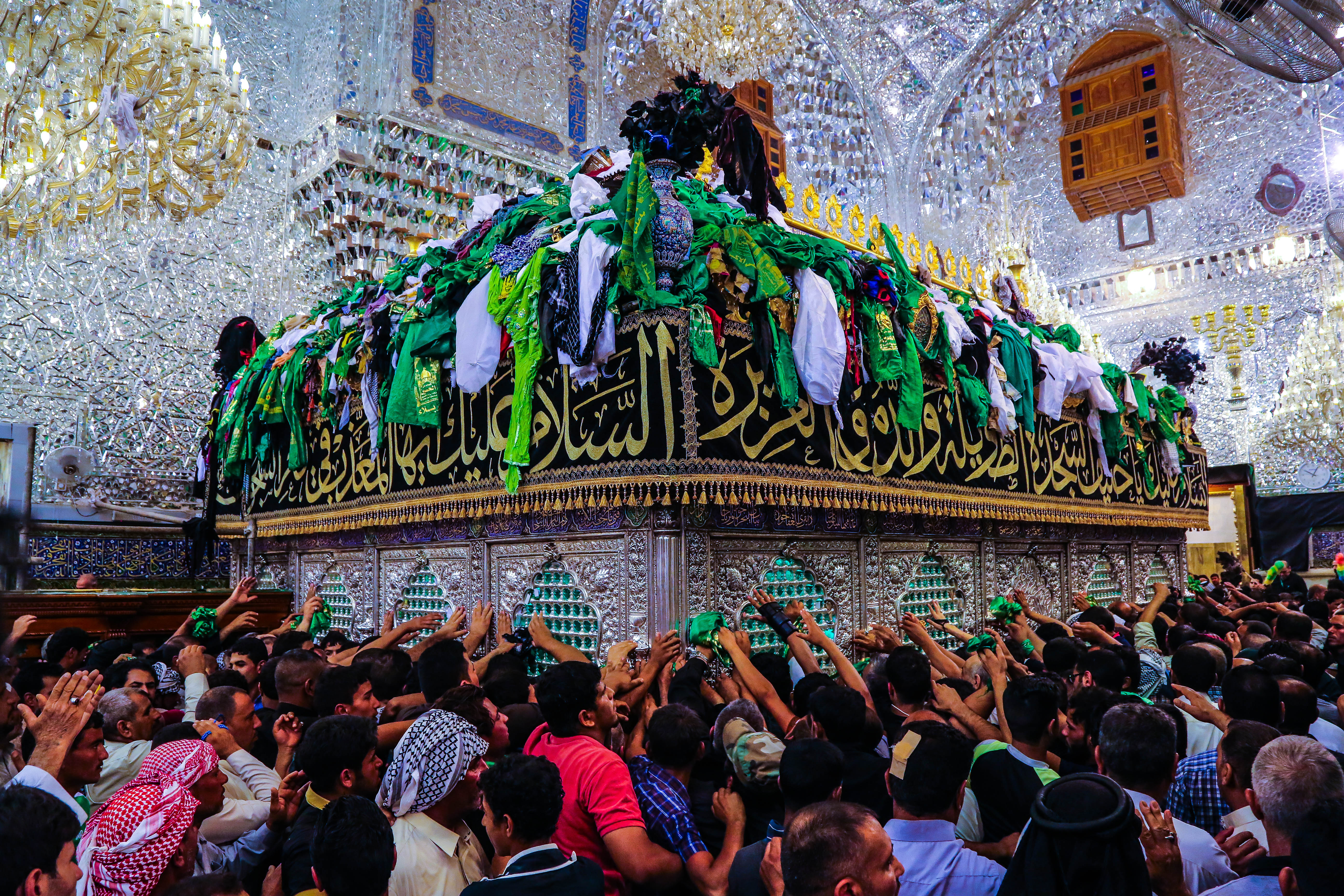
Zarih over the qabr (graves) of al-Kadhim

Repairs to the crumbling structure of the main courtyard of the mosque and its surrounding rooms were carried out in three phases, spanning four months, before the end of 2007. The project entailed the stripping off of the old crumbling walls throughout the courtyard, the addition of various reinforcements to the walls and ceilings, as well as maintenance on the electrical wirings throughout the mosque. Once the inner structure was completed, the floors and walls were then plated in various kinds of marble. Updates to the cooling units of the mosque began in late 2008, and new water filtration units were installed on November 28, 2008.

Construction on the new ladies entrance to the mosque, that is Bāb al-Fāṭimah (Arabic: بَاب ٱلْفَاطِمَة), began in late 2008, along with the construction work for new rooms to the mosque meant for serving refreshments to visitors.

=== Outer structure ===
Among the earliest repairs done to the mosque after the fall of Iraqi President Saddam Hussein in 2003 were repairs done to one of the entrance gates of the mosque known as Bāb al-Qiblah (Arabic: بَاب ٱلْقِبْلَة). The gate and the outer wall had to be entirely refurbished because of the severe neglect they had withstood, and took seven months to complete, having started in early September 2006. The golden dome over the zarih of Muhammad at-Taqī was re-gilded and unveiled to the public in March 2008, during the birthday celebrations of Muhammad and his descendant, Ja'far al-Sadiq. Repair work on the dome over the grave of Mūsā al-Kādhim began in early August 2008, during the birthday ceremonies of Husayn ibn ‘Alī, ‘Abbās ibn ‘Alī, and ‘Alī ibn Husayn.

== Architecture ==
=== Layout and details ===
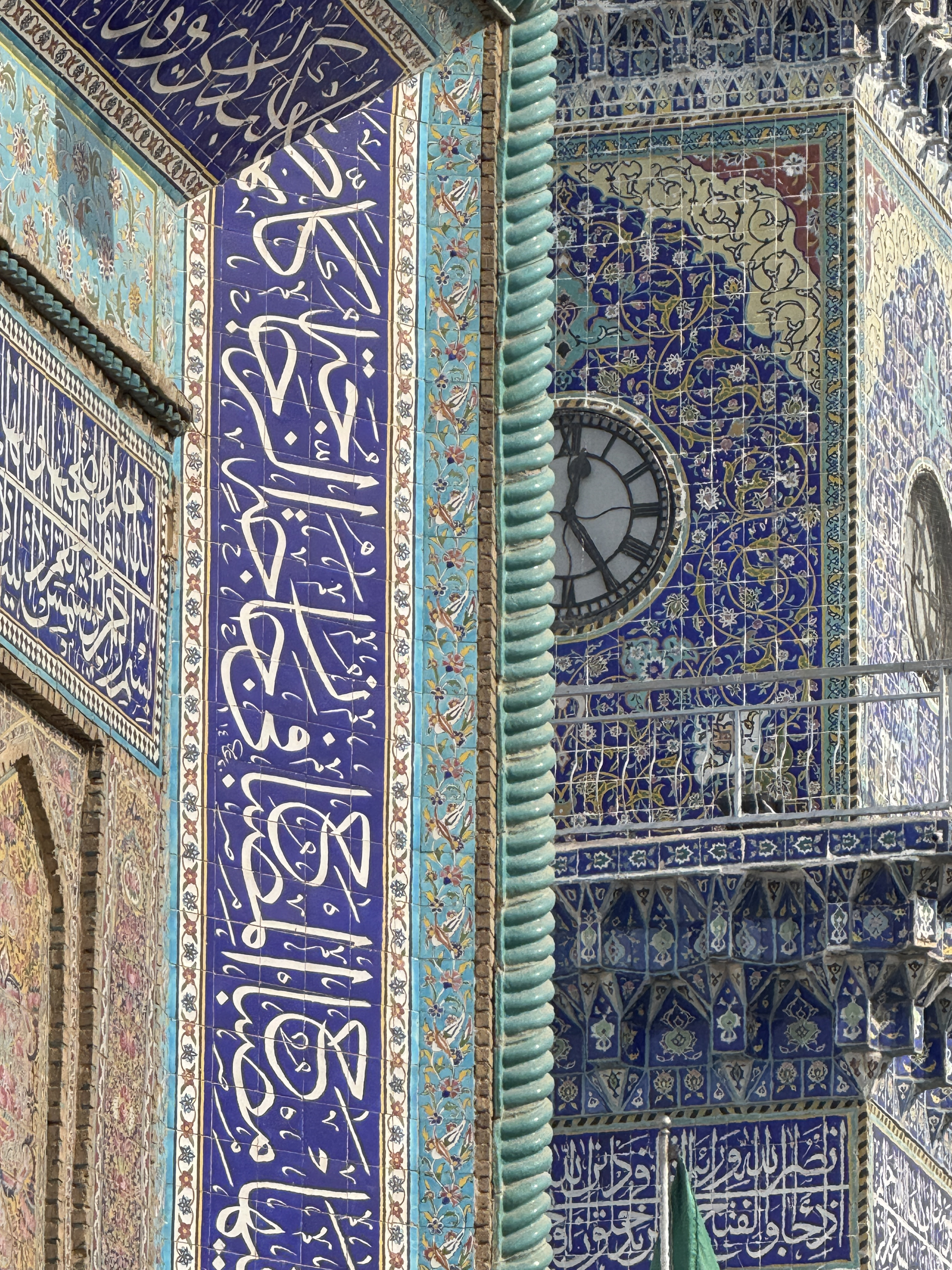
Close-up of the clock tower and the gate to show off the intricate detail work throughout the entrance.

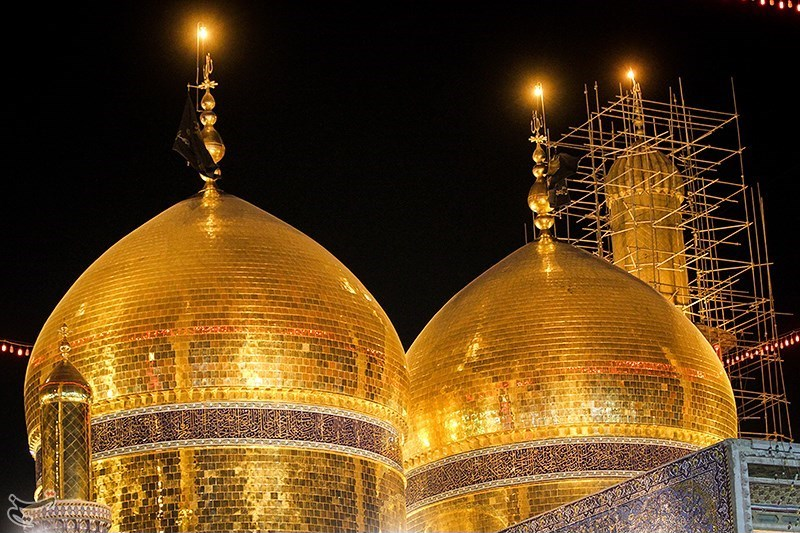
The two main golden domes of the mosque.

The rectangular layout, including its "al-Rawdah," of the mosque has a side length of 140 metres (460 ft) from south to north, and 135 metres (443 ft) from west to east. It contains a sahn, the main mosque, and walls that protect the mosque, consisting of small rooms with gates in the middle of each wall. The walls of the outer mosque also contain half-open iwans and open-rooms for students of religious sciences. The iwans' shape also lightens the weight of the matter, which symbolizes the earth and the sky.

The prayer hall contains two rectangular buildings adjacent to each other and connected with a hallway surrounding the two. The two main shrines are located almost in the center of the layout. The two shrine rooms are connected via a rectangular corridor that connects the two rooms using six doors. The corridor contains niches and alcoves which help reduce the weight and density of the material used in construction. The ceiling of the corridor is lower than the ceiling of the two rooms that contain the shrine which are topped by two domes. The iwans are decorated with various decorations and mirrors used to symbolize paradise.

=== Domes and minarets ===
The mosque has two main domes of equal dimensions and four large minarets, all six coated with gold. The height of the ceiling is 25 metres (82 ft), surmounted by the two domes decorated with Islamic decorations and Qur’anic verses from the inside. From the outside, the two domes are covered with 9,000 bricks of pure gold, and around them are the four minarets, also covered with gold, which rise to 35 metres (115 ft) above the ceiling. Also around the domes are four small minaret-shaped towers that are 4.5 metres (15 ft) high.

== In pop culture ==
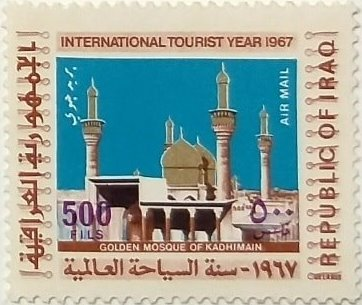
The mosque appearing in a 1967 tourist stamp titled "Golden Mosque of Kadhimain."

Al-Kadhimiya Mosque is considered one of the most iconic landmarks of Iraq, and as such has appeared in several works throughout modern history.

- Several shots of the Kadhimiyya Mosque, including a bird-eye view, were shown in the 1953 British Pathé documentary titled "Ageless Iraq."
- In the 24 issue of Time Magazine, dated 17 June 1957, the minarets of the mosque were featured alongside Iraqi Prime Minister Nuri al-Said on the magazine's cover.
- Issue #427 of The Adventures of Superman takes place in Qurac, a fictional Middle Eastern country. A mosque resembling the Kadhimiyya Mosque is briefly seen on the second page.

== Notable burials ==
- Musa al-Kadhim – 7th Twelver Imam, which the mosque gets its name from
- Muhammad al-Jawad – 9th Twelver Imam, grandson of al-Kadhim
- Al-Shaykh al-Mufid – Muslim scholar and theologian
- Nasir al-Din al-Tusi – Persian polymath, architect, and astronomer
- Al-Sharif al-Radi – Iraqi poet and Islamic Scholar
- Sharif al-Murtaza – Baghdadi Muslim scholar and theologian

== See also ==
- Holiest sites in Shia Islam
- Iraqi art
- List of mosques in Baghdad
- Mesopotamia in the Quran
- Shia Islam in Iraq
