= Ali ibn Asbat =

Abu l-Hasan 'Ali bin Asbat bin Salim Bayya' al-Zutti was one of the Shi'a narrators and companions of Ali al-Rida and Muhammad al-Jawad. He narrated Hadiths from Ali al-Rida, Jamil ibn Darraj, Husayn ibn Zararah, and Muhammad ibn Sinan. People like Musa ibn Ja'far Baghdadi and Muhammad ibn Hussein ibn Abi al-Khattab narrated from him. Ali ibn Asbat was from Kufa.

== Life and family ==
Ali ibn Asbat was a Muhaddith, Moqri and Shia commentator and worked in the clothing business. His father, Asbat ibn Salem was one of the narrators of Ja'far al-Sadiq and Musa al-Kazim. His brother Hussein ibn Asbat was a narrator of Ali al-Ridha and his uncle Yaqub ibn Salem al-Ahmar was considered a reliable and trustworthy narrator. According to the scholars of Rijal, he was one of the companions and narrators of Muhammad al-Jawad. He learned jurisprudence and hadith from Ali al-Ridha. And through the intermediary of al-Sadiq, he has narrated the hadiths of Muhammad. He has narrated about 387 hadiths. His hadiths from Ali al-Ridha are related to various jurisprudential issues, such as certainty, humility, sins, buying and selling, Istikhara prayer, interpretation of some verses, and affordability.

Ali ibn Asbat was a agent of Muhammad al-Jawad in Egypt. An account by the Twelver traditionist Muhammad ibn Ya'qub al-Kulayni (d. 941) describes how Ali ibn Asbat visited Muhammad al-Jawad on behalf of the Egyptian Imamites.

Ibn Asbat narrated hadith from people such as Asbat ibn Salem (his father), Yaqub ibn Salem (his uncle), Abdullah ibn Bakir, Abdullah ibn Sinan, Abdullah ibn al-Mughira, Al-Hasan ibn Ali ibn Faddal, Ali ibn Abi Hamza al-Bata'ini, and many others. Hussein ibn Asbat (his brother), Hasan ibn Musa al-Khashshab, Musa ibn Qasim Bijli, Abd al-Azim al-Hasani and others have narrated narrations from him.

== Belief ==
Ibn Asbat belonged to the Fathi religion and there are two opinions about his change of religion and belief: Some have said that Ali ibn Mahziar wrote a treatise rejecting ibn Asbat religion and called him to the truth, but it was not effective, and he died with the same opinion. Some others say that letters were exchanged between ali ibn Asbat and Ali ibn Mahziar about Ali ibn-Asbat religion until he went to the service of Muhammad al-Javad, and there he changed his Fathite belief. It is stated in more sources that this case is stronger.

== Work ==
His works include: Tafsir al-Qur'an, Al-Dalael, Al-Nawader, Al-Mazar, the comprehensive collection of hadiths and originals. The hadith book was narrated by Zabian ibn Hakim and the original book was narrated by Ibn Abi Umayr. Al-Nawader book is the narration of al-Sheikh Harun ibn Musa on the authority of Abi al-Abbas Ahmad ibn Saeed al-Hamdani.

== Death ==
There is no information about the exact time of Ali ibn Asbat's death, but he was alive until the middle of the third century. He probably died after 230 AD.
