= Muhammad al-Jawad =

Ninth of the Twelve Shia Imams (811–835)

Imam Muhammad al-Jawad Ninth Imam of Twelver Shi'ism
- مُحَمَّدٌ ٱلْجَوَادُ
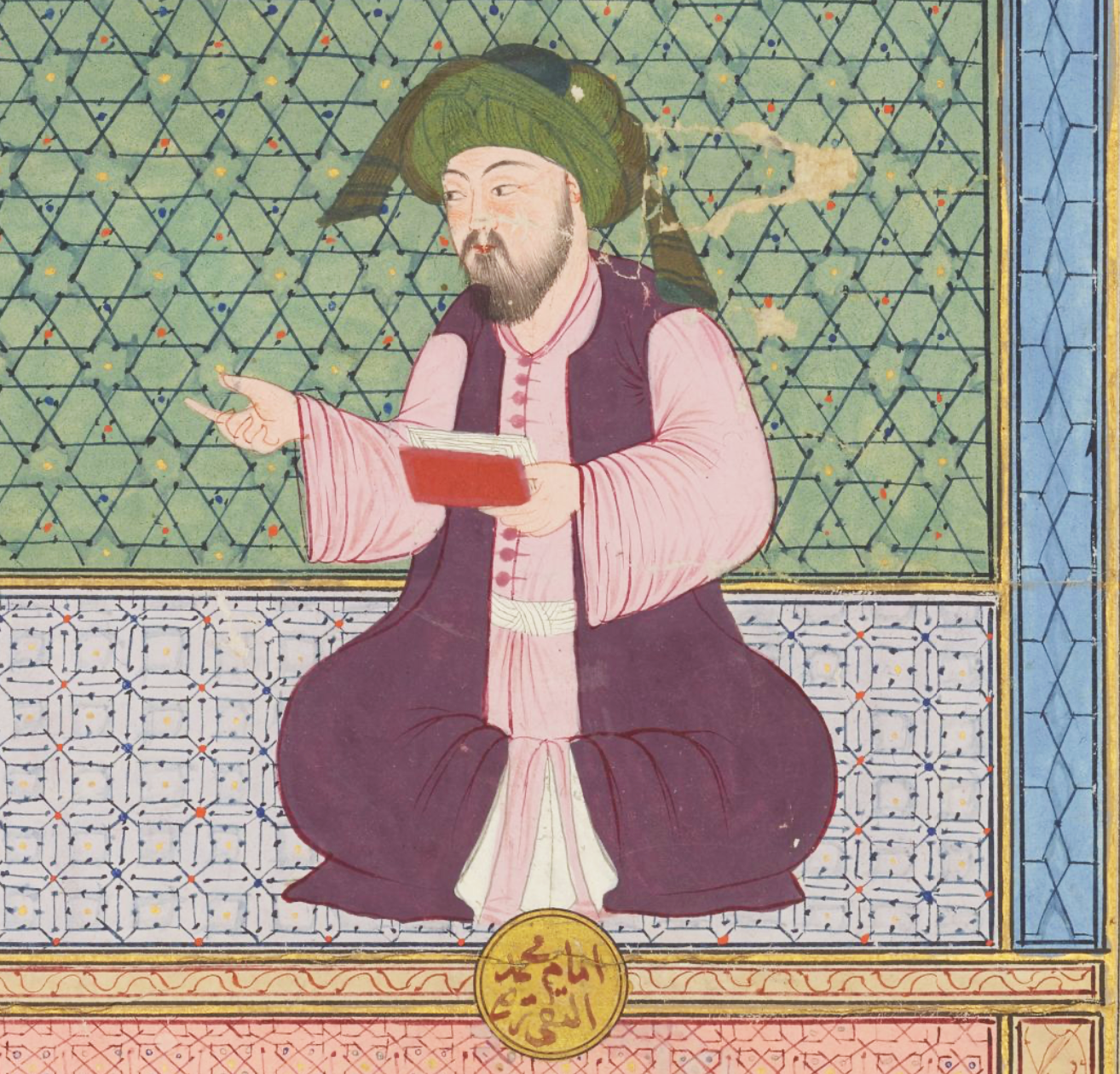
- 16th‑century Ottoman iconographic depiction of Muhammad al‑Jawad

9th Shia Imam
- In office 819–835
- Preceded by: Ali al-Rida
- Succeeded by: Ali al-Hadi
- Title: See list: al-Taqi (lit. 'the pious'); al-Jawad (lit. 'the generous')

Personal life
- Born: c. 8 April 811 (10 Rajab 195 AH) Medina, Abbasid Caliphate
- Died: c. 29 November 835 (aged 24) (29 Dhu'l-Qa'da 220 AH) Baghdad, Abbasid Caliphate
- Cause of death: Poisoning by al-Mu'tasim (most Shia sources)
- Resting place: Al-Kazimiyya Mosque, Baghdad, Iraq; 33°22′48″N 44°20′16.64″E
- Spouse: Samana al-Maghribiyya; Umm al-Fadl bint al-Ma'mun
- Children: Ali al-Hadi; Musa al-Mubarqa'; Hakima
- Parents: Ali al-Rida; Sabika (or Khayzuran)

Religious life
- Religion: Shia Islam

Muhammad ibn Ali al-Jawad (Arabic: مُحَمَّدٌ بْنُ عَلِيٍّ ٱلْجَوَادُ, romanized: Muḥammad ibn ʿAlī al-Jawād, c. 8 April 811 – c. 29 November 835) was a descendant of the Islamic prophet Muhammad and the ninth of the Twelve Imams, succeeding his father, Ali al-Rida (d. 818). He is known by the epithets al-Jawād (Arabic: الجواد, lit. 'the generous') and al-Taqī (Arabic: التقي, lit. 'the pious'). Like most of his predecessors, Muhammad kept aloof from politics and engaged in religious teaching, while organizing the affairs of the Imamite Shia community through a network of representatives (wukalāʾ). The extensive correspondence of al-Jawad with his followers on questions of Islamic law has been preserved in Shia sources and numerous pithy religio-ethical sayings are also attributed to him.

Born in Medina in 810–811, Muhammad al-Jawad was the son of Ali al-Rida, the eighth of the Twelve Imams. In 817, the Abbasid caliph al-Ma'mun (r. 813–833) summoned al-Rida to Khorasan and designated him as the heir apparent, possibly to mitigate the frequent Shia revolts. This appointment provoked strong opposition in Iraq, which forced al-Ma'mun to return to the capital Baghdad in 818 and abandon his pro-Shia policies. On the way back to Baghdad, al-Rida suddenly fell ill and died in Tus, likely poisoned by order of al-Ma'mun as he made concessions to the opposition. Upon the death of al-Rida in 818, the succession of his only son Muhammad to the imamate at the age of about seven became controversial. Most Imamite Shias accepted the imamate of al-Jawad because the Imam, in their view, received his perfect religious knowledge through divine inspiration, irrespective of his age. At the time, some instead turned for leadership to al-Jawad's uncle, Ahmad ibn Musa al-Kazim, and some others joined the Waqifites, but the succession of al-Jawad evidently did not create any permanent divisions in the Shia community. Twelver sources often justify the imamate of the young al-Jawad by drawing parallels with Jesus and John the Baptist, both of whom in the Quran received their prophetic missions in childhood.

In 830, al-Jawad was summoned to Baghdad by al-Ma'mun, who married his daughter Umm Fadhl to the former. This marriage, however, was to be without issue and might have been infelicitous. His successor, Ali al-Hadi, was already born in 828 to Samana, a freed slave (umm walad). In 833, al-Ma'mun died and was succeeded by his brother, al-Mu'tasim (r. 833–842), who summoned al-Jawad to Baghdad in 835 and hosted him and his wife, possibly to investigate any links between al-Jawad and new Shia revolts. There al-Jawad died in the same year at the age of about twenty-five. All major Sunni sources are silent about the manner of his death, while Shia authorities are nearly unanimous that he was poisoned by his disaffected wife, Umm al-Fadl, at the instigation of her uncle, al-Mu'tasim. Muhammad al-Jawad was buried next to his grandfather, Musa al-Kazim, the seventh of the Twelve Imams, in the cemetery of the Quraysh, where the Kazimayn shrine was later erected. Kazimayn has since become an important center for pilgrimage.

== Titles ==
Muhammad ibn Ali, the ninth of the Twelve Imams, is occasionally known in Shia sources as al-Taqi (Arabic: التقى, lit. 'the pious'), but more commonly as al-Jawad (Arabic: الجواد, lit. 'the generous') for his munificence. The Imam is cited in the Shia hadith literature as Abu Ja'far al-Thani (Arabic: ابو جعفر الثاني, lit. 'Abu Ja'far, the second'), with the title Abu Ja'far reserved for his predecessor, Muhammad al-Baqir (d. 732), the fifth of the Twelve Imams. His kunya is Abu Ali (Arabic: ابو علي), though he was also known by his contemporaries as Ibn al-Rida (Arabic: ابن الرضا, lit. 'son of al-Rida') because he was the only child of Ali al-Rida.

== Life ==
=== Birth (c. 810) ===
Muhammad al-Jawad was born in Medina, or in a village near Medina founded by his grandfather, Musa al-Kazim (d. 799). Sources seem to agree that he was born 195 AH (810–811) but the exact date is disputed. Most Twelver sources record mid-Ramadan 195 AH (mid-June 811) as the birthday of Muhammad but Ibn Ayyas (d. 1522/1524) favors 10 Rajab 195 AH (8 April 811). This latter date agrees with Ziyarat al-Nahiya al-Muqaddasa, a supplication attributed to Muhammad al-Mahdi, the last of the Twelve Imams. It is this date that the Shia celebrate annually. His father Ali al-Rida, the eighth of the Twelve Imams, was a descendant of Ali ibn Abi Talib (d. 661) and Fatima (d. 632), who were the cousin and the daughter of the Islamic prophet Muhammad, respectively. Most records agree that the mother of Muhammad al-Jawad was a freed slave (umm walad) from Nubia, though her name is given differently in sources as Sabika or Durra (sometimes Khayzuran). She might have belonged to the family of Maria al-Qibtiyya, a freed slave of the prophet and the mother of his son Ibrahim, who died in childhood.

=== Reign of al-Ma'mun (r. 813–833) ===
==== Marriage (c. 817) ====
Muhammad stayed behind in Medina when his father al-Rida traveled to Merv in Khorasan at the request of the Abbasid caliph al-Ma'mun (r. 813–833). The caliph designated al-Rida as the heir apparent in 202 AH (817), and also changed the official Abbasid color of black to green, possibly to signify this reconciliation between the Abbasids and the Alids. To form a political alliance, the caliph also married one of his daughters, named Umm Habib, to al-Rida in 202 AH (817) and promised another daughter, named Umm al-Fadl, to Muhammad, who was still a minor at the time, aged about seven. Among Sunni historians, al-Tabari (d. 923), Ibn Abi Tahir Tayfur (d. 893), and Ibn al-Athir al-Jazari (d. 1232–1233) agree on this report. It is likely that Muhammad was absent from the ceremony, even though Abu'l-Hasan Bayhaqi (d. 1169) relates that he visited his father in Merv in 202 AH (817). In contrast, the Sunni historian al-Khatib al-Baghdadi (d. 1071) and the Shia-leaning historians Al-Masudi (d. 956) and Ya'qubi (d. 897–898) place the betrothal of Muhammad after the death of al-Rida in 204 AH (819), following the return of al-Ma'mun to his capital Baghdad. In particular, al-Mas'udi in his Ithbat al-wassiya writes that al-Ma'mun summoned Muhammad to Baghdad, settled him near his palace, and later decided to marry him to his daughter, Umm Fadl, whose given name was Zaynab. According to al-Baghdadi, Muhammad was about nine years old at the time of this betrothal.

==== Death of his father (c. 818) ====
Ali al-Rida was a prominent Alid, a descendant of Ali ibn Abi Talib, the cousin and son-in-law of Muhammad. The Alids were viewed as rivals for the caliphate by the Abbasids, who were the descendants of Abbas ibn Abd al-Muttalib, a paternal uncle of Muhammad. The appointment of the Alid al-Rida by the Abbasid caliph thus invoked strong opposition, particularly among the members of the Abbasid dynasty and the Iraqi supporters of Abbasid legitimism. These revolted and installed al-Ma'mun's uncle, Ibrahim ibn al-Mahdi, as an anti-caliph in Baghdad. The caliph and his entourage thus left Khorasan for Baghdad in 203 AH (818), accompanied by al-Rida. The latter died shortly in Tus after a brief illness, possibly after being poisoned. The death of al-Rida followed the assassination of al-Fadl ibn Sahl (d. 818), the Persian vizier of al-Ma'mun, who had become a divisive figure. Both deaths are linked in Shia sources to al-Ma'mun and viewed as concessions to the Arab party to smooth his return to Iraq. Modern scholars similarly tend to suspect the caliph in the death of al-Rida. After returning to Baghdad in 204 AH (819), al-Ma'mun reversed his pro-Shia policies, and restored the traditional black color of the Abbasids. Muhammad was about seven years old when his father died. There are multiple Shia reports that he told others about the death of his father before the news arrived in Medina, and some traditions indicate that he was miraculously present in the burial of al-Rida in Khurasan and prayed over his body.

==== Summoned to Baghdad (c. 819) ====
Soon after arriving in Baghdad in 204 AH (819), al-Ma'mun summoned the young Muhammad who then stayed at the court of the caliph. The betrothal of Muhammad and Umm Fadl or its proposal was apparently opposed by some of the Abbasids, reportedly because of the dark complexion of Muhammad. An account of their protests appears in the biographical Kitab al-Irshad by the Twelver theologian Al-Shaykh al-Mufid (d. 1022), though the Islamicist Shona F. Wardrop suspects that it may actually refer to the designation of al-Rida as the heir apparent. In any case, al-Mufid suggests that the opposition actually feared the political rise of Muhammad similar to his father al-Rida, and the view of the Islamicist Wilferd Madelung is similar. Those opposed to the marriage arranged for a public debate where the chief judge Yahya ibn Aktam interrogated the young Muhammad with difficult theological questions to which he answered correctly. An account of this is given by al-Mas'udi, but the seventeenth-century hadith collection Bihar al-Anwar adds that Yahya also presented Muhammad with provocative questions about the status of the early caliphs Abu Bakr (r. 632–634) and Umar (r. 634–644), including an alleged prophetic tradition that compares the two caliphs with the archangels Gabriel and Michael. These claims al-Jawad refuted in mild language. The attribution of this latter exchange to Muhammad al-Jawad is, however, uncertain since a similar exchange between al-Ma'mun and some Sunni scholars is described by the tenth-century hadith collection Uyoun Akhbar Al-Ridha. At any rate, it is at the end of this assembly that al-Ma'mun formally married his daughter to Muhammad, according to al-Mas'udi and al-Mufid. This episode is thus viewed by the Twelvers as evidence of the exceptional knowledge of Muhammad al-Jawad.

Kitab al-Irshad implies that Muhammad returned to Medina after this episode in Baghdad. By some accounts, however, he stayed in Baghdad for about eight years, primarily engaged in teaching, before returning to Medina with his family after the death of al-Ma'mun in 218 AH (833). This is viewed as house arrest by the historian Jassim M. Hussain, citing a report by al-Mas'udi. There is not much known about this period of his life.

==== Summoned to Baghdad (830) ====
The marriage of al-Jawad to the daughter of the caliph was consummated in 215 AH (830), when al-Ma'mun invited the former to Baghdad from Medina. The couple stayed there until the Hajj season (January 831) when they returned to Medina after completing the Hajj ritual. Possibly hoping to blunt the Shia opposition through al-Jawad, the caliph is said to have displayed much affection towards the young man. By marrying his daughter to al-Jawad, the Twelver scholar Muhammad Husayn Tabatabai (d. 1981) suggests that al-Ma'mun might have wanted to keep a close watch on him from both outside and within his household. Hussain similarly suggests that al-Ma'mun intended to monitor al-Jawad and divide the Shia opposition, hoping thus to mitigate their revolts, including some fresh uprisings in Qom. This view is rejected by the historian Moojan Momen, who says that al-Ma'mun might have had little to fear from the revolts in Qom. Medoff believes that al-Ma'mun pursued a policy of simultaneously appeasing and containing pro-Alid groups, while Wardrop writes that the marriage was intended to discourage the Shia from revolution. Hussain and Esmail Baghestani say that the marriage did not win the Shia support for al-Ma'mun, nor did it stop the Shia revolts.

=== Reign of al-Mu'tasim (r. 833–842) ===
Caliph al-Ma'mun died in 218 AH (833) and was succeeded by his brother, al-Mu'tasim, who continued the policy of his predecessor in simultaneously appeasing and containing pro-Alid groups, according to Medoff. It was perhaps to further this policy that al-Mu'tasim summoned al-Jawad to Baghdad in 220 AH (835) and hosted him and his wife. The departure of al-Jawad was apparently facilitated by Abd al-Malik al-Zayyat at the behest of the caliph. An exception here is the account of al-Mas'udi which does not explicitly state that al-Jawad was summoned by al-Mu'tasim. At any rate, al-Jawad died there in the same year, some ten months after his arrival, at the age of about twenty-five. During this short window, Shia sources accuse al-Mu'tasim of multiple attempts to discredit al-Jawad and finally murdering him. This alleged hostility of al-Mu'tasim may have been compounded by a recent wave of Shia revolts in Qom and in Taliqan, even though there is no evidence that al-Jawad was involved in them. One such attempt against al-Jawad was prevented by one of his supporters, Ahmad ibn Hammad al-Marwazi, who was nevertheless an advisor to Ibn Abi Dawud, the influential qadi. The caliph apparently abandoned his plan to dishonor al-Jawad by parading him while intoxicated after Ahmad convinced the qadi about the futility of this plan, saying that the ire of the caliph would only strengthen the loyalty of Imamites for al-Jawad. The qadi passed on the advice to the caliph. A different account by Ibn Awrama, quoted in Bihar al-anwar and Manaqib, describes how al-Jawad unmasked false witnesses who had accused him of plotting against the caliph, though the miraculous ending of this account weakens its historical weight. Another account is narrated by Zurqan, a sahib of the qadi Ibn Abi Dawud: The caliph is said to have solicited and preferred the judicial ruling of al-Jawad about amputating the hand of a thief in the presence of other scholars. This infuriated the qadi, who later visited the caliph and warned him about inadvertently bolstering the public support for al-Jawad as an alternative to al-Mu'tasim. This then set in motion the plot to poison al-Jawad.

=== Personal life ===
Similar to his predecessors, al-Jawad lived modestly and gave to the poor generously, according to Dwight M. Donaldson (d. 1976). Baghestani adds that al-Jawad gave charity at the beginning of every month and interceded with the officials on behalf of the people. His arranged marriage in 215 AH (830) to Umm al-Fadl did not result in any children. There are other indications that this marriage was not particularly felicitous, including reports that she complained to al-Ma'mun about her marriage, specifically about her husband taking a concubine, but the caliph rejected her complaint. Umm al-Fadl is also commonly held responsible in Shia sources for the death of al-Jawad in 220 AH (835) by poisoning. Ali al-Hadi, the successor of al-Jawad, was born to Samana, a freed slave (umm walad) of Maghrebian (North African) origin, circa 212 AH (828). Other children of al-Jawad were Musa al-Mubarqa' and two or four daughters. In some genealogical books, other sons have been named but there is no mention of them in the earliest sources. The daughters of al-Jawad are named differently in the sources. Here, al-Mufid gives the names Fatima and Amama, while the biographical source Dala'il al-imama lists Khadija, Hakima, and Umm Kulthum. The Sunni theologian Fakhr Razi (d. 1209) adds Behjat and Barihe to these names, saying that none of them left any descendants. The children of al-Jawad were all born to Samana.

== Death ==
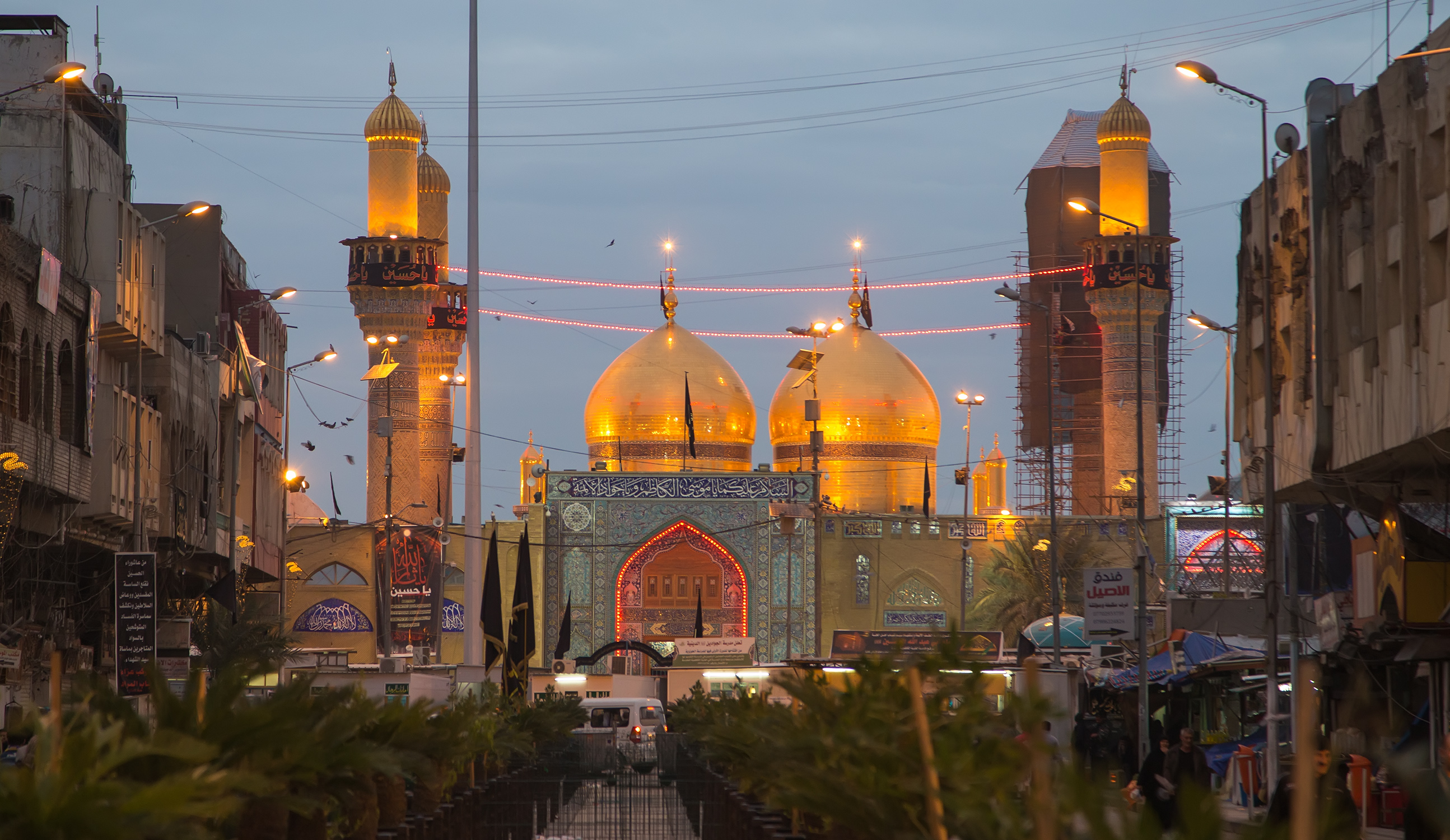
The Kazimayn shrine, where al-Jawad is buried

Muhammad al-Jawad died on 6 Dhu'l-Hijja 220 AH (30 November 835) in Baghdad, after arriving there in Muharram 220 (January 835) at the request of al-Mu'tasim, who hosted him and his wife during the visit. He died at the age of about twenty-five, the youngest among the Twelve Imams. All major Sunni sources are silent about the cause of his death, including those by al-Tabari, al-Baghdadi, and Ibn al-Athir. Among medieval Sunni authors, an exception is Ibn al-Sabbagh, who accepts the possibility of murder. In contrast, Shia sources hold the Abbasids responsible in the deaths of multiple Shia Imams, including al-Jawad. In his case, Shia sources are nearly unanimous that he was murdered at the instigation of al-Mu'tasim. The silence of Sunni sources here is attributed by the Shia to the atmosphere of fear and intimidation under the Abbasids. In particular, Ibn Shahrashub said that he wrote his Manaqib Ale Abi Talib "to bring forth what they [the Sunnis] have suppressed." An exception here is al-Mufid who does not find the evidence for murder credible. Among other sources, Ithbat al-wassiya attributes a hadith to al-Rida, childless at the time, in which he apparently predicts the birth of his son al-Jawad and his murder.

While the manner of his death is given differently by Shia authors, most say that al-Jawad was poisoned by his disaffected wife Umm al-Fadl, at the instigation of her uncle al-Mu'tasim. These include the Shia-leaning historian al-Mas'udi, and Twelver scholars Ibn Jarir al-Tabari al-Saghir, (Note: The book in question is Dala'il al-imama, though its attribution to the eleventh-century Twelver scholar al-Tabari al-Saghir is disputed.) Mohammad-Baqer Majlesi (d. 1699), Abbas Qomi (d. 1941), and Tabatabai. The Twelver scholar Shaykh Tabarsi (d. 1153) does not have a verdict but mentions the prevalent Shia view that al-Jawad was poisoned. Sunni sources typically say that Umm al-Fadl was present in Baghdad when her husband died. Citing the Sunni historian al-Baghdadi and some others, Baghestani writes that she joined the harem of al-Mu'tasim after the death of al-Jawad. He was buried next to his grandfather, Musa al-Kazim, the seventh of the Twelve Imams, in the cemetery of the Quraysh on the west bank of Tigris, where the Kazimayn shrine was later erected. Kazimayn has become an important center for pilgrimage.

== Imamate ==
=== Designation as the Imam ===
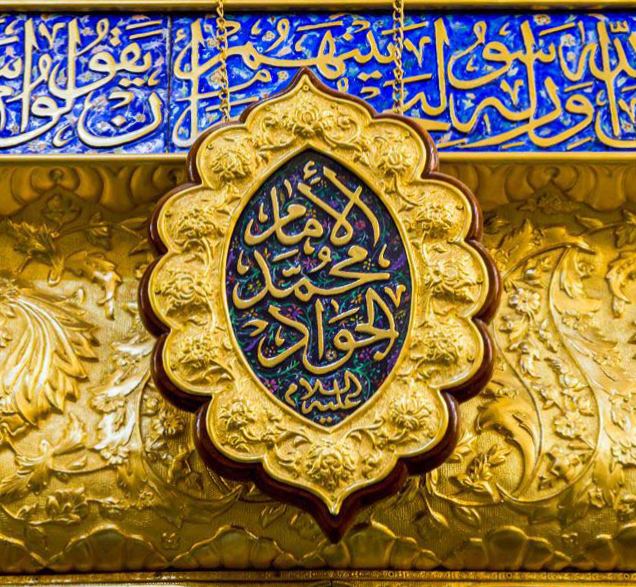
Calligraphic inscription of al-Jawad's name on the zarih of Husayn ibn Ali, located in Karbala

Muhammad al-Jawad was about seven years old when his father al-Rida died in 203 AH (818). Even as the only child of al-Rida, the succession of the young Muhammad to the imamate became controversial, but did not result in permanent divisions of the Shia community. At the time, al-Mas'udi notes the confusion (hayra) among the Imamite Shias about the qualifications of the young al-Jawad for the imamate. As related by al-Mas'udi and Majlesi, several supporters of al-Rida thus gathered in Baghdad at the house of Abd al-Rahman ibn al-Hajjaj, a distinguished companion of the three previous Imams, namely, Ja'far al-Sadiq (d. 765), al-Kazim, and al-Rida. Of those present, Yunus ibn Abd al-Rahman reportedly suggested they choose a temporary leader until al-Jawad reached adulthood. But the view that prevailed was that adulthood is not a prerequisite for wisdom. There is also the account in Ithbat al-wasiyya and elsewhere, saying that the prominent Shias from across the empire tested the young al-Jawad during the Hajj season and their doubts about him were dispelled. There are also reports about the direct or indirect designation (nass) of al-Jawad as the next imam by his predecessor. These are often narrated by the inner circle of al-Rida, thus signifying their visible role in consolidating the imamate of the young al-Jawad. An example of indirect designation is the statement referring to the young al-Jawad as "the greatest blessing for the Shia," ascribed to al-Rida in the canonical Kitab al-Irshad and other sources. Elsewhere when al-Husayn ibn al-Qiayama questioned the imamate of al-Rida for his lack of an heir at the time, he responded that he would have a son to succeed him.

According to Wardrop, as the only son of al-Rida, recognition of al-Jawad as the heir to the imamate was to be expected, adding that there is considerable evidence in the hadith literature against the horizontal transference of the imamate between brothers after Hasan ibn Ali (d. 670) and Husayn ibn Ali (d. 680), the second and third of the Twelve Imams. Wardrop points out that there were very few qualified alternatives to al-Jawad anyway, naming his uncles, Ahmad ibn Musa and Abdallah ibn Musa, and also a different Hasanid with the latter name. That there was no clear alternative to al-Jawad is also the view of the Muslim jurist Hossein Modarressi. The attention al-Jawad received from al-Ma'mun, who married him to his daughter, may have also strengthened the case for al-Jawad. Wardrop thus concludes that the main challenge to the imamate of al-Jawad was his young age, given that the imamate was viewed by the Shia as the ultimate source of knowledge (ilm) and guidance. A group of followers of al-Rida thus accepted the imamate of his brother, Ahmad ibn Musa, who had earlier rivaled al-Rida. Another group joined the Waqifites, who considered al-Kazim to be the last Imam and expected his return as Mahdi, the promised savior in Islam. Some of these apparently argued that their imam could not be a child. According to Madelung, some others, who had opportunistically backed the imamate of al-Rida after his appointment as the heir apparent, had now returned to their Sunni or Zaydi communities.

==== Precedents ====
As for precedents, there were no child imams before al-Jawad, even though Ali ibn Abi Talib professed Islam at the age of about ten, and Hasan and Husayn formally pledged their allegiance to the prophet when they were about six. Imamite authors have noted that Jesus received his prophetic mission in the Quran when he was still a child, suggesting that al-Jawad also received the requisite perfect knowledge of all religious matters through divine inspiration from the time of his succession, irrespective of his age. Similar statements are also attributed to al-Rida, "This [his age] does not harm him [al-Jawad], Isa [Jesus] became God's hujja (lit. 'proof') when he was three years old." The related Quranic verse 19:12 includes, "We gave him John the Baptist hukm (lit. 'wisdom') as a child." Even so, some among the Shia still debated as to whether the young Imam was equal to an adult Imam in every aspect, as evidenced by some reports in heresiographies and in al-Maqalat by al-Mufid. The latter reports that some proposed that the "pious men with religious and legal knowledge" should lead until al-Jawad matured. However, the prevailing answer was that both adult and minor Imams are equal since both receive their knowledge from supernatural sources. Indeed, there already were traditions attributed to earlier Imams asserting that each Imam would inherit the full knowledge of his predecessor upon his death.

=== Network of representatives ===
To organize the affairs of a growing Shia population, which had expanded far to the east of Iraq and Arabia, the young al-Jawad relied heavily on his representatives or agents (wukalāʾ, sing. wakīl) throughout the empire. This underground network of agents across the Abbasid empire was founded by his grandfather al-Kazim (d. 799) and maintained by his son al-Rida. There is even some evidence that an early network existed under al-Sadiq (d. 765). This network guided the financial and religious affairs of the Imamite Shias. After the death of al-Rida, it took possibly up to four years for the imamate of al-Jawad to consolidate. In this period of uncertainty, the network of wukalāʾ likely continued to function, but did so more independently than ever before. Wardrop suggests that this level of autonomy continued throughout the childhood of al-Jawad. After al-Rida, some agents remained loyal to his successor, possibly after testing him during the Hajj season. These included Abd al-Aziz ibn al-Muhtadi, Ayyub ibn Nuh, and Yahya ibn Abi Imran. Some others did not, including perhaps Safwan ibn Yahya, Muhammad ibn Sinan, Zakariyya ibn Adam, and Sa'd ibn Sa'd. There are conflicting reports about these four and whether they withheld their collected alms from al-Jawad, but some of them are said to have later returned to the Imam. Because of the relative isolation of al-Jawad by the Abbasids, the Imamite Shias normally communicated with their Imam through his agents, except during Hajj when they met directly with him.

During al-Jawad's imamate, Shia activists were dispatched to Egypt and elsewhere, as reported by the Twelver traditionist Ahmad ibn Ali al-Najashi (d. 1058). They were apparently successful and an account by the Twelver traditionist Muhammad ibn Ya'qub al-Kulayni (d. 941) describes how Ali ibn Asbat visited al-Jawad on behalf of the Egyptian Imamites. Among the agents of al-Jawad were Ali ibn Mahziar Ahvazi in Ahvaz, Ibrahim ibn Muhammad Hamdani in Hamedan, Yahya ibn Abi Imran in Rayy, Yunus ibn Abdulrahman and Abu Amr al-Hadhdha' in Basra, Ali ibn Hasan W'aseti in Baghdad, Ali ibn Asbat in Egypt, Safwan ibn Yahya in Kufa, Saleh Ibn Muhammad Ibn Sahl and Zakaria ibn Adam Ash'ari Qomi in Qom. In addition to these agents, al-Jawad sometimes sent special representatives to cities to collect religious taxes, including Khums. Some followers of al-Jawad received permission to work within the Abbasid government for the benefit of the Shia community. These included Muhammad ibn Isma'il ibn Baz'i and Ahmad ibn al-Hamza al-Qomi in the vizierate, Husayn ibn Abd-Allah al-Neishaburi, the ruler of Bost and Sistan, Hakam ibn Alia' al-Asadi, the ruler of Bahrain, and Nuh ibn Darraj, the qadi of Baghdad and then Kufa. Some of these figures are now known to have secretly paid their Khums to al-Jawad. Towards the end of al-Jawad's life, the organization and activities of his agents further expanded. Some of his followers became integrated within the Abbasid army, while he announced his successor, Ali al-Hadi, through his main agent, Muhammad ibn al-Faraj, or through another companion, Abu al-Khayrani.

==== Role in Shia revolts ====
Muhammad al-Jawad adopted a quiescent attitude and kept aloof from politics, similar to many of his predecessors. Nevertheless, Hussain links the 210 AH (825) uprising in Qom to the political activities of al-Jawad's agents, even though the Imamite sources are silent about any military involvement of his underground organization. Prior to this revolt, residents of Qom, a rising Shia center, had called on al-Ma'mun to lower their taxes as he had done for the city of Rayy. The caliph rejected their appeal, then suppressed their subsequent revolt, and substantially raised their taxes. This is detailed by the Twelver traditionist Ibn Shahrashub (d. 1192), who writes that the Abbasid army demolished the wall surrounding the city, killed many, and nearly quadrupled the taxes. Among those killed was a prominent participant in the uprising, named Yahya ibn Imran, who might have been a representative (wakīl) of Muhammad al-Jawad. The attitude of al-Jawad towards this uprising, however, remains unclear, as the Imamite sources are silent about this uprising and its connection to al-Jawad or lack thereof. Probably connecting al-Jawad to Shia rebellions, al-Ma'mun summoned the former from Medina to Baghdad in 215 AH (830) and married his daughter Umm Fazl to him. This marriage, however, did not win al-Ma'mun the Shia support, nor did it stop the uprisings in Qom. Indeed, some reports by al-Tabari and Ibn al-Athir add that among the rebel leaders who had been exiled to Egypt, Ja'far ibn Dawud al-Qomi later escaped and rose again in Qom, defeating the Abbasid army in 216 AH. The Shia uprisings continued even after his execution in 217 AH by the Abbasids. After succeeding al-Ma'mun, al-Mu'tasim summoned al-Jawad to Baghdad in 220 AH (835) and held him under close surveillance, probably to ascertain his role in the Shia uprisings.

=== Companions and narrators of hadith ===
Shaykh Tusi (d. 1067) has listed one hundred and sixteen narrators of hadith from al-Jawad, though only a few of them were his trusted companions, including Ali ibn Mahziar Ahvazi, Abu Hashim Dawud ibn al-Qasim al-Ja'fari, Abd al-Azim al-Hasani, Ahmad ibn Muhammad al-Bazanti, Ali ibn Asbat Kufi, Uthman ibn Sa'id al-Asadi, and Amro ibn Firat. In particular, Ibn Mahziar was the agent of al-Jawad in Ahvaz and wrote two books, namely, Kitab al-Malahim and Kitab al-Qa'im, about occultation, which is the eschatological belief that Mahdi, a descendant of the Islamic prophet Muhammad, has already been born and subsequently concealed from the public. The two sons of Ibn Mahziar, named Ibrahim and Muhammad, later served as the representatives of the twelfth Imam in Ahvaz. The Imam distanced himself from the Ghulat (lit. 'exaggerators') who believed in the divinity of Imams. Among them were Abu l-Khattab, Abu al-Samhari, and Ibn Abi Zarqa, who are said to have defamed Shia by forging traditions and attributing them to the Imams and introducing themselves as their representatives.

=== Karamat ===
In Shia sources, al-Jawad is credited with some karamat (sing. karamah), that is, supernatural acts or miracles sometimes attributed to saints in Islam. These include speaking at the time of his birth, tay al-ard (teleportation in Islamic mysticism) from Medina to Khorasan for the burial of his father al-Rida, miraculously healing the sick, fulfillment of his prayers for friends and against his enemies, informing about the inner secrets of people, predicting future events, and particularly his death. These are often cited by the Shia as proof of his imamate. A subtle story of this kind in Bihar al-Anwar and Kitab al-Kafi is told on the authority of Abd-Allah ibn Razin. When visiting the Imam, he decided to gather some of the earth upon which al-Jawad had set foot, a desire that he later deemed sinful. However, his attempts to tactfully do so were all thwarted by al-Jawad, who subtly changed his daily routines. This continued to the point that it surprised the attendant of Imam and let Abd-Allah realize that al-Jawad was aware of his sinful determination. It was only after Abd-Allah resolved to give up that al-Jawad returned to his usual routine.

=== Successor ===
After the death of al-Jawad in 220 AH (835), the majority of his followers acknowledged the imamate of his son Ali, later to be known by the epithets al-Hadi (lit. 'the guide') and al-Naqi (lit. 'the distinguished'). Similar to his father, Ali was also a minor when he succeeded him in 220 AH (835) at the age of about seven. The will attributed to al-Jawad in Kitab al-Kafi stipulates that Ali would inherit from him and be responsible for his younger brother, Musa, and his sisters. Muhammad al-Jawad is also said to have announced the succession of Ali through his main agent, Muhammad ibn al-Faraj, or through Abu al-Khayrani. This messenger relayed the designation to the assembly of companions after the death of al-Jawad and the majority there is reported to have agreed on the imamate of Ali al-Hadi.

== Legacy ==
Muhammad al-Jawad was engaged in teaching during his eight years in Baghdad, and he was renowned for his public defense of Islamic tradition, according to Edward D.A. Hulmes. His extensive correspondence with his followers on questions of Islamic law (fiqh) about marriage, divorce, and inheritance has been preserved in Shia sources. Ali al-Rida is even said to have praised his son for writing "extremely elegant" letters while still a young boy. According to Hamid Mavani, most Shia hadiths about Khums (Islamic alms, lit. 'one-fifth') are attributed to al-Jawad and his successor, al-Hadi. Mavani regards Khums as an example of the Imams' discretionary authority as Shia leaders, which in this case countered the redirection of Zakat (another Islamic alms) to sustain oppressive regimes and support the affluent lifestyle of caliphs. Among the Shia, the titles al-Qa'im (lit. 'he who will rise') and less frequently al-Mahdi refer to the messianic figure in Islam. This apparently created confusion and al-Jawad is reported to have identified the two, saying that Qa'im Al Muhammad is the last Imam and that he would be al-Mahdi. Verses 81:15–16, "O, but I call to witness the planets, the stars which rise and set," were also interpreted by al-Jawad and his predecessor al-Baqir as referring to the reappearance of al-Mahdi, thus likening him to a shooting star in the dark night. Musnad al-imam al-Jawad lists the collections of hadith that contain the sermons and sayings attributed to al-Jawad, including al-Tazkirat al-Hamdouniya by the Sunni scholar Ibn Hamdan (d. 1295). Among many pithy religio-ethical sayings attributed to al-Jawad, Donaldson quotes a few:

- Muhammad al-Jawad related from Ali ibn Abi Talib that, once when the prophet sent him to Yemen, he said to him, "O Ali, he is never disappointed who asks for good (from God), and He never has a motive for repenting who asks (His) advice."
- Muhammad al-Jawad reported that the prophet had said to Ali, "Rise betimes in the name of God, for God hath bestowed a blessing on my people in their early rising."
- "Whosoever gaineth for himself a brother in God, hath gained for himself a mansion in Paradise."
- Muhammad al-Jawad related from the prophet, "Make it a point to travel by night, for more ground can be got over by night than by day."

== See also ==
- The Twelve Imams
- Kazimayn shrine
- Holiest sites in Islam (Shia)
- al-Ma'mun
- al-Mu'tasim

== Bibliography ==
- Baghestani, Esmail (2014). "Jawad, Imam". Encyclopaedia of the World of Islam (in Persian). Vol. 11. Encyclopaedia Islamica Foundation. ISBN 9789644470127.
- Bayhom-Daou, Tamima (2009). "ʿAlī Al-Riḍā". In Fleet, Kate; Krämer, Gudrun; Matringe, Denis; Nawas, John; Rowson, Everett (eds.). Encyclopaedia of Islam (Third ed.). doi:10.1163/1573-3912_ei3_COM_22933. ISBN 9789004181304.
- Bobrick, Benson (2012). The Caliph's Splendor - Islam and the West in the Golden Age of Baghdad. Simon & Schuster. ISBN 9781416568063.
- Cooperson, Michael (2013). "Ma'mun (786–833)". In Bowering, Gerhard; Crone, Patricia; Kadi, Wadad; Mirza, Mahan; Stewart, Devin J.; Zaman, Muhammad Qasim (eds.). The Princeton Encyclopedia of Islamic Political Thought. Princeton University Press. pp. 328–329. ISBN 9780691134840.
- Daftary, Farhad (2013). A History of Shi'i Islam. I.B. Tauris. ISBN 9780755608669.
- Donaldson, Dwight M. (1933). The Shi'ite Religion - A History of Islam in Persia and Irak. AMS Press. ISBN 9780598503787.
- Drechsler, Andreas (2009). "QOM I - History to the Safavid Period". Encyclopaedia Iranica (Online ed.). ISSN 2330-4804.
- Gardet, L. (2012). "Karāma". In Bearman, P.; Bianquis, Th.; Bosworth, C.E.; van Donzel, E.; Heinrichs, W.P. (eds.). Encyclopaedia of Islam (Second ed.). doi:10.1163/1573-3912_islam_COM_0445. ISBN 9789004161214.
- Glassé, Cyril, ed. (2008). "'Abbāsids". The New Encyclopedia of Islam. Alta Mira. pp. 11–14. ISBN 9781905299683.
- Halm, Heinz (2001). "ḠOLĀT". Encyclopedia Iranica. Vol. XI/1. pp. 62–64. ISSN 2330-4804.
- Hulmes, Edward D. A. (2008). "Muhammad al-Taqi". In Netton, Ian Richard (ed.). Encyclopedia of Islamic Civilisation and Religion. Routledge. p. 433. ISBN 9780700715886.
- Hussain, Jassim M. (1986). Occultation of the Twelfth Imam - A Historical Background (PDF). Routledge. ISBN 9780710301581.
- Kennedy, Hugh (2015). The Prophet and the Age of the Caliphates - The Islamic Near East from the Sixth to the Eleventh Century (Third ed.). Routledge. ISBN 9781317376385.
- Kohlberg, E. (2012). "Mūsā al-Kāẓim". In Bearman, P.; Bianquis, Th.; Bosworth, C.E.; van Donzel, E.; Heinrichs, W.P. (eds.). Encyclopaedia of Islam (Second ed.). doi:10.1163/1573-3912_islam_SIM_5563. ISBN 9789004161214.
- Lewis, B. (2012). "'Alī al-Riḍā". In Bearman, P.; Bianquis, Th.; Bosworth, C.E.; van Donzel, E.; Heinrichs, W.P. (eds.). Encyclopaedia of Islam (Second ed.). doi:10.1163/1573-3912_islam_SIM_0540. ISBN 9789004161214.
- Madelung, W. (2012). "Muḥammad b. 'Alī al-Riḍā". In Bearman, P.; Bianquis, Th.; Bosworth, C.E.; van Donzel, E.; Heinrichs, W.P. (eds.). Encyclopaedia of Islam (Second ed.). doi:10.1163/1573-3912_islam_SIM_5343. ISBN 9789004161214.
- Madelung, W. (2011). "'Alī al-Hādī". Encyclopaedia Iranica. Vol. I/8. pp. 861–862. ISSN 2330-4804.
- Mavani, Hamid (2013). Religious Authority and Political Thought in Twelver Shi'ism - From Ali to Post-Khomeini. Routledge. ISBN 9780415624404.
- Medoff, Louis (2016). "Moḥammad al-Jawād, Abu Ja'far". Encyclopaedia Iranica (Online ed.). ISSN 2330-4804.
- Momen, Moojan (1985). An Introduction to Shi'i Islam. Yale University Press. ISBN 9780300034998.
- Modarressi, Hossein (1993). Crisis and Consolidation in the Formative Period of Shi'ite Islam - Abū Ja'far Ibn Qiba Al-Rāzī and His Contribution to Imāmite Shī'ite Thought (PDF). Darwin Press. ISBN 9780878500956. Archived from the original (PDF) on 16 June 2022.
- Pierce, Matthew (2016). Twelve Infallible Men - The Imams and the Making of Shi'ism. Harvard University Press. ISBN 9780674737075.
- Rahman, Habib Ur (1989). A Chronology of Islamic History, 570–1000 CE. G. K. Hall & Co. ISBN 9780816190676.
- Sachedina, Abdulaziz Abdulhussein (1981). Islamic Messianism - The Idea of Mahdi in Twelver Shi'ism. SUNY Press. ISBN 9780873954426.
- Sobhani, Ja'far (2001). Doctrines of Shi'i Islam (PDF). Translated by Shah-Kazemi, Reza. I.B. Tauris. ISBN 1860647804.
- Sourdel, D. (1970). "The ʿAbbasid Caliphate". In Holt, P.M.; Lambton, Ann K.S.; Lewis, Bernard (eds.). The Cambridge History of Islam, Volume 1A - The Central Islamic Lands from Pre-Islamic Times to the First World War. Cambridge University Press. pp. 104–139. LCCN 73-77291.
- Tabatabai, Sayyid Mohammad Hosayn (1975). Shi'ite Islam. Translated by Sayyid Hossein Nasr (First ed.). State University of New York Press. ISBN 0873953908.
- Wardrop, S.F. (1988). Lives of the Imams, Muhammad al-Jawad and 'Ali al-Hadi and the Development of the Shi'ite Organisation (PhD thesis). University of Edinburgh.

Muhammad al-Jawad of the Ahl al-Bayt Banu Hashim Clan of the Banu Quraish Born: 10th Rajab 195 AH ≈ 12 April 811 Died: 30th Dhu'l-Qa'da 220 AH ≈ 29 November 835
Shia Islam titles
Preceded by Ali al-Rida	9th Imam of Twelver Shi'a Islam; 818–835	Succeeded by Ali al-Hadi
