= Hakima Khatun =

Daughter of Muhammad al-Jawad

Hakima bint Muhammad al-Jawad Arabic: حكيمة بنت محمد الجواد
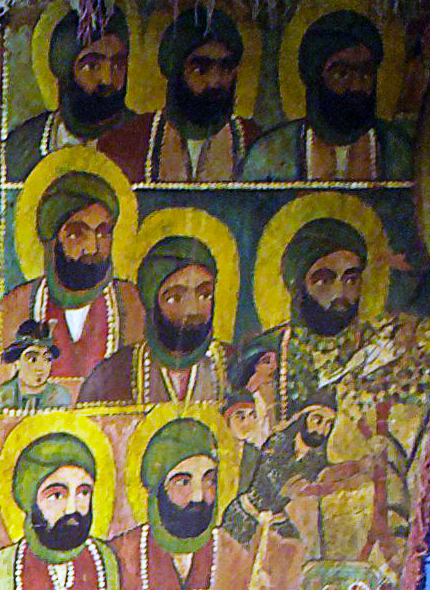
- Hakima (middle-left) depicted next to her father Muhammad al-Jawad in a typical Shiite depiction of several imams

Personal life
- Born: Medina, Abbasid Caliphate
- Resting place: Al-Askari shrine Samarra, Iraq
- Parents: Muhammad al-Jawad (father); Samana (mother)
- Other names: Hakima Khatun (lit. 'lady Hakima')
- Relatives: Ali al-Hadi (brother); Musa al-Mubarqa' (brother); Hasan al-Askari (nephew)

Religious life
- Religion: Shia Islam

Ḥakīma bint Muḥammad al-Jawād (Arabic: حكيمة بنت محمد الجواد), also known as Ḥakīma Khātūn (lit. 'lady Hakima'), was the daughter of Muhammad al-Jawad (d. 835), sister of Ali al-Hadi (d. 868), and paternal aunt of Hasan al-Askari (d. 874), who were the ninth, tenth, and eleventh Imams in Twelver Shia Islam, respectively. Her mother was Samana, a freed slave (umm walad) of Moroccan origin. A revered figure in Twelver Shia, she is buried in the al-Askari shrine in Samarra, located in modern-day Iraq, which has been targeted by Sunni militants as recently as 2007.

== Contribution to Twelver Shia ==
Hakima is a revered figure in Twelver Shia and appears frequently in the Twelver biographies of her contemporary Imams, where she is involved in their upbringing and protection, while also serving as their representative. Per Twelver reports, she was held in high regard by the tenth and eleventh Imams, and was entrusted by them with esoteric religious knowledge. In Bihar al-anwar, a major collection of Shia traditions, the Twelver theologian Majlesi (d. 1699) describes her as "the one who possessed the secret knowledge of the Imams and was among the agents and abwab." Here, abwab (lit. 'gates') refers to the intermediaries between Muhammad al-Mahdi and his followers. As their twelfth and last Imam, it is believed in Twelver Shia that Muhammad al-Mahdi has been miraculously concealed from the public since 874 and would return as the eschatological Mahdi at the end of time.

Hakima also plays a prominent role in the Twelver accounts of al-Mahdi's birth, which is said to have been hidden from the public out of the fear of persecution by the Abbasid caliphs, as they sought to eliminate an expected child of Hasan al-Askari, whom persistent rumors described as a savior. In Twelver sources, she is the main narrator of the nativity of al-Mahdi, considered authentic. This account is reported with small differences by various Twelver scholars, including Tabarsi (d. 1153) in I'lam al-wara and Ibn Babawayh (d. 991) in Kamal al-din. The mother of al-Mahdi is introduced as Narjis, a slave born and raised in the house of Hakima, according to the biographical Kitab al-irshad by the prominent Twelver theologian al-Mufid (d. 1022).

== Shrine ==
The al-Askari shrine in Samarra, located in modern-day Iraq, is attributed to Hakima, who is buried there alongside her brother al-Hadi, her nephew al-Askari, and Narjis. The shrine has been developed over time by various Shia and Sunni patrons. More recently, the complex was rebuilt in 1868-9 at the request of Naser al-Din Shah Qajar (r. 1848–1896), ruler of Persia and a Twelver, and the golden dome was added in 1905. As an important destination for Shia pilgrimage, the shrine was bombed in February 2006 and badly damaged. Another attack on 13 June 2007 destroyed the two minarets of the shrine. Iraqi authorities hold the Sunni extremist group al-Qaeda responsible for both attacks.

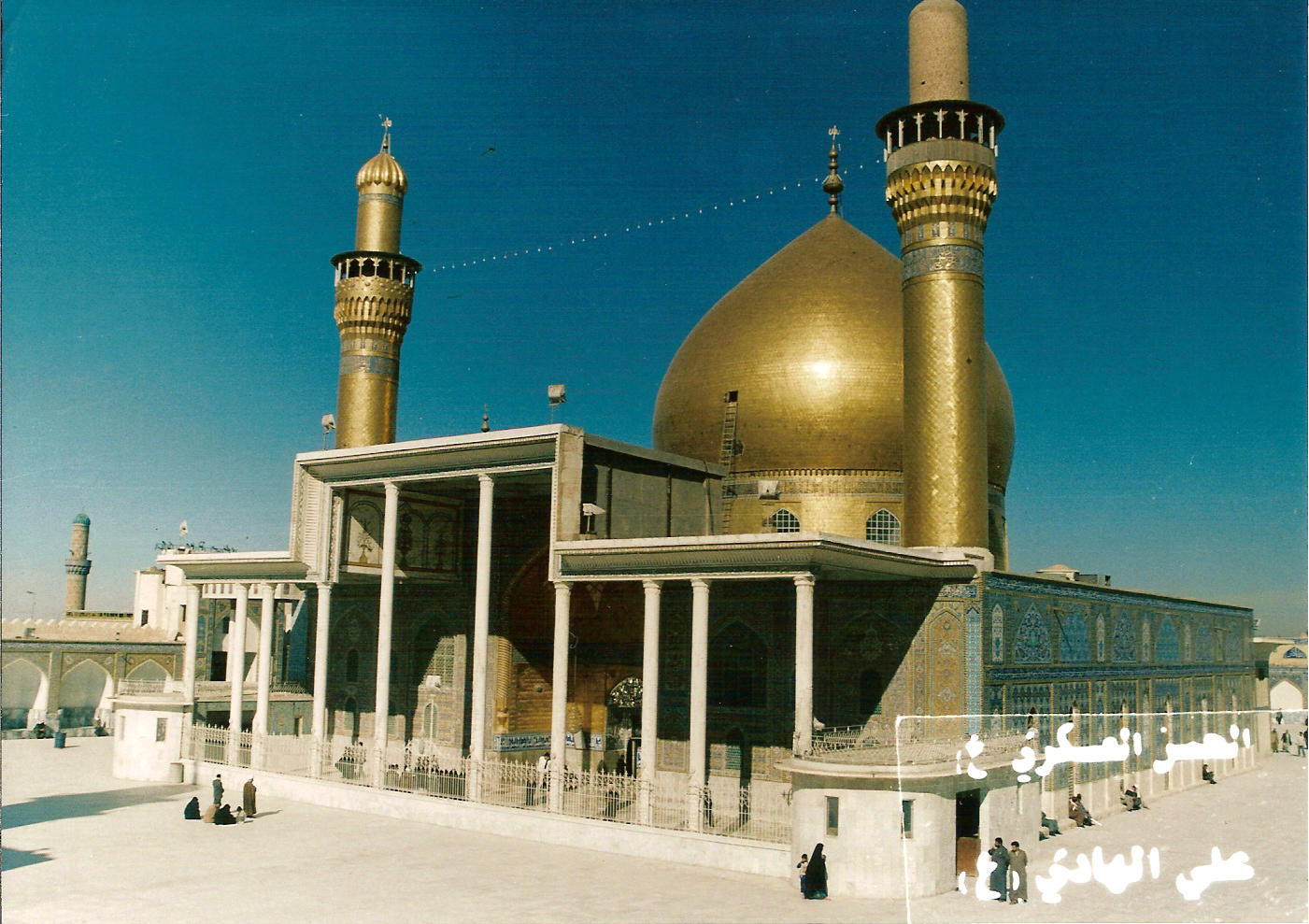
Al-Askari shrine in Samarra, located in modern-day Iraq, before the 2006 bombing

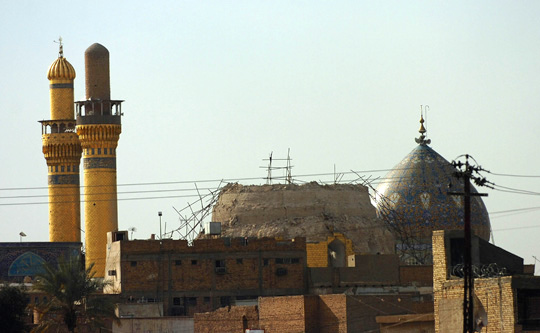
The shrine was damaged by bombings twice in 2006 and 2007

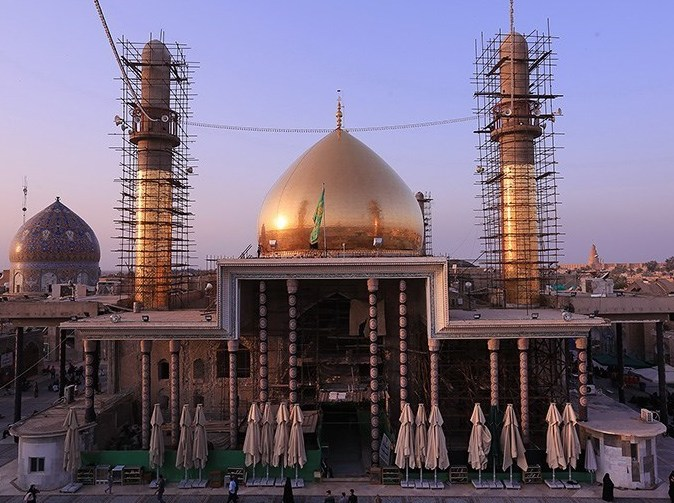
Al-Askari shrine in 2017, partially rebuilt after the bombings

== See also ==
- Ali al-Hadi
- Hasan al-Askari
- Narjis
- Muhammad al-Mahdi
