= Samana al-Maghribiyya =

Wife of Muhammad al-Jawad

Samana al-Maghribiyya سَمانَة المغْرِبِيَّة
- Born: possibly Dhu al-Hijja in the year 212 AH unknown
- Resting place: Al-Askari shrine Samarra, Iraq
- Spouse: Muhammad al-Jawad
- Children: Ali al-Hadi; Musa al-Mubarqa'; Hakima

Samana al-Maghribiyya (Arabic: سَمانَة المغْرِبِيَّة), also known as umm walad (concubine), and by the kunya Asma, Umm al-Fadl, was the wife of the ninth Imam Muhammad al-Jawad, and the mother of Ali al-Hadi, the tenth Imam. She is also referred to by the honorific al-Qanita ("the devout")

== Biography ==
Samana was of Maghribi (North African) origin and had been taken captive before being sold in a slave market. Muhammad al-Jawad purchased her from a slave market after his marriage to Umm al-Fadl, the daughter of the Abbasid caliph al-Ma'mun, who did not bear him any children. Some sources state that samana was a maidservant who was bought for 70 dinars by the order of Imam al-Jawad.

=== What her son Al-Hadi said about her ===
- mother knows my rights
- She is among the people of Paradise.
- No rebellious demon will approach it.
- And no stubborn tyrant can harm it.
- And it is protected by the eye of God that never sleeps.
- And it does not fall short of the mothers of the truthful and righteous.

== Children ==
The children attributed to Samana include:

- Ali al-Hadi — the eldest son of Muhammad al-Jawad and the tenth Imam of Twelver Shia Islam.
- Musa al-Mubarqa'.
- Hakima Khatun.

Ibn Shahr Ashub additionally mentioned Khadija and Umm Kulthum among her children.

The book Umdat al-Talib also lists Bariha, Umama, Fatima, and al-Hasan among the children attributed to her.

== Burial ==
Samana's grave is located in the Al-Askari Shrine in Samarra, alongside the graves of Imam Ali al-Hadi, Narjis (the mother of Imam al-Mahdi), Hakima (the daughter of Imam Muhammad al-Jawad), and Hudayth (the mother of Imam Hasan al-Askari).

Historical sources do not provide detailed information regarding the exact dates of Samana's birth and death. It is generally reported that she died approximately fifteen years after her husband, Muhammad al-Jawad, in Samarra. Her son, Ali al-Hadi, and her grandson, Hasan al-Askari, were later buried near her grave, and the site became known as the Al-Askari Shrine.
