= Ali ibn Mahziar Ahvazi =

9th-century Shia judicial scholar

Ali bin Mahziyar Ahvazi علی بن مهزیار اهوازی
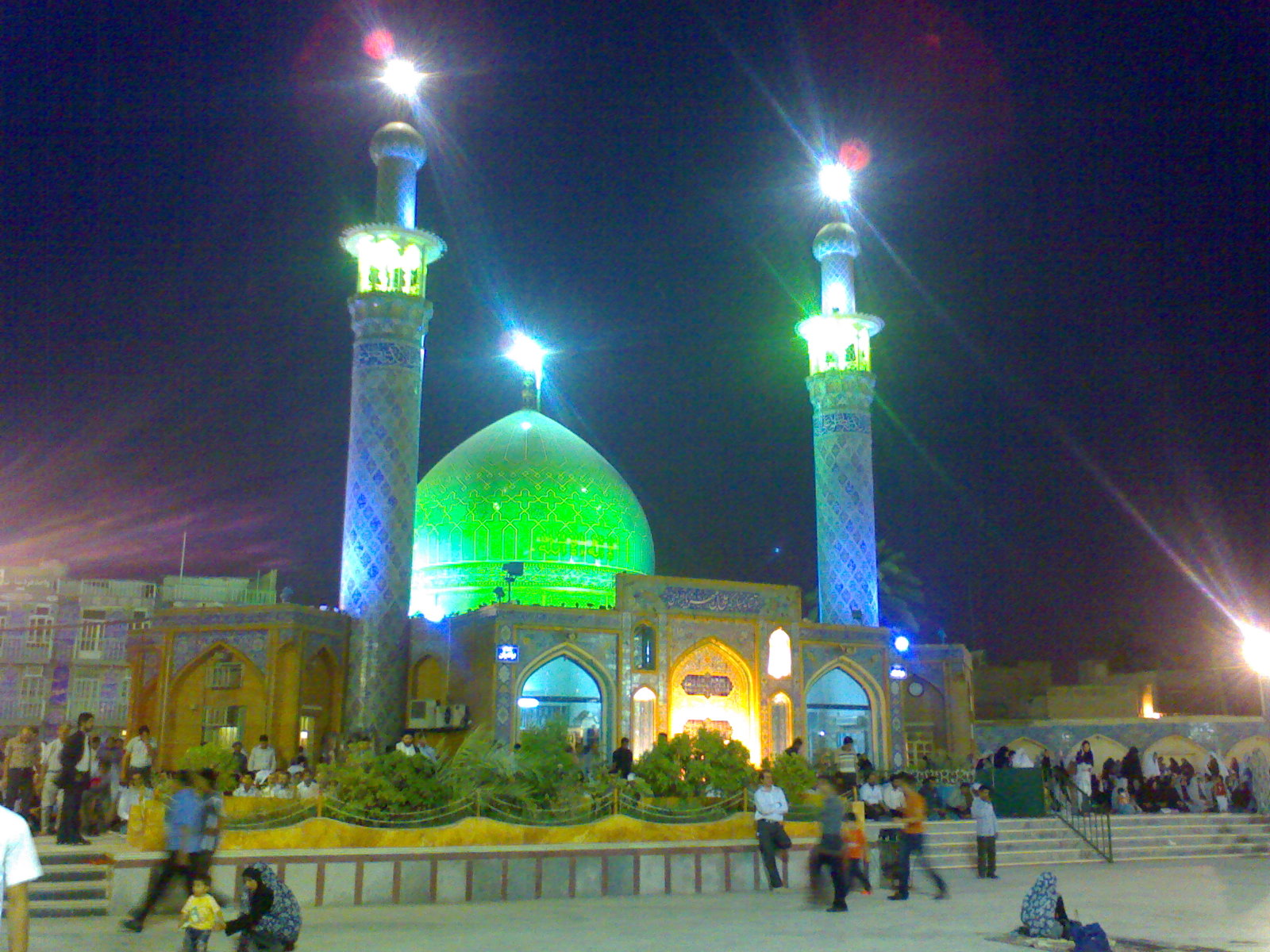

Personal life
- Born: Hendijan
- Died: 868–874 AD Ahvaz, Iran
- Era: Islamic golden age
- Main interest(s): Hadith and Fiqh
- Notable work(s): Kitab al-Malahim, Kitab al-Qa'im
- Occupation: Muslim scholar

Religious life
- Religion: Islam
- Denomination: Shia
- Jurisprudence: Ja'fari
- Creed: Twelver

Muslim leader
- Disciple of: Ali al-Rida, Muhammad al-Jawad, Ali al-Hadi, Hasan al-Askari
- Students: Abu Ja'far Ahmad al-Barqi, Ibrahim ibn Hashim al-Qummi

Ali bin Mahziyar Ahvazi (Persian: علی بن مهزیار اهوازی) or Ali ibn Mahziyar al-Ahwazi (Arabic: علي ابن مهزيار الأحوازي) was a prominent Shia Muslim religious scholar, jurist (faqīh), muhaddith (hadith narrator) and companion of Shia Imams Ali al-Rida (799–818), Muhammad al-Jawad (818–835), Ali al-Hadi (835–868), and Hasan al-Askari (868–874). He was also their agent (wakīl) in Ahvaz, southern Iran. He learned Islamic jurisprudence from the Shia Imams. Shia scholars accept his religious narrates about the Fourteen Infallibles with complete confidence, and his narrations are deemed trustworthy by them. Ali ibn Mahziar is noted for his writings, including a Kitab al-malahim [Book of Prophecies], as well as a Kitab al-qa'im. His books would later be incorporated into Ibn Babawayh's Man La Yahduruhu al-Faqih, one of the canonical Four Books of Shia hadith collection, more than a century later.

Mahziar was born in Hendijan but as Hendijan was Doraq (today known as Shadegan) city suburban he was known as Doraq resident. His father, Mahziar, was a Christian but converted to Islam with his son during the latter's youth. Later he stayed in Ahvaz. The time of his death is unknown, but presumably he died during Hasan al-Askari'a Imamah. His shrine is well known in Ahvaz.

Ali al-Ridha, the eighth Shia Imam, entered Ahvaz on his way to Khorasan and stayed in the city, since Al-Ma'mun, Abbasid caliph, commanded to transfer Ali al-Ridha to Khorasan from Medina. A few days later, on Ali al-Ridha's accommodation, a mosque named Masjed Al-Redha was built which Ali ibn Mahziar's body buried in it according to his will. There is a salon, in the western part next-door to the grave. It's supposed to be the mosque that mentioned before.

== Life ==
Ali ibn Mahziar Ahvazi was the agent of al-Jawad and later al-Hadi in Ahwaz. The two sons of Ali ibn Mahziar, named Ibrahim and Muhammad, later served in Ahwaz as the representatives of Muhammad al-Mahdi. Bihar describes a visit to al-Hadi by Ali and his brother Ibrahim in 228 AH (842-3), which signals that the Imam had finally emerged by this time from his isolation under hostile Abbasid caretakers. Ali and his brother likely continued to represent al-Hadi afterward because Ibrahim's son Muhammad reported the instructions of his father on his deathbed to deliver some money to Hafs ibn Amr, another representative in Baghdad.

== Works ==
He wrote two books, namely, Kitab al-Malahim and Kitab al-Qa'im, both about occultation, which is the Twelver belief that al-Askari has a son Muhammad al-Mahdi, who has been miraculously concealed from the public since 874 and would return as the eschatological Mahdi at the end of time.

Other works of Ali ibn Mahziar Ahvazi's are as follows: "Ablution", "Salah", "Zakat", "Fasting", "Hajj", "Divorce", "Virtues", "Examples", "Prayer", "Luxury and Marwah", "Shrine", "Rejection "On the grain", "wills", "inheritance", "khums", "martyrdom", "virtues of the believers", "taqiyyah", "hunting", "drinking", "vow of faith" and "atonement", "limits", " Diyat "," Ataq and Tadbir "," Trades and Rents "," Makaseb "," Tafsir ".

== Teachers ==
Among the teachers of Ali Ibn Mahziar Ahvazi:

Muhammad ibn Abi Umayr, Ahmad ibn Ishaq Abhari, Ahmad ibn Muhammad ibn Abi Nasr, Hassan ibn Ali ibn Fadhal, Hamad ibn Isa, Safwan ibn Yahya, Hassan ibn Mahbub, Hussein ibn Saeed Ahwazi, Abdullah ibn Yahya, Muhammad ibn Hassan Qomi, Muhammad Ibn Ismail Ibn Bazi, Musa Ibn Qasim, ...

== Letter of the 9th Shia-Imam (Al-Jawad) ==
The letter of the 9th Imam of the Shia Islam (Muhammad ibn Ali al-Jawad (Arabic: محمد بن علي الجواد), about Ali bin Mahziyar Ahwazi:

"O Ali, may God reward you well and make you dwell in his paradise, and protect you from humiliation in this world and the hereafter, and may he gather you with us... If I say that I have not seen anyone like you, I hope that I have spoken the truth "
