= Zarih =

Ornate lattice structure enclosing a grave in Islamic shrines

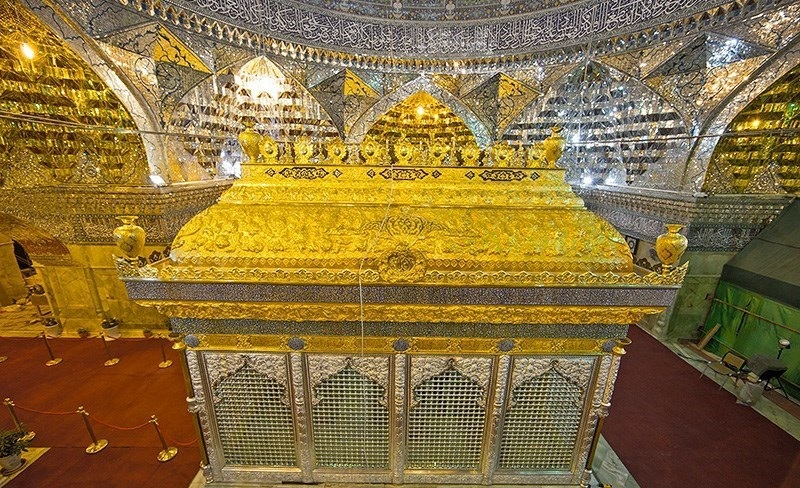
The zarih in the Al-Askari Shrine which surrounds the graves of Hasan al-Askari, Ali al-Hadi, and Narjis Khatun

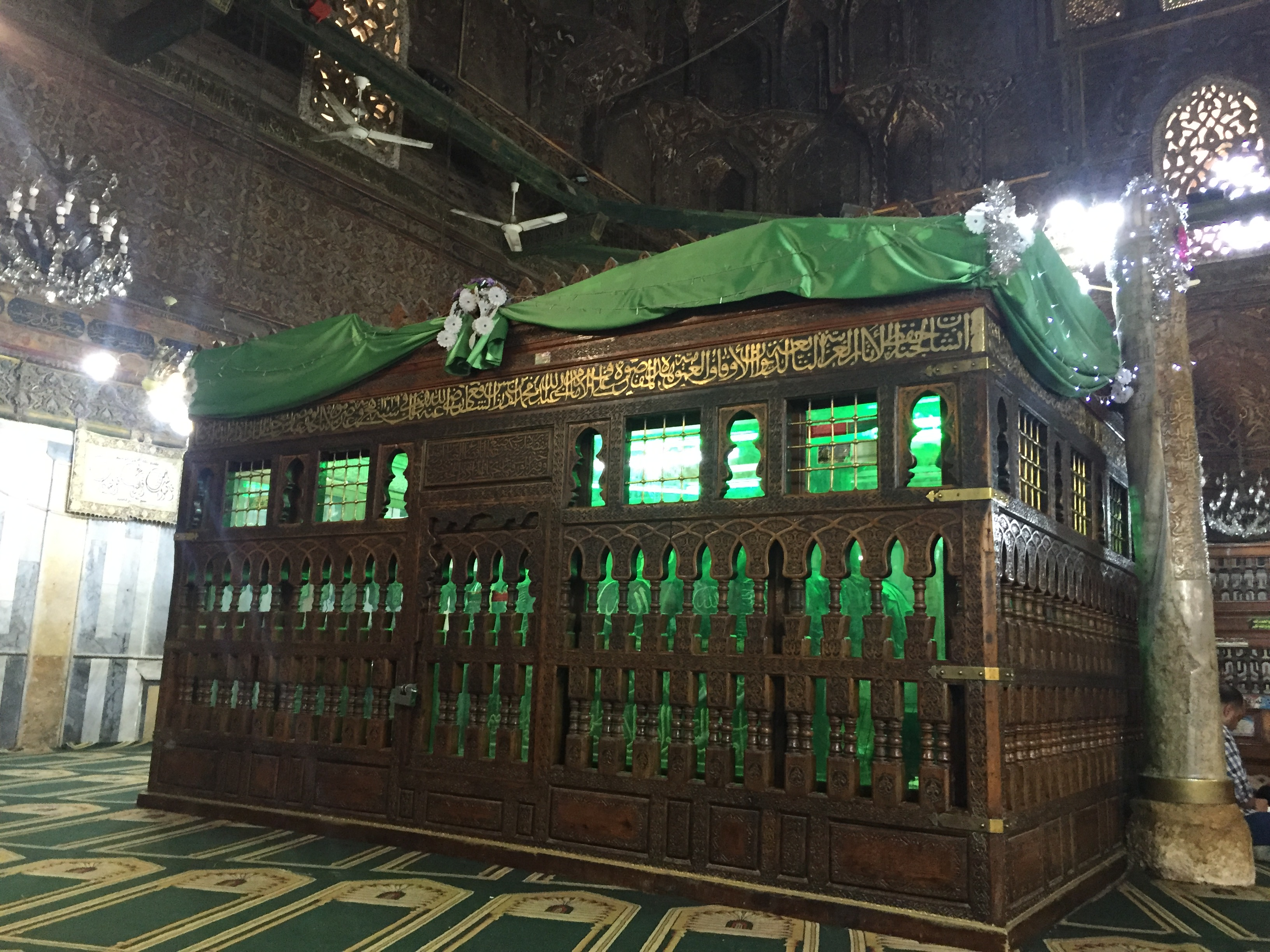
The large wooden zarih built over the grave of Muhammad ibn Idris al-Shafi'i before the renovation.

A zarih (Persian: ضَرِیح, Persian: ضَریح, Urdu: ضَرِیح, Hindi: ज़रीह) or ḍarīḥ (Arabic: ضَرِيح) is a lattice structure which usually encloses a grave in a mosque or an Islamic shrine. In some cases, it can also surround a religious relic on display.

A zarih is built by skilled craftsmen. It can be made out of metals such as silver, or it can be made of wood. The structures can be the size of a small room.

Notable zarih can be found in the Imam Husayn Shrine, the mosque of Imam Ali, and the Shrine of Abdul Qadir al-Jilani.

A zarih surrounding a grave which is claimed to be that of biblical Daniel, Tomb of Daniel, Susa, Iran.

== See also ==
- Islamic architecture
- Shia
- Sufi
