= Wokala =

Historical Shia Muslim agent network

The Wokala (singular: wakil; Arabic: وكلاء, romanized: wokala, lit. 'agents') were a networks of agents who were active from the time of Musa al-Kazim until the end of the Minor Occultation in 941 CE. The Wokala was responsible for the relations between Imams and Shia Muslims, as well as collecting religious taxes.

== Terminology ==
Wikalah is an Arabic word describing a person who performs duties on behalf of someone else. It is similar to the English terms agent or power of attorney. A wikalah is a second in command, trusted with acting on behalf of a principal. Wikalah (plural) is used when a person is unable to perform a task directly.

== History ==
Shia imams frequently had to deal with persecution and sometimes - in order to protect themselves - resorted to the practice of taqiya, a form of religious dissimulation. Because of the critical situation of the imams in this era, they were looking for a way to connect with Shia Islam. Often deputies acted secretly on behalf of the Abbasid Caliphs and, in some cases, it was not known that they were imam's deputies.

=== Formation ===
The network of agents (Wikalah) was established during the sixth Imam, Ja'far al-Sadiq. It peaked in the time of the eleventh Imam, Hasan al-Askari. The network of agents was especially important during the minor occultation, because Imam Mahdi only contacted his followers through the agents. The function of this system is shown in letters of instruction of the Al-Hadi. According to Jassim M. Hussain and Abdulaziz Sachedina, deputies were responsible for managing the society. Jassim M. Hussain said: "Gradually the leadership of the Wikalah became the only authority which could determine and prove the legitimacy of the new Imam."

For example, the ninth Imam, al‑Jawad said to the head of his deputies about installing Al-Hadi as next Imam.

=== Minor occultation ===
The Four Deputies or Gates (Arabic: أبواب), in Twelver Shia Islam, were four individuals who served as intermediaries between the community and the twelfth and final Imam upon his entering the Minor Occultation. The deputies are referred to by the Arabic terms Safir (emissary), Na'ib (deputy) or Wakil (advocate).

Twelver tradition holds that four deputies acted in succession to one another from 873 to 941 CE:

1. Uthman ibn Sa’id al-Asadi († 873–80)
2. Abu Jafar Muhammad ibn Uthman ibn Sa’id al-Asadi († 917)
3. Abul Qasim Husayn ibn Ruh al-Nawbakhti († 938)
4. Abul Hasan Ali ibn Muhammad al-Samarri († 941)

The Major Occultation began following the death of the last deputy and, according to the Shia doctrine, will continue until the return of the Mahdi.

== See also ==
- Ali al-Hadi
- Muhammad al-Mahdi
- Sayyid Ali Akbar
- List of extinct Shia sects
- Muhammad ibn Ali al-Hadi
- Muhammadite Shia
- Imamate (Twelver doctrine)
- Ahl Al-Bayt
- Jafar ibn Ali al-Hadi
