= Ibn Ali =

Ibn Ali, bin Ali, or ben Ali is an Arabic patronomyic, meaning 'son of Ali', often referring to Ali ibn Abi Talib. It may refer to the following people:

- The Alids, descendants of Ali, the fourth Rashidun caliph and the first Imam in Shia Islam
  - Abbas ibn Ali (c. 647–680), fourth Rashid caliph in Sunni Islam
  - Hasan ibn Ali (625–670), Alid political and religious leader
  - Hasan ibn Ali Al-Askari (c.844–874), eleventh of the Twelve Imams in Shia Islam
  - Hasan ibn Ali al-Utrush (c. 844–917), full name Abū Muḥammad al-Ḥasan ibn ʿAlī ibn al-Ḥasan ibn ʿAlī ibn ʿUmar al-Ashraf ibn ʿAlī Zayn al-ʿĀbidīn ibn al-Ḥusayn, Alid missionary of the Zaydi Shia sect
  - Husayn ibn Ali (626–690), Alid political and religious leader
  - Zayd ibn Ali (695–740), religious and political figure
- Abu al Fadl Ahmad ibn Ali ibn Muhammad al Kinani (1372–1449), better known as Ibn Hajar al-Asqalani, classic Islamic scholar
- Abulfeda (1273–1331), full name Ismāʿīl bin ʿAlī bin Maḥmūd bin Muḥammad bin ʿUmar bin Shāhanshāh bin Ayyūb bin Shādī bin Marwān, Mamluk-era Kurdish geographer, historian, Ayyubid prince and local governor of Hama
- Abu Mansur ibn Ali (c. 960–1036), Persian Muslim mathematician and astronomer
- Abu Mansur Muwaffaq, full name Abū Manṣūr Muwaffaq ibn ʻAlī al-Harawī, 10th-century Persian physician
- Ali ibn Ridwan (c. 988–c. 1061), full name Ali ibn Ridwan ibn Ali ibn Ja'far al-Misri , Arab physician, astronomer, and astrologer
- Hamza ibn Ali (c. 985–c. 1021), Persian Ismai'li missionary and founder of the Druze
- Muhammad ibn Ali (disambiguation), multiple people
- Sharif Hussein ibn Ali (1853–1931), Hejazi leader and Sharif of Mecca
- Taqi al-Din Ahmad ibn 'Ali al-Maqrizi (1364–1442), better known as al-Maqrizi, medieval Egyptian historian and biographer
- Zayn al-‘Ābidīn Ibn ‘Alī (c. 658–712), better known as Ali al-Sajjad, fourth Imam in Shia Islam
