= Muhammad ibn Ali =

Muhammad ibn Ali may refer to:

- Muhammad ibn al-Hanafiyyah, (636–700) son of Ali, fourth Imam of Kaysanites Shia
- Muhammad ibn Ali al-Sanusi (1787–1859), Algerian Muslim theologian and founder of the Sanusi order
- Muhammad ibn Ali ibn Abdallah, grandson of Abdullah bin Abbas and the father of As-Saffah the first Abbasid Caliph; also Imam of Kaysanites Shia after the death of Abu Hashim
- Muhammad al-Baqir (676–733), son of Ali ibn Husayn (Zayn al-'Ābidin), the fourth Imam according to Mustaali and Nizari Ismaili, the fifth Imam according to Twelvers, Seveners and Karmatians
- Muhammad ibn Ali al-Hadi was the son of Ali al-Hadi and the brother of Hasan al-Askari
- Muḥammad ibn Ali Awzal, author in the Tashelhiyt language
- Muhammad ibn `Ali at-Tirmidhi (died c. 869), Sunni jurist (faqih) and traditionist (muhaddith) of Khorasan, also known as Al-Hakim al-Tirmidhi
- Muhammad ibn Ali ibn al-Layth, Saffarid emir
- Muhammad Ben Ali Rabati, Moroccan painter
