= Faris ibn Hatim ibn Mahawayh al-Qazvini =

Islamic author and scholar

Faris ibn Hatim ibn Mahawayh al-Qazvini was initially one of the representative of Ali al-Hadi, the tenth Imam in Twelver Shia Islam. These representatives were responsible for the financial and religious affairs of the Shia community, especially for the collection of religious taxes like Khums. Following the same tenet of political quietism to which Shia Imams adhered, these representatives also took on the role of directing and organizing the Shia community. In particular, Faris was the intermediary with the followers of al-Hadi in the Jibal, which encompassed the central and western parts of modern-day Iran. (Note: Al-Hadi's representatives appear to have been split up into four distinct regions: the first one included Baghdad, Mada'in, the Sawad, and Kufa; the second, Basra and Ahwaz; the third, Qom and Hamadan; and the fourth, the Hejaz, Yemen, and Egypt.)

Faris was involved around 862 in a dispute with another representative, Ali ibn Ja'far, and was consequently banned by al-Hadi from receiving alms on his behalf. He continued to do so, however, without forwarding them to al-Hadi, who excommunicated Faris in 864 for embezzling religious dues. Later when Faris continued to openly incite against al-Hadi, the latter called for his death, and he was indeed assassinated during the imamate of Hasan al-Askari, the successor of al-Hadi.

== Dispute with al-Hadi ==
In Samarra, located in modern-day Iraq, Faris served as a senior representative of Ali al-Hadi, the ninth Imam in Twelver Shia. There he was involved in a conflict with another representative by the name of Ali ibn Ja'far al-Hamani. This dispute let to acrimonious arguments on both sides and created discomfort in the Shia community. Moreover, the local representatives of al-Hadi were unsure which of the two agents they should entrust with their collected religious dues. Al-Hadi sided against Faris and ordered his representatives not to use the latter for their business with al-Hadi. At the same time, he requested that his representatives refrain from talking about his choice to avoid provoking Faris. According to the Twelver author Kashshi, al-Hadi did this because Faris was an influential person and served as the primary intermediary between al-Hadi and the Shias of Jibal, who usually sent their religious obligations to al-Hadi through him. Despite al-Hadi's orders to the contrary, Faris received funds from that region, which he did not deliver to al-Hadi. At this point, al-Hadi decided to make the issue public and requested that his representatives inform the Shia community that Faris was no longer to be trusted and funds intended for the Imam should not be handed to him. Then in two letters, one dated Tuesday 9 Rabi al-Awwal 250 AH (20 April 864), he officially anathematized Faris. After that, Faris started an open campaign against al-Hadi. The sources do not provide details about his activities except that he allegedly turned into a significant troublemaker who called people to bid'a in an effort to attract them to his side. In a letter he sent to some of his supporters in Samarra, al-Hadi accused Faris of "a wicked utterance". The deterioration of the situation is evident in al-Hadi's next action, the extraordinary, though unprecedented, call by al-Hadi to assassinate his rebel agent. One of his followers later executed this order.

== His followers ==
After the death of Faris, his followers argued that the true successor of al-Hadi was his eldest son Muhammad, even though he had died before his father. Ali al-Hadi had instead designated as his successor his son Hasan, who backed his father's position against Faris, in contrast to al-Hadi's other son Ja'far. Forming a splinter group from the Imamite community, the followers of Faris believed that Ja'far was chosen by Muhammad to succeed him, and that Ja'far was the successor of Ali al-Hadi. They claimed that Muhammad had left the Imamate's treasures to his personal assistant Nafis, who then delivered them to Ja'far. He thus gathered some followers after al-Hadi, mostly from among the adherents of Faris. The Ja'farites were nevertheless extinct by 373 AH (983-4), as some converted to the mainstream Twelver Shia and some emigrated to Egypt or elsewhere and joined Sufi orders.
