= Abdullah ibn Ja'far al-Himyari =

Abdullah ibn Ja'far al-Himyari (Arabic:عَبدالله بن جَعفَر الحِمیَری) was a Shia scholar and narrators of hadith during the era of Ali al-Hadi and Hasan al-Askari , as well as Minor Occultation . Qurb al-Isnad was among his works. Himyari's nickname was Abu al-Abbas.

== Lineage ==
Ahmad ibn Ali al-Najashi considered the linage of Himyari's father to be Ja'far ibn Husayn ibn Malik ibn Jamei, but Ali ibn Babawayh Qummi, in mentioning his lineage, repeatedly mentioned him only with the shortened lineage of Abdullah ibn Ja'far ibn Jamei. This means, according to Pakatchi, that he was known to the Qumites as Ibn Jamei. In the final decades of the third century AH, as pressure on the Shias of Iraq increased, Qum became a refuge for the Imamiyya scholars. According to Pakatchi, it is not far-fetched to say that Himairi was originally from Iraq, probably the city of Kufa, and that he made his way to Qom in the later stages of his life.

== Works ==
His works are including Al-Ghayba, Qurb al-Isnad and some correspondences about Jurisprudence and Theology, among which Qurb al-Isnad have remained until today. In writing this book, Himyari used older texts, one of the most important of which is the book Al Masael Ali bin Jafar Arizi.
