= Muhammad ibn Ali al-Hadi Mausoleum attack =

2016 terrorist attack in Balad, Iraq

- Part of the War in Iraq (2013–2017)
- Muhammad ibn Ali al-Hadi Mausoleum attack (Iraq)
- Location: 34.0000°N 44.1333°E; Mausoleum of Sayid Mohammed bin Ali al-Hadi, Balad, Iraq
- Date: 7 July 2016; 23:00 (AST)
- Target: Shia Pilgrims
- Weapons: Suicide car bombs, suicide bombs, guns, mortars
- Deaths: 56 to 100+ (+3 attackers)
- Injuries: 75+
- Perpetrator: Islamic State
- Motive: Anti-Shi'ism

On 7 July 2016, at least 56 people were killed and 75 injured after a group of attackers stormed the Mausoleum of Sayid Mohammed bin Ali al-Hadi, a Shia holy site in Balad, Iraq. The attackers included suicide car bombers, suicide bombers on foot, and several gunmen. They attacked Shia pilgrims celebrating Eid al-Fitr, which marks the end of the Muslim holy month of Ramadan. There were three suicide bombers, and one of them was killed by security personnel. There were other attackers too. IS also launched several mortars into the area.

The Islamic State carried out the attack, and claimed they killed over 100 people, which came shortly after a series of bomb attacks in Baghdad committed by IS that targeted Shias, killing at least 341 people and injuring over 246.

== Background ==
Four days before this attack, IS carried out the July 2016 Baghdad bombings, which constituted the deadliest single terror attack since the start of the Iraq War, killing at least 341 people. After that attack, an Iraqi official speaking to the Guardian predicted that the group's next target would be a Shia shrine, reflecting its "desperation".

The mausoleum is the resting place of Sayid Mohammed bin Ali al-Hadi, the son of Ali al-Hadi, the tenth Imam of the Twelve Imams. Therefore, it is a popular place for Shia pilgrims. Located at the shrine were many Shia pilgrims celebrating Eid al-Fitr, which marks the end of the Muslim holy month of Ramadan. The attack occurred during the Eid al-Fitr, when many pilgrims visit the site.

== Attack ==
Prior to the attack, IS launched several mortars into the area. After this, several attackers stormed the mausoleum using car suicide bombs, guns, and suicide belts or vests at around 23:00 (Iraqi time). There were three suicide bombers who attempted to run inside the mausoleum with the goal of blowing themselves up, killing civilians. One suicide bomber was shot by policemen before blowing himself up. A second bomber made his way inside the shrine and allegedly was able to blow himself up. The third bomber was stopped from entering the shrine after being hugged by a civilian, instead detonating his suicide vest outside of the gate near police officers. "At least 20 militants" then took over the shrine for half an hour, clashing with security while reinforcements arrived, killing at least seven. It is unknown whether or not any of the other attackers were killed or arrested. The fire caused by the bombing also heavily damaged the marketplace next to the compound.

The death toll of the attack was 56 with over 75 people injured, some critically. IS claimed that they killed over 100 people. They allegedly purposely targeted the Shias at the shrine.

== Aftermath ==
=== Reactions ===
Following the bombing, Shia cleric Muqtada al-Sadr deployed his militia to guard the shrine. The town went into a lockdown as other potential attackers were searched by the police.

Iraqi Defence Minister Khalid Al-Obeidi describe the attack as a "security failure". The Iraqi Prime Minister Haider al-Abadi also fired three his head of security after the bombing.

Sheikh Abu Salam Saede, a tribal leader from Balad, interpreted the bombing as an attempt to restart sectarian violence caused by IS's defeat at Fallujah eight days prior, and blamed the Saudi ambassador. Mustafa al-Sufi, a resident of Balad, reported that some residents blamed Sunnis and internally displaced Sunni Iraqis for inciting the bombing. However, the Guardian commented that the "toxic heights" of 2006, when sectarian conflict was ignited after the al-Askari mosque bombing had not yet been reached, a view shared by al-Sufi, as "political leaders and tribal figures [...] asked for citizens to put their faith in the government to stop the attacks".

Ján Kubiš, the Special Representative and Head of the United Nations Assistance Mission in Iraq, released a statement saying "It is clear the cowardly attack on the shrine aims to spark sectarian tensions and drag Iraq back to the dark days of sectarian conflict. With the people’s awareness and unity, the terrorists' goals will not be achieved."

== See also ==
- List of Islamist terrorist attacks
- List of terrorist incidents in 2016
- Terrorist incidents in Iraq in 2016
