= Tomb of Ahmad ibn Ishaq =

Shiite shrine in Iran

- آرامگاه احمد بن اسحاق (Persian)
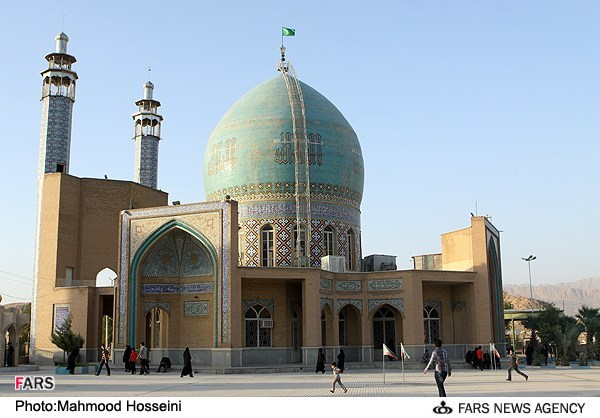
- Tomb of Ahmad ibn Ishaq outside view

- Location of Tomb of Ahmad ibn Ishaq within Iran
- 34.4625927°N 45.8432586°E
- Type: Dome, Tomb
- Location: Sarpol-e Zahab, Sarpol-e Zahab County, Kermanshah Province, Iran
- Nearest city: Sarpol-e Zahab

Site notes
- Architectural style: Iranian architecture
- Governing body: Government of Iran

The Tomb of Ahmad ibn Ishaq (Persian: آرامگاه احمد بن اسحاق) is a shrine in Sarpol-e Zahab, Sarpol-e Zahab County, Kermanshah Province, Iran. This shrine belongs to the Shiites and attributed to one of the close companions of Imam Hasan al-Askari, named Ahmad ibn Ishaq Ash'ari Qomi (died between 874 and 877 CE, buried here). The tomb of Ahmad Ibn Ishaq is located almost in the center of Sarpol-e Zahab and is considered the most important shrine of this city.

== Specification ==
The foundation of the building is steel and brick. The main building has four large porches, four small porches, a porch all around the outside of the building and the shrine itself. The entrance of the shrine consists of a large entrance 12 meters wide and 16 meters high. A blue dome 27 meters high and 15 meters in diameter with finials 27 meters high on both sides. The tomb, in addition to the large entrance that forms the entrance and the main shrine, also has three side doors.

The shrine, which is built on the grave, is decorated with gold and chrome and its dimensions are 1.8 × 2.2 meters and it is 2.5 meters high. The facade of the building from outside made of 5 cm Isfahani brick. A different view has been used for the interior architecture. The floor and 1.5 meters from the body (all around) are decorated with green marble and the rest up to the ceiling is decorated with 3 cm Isfahani brick with turquoise tile mortar. Ceilings and porches are also made of traditional bricks and tiles in the form of knots.

== Reconstruction ==
The old building was destroyed during Iran–Iraq War (1980–1988). In 1989, renovation of the building began. In 2011, a comprehensive plan for the reconstruction of this tomb was established. The building was damaged again in the earthquake on November 12, 2017. Reconstruction of the tomb began again in October 2018 by the Islamic Revolution Housing Foundation, the Endowment and Charity Organization, and the Mostazafan Foundation. The renovation task was done with a metal structure on a land with an area of 2,500 square meters and with 3,500 square meters of infrastructure on 2 floors in 2020.

== Courtyard ==
The courtyard with the purity and beauty of the shrine, adapted from Islamic and traditional architecture, which is located in the eastern part of this religious building, with the beautiful eucalyptus trees, is used as a mosque in religious festivals.

== Cemetery ==
In another part of the courtyard and around it, the graves of the martyrs of the Iran–Iraq War and the city cemetery of Sarpol-e Zahab are located.

== See also ==
- Malek Tomb
- Tomb of Wais
- Essaqwand Rock Tombs
- Gonbad-e Sorkh (disambiguation)
