= Ahmad ibn Ishaq Ash'ari Qomi =

Shia hadith scholar from 9th century

- احمد بن اسحاق اشعری قمی
- Born: Qom, Iran
- Died: between 874 and 877 CE; Hulwan, Iran
- Burial place: His tomb in Sarpol-e Zahab, Iran
- Occupations: Religious agent, Hadith scholar
- Parent: Ishaq ibn Abdullah ibn Sa'd (father)

Ahmad ibn Ishaq Ash'ari Qomi (Persian: احمد بن اسحاق اشعری قمی; died between 874 and 877 CE) was a Twelver Shia Muslim muhaddith (narrator of hadith) and a companion of the ninth, tenth and eleventh Shia Imams, Muhammad al-Jawad (c. 819–835), Ali al-Hadi (c. 835–868) and Hasan al-Askari (c. 868–874), and reportedly met the last Imam Muhammad al-Mahdi during his childhood. It is said that al-Hadi paid Ahmad's debts worth of thirty-thousand dinars, and he is also said to have been a delegate (wafid) from Qom by al-Askari.

His tomb is located in Sarpol-e Zahab, Kermanshah Province, Iran. The international congress in his honor was held in March 2011 and while issuing his stamp, the reconstruction of his tomb began.

== Genealogy ==
Ahmad ibn Ishaq Ash'ari Qomi is from the Al-Ashari family. His lineage is as follows: Ahmad ibn Ishaq ibn Abdullah ibn Sa'd ibn Malik al-Ahwas al-Ash'ari. His kunya or teknonymy was Abu Ali.

His ancestors were from the Ash'ari tribe who lived in the city of Kufa. His fourth forefather, Ahwas ibn Sa'il al-Ash'ari, in 739 CE, took part in the uprising of Zayd ibn Ali and took command of his corps, and after Zayd's martyrdom, he was arrested. After four years of imprisonment in Hajjaj prison, he was released through the intercession of his brother Abdullah, then they emigrated to Qom and forming the Ash'ari tribe of Qom.

His father, Ishaq ibn Abdullah ibn Sa'd, was one of the most trusted hadith narrators in Qom and narrated from Ja'far al-Sadiq and Musa al-Kadhim.

== Companion of three Imams ==
According to Shiite scholars, Ahmad ibn Ishaq was one of the companions of Muhammad al-Jawad (the ninth of the twelve Imams) and Ali al-Hadi (the tenth of the twelve Imams) and one of the close companions of Hasan al-Askari (the eleventh of the twelve Imams) and narrated from them. Also some books are listed for him, such as "Causes of Fasting" (Arabic: علل الصوم) and "Issues of Men" (Arabic: مسائل الرجال).

== The agent of Hasan al-Askari ==
In some sources, he is mentioned as the agent of Imam Hasan al-Askari (the eleventh of the twelve Imams in Shia Islam) in the endowments of Qom. Some have considered him as the agent of Ali al-Hadi (the tenth Imam), relying on some evidences.

== Careers ==
Ahmad ibn Ishaq was the agent of the Imams in the city of Qom and was responsible for the jurisprudential and doctrinal issues of the people (in Islamic sciences). He collected their funds and sent them to Imam Hasan al-Askari. He also took the necessary measures regarding endowments and it is known that by the order of Imam al-Askari, he started to build a mosque in the city of Qom, which is known today as Imam Hassan Askari Mosque.

Also, he was a hadith scholar and narrates from eleven sheikhs and masters and twenty-three Shiite narrators are his students and narrators. Early rijals and narrators have all praised him for his trustworthiness and have reported several hadith works for him.

== Demise ==
According to Mohammad ibn Omar ibn Abdol Aziz Kashshi's book Rijal al-Kashshi, Ahmad ibn Ishaq was alive until after the martyrdom of Imam Hasan al-Askari. According to this narration, he wrote a letter to the Imam Muhammad al-Mahdi (the son and the successor of Hasan al-Askari) asking for permission to go on Hajj pilgrimage. The Imam allowed him and sent him a cloth. When Ahmad saw the cloth, he said, "The Imam has announced my death". He died while returning from the Hajj pilgrimage in Hulwan, Iran.

It is stated in the book Dala'il al-Imamah: Ahmad ibn Ishaq was working as the agent of Imam Muhammad al-Mahdi until he asked his permission to go to Qom. The Imam, in a request for permission to travel, had stated that he would not reach Qom and would fall ill on the way and die. So he fell ill in Hulwan and died and was buried there. According to this, the date of his death is said to be the years around 874 to 877 CE. Of course, according to a narration from Ibn Babawayh, he died during the life of Imam Hasan al-Askari.

His tomb in the city of Sarpol-e Zahab is a Shiite shrine.

== Commemoration ==
The first congress in honor of Ahmad ibn Ishaq Ash'ari Qomi was held in Kermanshah in May 2006. َAlso an international congress in honor of Ahmad ibn Ishaq Ash'ari Qomi was held in March 2011. A special stamp of this congress was unveiled at the ceremony.

== See also ==
- Zakaria ibn Idris Ash'ari Qomi
- Zakaria ibn Adam Ash'ari Qomi
- Abu Hamza al-Thumali
- Safwan ibn Yahya
- Seyyed Mohammad Hojjat Kooh Kamari
- Mohammad ibn Umar Kashshi
- Mirza-ye Qomi
- Agha Hossein Khansari
- Mohammad Jafar Sabzevari
- Mohaghegh Sabzevari
