= Hasan ibn Rashid =

Companion of Ali al-Hadi

Hasan ibn Rashid حسن بن راشد

Title: Abu Ali ابو علی
- Birthplace: Baghdad, Mada'in
- Ethnicity: Arab
- Known For: Being a representative of Ali al-Hadi
- Influences: Ali al-Hadi
- Died: 237 AH / 851 AD
- Religion: Islam

Hasan ibn Rashid or Abu Ali ibn Rashid was a representative of Ali al-Hadi in Baghdad, Mada'in, and the Sawad. These representatives were responsible for the financial and religious affairs of the Imamite Shias especially for the collection of religious taxes like Khums and following the same tenet of political quietism of the Shia Imams, they took on the role of directing and organising the Shia community. Hasan predeceased al-Hadi and was praised by him, "He [Hasan] lived content and died a martyr."

A letter attributed to al-Hadi asks Hasan and Ayyub ibn Nuh, another representative of the imam, to resolve their dispute and work only within their defined areas. al-Hadi's representatives appear to have been split up into four distinct regions: the first one included Baghdad, Mada'in, the Sawad, and Kufa; the second, Basra and Ahwaz; the third, Qom and Hamadan; and the fourth, the Hejaz, Yemen, and Egypt. According to al-Shaykh al-Mufid, Hasan was one of the famous jurisprudents and chiefs from whom people took the verdicts of halal and haram and who were uncriticized and unblameable.

== See also ==
- Ayyub ibn Nuh
- Ikhtiyar ma'rifat al-rijal
