= Ayyub ibn Nuh =

Ayyub ibn Nuh ibn Duraj Nakhai was one of the trusted representatives of Ali al-Hadi in Kufa. (Note: Al-Hadi's representatives appear to have been split up into four distinct regions: the first one included Baghdad, Mada'in, the Sawad, and Kufa; the second, Basra and Ahwaz; the third, Qom and Hamadan; and the fourth, the Hejaz, Yemen, and Egypt.) These representatives were responsible for the financial and religious affairs of the Imamite Shias especially for the collection of religious taxes like Khums and following the same tenet of political quietism of the Shia Imams, they took on the role of directing and organising the Shia community. Since Ayyub handled large amounts of religious donations on behalf of al-Hadi, the people were apparently surprised to find out after his death that he had only left behind hundred-fifty dinars. According to Shaykh Tusi, he was reliable narrator and reported many narrations from al-Hadi. His father Nuh ibn Darraj was a Qadi in Kufa and Jameel bin Darraj was his brother.

A letter attributed to al-Hadi asks Ayyub ibn Nuh and Hasan ibn Rashid (a representative of al-Hadi in Baghdad, Mada'in, and the Sawad) to resolve their dispute and work only within their defined areas.
