= Ja'far ibn Ali al-Hadi =

Son of the tenth Shia Imam (c. 840–885)

Ja'far ibn Ali al-Hadi جعفر بن علي الهادي

Personal life
- Born: c. 226 AH (c. 840 CE) Medina, Arabia, Abbasid Caliphate
- Died: c. 885 (271 AH) (aged 45) Samarra, Abbasid Empire
- Resting place: Samarra
- Parents: Ali al-Hadi (father); Hudayth (or Susan or Salil) (mother)
- Relatives: Hasan al-Askari (brother); Muhammad (brother)

Religious life
- Religion: Shia Islam

Abū ʿAbd Allāh Jaʿfar ibn ʿAlī al-Hādī (Arabic: أبو عبد الله جعفر بن علي الهادي; 226-271 A.H., c. 840 CE – c. 885 CE), also derisively known as al-Kadhdhāb (Arabic: الکَذّاب, lit. 'the Liar') in Twelver Shi'ism, was the third son of the tenth Twelver Shi'a Imam, Ali al-Hadi. He claimed to be an imam and established his own sect of followers, to whom he was known as al-Zakī (Arabic: الزكي, lit. 'the pure one').

== Family ==
Jafar b. Ali b. Muḥammad was the son of the tenth Imam, Ali al-Hadi and the brother of eleventh Imam Hasan al-Askari. Also, he had one older brother, Muhammad who died before his father's death.

== Challenge ==
=== After the death of Ali al-Hadi ===
After the death of Ali al-Hadi, Jafar b. Ali claimed Imamate. Twelvers believed that he was immoral. Baháʼís believe that he was a truthful person.

In his defense, his followers claimed that his personality had changed from his youth. Jafar b. Ali's followers came to be known as the Ja’fariyya and al-Askari's followers were known as the Twelvers.

=== After the death of Hasan al-Askari ===
After the death of Hasan al-Askari, even though, al-Askari's mother was still alive, Jafar requested his property. He claimed that his brother never had a son.

== See also ==
- Ali al-Hadi
- Muhammad al-Mahdi
- Sayyid Ali Akbar
- List of extinct Shia sects
- Muhammad ibn Ali al-Hadi
- Muhammadite Shia
- Imamate (Twelver doctrine)
- Ahl Al-Bayt
