= Muhammadite Shia =

Shia sect

The Muhammadite Shia (named for Muhammad al Askari ibn Imam Ali al-Hadi) were a Shia sect who believed that due to the supposed lack of a son (according to their opinion) for Hasan al-Askari, they had to rethink the legitimacy of his Imamate. Therefore, they instead believed in the Imamate of his brother Muhammad al Askari ibn Imam Ali al-Hadi, who died 7 years before the death of his father. However, the Muhammadites denied the death of Muhammad al Askari ibn Imam Ali al-Hadi, and claimed that his father had pointed to him and appointed him as the Imam to succeed himself, and had mentioned him by his name and person. These beliefs, falsely according to them, are what were agreed by all.

To support their position, they believed it was impossible for the Imam to point through will to one who was not the Imam. Therefore, to support this belief, they argued that Muhammad al Askari ibn Imam Ali al-Hadi did not die in reality, as was apparent. According to them, his father had rather hidden him due to Taqiyyah (as the Ismailis claimed Ja'far al-Sadiq hid his son Isma'il ibn Jafar) and he was the Awaited Mahdi.

== Muhammadite sub-sect ==
=== Nafisites ===
The Nafisites (named for a servant of Ali al-Hadi called Nafis) were an extremist Shia sub-sect of the Muhammadites.

The Nafisites believed that Muhammad al Askari ibn Imam Ali al-Hadi did die and that he gave the will to a servant of his father called Nafis. According to them, Muhammad handed over to Nafis books, different kinds of knowledge, the sword and whatever the Ummah would need. They also believed that Muhammad advised Nafis to give all these things to his brother Ja'far ibn Ali al-Hadi if he (i.e. Muhammad) died.

The Nafisites took a very violent stand as regards Hasan al-Askari. They considered him and all those who believed in his Imamate as unbelievers. They also held extreme views in the case of Ja'far ibn Ali al-Hadi and claimed that he was the Mahdi.

== See also ==
- Islamic schools and branches
- List of extinct Shia sects
