= Ali al-Hadi =

Tenth of the Twelve Shia Imams (828–868)

Ali al-Hadi Tenth Imam of Twelver Shi'ism
- علي الهادي
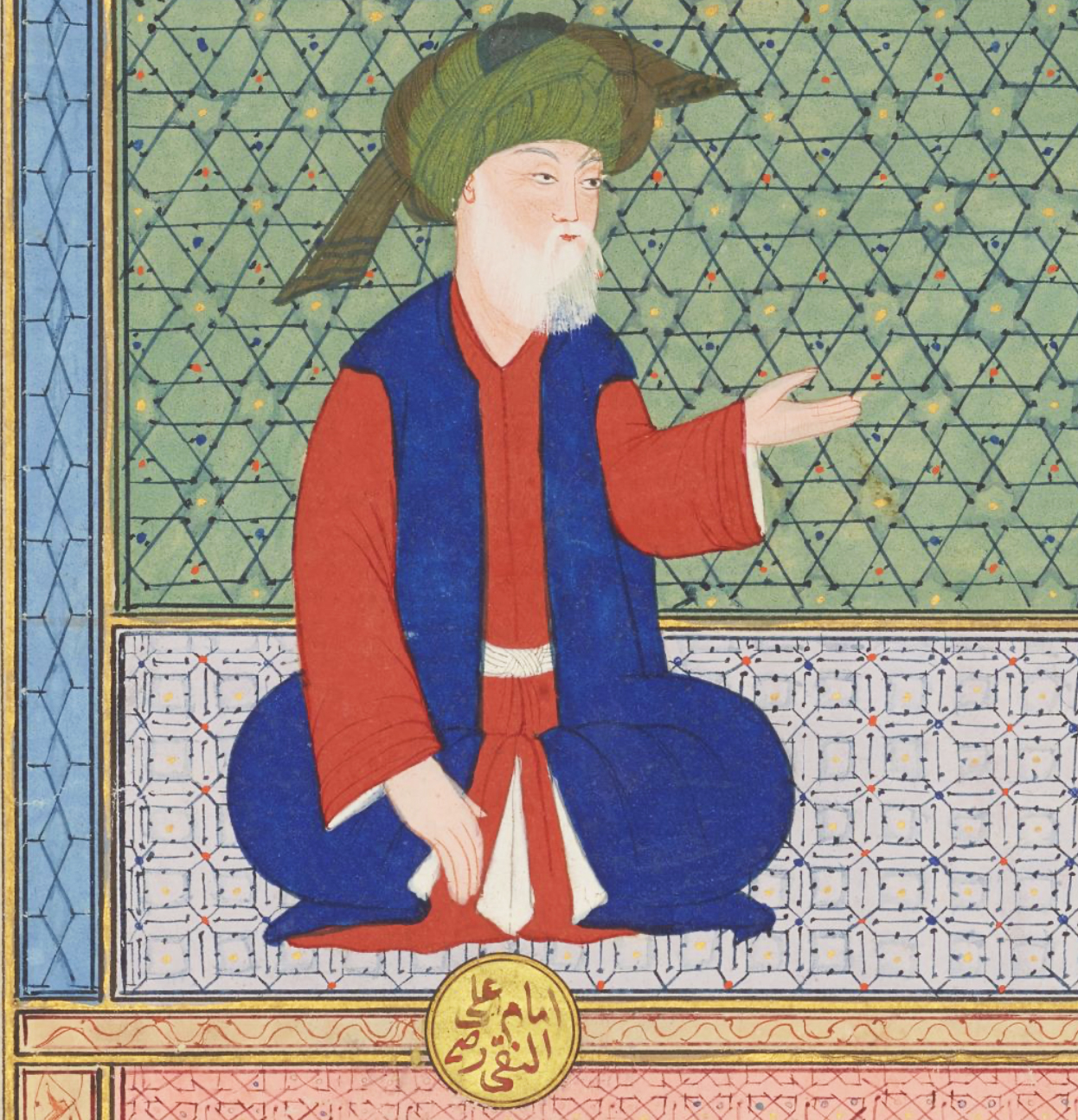
- 16th‑century Ottoman iconographic depiction of Ali al-Hadi

10th Shia Imam
- In office 835–868
- Preceded by: Muhammad al-Jawad
- Succeeded by: Hasan al-Askari
- Title: al-Hadi (lit. 'the guide'); al-Naqi (lit. 'the distinguished')

Personal life
- Born: c. 7 March 828 (16 Dhu'l-Hijja 212 AH) Medina, Abbasid Empire
- Died: c. 21 June 868 (aged 40) (26 Jumada II 254 AH) Samarra, Abbasid Empire
- Cause of death: Poisoned by the Abbasids (most Shia sources)
- Resting place: Al-Askari shrine, Samarra; 34°11′54.5″N 43°52′25″E
- Spouse: Hudayth (or Susan or Salil)
- Children: Hasan al-Askari; Muhammad; Ja'far
- Parents: Muhammad al-Jawad; Samana

Religious life
- Religion: Shia Islam

Ali ibn Muhammad al-Hadi (Arabic: علي بن محمد الهادي; c. 7 March 828 – c. 21 June 868) was a descendant of the Islamic prophet Muhammad and the tenth Imam in Twelver Shia, succeeding his father, Muhammad al-Jawad (d. 835). Born in Medina in 828, Ali is known with the titles al-Hādī (Arabic: الهادي, lit. 'the guide') and al-Naqī (Arabic: النقي, lit. 'the distinguished'). After the death of his father in 835, most followers of al-Jawad readily accepted the imamate of Ali, who was still a child at the time. Drawing parallels with the story of young Jesus in the Quran, Twelver sources attribute an exceptional innate knowledge to Ali which qualified him for the imamate despite his young age.

As with most of his predecessors, Ali al-Hadi kept aloof from politics until he was summoned around 848 from Medina to the capital Samarra by the Abbasid caliph al-Mutawakkil (r. 847–861), known for his hostility towards Shias. There al-Hadi was held under close surveillance until his death in 868 during the caliphate of the Abbasid al-Mu'tazz (r. 866–869). Still, he managed to communicate with an underground network of representatives who organized the financial and religious affairs of the Shia community on his behalf. Most Shia sources hold the Abbasids responsible for his death at the age of about forty through poison, with the notable exception of al-Shaykh al-Mufid (d. 1022). His image in Twelver sources is that of a pacifist, persecuted Imam who endured numerous attempts by members of the Abbasid court to humiliate and dishonor him. These sources also allege more serious incidents of house search, temporary imprisonment, and even murder plots against al-Hadi.

The restricted life of al-Hadi in Samarra marks the end of the direct leadership of the Shia community by the Imams. A theological treatise on free will and some other short texts are ascribed to al-Hadi. Some miracles are also attributed to al-Hadi in Twelver sources, which often emphasize his precognition about various incidents. After his death, the majority of his followers accepted the imamate of his son Hasan al-Askari, who was also detained in Samarra until his unexplained death a few years later. Some instead followed Ja'far, another son of al-Hadi, who became known as Ja'far al-Kadhab (lit. 'Ja'far, the liar') in the Twelver sources. After the death of Ja'far, however, this branch was eventually absorbed within the mainstream Twelver Shia. The tombs of al-Hadi and his successor al-Askari are located in the Al-Askari Shrine in Samarra, modern-day Iraq. A sacred site for Shia pilgrims, the shrine has been targeted by ISIS (Daesh) extremist militants as recently as 2007.

== Titles ==
Ali al-Hadi, the tenth Imam in Twelve Imams, was known by the titles al-Hadi (Arabic: الهادي, lit. 'the guide') and al-Naqi (Arabic: النقي, lit. 'the distinguished'). He was also known as al-Mutawakkil (Arabic: المتوكل على الله, lit. 'he who relies on God'), but this title was perhaps rarely used to avoid confusion with the Abbasid caliph al-Mutawakkil (r. 847–861). In view of their restricted life in the garrison town of Samarra under Abbasid surveillance, Ali and his son Hasan share the title al-Askari (Arabic: عسكري, lit. 'military'). Ali al-Hadi is also cited in the Shia hadith literature as Abu al-Hasan al-Thalith (Arabic: أبوالحسن الثالث, lit. 'Abu al-Hasan, the third'), so as to distinguish him from his predecessors, namely, Musa al-Kazim (d. 799) and Ali al-Rida (d. 818), the seventh and the eighth of the Twelve Imams, respectively.

== Life ==
=== Birth (c. 828) ===
Ali al-Hadi was born on 16 Dhu'l-Hijja 212 AH (7 March 828) in Sorayya, a village near Medina founded by his great-grandfather, Musa al-Kazim. There are also other given dates in the window of Dhu'l-Hijja 212 AH (March 828) to Dhu'l-Hijja 214 AH (February 830), though these alternatives might be less reliable. It is also 15 Dhu'l-Hijja that is annually celebrated by Shias for this occasion. Ali al-Hadi was the son of Muhammad al-Jawad (d. 835), the ninth of the Twelve Imams, and his mother was Samana (or Susan), a freed slave (umm walad) of Maghrebi origin. The historian Teresa Bernheimer considers it possible that Ali was instead born to Umm al-Fadl, a daughter of the Abbasid caliph al-Ma'mun (r. 813–833), though this marriage is often considered without an issue. As for his birthplace, the Shia-leaning historian al-Masudi (d. 956) differs from the prevalent view. Ithbat al-wassiya, a collective biography of the Shia Imams attributed to him, reports that Ali was first taken to Medina sometime after 830 when al-Jawad and his family left Iraq to perform Hajj pilgrimage to Mecca.

=== Reign of al-Mu'tasim (r. 833–842) ===
Ali al-Hadi lived in Medina in this period. Probably summoned by al-Mu'tasim (r. 833–842), his father al-Jawad and his wife Umm al-Fadl traveled to the Abbasid capital Baghdad in 835, leaving Ali behind in Medina. Muhammad al-Jawad died in Baghdad in the same year, at the age of about twenty-five. During this short window, Shia sources accuse al-Mu'tasim of multiple attempts to discredit al-Jawad and finally murdering him by poison, while Sunni sources are silent about the cause of his death. Ali al-Hadi was about seven years old when his father died. Among others, multiple Shia accounts in Ithbat and Dala'il al-im'ama show Ali supernaturally alert the very moment his father died. Dala'il al-im'ama is another early collective biography of Shia Imams, often attributed to the Twelver author Ibn Jarir ibn Rustam al-Tabari.

After the death of his father, the young Ali was likely placed by the Abbasids under hostile care. In these years, even Muhammad ibn Faraj, a trusted associate of the previous Shia Imams, was probably unable to directly contact Ali, as implied by a report in Bihar al-Anwar, a seventeenth-century collection of Shia hadiths by the prominent Twelver scholar Mohammad-Baqer Majlesi (d. 1698). Ithbat reports that Umar ibn al-Faraj al-Rukhaji, an Abbasid official known for his hostility to Shias, visited Medina soon after the death of al-Jawad and placed Ali under the care of a non-Shia tutor, named Abu Abd-Allah al-Junaydi. This was intended to isolate Ali from Shias to the point that Ithbat reports that he was kept under house arrest. The account in Ithbat also describes how al-Junaydi was so impressed with the knowledge of the child that he eventually became a Shia. This exceptional innate knowledge of the young Ali is also claimed by the prominent Twelver theologian Al-Shaykh al-Mufid (d. 1022) in his biographical Kitab al-Irshad, which is considered reliable and unexaggerated by most Shias. In connection to these reports, the Islamicist Matthew Pierce draws parallels with the Hebrew Psalms, Christian gospels, and the Quran, particularly the Quranic verse 3:46 about Jesus, "He will speak to people in the cradle."

=== Reign of al-Wathiq (r. 842–847) ===
Ali al-Hadi emerged from isolation with the accession of the less hostile caliph al-Wathiq in 842, who had earlier led the funeral prayer for al-Jawad. The Shia community was relatively free in this period, and the early historian Abu al-Faraj al-Isfahani (d. 967) reports that stipends were given to the Alids, that is, the descendants of Ali ibn Abi Talib (d. 661), the first Shia Imam. An Alid himself, Ali al-Hadi was also less restricted in this period. He engaged in teaching in Medina after reaching adulthood, possibly attracting a large number of students from Iraq, Persia, and Egypt, where the House of Muhammad traditionally found the most support. An account by Ibrahim ibn Mahziyar al-Ahwazi describes a visit to Ali al-Hadi in 228 AH (842–843) to deliver some goods, accompanied by his brother Ali. The two brothers were both trusted associates of al-Jawad. According to the Islamicist Shona F. Wardrop, this may be an indication of the young Ali beginning to renew links with the loyal followers of his father, al-Jawad. In the next five years, Ali al-Hadi successfully established contact with representatives from several regions. An account in Ithbat from this period might show the political awareness of the young Ali, even though it has been given a miraculous aspect in some other sources. This account is dated 232 AH (846–847) and narrated by a servant in the court of al-Wathiq, named Khayran al-Khadim, whom Ali al-Hadi inquires about the caliph's health. Khayran tells him that al-Wathiq is dying, adding that the general view is that he would be succeeded by his son. Ali, however, correctly predicts the accession of the caliph's brother Ja'far al-Mutawakkil (r. 847–861).

=== Reign of al-Mutawakkil (r. 847–861) ===
Partly due to renewed Zaydite Shia opposition, al-Mutawakkil persecuted Mu'tazilites and Shias, to the point that even Sunni sources have noted his hostility towards Shias. The caliph may have imposed the penalty of death by flagellation on anyone who defamed the companions or the wives of the prophet, some of whom are viewed negatively in Shia. He also openly cursed Ali ibn Abi Talib and ordered a clown to ridicule Ali in his banquets, writes the Twelver scholar Muhammad Husayn Tabatabai (d. 1981). By his orders, the shrine of Ali's son, Husayn ibn Ali (d. 680), was demolished in Karbala, water was turned upon the tomb, and the ground was plowed and cultivated to remove any trace of the tomb, so as to stop Shia pilgrimages to the site, which he also outlawed.

The campaign of arrests and torture by al-Mutawakkil in 846 led to the deaths of some associates of Ali al-Hadi in Baghdad, al-Mada'in, Kufa, and the Sawad. These were replaced by new representatives, including Hasan ibn Rashid and Ayyub ibn Nuh. The policies of al-Mutawakkil also pushed many Alids in the Hejaz and Egypt into destitution. The caliph is said to have punished those who traded with the Alids, thus isolating them financially. The village of Fadak, which had previously been returned to the Alids by al-Ma'mun, was now confiscated by al-Mutawakkil and awarded to a descendant of the early caliph Umar (r. 634–644), named as Abd Allah ibn Umar al-Bazyar. The caliph also dismissed officials suspected of Shia sympathies, including the governor of Saymara and Sirawan in the province of Jibal. As the governor of the holy cities in the Hejaz, al-Mutawakkil appointed Umar ibn Faraj, who prevented Alids from answering religious inquiries or accepting gifts, thus pushing them into poverty. The caliph also created a new army, known as Shakiriyya, which recruited from anti-Alid areas, such as Syria, al-Jazira (Upper Mesopotamia), the Jibal, the Hejaz, and from the Abna, a pro-Abbasid ethnic group. He implemented these policies with the help of his officials, particularly Ahmad ibn al-Khasib al-Jarjara'i (d. 879) and al-Fath ibn Khaqan (d. 861).

==== Summoned to Samarra (c. 848) ====
It was during the caliphate of al-Mutawakkil that the governor of Medina, Abd Allah ibn Muhammad, wrote to the caliph and warned him about the subversive activities of al-Hadi, claiming that he had concealed arms and books for his followers. Alternatively, Ithbat attributes the affair to Burahya al-Abbasi, the leader of prayers in Medina, who may have advised the caliph to remove al-Hadi from the city because he was allegedly agitating against the caliph. When al-Hadi learned about the allegations, he too wrote to al-Mutawakkil and defended himself. The caliph responded respectfully but also requested that he with his family relocate to the new Abbasid capital of Samarra, a garrison town where the Turkish guards were stationed, north of Baghdad. This letter also announced the dismissal of Abd Allah from his post in Medina, and is recorded in Kitab al-Irshad and Kitab al-Kafi, a comprehensive collection of Shia hadiths by the prominent Twelver scholar Muhammad ibn Ya'qub al-Kulayni (d. 941). The Islamicist Wilferd Madelung suggests that the letter is authentic, while Wardrop views the reverential and conciliatory tone of the letter as an indication that the caliph was cautious not to provoke an Alid rebellion in Medina, even though there is no evidence that al-Hadi actually intended to revolt. The Muslim academic Jassim M. Hussain suggests that al-Hadi was summoned to Samarra and held there because the investigations of caliph's officials, including Abd Allah, had linked the Shia Imam to the underground activities of the Imamites in Baghdad, al-Mada'in, and Kufa. The caliph thus decided to follow the policy of his predecessor, al-Ma'mun, who had attached the imams al-Rida and al-Jawad to his court in order to monitor and restrict them.

The caliph's letter was probably dated Jumada II 233 AH (January 848), but transmitted incorrectly as Jumada II 243 AH (October 857) by al-Mofid, the author of al-Irshad. Both Wardrop and Madelung consider the latter date unlikely, while the first date is also corroborated by Bihar, which states that al-Hadi spent twenty years of his life in Samarra. The escort who accompanied al-Hadi to Samarra is named variously in different sources as Yahya ibn Harthama, Yahya ibn Hubayra, or Attab ibn Abi Attab. The account of al-Mas'udi adds that this escort searched the residence of al-Hadi in Medina, without finding any evidence of subversion. He also calmed the public disorder by ensuring the locals that al-Hadi would not be harmed. A similar report is given by the Sunni historian Ibn Khallikan (d. 1282).

==== Life in the Abbasid court ====
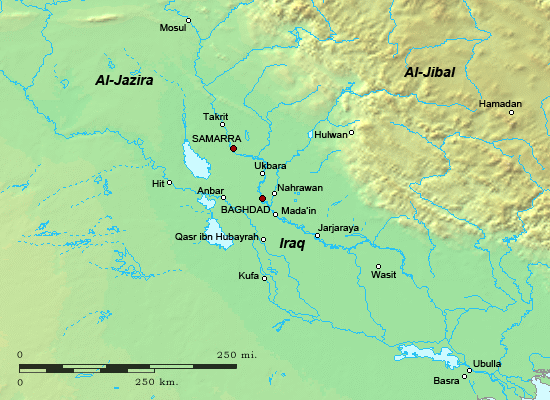
Map of Iraq and surrounding regions in the mid-ninth century

A more detailed map of the Abbasid capital Samarra and surrounding regions in the ninth century

When al-Hadi approached Baghdad, people gathered to see him and he was received warmly by the governor, Ishaq ibn Ibrahim al-Mus'abi, who welcomed him outside of the city. Later, when al-Hadi arrived in Samarra on 23 Ramadan 233 AH (1 May 848), the caliph did not immediately receive him but assigned a house for him, located in the al-Askar (lit. 'the army') quarter of the city, which was mostly occupied by the army. More specifically, his residence was in the center of the city on Abi Ahmad Street. Having escorted al-Hadi to Samarra, Yahya conveyed to the caliph the recommendations of al-Tahiri and the Turkish commander Wasif al-Turki, which apparently convinced the caliph to treat al-Hadi honorably. Still, there is a report that al-Hadi was temporarily placed under house arrest after his arrival in Samarra.

Ali al-Hadi lived in Samarra under constant surveillance until his death, some twenty years later. Among modern authors, Edward D. A. Hulmes, Moojan Momen, Hamid Mavani, and Reza Aslan liken al-Hadi to a prisoner in this period. In particular, he could rarely meet with ordinary Shias, as suggested by the scarcity of such reports in the early sources. For instance, Bihar describes a group of eager visitors for al-Hadi, who nevertheless had no idea what their imam looked like. The reports about this period depict a persecuted al-Hadi, who suffered frequent attempts by al-Mutawakkil and others at the court to belittle and dishonor him. More seriously, there is some evidence that al-Mutawakkil at least once attempted to kill al-Hadi during this period. Tabatabai and the Muslim academic Abdulaziz Sachedina go further, writing that the caliph on multiple occasions was intent on killing al-Hadi and had his house searched. Sachedina believes that fear of public unrest prevented al-Mutawakkil from killing al-Hadi, who was recognized by this time as a pious and learned figure.

In contrast, Madelung quotes al-Hadi as saying that he had not come to Samarra voluntarily but would never leave the city, as he liked its good water and air. His view is that al-Hadi was allowed to move freely within the city, and continued to send (written) instructions for his representatives across the Abbasid empire and receive through them the donations of Shias. Sachedina views this freedom of movement as an indication that al-Hadi did not pose a serious threat, while Wardrop suggests that the passive spiritual excellence of the Shia Imams was probably considered a more serious threat than an armed rebellion which could be easily crushed.

That al-Hadi remained in contact with his followers is also the opinion of the Islamicists Farhad Daftary, Sachedina, and Hussain, but the last author believes that al-Hadi sent and received his messages with secrecy, under the watchful eyes of the caliph. For Wardrop, a certain cycle of honor and suspicion was probably inevitable at the court of al-Mutawakkil. Still, in the case of al-Hadi as a Shia Imam with an active following, the image offered by Twelver sources is heavily tilted towards suspicion and persecution. Wardrop also notes that most reports about al-Hadi are attributed to this period, perhaps because al-Hadi was more "newsworthy" in Samarra, being close both to the center of power and to the large Shia population of Iraq. In her view, many of these reports might be exaggerated but they are likely based on truth and thus unwise to ignore.

==== Sample reports from the period ====
Wardrop also studies a few representative accounts about al-Hadi from this period: Kitab al-Kafi reports that al-Mutawakkil ordered to search the residence of al-Hadi at night on a tip by al-Batha'i, an Alid supporter of the caliph. The search did not turn any evidence of subversive activities and the money seized was later returned to al-Hadi. After the search, a relieved al-Mutawakkil invited al-Hadi to drink wine with him late at night. The latter refused and instead recited some poetry, the moral theme of which moved the caliph to tears. Accounts of futile searches appear also in Muruj by al-Mas'udi and in Wafayat al-a'yan by Ibn Khallikan. Shortly before the overthrow of al-Mutawakkil in 861, a temporary imprisonment of al-Hadi is reported in I'lam by the Twelver historian al-Tabarsi (d. 1153) and in Bihar, under the custody of one Ali ibn Karkar. The caliph may have ordered his close advisor Ibn Khaqan to poison the imprisoned al-Hadi. Also dated 861, the biographical al-Khara'ij by the Twelver scholar Qutb al-Din al-Rawandi (d. 1178) similarly reports a house arrest of al-Hadi under Sa'id al-Hajib, who was allegedly ordered to kill the Imam. In his report, a visitor finds al-Hadi seated next to an open grave in his house but is reassured by him that he would not be harmed because al-Mutawakkil would die shortly. Ithbat reports that the prayer of al-Hadi in the palace was once interrupted by a member of the court who accused him of hypocrisy. In an official banquet to which he was invited, al-Hadi silenced a man who continued to loudly interrupt him by predicting his imminent death, reports Bihar. A report on the authority of Zurara, a member of the court, states that the caliph offered a reward to anyone who would embarrass al-Hadi. The offer was taken up by an Indian knowledgeable of various sleights of hand, the report continues, who arranged for the loaves of bread to move away when al-Hadi reached for them, bringing the crowd to laughter. Bihar reports that al-Mutawakkil temporarily forbade his staff from serving al-Hadi, advised by a relative nicknamed Harisa, who warned the caliph that this was boosting the political image of al-Hadi among people. This Twelver report has a miraculous ending with the caliph abandoning his policy after an unexpected breeze blew the curtains open for al-Hadi instead of the guards.

=== Later years (861–868) ===
Ali al-Hadi continued to live in Samarra after the assassination of al-Mutawakkil in 861, through the short reign of al-Muntasir (r. 861–862), followed by four years of al-Musta'in (r. 862–866), and until his death in 868 during the caliphate of al-Mu'tazz (r. 866–869). In particular, al-Muntasir and al-Musta'in somewhat relaxed the anti-Alid policies of al-Mutawakkil, and al-Hadi thus lived more freely in those years. For instance, al-Muntasir apparently returned Fadak to the Alids and allowed them to visit the tomb of Husayn. Still, under al-Musta'in, his governor of Egypt arrested the Alid leader Ibn Abi Hudra, and deported him and his supporters to Iraq in 862, according to the Sunni historian Muhammad ibn Yusuf al-Kindi (d. 961). Also in Egypt, a follower of al-Hadi by the name of Muhammad ibn Hajar was killed and the estate of another follower, Saif ibn al-Layth, was confiscated by the ruler, according to al-Kulayni. Elsewhere, some supporters of al-Hadi were arrested in Samarra, while his main agent in Kufa, Ayyub ibn Nuh, was prosecuted by the local judge (qadi).

On the other hand, Hussain writes that Alid revolts broke out in 864–865 in Kufa, Tabaristan, Rayy, Qazvin, Egypt, and the Hejaz. He adds that the rebel leader in Mecca was an Imamite named Muhammad ibn Ma'ruf al-Hilali (d. 864), while the Kufan rebel leader Yahya ibn Umar (d. 864) was praised by Abu Hashim al-Ja'fari, an agent of al-Hadi. Later under al-Mu'tazz, the Abbasids discovered connections between some rebels in Tabaristan and Rayy and certain Imamite figures close to al-Hadi, who were thus arrested in Baghdad and deported to Samarra. These included Muhammad ibn Ali al-Attar, Abu Hashim al-Ja'fari, and apparently the two sons of al-Hadi, namely, Hasan and Ja'far. More such links to al-Hadi are listed by the Sunni historian al-Tabari (d. 923). Hussain suggests that all this paved the way for the murder of al-Hadi by the Abbasids during the caliphate of al-Mu'tazz. It is also the view of Sachedina that the restrictions on al-Hadi were renewed under al-Mu'tazz, who is accused by Shia sources of murdering al-Hadi.

== Death (868) ==
According to both al-Tabari and al-Kulayni, al-Hadi died on 26 Jumada II 254 AH (21 June 868) at the age of about forty and during the caliphate of al-Mu'tazz. Other reported dates fall in Jumada II and Rajab 254 AH (June–July 868). In particular, 3 Rajab is annually commemorated by Shias for this occasion. Most Shia authors record that he was poisoned by the Abbasids. The exceptions are al-Mufid, who is silent about the cause of death of al-Hadi, the Shia-leaning historian al-Ya'qubi (d. 897-8), who writes that he died mysteriously, and al-Isfahani, who does not list al-Hadi among the Alid martyrs in his biographical Maqatil al-Talibiyyin. Among modern authors, Tabatabai holds that al-Hadi was poisoned at the instigation of al-Mu'tazz, while Hussain links the murder of al-Hadi to the Abbasids discovering his connections to the ongoing Shia revolts. In contrast, Momen says that the "real power" was in the hands of the Turkish generals by the time al-Hadi died and that the murder of al-Hadi would have had no political benefit for the caliph. The manner of his death is also given differently by the sources.

In addition to al-Hadi, Shia sources hold the Abbasids responsible for the deaths of multiple Shia Imams. The silence of Sunni sources here is attributed by Shia authors to the atmosphere of fear and intimidation under the Abbasids. In particular, the Twelver traditionist Ibn Shahrashub (d. 1192) said that he wrote his Manaqib Ale Abi Talib "to bring forth what they [the Sunnis] have suppressed." There is also a tradition attributed to Muhammad al-Baqir (d. 732), the fifth of the Twelve Imams, to the effect that none of them would escape an unjust death after attaining fame, except their last, whose birth would be concealed from the public. A similar tradition is ascribed to al-Rida, the eighth of the Twelve Imams, this time in response to a follower who had expressed his hope to see the Imam in power because "people have paid allegiance to" al-Rida and "coins have been struck" in his name.

The funeral prayer is said to have been led by al-Muwaffaq (d. 891), a brother of the caliph. A large number of mourners, however, forced the family to bring the body of al-Hadi back to the house, where he was then buried. The house was later expanded to a major shrine by various Shia and Sunni patrons. More recently, the complex was rebuilt in 1868–1869 at the request of Naser al-Din Shah Qajar (r. 1848–1896), ruler of Persia and a Twelver, and the golden dome was added in 1905. In addition to al-Hadi, the shrine also houses the tombs of his son, Hasan al-Askari, and his sister, Hakima Khatun. As an important destination for Shia pilgrimage, the shrine was bombed in February 2006 and badly damaged. Another attack on 13 June 2007 destroyed the two minarets of the shrine. Iraqi authorities hold the Sunni extremist group al-Qaeda responsible for both attacks.

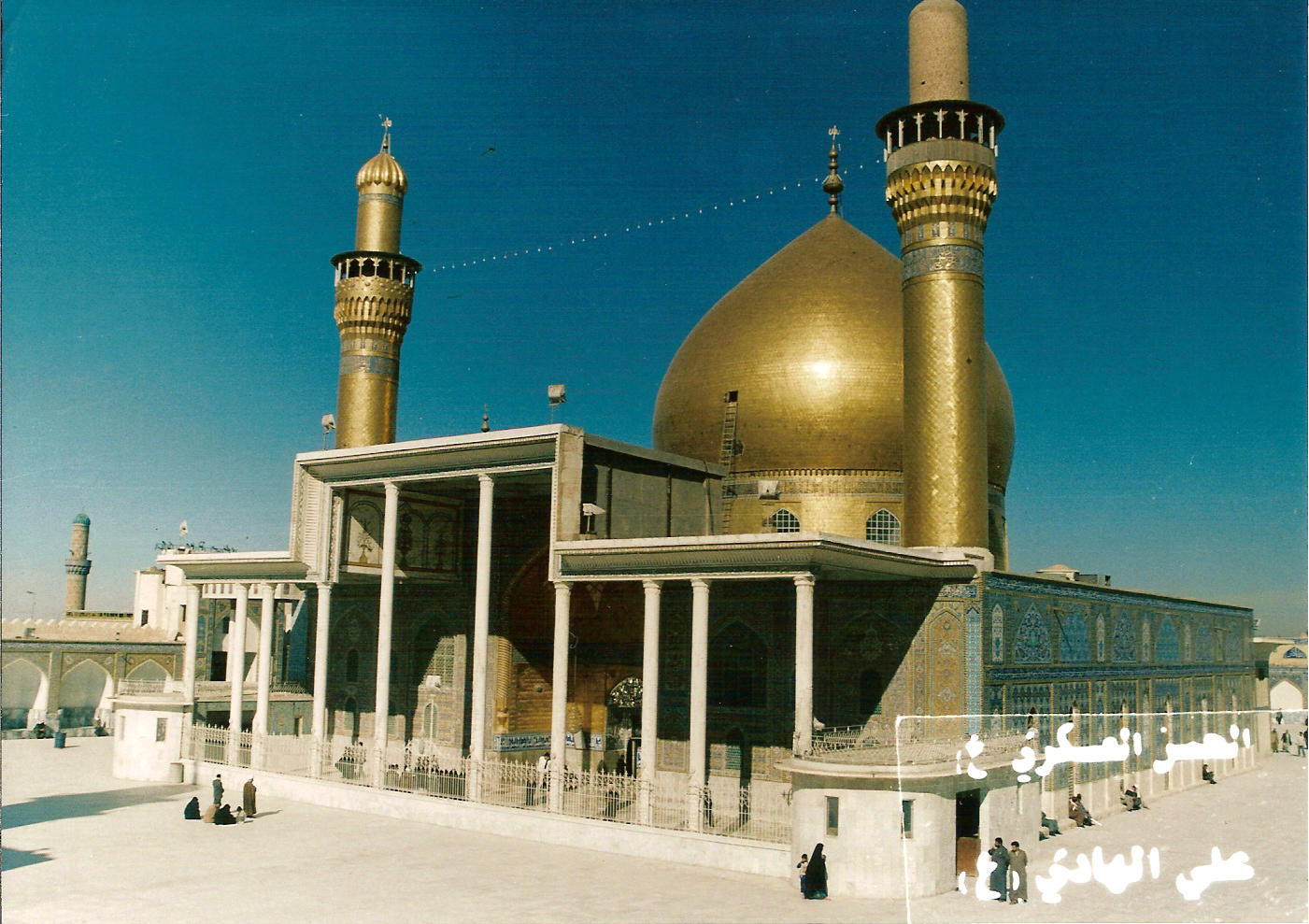
Al-Askari shrine in Samarra, located in modern-day Iraq, before the 2006 bombing

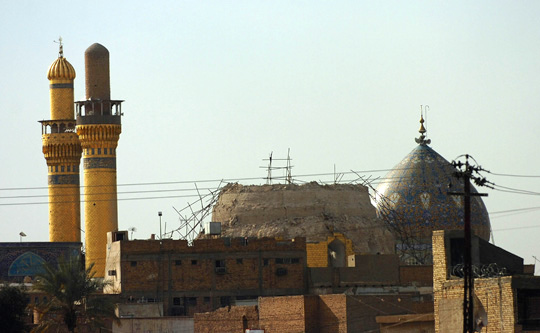
The shrine was damaged by bombings twice in 2006 and 2007.

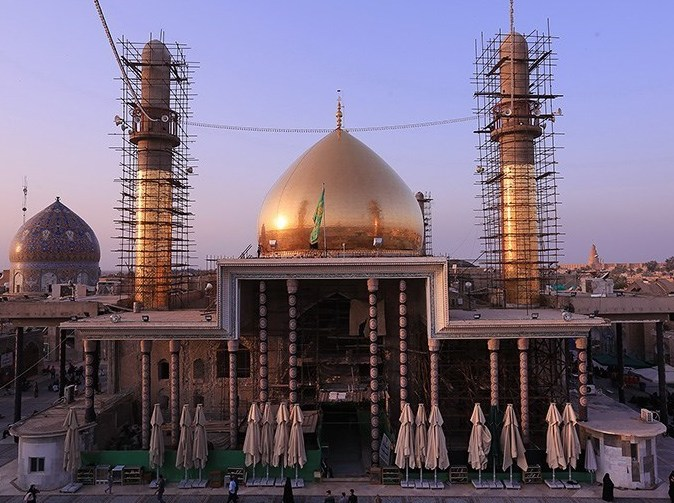
Al-Askari shrine in 2017, partially rebuilt after the bombings

== Personal traits ==
After accounting for the bias of his Twelver sources, the historian Dwight M. Donaldson (d. 1976) writes that al-Hadi comes across to him as a "good-tempered, quiet man", who endured for years the "hatred" of al-Mutawakkil with dignity and patience. For Wardrop, the image of al-Hadi in Shia sources is that of a "pacifist, persecuted Imam", who always remains unmoved by his enemies' attempts to "humiliate and attack him". In these reports, she adds, al-Hadi maintains a detached and dignified pose in threatening situations, thus impressing upon others the certitude of his belief in the protection of God. In such situations, the response of al-Hadi in Shia sources is often to invoke the intervention of God through prayer, for he viewed the "invocation of oppressed against the oppressor" more powerful than "cavalry, weapons, or spirits", in a tradition attributed to him in Bihar. To showcase what she describes as the detachment of al-Hadi from "the trivial anxieties of al-dunya [the material world]", Wardrop mentions the account of an occasion when his house was searched at night for money and weapons, as given by the Twelver sources al-Kafi, al-Irshad, and I'lam. By this account, the soldiers who broke into his house found him praying and he then helped them in their search. After this futile search and similar episodes, al-Hadi again invokes the power of God in Shia sources rather than indulging in "verbal attack or enraged silence".

== Imamate ==
=== Designation ===
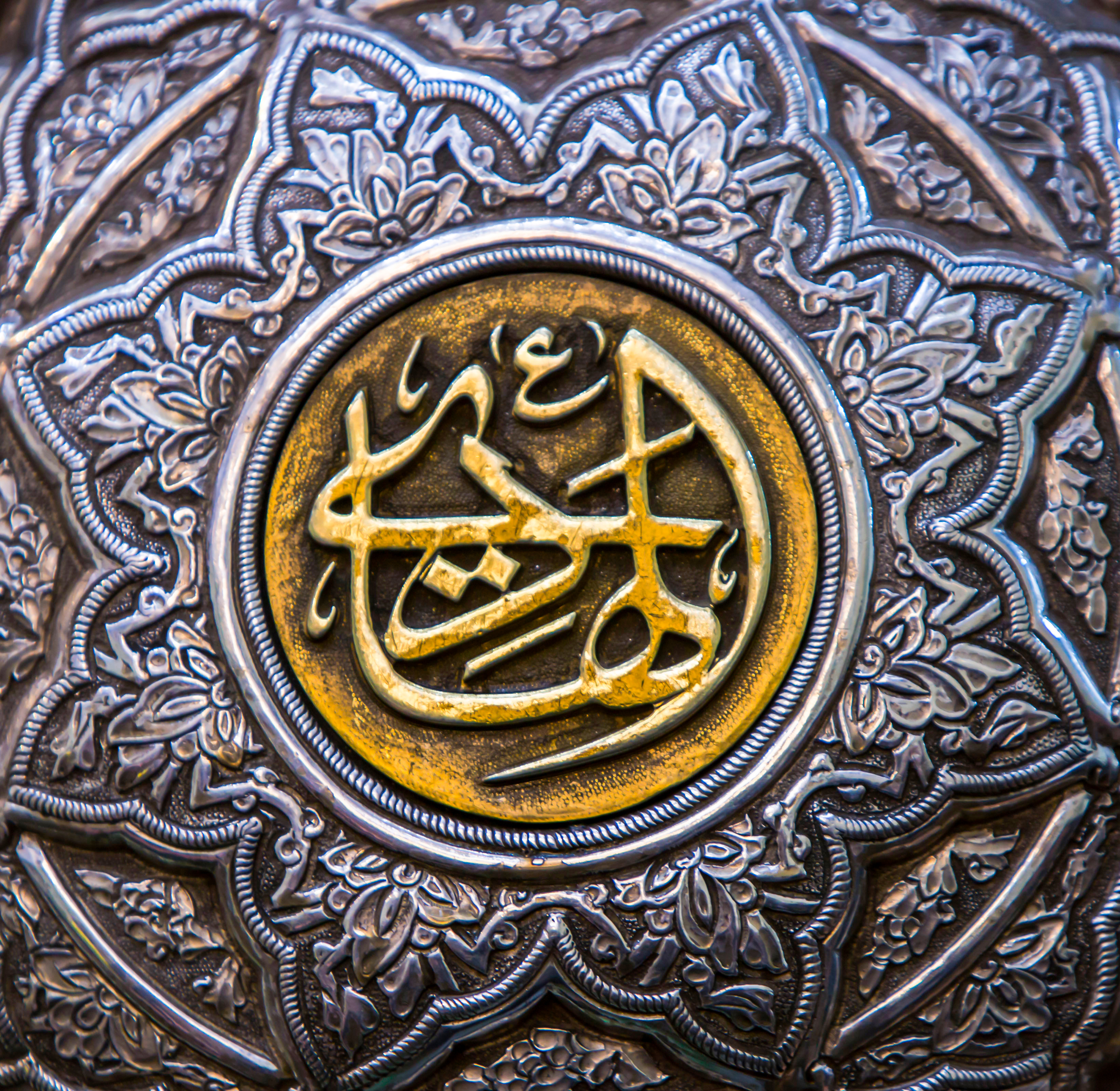
Calligraphic inscription of al-Hadi's name on the zarih of Husayn ibn Ali, located in Karbala

After the death of al-Jawad in 835, most of his followers acknowledged his son Ali as the next Imam. As with his father, Ali al-Hadi was still a minor when he succeeded to the imamate at the age of about seven. Thanks to the precedent of al-Jawad, however, the imamate of Ali was widely accepted without much demur, even though in both cases the inner circle of their predecessors must have played a visible role in consolidating their imamate. The only account about the succession of Ali al-Hadi is given by multiple sources, including al-Kafi, al-Irshad, and Bihar. By this account, the designation (nass) was orally delivered to one Abu al-Khayrani by al-Jawad, who thus appointed his son Ali as his successor. Wardrop identifies this person as Ahmad ibn Hammad al-Marwazi, who was close to al-Jawad, while elsewhere he is named as Khayran al-Khadim, a servant of al-Jawad. At any rate, Abu al-Khayrani then wrote to a few notable Imamite figures with the news of this designation, with instructions to open the letters if he died. The oral designation was also overheard by Ahmad ibn Muhammad ibn Isa, a reputable Imamite from Qom, who happened to be there to inquire about the health of al-Jawad.

When al-Jawad died, Ahmad met with Muhammad ibn al-Faraj al-Rukhaji and ten other unnamed Imamite figures and listened to Abu al-Khayrani. Of these, Muhammad was a representative of al-Jawad, who came to the forefront after his death. Indeed, the meeting took place at Muhammad's house and it was him who invited Abu al-Khayrani to join them. At the meeting, the claim of Abu al-Khayrani was reluctantly corroborated by Ahmad, who said he preferred the honor to have gone to an Arab rather than a non-Arab (ajam). After some contemplation, the group accepted the imamate of Ali, the report concludes. More evidence is found in the will attributed to al-Jawad in Kitab al-Kafi, which stipulates that his son Ali would inherit from him and be responsible for his younger brother, Musa, and his sisters. For the Muslim jurist and academic Hossein Modarressi, the account of his succession suggests that the seniority of Ali over his brother was not sufficient and the Shia community had to be convinced that Ali was directly appointed by his father. A small group initially followed Musa as their imam but soon returned to Ali al-Hadi after Musa dissociated himself from them.

=== Representatives ===
Bernheimer considers the imamate of al-Hadi as a turning point for Shia: the direct leadership of the Shia community by the Imams effectively ended by al-Hadi's summons to Samarra, where he was held under constant surveillance by the Abbasid caliphs until his death. Still, similar to his predecessors, al-Hadi secretly communicated with an underground network of representatives (wokala, sing. wakil), who were responsible for the financial and religious affairs of the Imamite Shias, and particularly for the collection of religious dues, such as Khums (lit. 'one-fifth'). These agents gradually took over the function of guiding and organizing the Shia community, following the same principle of political quietism to which the Shia Imams adhered. Their efforts seem to have been divided into four geographic areas; the first one included Baghdad, Mada'in, the Sawad, and Kufa, the second area included Basra and Ahwaz, the third included Qom and Hamadan, and the fourth included the Hejaz, Yemen, and Egypt. Each of these four areas was entrusted to an agent, who was also responsible for appointing local agents within his area.

Imamite sources also describe some failed attempts by the Abbasids to intercept the agents, including feigned sympathy by Ibn Khaqan to infiltrate the network or last-minute aborted missions of the agents. Nevertheless, there were waves of crackdowns by al-Mutawakkil in 850 and by al-Mustai'n in 862. Some of the arrested agents died under torture while others were imprisoned. Among the trusted agents of al-Hadi were Ali ibn Mahziar Ahvazi, (Note: He was the agent of al-Jawad and later al-Hadi in Ahwaz. He wrote two books, namely, Kitab al-Malahim and Kitab al-Qa'im, both about occultation. The two sons of Ali ibn Mahziar, named Ibrahim and Muhammad, later served in Ahwaz as the representatives of Muhammad al-Mahdi.) Uthman ibn Sa'id al-Asadi, (Note: He was appointed as an agent of al-Hadi in Baghdad, served as an agent of Hasan al-Askari after al-Hadi, and was later recognized as the first of the Four Deputies of Muhammad al-Mahdi, the last Imam in Twelver Shia. His son Muhammad is considered to be the second deputy of al-Mahdi.) Ahmad ibn Ishaq al-Ash'ari, Ali ibn Bil'al, (Note: He was a representative of al-Hadi based in Wasit, even though he was originally from Baghdad. He was also earlier a follower of al-Jawad and later a loyal supporter of al-Askari. The contemporary Imamite traditionist Muhammad ibn Ahmad ibn Yahya transmitted from al-Hadi on the authority of Ali ibn Bil'al.) Ibrahim ibn Muhammad al-Hamadani, (Note: He was the agent of al-Hadi in Hamadan and his descendants continued to serve the following Imams in the same capacity.) Ali ibn Ja'far al-Hamani, Ayyub ibn Nuh, Hasan ibn Rashid, and Muhammad ibn al-Faraj al-Rukhaji. (Note: He was a follower of al-Rida and an agent of both al-Jawad and al-Hadi. He is also considered a trustworthy transmitter of hadiths in Shia. Indeed, he reported from al-Kazim and wrote the book Kitab al-Masa'il which was transmitted by Ahmad ibn Hilal. It was apparently at his house that Shia figures met after the death of al-Jawad and recognized the imamate of his son, al-Hadi. Later al-Hadi warned him in a letter about the hostility of al-Mutawakkil and Muhammad was soon enough jailed and his properties were confiscated. When he was released after eight years in prison, he asked al-Hadi for his help in restoring his possessions. The Imam responded warmly but also added that those properties would be of no benefit to Muhammad. Indeed, he soon died.) Because of the underground nature of this network, there were also probably some who falsely claimed to represent al-Hadi. In particular, Faris ibn Hatim ibn Mahawayh al-Qazvini was initially a representative of al-Hadi and his intermediary with the Imamites living in the Jibal, which encompassed the central and western parts of modern-day Iran. Faris was involved in a dispute with Ali ibn Ja'far around 862 and was consequently banned by al-Hadi from receiving alms on his behalf. He continued to do so, however, without forwarding them to al-Hadi, who excommunicated Faris in 864 for embezzling religious dues. As Faris continued to openly incite against al-Hadi, the latter called for his death, and he was indeed assassinated during the imamate of Hasan al-Askari.

=== Miracles ===
In Twelver Shia, al-Hadi is considered knowledgeable in the languages of the Persians, Slavs, Indians, and Nabataeans. Similarly, al-Tabarsi writes that al-Hadi was articulate in seventy-three languages, probably in reference to the hadith, attributed to Muhammad, that his community would be split to seventy-three groups. This was not unique to al-Hadi, however, and miracles of speech are attributed to all Shia Imams. One of the many such accounts about al-Hadi is narrated by Ibrahim ibn Mahziyar, who describes a meeting with a young al-Hadi in 228 AH (842–843) in the company of his brother Ali and their servant Masrur, whom the following day al-Hadi sent for and spoke to in his native language of Persian.

Ali al-Hadi is also credited in Twelver sources with predicting the death of al-Mutawakkil, who had either imprisoned or humiliated al-Hadi. The variations of this account appear in the Twelver sources Bihar, al-Khara'ij, Ithbat, and Uyun al-mu'jizat. His precognition is also highlighted in another account, appearing in Bihar for instance, according to which al-Hadi already knew the religious question of his visitors. Narrated by Ishaq ibn Abd-Allah al-Alawi, a distant relative of al-Hadi, the question was about the significance of fasting on the birthdate of the Islamic prophet, the day he received his divine message, the day on which the earth was flattened, and the day of the Ghadir Khumm. In this vein, Ali al-Hadi showed a companion a vision of heaven, according to al-Irshad. On one occasion, Bihar describes that the soldiers tasked with killing al-Hadi did not dare to harm him because of "his awe-inspiring presence", seeing around him a hundred raised swords. In the presence of al-Mutawakkil, al-Hadi debunked the claim of a woman who pretended to be Zaynab bint Ali, daughter of Ali ibn Abi Talib. He reputedly did so by descending into the caliph's den of lions to prove that they do not harm true descendants of Ali ibn Abi Talib. This the woman refused to imitate. It is also said that al-Hadi brought to life a picture of a lion on a carpet, which then ate a juggler who had attempted to humiliate the Imam with his tricks by order of al-Mutawakkil. Another tradition states that he turned a handful of sand into gold for the poor. When he set out for Samarra, despite clear skies, al-Hadi prepared for heavy rain which indeed materialized within a few hours to the amazement of his escort. When asked about it, however, al-Hadi rejected any miraculous interpretation of the incident, saying that he had simply recognized the signs of a brewing storm as a native, as reported in al-Muruj by al-Mas'udi.

=== Succession ===
Ali al-Hadi was survived by two sons, namely, Ja'far ibn Ali al-Hadi and his older brother Hasan al-Askari. The latter was born in Medina to an umm walad, whose name is variously given in different sources as Hudayth, Susan, or Salil. After al-Hadi, the majority of his followers acknowledged as their next imam his adult son Hasan, who is commonly known by the title al-Askari (lit. 'military') on account of his almost life-long detention in the garrison town of Samarra, after moving there with his father as a child. Imamite sources report that al-Hadi designated Hasan as his successor a month before his death in 868. This appointment came after the death of his eldest son Muhammad ibn Ali al-Hadi, whom some expected to be the next Imam.

After the death of al-Hadi, his other son Ja'far unsuccessfully claimed the imamate for himself, and he is thus referred to as Ja'far al-Kadhab (lit. 'Ja'far, the liar') in the Imamite sources. Some apparently considered Ja'far particularly unfit for the position because of his poor reputation. The death of Muhammad and the poor reputation of Ja'far thus facilitated the accession of Hasan. He was, however, unknown to many Imamites, as suggested by Ithbat, and the representatives of al-Hadi must have played an important role in consolidating the imamate of Hasan. Still, some considered al-Hadi to be the last Imam and Hasan is said to have written to Imamite figures across the Abbasid empire to dispel their doubts about his imamate.

When Hasan al-Askari died without an obvious heir in 874, some of his followers rejected his imamate, because the Imam could not be childless, as they argued. Among them, the now-extinct Muhammadites contended that Muhammad ibn Ali al-Hadi must have been the rightful eleventh Imam, even though he had predeceased his father. For them, Muhammad was the Mahdi, the messianic figure in Islam to (re)appear at the end of times to eradicate injustice and evil. Probably related to this group was Ibn Nusayr, who considered Ali al-Hadi to be divine and claimed to be his prophet. He is considered the founder of the Nusayris, a now-extinct Ghali sect of Shia. The Ghulat (lit. 'exaggerators') believed in the divinity of the Shia Imams.

==== Ja'farites ====
Those who accepted the imamate of Ja'far, the youngest son of al-Hadi, are known as Ja'farites. Its members arrived at this claim in different ways. One faction turned to Ja'far after the death of his brother Hasan al-Askari in 874, who did not leave an obvious heir. Another subgroup of Ja'farites believed that al-Askari himself had designated Ja'far as his successor. Notable among them was the Kufan theologian Ali ibn Tahi (or Talhi) al-Khazzaz. This Ali ranked among the Fathites, many of whom thus joined the Ja'farites. Yet another subgroup held that Ja'far was directly designated by his father al-Hadi as his successor. A different subgroup was the Nafisites, who believed that al-Hadi was to be succeeded by his eldest son Muhammad. Before his death in the lifetime of al-Hadi, they say, Muhammad designated his youngest brother Ja'far as his successor, skipping the older Hasan. More specifically, they believed that Muhammad entrusted his testament to his servant Nafis, who passed it on to Ja'far. The latter thus claimed he was the successor to Muhammad. Nafis himself was killed.

Similarly, some followers of Faris ibn Hatim claimed that he was succeeded by his son Muhammad, who appointed his brother Ja'far as the next Imam before his death during the lifetime of al-Hadi. They accordingly accepted the imamate of Ja'far instead of al-Askari. This was apparently an act of defiance to Hasan al-Askari, who had sided with his father al-Hadi when he excommunicated Faris for embezzling religious funds and openly inciting against him. In any case, Ja'far soon died and some then turned to his descendants for leadership. The Ja'farites were nevertheless extinct by 373 AH (983-4), as some converted to the mainstream Twelver Shia and some emigrated to Egypt or elsewhere and joined Sufi orders.

== Works ==
A theological treatise on free will and various short texts are attributed to al-Hadi and quoted in Tuhaf al-Uqul, a Twelver collection of hadiths. According to Mavani, most Shia hadiths about Khums are also attributed to al-Hadi and his predecessor, al-Jawad. Some regard Khums as an example of the Imams' discretionary authority as religious and temporal Shia leaders, which in this case countered the redirection of Zakat (another Islamic alms) "to sustain the oppressors [the caliphs] and to secure their affluent lifestyle", according to the Shia jurist Hussein-Ali Montazeri (d. 2009). One example is the response of al-Hadi to a letter from his new agent Hasan ibn Rashid, in which the former describes Khums as a levy on possessions and produce, and on traders and craftsmen, after they had provided for themselves. This last part is clarified in a letter from al-Hadi to another agent, named Ibrahim ibn Muhammad al-Hamadani, which explains that Khums is levied after providing for the land and for dependents, and after the kharaj (land tax) for the ruler.

Donaldson quotes one of the prophetic traditions related on the authority of al-Hadi, through Ali ibn Abi Talib, which defines faith (iman) as contained in the hearts of men, confirmed by their deeds (a'mal), whereas surrender (islam) is what the tongue expresses which only validates the union. A hadith attributed to al-Hadi in al-Kafi predicts the occultation of his grandson, the twelfth Imam, and refers to him as al-hujja (lit. 'the proof') from the House of Muhammad. Mavani quotes another hadith, ascribed to al-Hadi and transmitted by al-Tabarsi, as follows:

After the occultation of your Qa'im, a group of the religious scholars (ulama) will call people to believe in his [al-Qa'im's] imamate and defend his religion by using proofs sent by Allah so that they might save the weak-minded faithful from either the deceptions of Satan and his followers or the deceptions of the anti-Alids (al-nawasib). If none of these ulama remain, then everyone will stray from the religion of Allah. However, as the pilot holds the rudder of the ship, the ulama will hold firmly onto the hearts of the weak-minded Shia, preventing them from straying. Those ulama are the most excellent in the view of Allah the Exalted.

== See also ==
- Hasan al-Askari
- Sadaat Amroha
- Jafar ibn Ali al-Hadi

== Bibliography ==
- Adamec, Ludwig W. (2017). Historical Dictionary of Islam (Third ed.). Rowman & Littlefield. ISBN 9781442277236.
- Amir-Moezzi, Mohammad Ali (1994). The Divine Guide in Early Shi'ism - The Sources of Esotericism in Islam. State University of New York Press. ISBN 9780585069722.
- Aslan, Reza (2008). No god But God - The Origins, Evolution and Future of Islam. Random House. ISBN 9781407009285.
- Baghestani, Esmail (2014). "Jawad, Imam". Encyclopaedia of the World of Islam (in Persian). Vol. 11. Encyclopaedia Islamica Foundation. ISBN 978-9644470127.
- Bernheimer, Teresa (2017). "ʿAlī l-Hādī". In Fleet, Kate; Krämer, Gudrun; Matringe, Denis; Nawas, John; Stewart, Devin J. (eds.). Encyclopaedia of Islam (Third ed.). Brill Publishers. doi:10.1163/1573-3912_ei3_COM_24990. ISBN 9789004335714.
- Blichfeldt, Jan-Olaf (1985). Early Mahdism - Politics and Religion in the Formative Period of Islam. Brill Publishers. ISBN 9789004076433.
- Daftary, Farhad (2013). A History of Shi'i Islam. I.B. Tauris. ISBN 9780755608669.
- Daftary, Farhad; Nanji, Azim (2014). "Twelver Shi'ism". In Fitzpatrick, Coeli; Walker, Adam Hani (eds.). Muhammad in History, Thought, and Culture - An Encyclopedia of the Prophet of God. Vol. 2. ABC-Clio. pp. 644–651. ISBN 9781610691772.
- Donaldson, Dwight M. (1933). The Shi'ite Religion - A History of Islam in Persia and Iraḳ. AMS Press. ISBN 9780598503787.
- Eliash, J. (2012). "Ḥasan al-ʿAskarī". In Bearman, P.; Bianquis, Th.; Bosworth, C.E.; van Donzel, E.; Heinrichs, W.P. (eds.). Encyclopaedia of Islam (Second ed.). Brill Publishers. doi:10.1163/1573-3912_islam_SIM_2762. ISBN 9789004161214.
- Esposito, John L., ed. (2004). The Oxford Dictionary of Islam. Oxford University Press. ISBN 9780199757268.
- Halm, Heinz (2001). "ḠOLĀT". Encyclopedia Iranica. Vol. XI/1. pp. 62–64. ISSN 2330-4804.
- Hulmes, Edward D. A. (2008). "'ALI AL-HADI". In Netton, Ian Richard (ed.). Encyclopedia of Islamic Civilisation and Religion. Routledge. p. 43. ISBN 9780700715886.
- Hussain, Jassim M. (1986). Occultation of the Twelfth Imam - A Historical Background. Routledge. ISBN 9780710301581.
- Lewis, B. (2012). "al-ʿAskarī". In Bearman, P.; Bianquis, Th.; Bosworth, C.E.; van Donzel, E.; Heinrichs, W.P. (eds.). Encyclopaedia of Islam (Second ed.). doi:10.1163/1573-3912_islam_SIM_0810. ISBN 9789004161214.
- Madelung, W. (1985). "'Alī al-Hādī". Encyclopaedia Iranica. Vol. I/8. pp. 861–862. ISSN 2330-4804.
- Madelung, W. (2012). "Muḥammad b. 'Alī al-Riḍā". In Bearman, P.; Bianquis, Th.; Bosworth, C.E.; van Donzel, E.; Heinrichs, W.P. (eds.). Encyclopaedia of Islam (Second ed.). doi:10.1163/1573-3912_islam_SIM_5343.
- Mavani, Hamid (2013). Religious Authority and Political Thought in Twelver Shi'ism - From Ali to Post-Khomeini. Routledge. ISBN 9780415624404.
- Medoff, Louis (2016). "Moḥammad al-Jawād, Abu Ja'far". Encyclopaedia Iranica (Online ed.). ISSN 2330-4804.
- Modarressi, Hossein (1993). Crisis and Consolidation in the Formative Period of Shi'ite Islam - Abu Ja'Far Ibn Qiba Al-Razi and His Contribution to Imamite Shi'Ite Thought. Darwin Press. ISBN 0878500952.
- Momen, Moojan (1985). An Introduction to Shi'i Islam. Yale University Press. ISBN 9780300034998.
- Northedge, Alastair (2006). "SAMARRA". In Meri, Josef W. (ed.). Medieval Islamic Civilization An Encyclopedia. Vol. 1. Routledge. pp. 694–697. ISBN 9780415966924.
- Pakatchi, Ahmad (2013). "Hassan Askari, Imam". Encyclopaedia of the World of Islam (in Persian). Vol. 20. Encyclopaedia Islamica Foundation. ISBN 9786006326191.
- Picken, Gavin (2008). "Shi'ism (Al-Shi'a)". In Netton, Ian Richard (ed.). Encyclopedia of Islamic Civilisation and Religion. Routledge. pp. 596–597. ISBN 9780700715886.
- Pierce, Matthew (2016). Twelve Infallible Men - The Imams and the Making of Shi'ism. Harvard University Press. ISBN 9780674737075.
- Sachedina, Abdulaziz Abdulhussein (1981). Islamic Messianism - The Idea of Mahdī in Twelver Shī'ism (PDF). State University of New York Press. ISBN 9780873954426.
- Sajjadi, Sadeq (2018). "Fadak". In Daftary, Farhad (ed.). Encyclopaedia Islamica. Translated by Khaleeli, Alexander. doi:10.1163/1875-9831_isla_COM_036126.
- Sourdel, D. (1970). "The ʿAbbasid Caliphate". In Holt, P.M.; Lambton, Ann K.S.; Lewis, Bernard (eds.). The Cambridge History of Islam, Volume 1A - The Central Islamic Lands from Pre-Islamic Times to the First World War. Cambridge University Press. pp. 104–139. LCCN 73-77291.
- Tabatabai, Sayyid Mohammad Hosayn (1975). Shi'ite Islam. Translated by Sayyid Hossein Nasr (First ed.). State University of New York Press. ISBN 0873953908.
- Wardrop, S. F. (1988). Lives of the Imams, Muhammad al-Jawad and Ali al-Hadi and the Development of the Shi'ite Organisation (PhD thesis). University of Edinburgh.

Ali al-Hadi an-Naqi of the Ahl al-Bayt Banu Hashim; Clan of the Banu Quraish Born: 15th Dhu'l-Hijja 212 AH ≈ 7 March 828 Died: 3rd Rajab 254 AH ≈ 21 June 868
Shia Islam titles
Preceded by Muhammad al-Jawad at-Taqi	10th Imam of Twelver Shia Islam; 835–868	Succeeded by Hasan al-Askari
Preceded by Muhammad al-Jawad at-Taqi	10th Imam of Twelver Shia Islam; 835–868	Succeeded by Muhammad ibn Ali al-Hadi; Muhammadite Shia successor
