= Hasan al-Askari =

Eleventh of the Twelve Shia Imams

Hasan al-Askari ٱلْحَسَن ٱلْعَسْكَرِيّ al-Samet
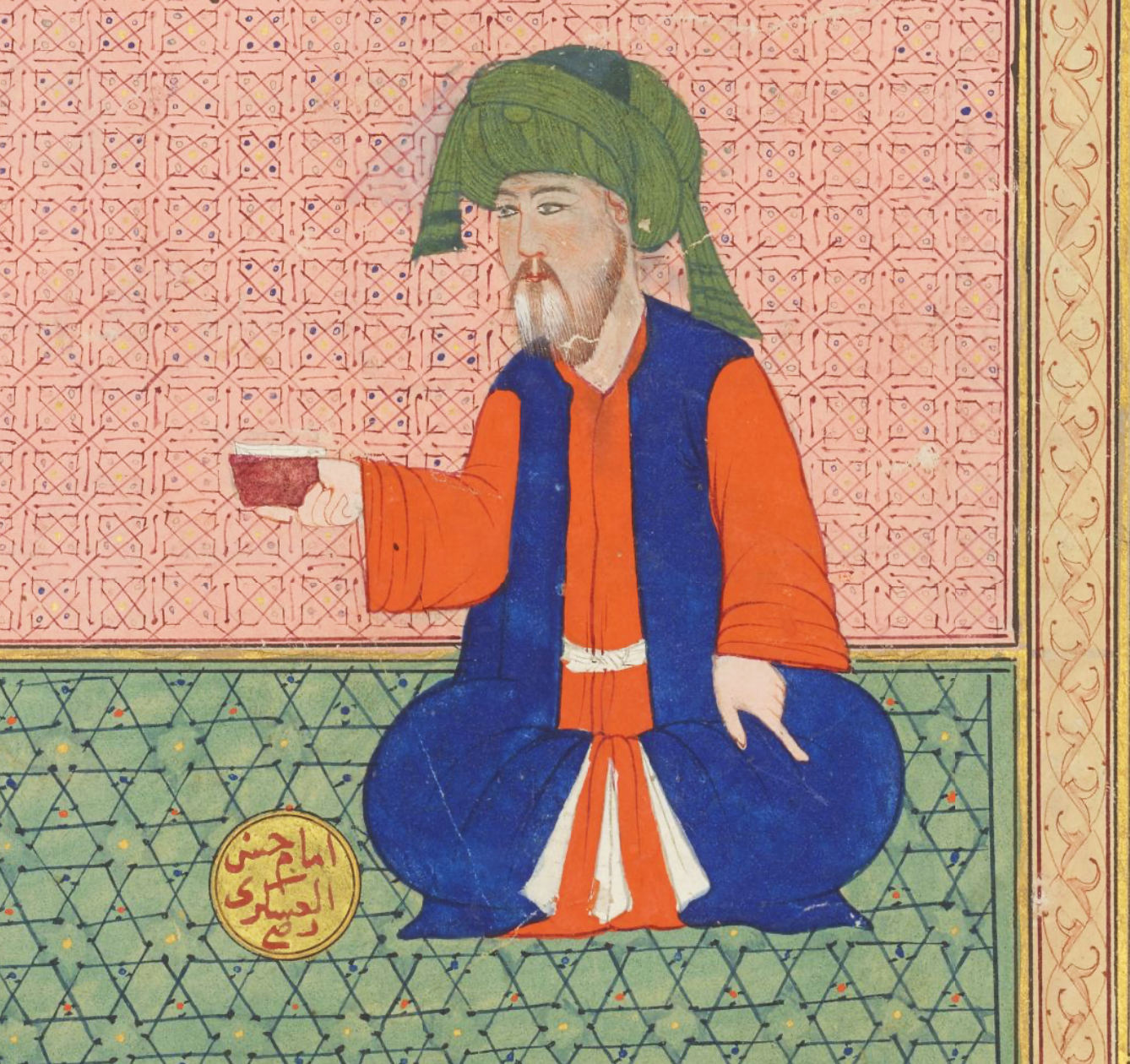
- 16th‑century Ottoman iconographic depiction of Hasan al-Askari

11th Shia Imam
- In office 868–874
- Preceded by: Ali al-Hadi
- Succeeded by: Muhammad al-Mahdi
- Title: al-ʿAskarī (“of the military garrison”)

Personal life
- Born: 8 Rabi' al-Thani 232 AH (c. 844) Medina, Abbasid Empire
- Died: 8 Rabi al-Awwal 260 AH (c. 1 January 874 (aged 27) Samarra, Abbasid Empire
- Cause of death: Poisoned (Note: Poisoned by the Abbasid official as per Twelver Shia sources)
- Resting place: Al-Askari shrine Samarra, Iraq; 34°11′54.5″N 43°52′25″E
- Spouse: Narjis (disputed)
- Children: Muhammad al-Mahdi
- Parents: Ali al-Hadi; Hudayth (or Susan or Salil)
- Relatives: Ja'far (brother); Muhammad (brother)

Religious life
- Religion: Islam
- Sect: Shia

Hasan al-Askari (Arabic: الحَسَن بْن عَلِيّ ٱلْعَسْكَرِيّ, romanized: al-Ḥasan ibn ʿAlī al-ʿAskarī; c. 844 – c. 874) was a descendant of the Islamic prophet Muhammad, the eleventh of the Twelve Imams, and father of Muhammad al-Mahdi. He was born in Medina in 844 and brought with his father, Ali al-Hadi, to the garrison town of Samarra in 848, where the Abbasid caliphs held them under close surveillance until their deaths, even though neither were politically active. After the death of al-Hadi in 868, the majority of his followers acknowledged his son, al-Askari, as the next Imam. Al-Askari's contact with Shia Muslims was restricted by the Abbasid caliphs, and he communicated with his followers through the network of representatives (Wokala). He died in Samarra in 873 at the age of about twenty-eight and was buried in the family home next to his father, which later developed into the Al-Askari Shrine, a holy site in Shia Islam.

Shia sources hold the Abbasids responsible for the death of al-Askari and his father. A well-known early Shia commentary of the Quran is attributed to al-Askari. Al-Askari died without leaving an heir, which created widespread confusion and fragmented the Shia Muslims into several sects, all of which either disappeared in a few decades or absorbed within the mainstream Twelver Shia Islam. The Twelvers hold that al-Askari had a son, named Muhammad al-Mahdi, who was kept hidden from the public out of fear of Abbasid persecution. He is identified as the Mahdi, the awaited messianic and eschatological figure who will reappear before the End Times by God's permission to fill the earth with justice alongside Isa (Jesus). Al-Mahdi succeeded to the Imamate after the death of his father al-Askari and entered occultation.

== Titles ==
Hasan ibn Ali is known by the titles al-Samet (lit. 'the quiet'), al-Hadi (lit. 'the guide'), and al-Zaki (lit. 'the pure'), though his most common title is al-Askari (lit. 'military')، on the account of his almost life-long detention in Samarra, a garrison town not far from Baghdad which was the capital of the Abbasids at the time. As a great-grandson of Ali al-Rida, the eighth of the Twelve Imams, Hasan was also known by his contemporaries as Ibn al-Rida (lit. '"son of al-Rida"').

== Life ==
=== Birth and early life ===
Most Shia sources state that Hasan ibn Ali was born in Rabi' al-Awwal 230 AH (November 844), though other given dates range from 845 to 847. The Shia currently celebrate 8 Rabi' al-Thani as his birthday. Hasan was born in Medina, though Donaldson has cast doubt on this, as he is uncertain between Medina and Samarra. His father was the tenth Shia Imam, Ali al-Hadi, and his mother was a freed slave (umm walad), whose name is variously given as Hudayth, Susan, or Salil in different sources. At the age of about two, Hasan was brought to Samarra with his father in 233 or 234 AH (847–849), where the latter was held under close surveillance by the Abbasid caliphs until his death in 254 (868), some twenty years later.

When Hasan was about twenty-two, an agent of his father is said to have providentially bought a Byzantine concubine, named Narjis (Narcissus), who was given to Hasan in marriage, and later bore him his only son. Other sources give her name variously as Sayqal, Sawsan, and Rayhana. The detailed accounts of Mohammad-Baqer Majlesi and Shaykh Tusi describe Narjis as a captured granddaughter of the Byzantine emperor and a pious woman who was told in a dream about her future union with Hasan, though these accounts have been described as hagiographic. Some other accounts describe Narjis as Nubian.

=== During the reign of Abbasids ===
A significant part of al-Askari's life, both during his own imamate and his father's, was spent in a situation where the Abbasid Caliphate had become a tool for rival emirs who played an effective role in the government system. The hostile rivalries between the emirs of the Abbasid system had caused the caliphs to hold the caliphate for short periods, which had severely weakened the foundations of the caliphate.

==== Reign of al-Mustain ====
Perhaps the first recorded political stance in the life of al-Askari dates back to when he was about 20 years old and his father was still alive. In fact, it was in 252 AH, two years before he assumed the Imamate, that al-Askari reportedly wrote a letter, addressed to a Tahirid emir, Abu Ahmad Ubaydullah ibn Abdullah ibn Tahir, (the brother of Tahir ibn Abdallah, the emir of Khorasan), who was an opponent of al-Musta'in, in which he calls the caliph a "tyrant" and asks God to remove him. Shortly after, following a rebellion against Musta'in, he was deposed and al-Mu'tazz succeeded him as caliph. According to Ibn Athir, Abu Ahmad Tahiri himself played an important role in the rebellion against al-Musta'in and his killing.

==== Reigns of al-Mu'tazz (r. 866–869) and al-Muhtadi (r. 869–870) ====
In 252 AH, Musta'in was overthrown and his enemy, Mu'taz, assumed the caliphate. According to Pakatchi, given the animosity between Mu'taz and Musta'in, and the fact that Mu'taz's powerful emirs, such as Abu Ahmad Taheri, had informed the new caliph of al-Askari's hatred for the murdered caliph, Mu'taz would not have shown hostility towards him and his father at the beginning of his reign, at least on the surface. In 254 AH, when al-Hadi died and al-Askari succeeded his father, al-Askari enjoyed relative freedom and lived in his own home, despite the restrictions imposed on his activities.

Less than a year into his imamate, Pakatchi writes, the caliph became suspicious of the Imam. Al-Askari's diligent efforts to maintain and reform the Shia financial system and collect funds, which began at the very beginning of his imamate, and his extensive correspondence with the Shias of various regions, and the influence he had even over some government officials such as Abu Ahmad Taheri, could have caused the caliph to worry.

In the second year of Askari's imamate and the last year of Mu'taz's caliphate, i.e. 255 AH, al-Askari was imprisoned by al-Mu'tazz in Baghdad, and he was kept in prison through the short reign of al-Muhtadi, the next caliph.

During the reign of Mu'taz and before his death, some plots to assassinate Askari apparently failed. Shortly after, Mu'taz died, and the short period of Muhtadi's caliphate was marked by conflict between the rulers. Although Muhtadi had Mu'tazilite leanings, this did not prevent the caliph from persecuting Askari, since Salih ibn Wasif, who was the most powerful emir in the court of the previous caliph, still had so much authority that the caliph could not oppose his decisions.

In the last period of the Caliphate of al-Muhtadi, the Caliph adopted a strict policy towards the Shias, intending to drive them away from the important centers of Iraq; the pressure on the Shia prisoners also increased, and it was at this time that a certain emir named Nasr ibn Ahmad al-Zubairi agreed to carry out the Caliph's intention to kill al-Askari, but this decision coincided with the collapse of al-Muhtadi government. Nasr ibn Ahmad al-Zubairi was forced to go to war, according to al-Tabari, in which he was killed on the first of Rajab 256 AH. This event was considered by al-Askari as a sign of God's power. Al-Muhtadi himself was deposed from the Caliphate on the 29th of Rajab following a widespread rebellion, and his death occurred shortly thereafter.

==== Reign of al-Mu'tamid (r. 870–892) ====
The persecution of the Shia continued under al-Mu'tamid, a son of al-Mutawakkil. It is believed that most of al-Askari's prison experiences happened during the caliphate of al-Mu'tamid, who is represented in Shia sources as his main oppressor. Al-Mu'tamid ruled for thirteen years (256–279 AH), but only four years of this reign coincided with the life of al-Askari. The reign of al-Muttamid coincided with the revolts of the Alawites and individuals associated with them. Sahib al-Zanj, claiming Alawi descent, was the most important threat to al-Muttamid's rule. Zanj's violent and reckless actions were worrying even for the Imamiyyah leadership. Al-Askari clearly declared that "Sahib al-Zanj is not from us, the Ahl al-Bayt". The purpose of this stance, according to Pakatchi, was, on the one hand, to prevent the general public from attributing the misconduct of Sahib al-Zanj to the Imamiyya and the Ahl al-Bayt, and another purpose was to prevent the Abbasid government from increasing its strictness against the Shiites, relying on the uprising of Sahib al-Zanj.

However, in 260, al-Mu'tamid, who had freed Askari at the beginning of his reign, ordered Askari and his brother Ja'far to be arrested and taken to prison. Although after a month the caliph was forced to release them, probably for the sake of state interests, but he did not allow him to return to his home in Samarra, instead sent him to "Dar al-Hasan ibn Sahl" to keep a close eye on him. Shortly afterwards, news of his death was circulated.

Al-Askari is said to have criticized the caliph for restricting the administration of Khums (lit. 'one-fifth'), the Islamic alms distributed among the descendants of the prophet, who were forbidden from receiving general alms in the prophet's lifetime. In his lifetime, a main source of assistance for the poor in his clan, the Banu Hashim, was the income of agricultural lands in Fadak. Historically, Abu Bakr, the first Rashidun caliph, discontinued the prophet's policies and, in particular, reappropriated Fadak as public property, forcing Banu Hashim to rely on general alms, possibly to undermine their claims to the caliphate and cut their privileges as the prophet's kins. This policy was partially reversed by his successor, Umar, and then by the Umayyad Umar II, though later caliphs again appended Fadak to the state treasury.

== Death ==
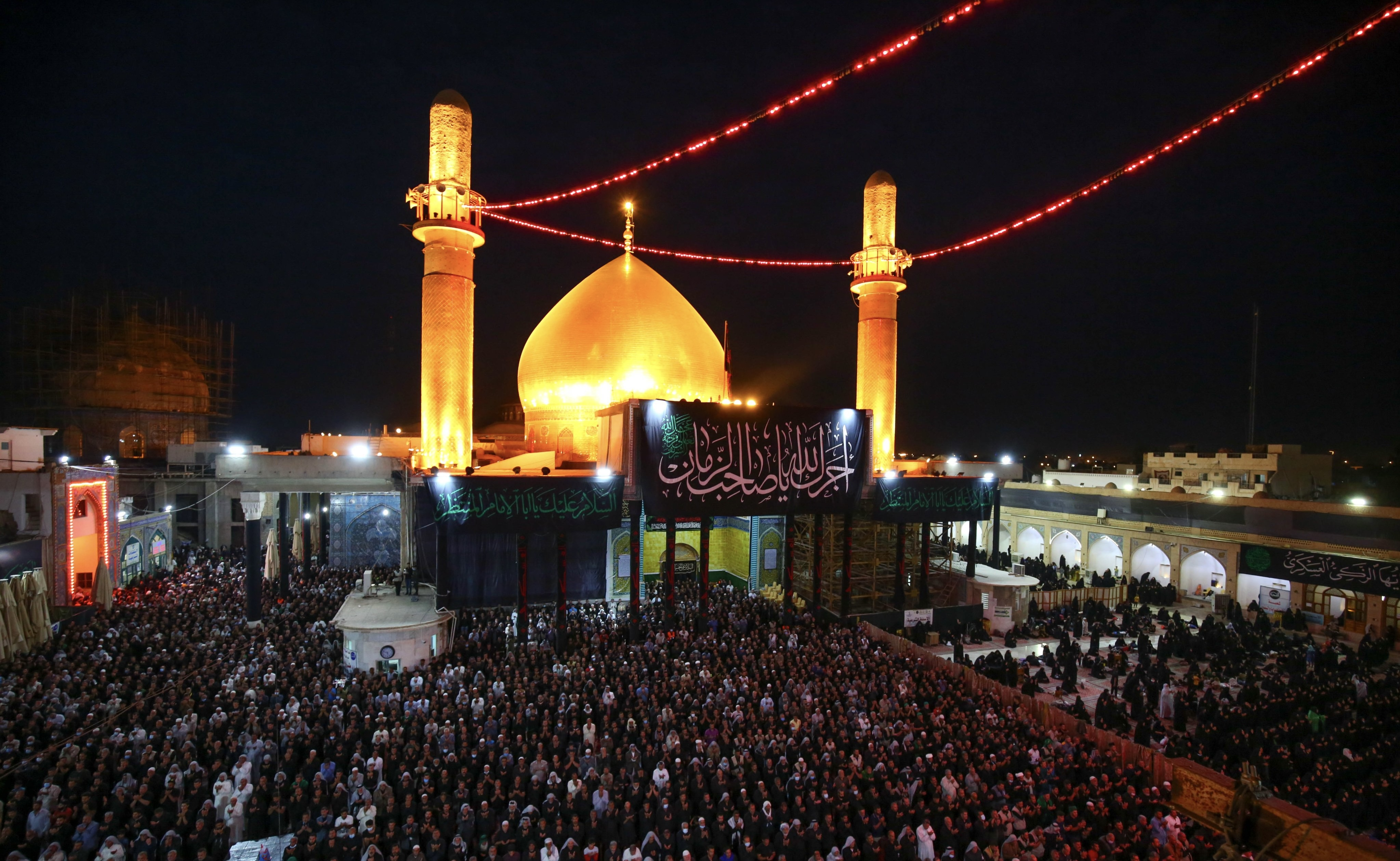
The Al-Askari Shrine in Samarra, Iraq, where Ali al-Hadi and Hasan al-Askari, the tenth and eleventh Imams, are buried. It is a holy site in Shia Islam.

At the age of about twenty-eight, al-Askari died on 1 or 8 Rabi' al-Awwal 260 AH (25 December 873 or 1 January 874) after a week-long illness. The Shia currently commemorate 8 Rabi' al-Awwal for this occasion. Shia sources commonly attribute his death to poisoning at the instigation of al-Mu'tamid. During the week of his illness, many notable Alid and Abbasid figures visited him on his deathbed and the caliph also sent his doctors and servants to attend the Imam. However, considering that al-Askari did not have an obvious heir, Tabatabai maintains that the caliph intended to closely monitor the Imam and later continued to search for his offspring after his death. Hussain, Mohammad Ali Amir-Moezzi, and Abdulaziz Sachedina present similar accounts.

Al-Askari was buried in the family home, next to his father, Ali al-Hadi. The house was later expanded to a major shrine by various Shia and Sunni patrons. More recently, Naser al-Din Shah Qajar ordered to rebuild the complex in 1868–1869 and the golden dome was added in 1905. The shrine also houses the tomb of his aunt, Hakima Khatun. As an important destination for Shia pilgrimage, the shrine was bombed in February 2006 and badly damaged. Another attack was executed on 13 June 2007, which led to the destruction of the two minarets of the shrine. Authorities in Iraq hold al-Qaeda responsible for this attack.

== Imamate ==
Hasan al-Askari calligraphy at the Prophet's Mosque in Medina.

=== Designation as the Imam ===
After the death of al-Hadi in 868, the majority of his followers acknowledged his son, Hasan al-Askari, as their next Imam. Shia sources report that al-Hadi designated Hasan as the next Imam a few months before his death. After al-Hadi, his another son, Ja'far, unsuccessfully claimed the imamate for himself. Madelung adds that some had expected another son of al-Hadi, Muhammad ibn Ali al-Hadi, to be the next Imam but he predeceased his father in Samarra.

=== Network of representatives ===
The imamate of al-Askari began in 868 and lasted only about six years, overlapping with the caliphates of the Abbasid al-Mu'tazz, al-Muhtadi, and al-Mu'tamid. During these years, though not politically active, al-Askari mostly lived under house arrest in Samarra, subject to constant surveillance. Tabatabai and Sachedina write that al-Askari was not allowed any social contact with the general Shia population. Tabatabai also suggests that these restrictions were placed on al-Askari because the caliphate had come to know about the traditions, circulating among the Shia elite, which predicted that the eleventh Imam would father the eschatological Mahdi.

Al-Askari therefore communicated with his followers mostly through a network of representatives, notably Uthman ibn Sa'id al-Asadi.

The representatives were responsible for administering Shia affairs and collecting religious funds, although agents such as Ibrahim ibn Hilal Abartai had deviated from the Imam's command, and for this reason, al-Askari had written a letter, disowning him, and cursing him.

The use of these representatives was a step towards establishing the tradition of the abwāb (gates), according to Pakatchi. Other than Uthman ibn Saeed, Aqid, a special servant of the Imam that raised him from childhood, was the bearer of many of his letters to the Shias. And a person with the nickname Gharib Abu al-Adian, who was also the Imam's servant, was responsible for sending some letters. A group that was the forerunner of the Nusayriyyah has introduced Muhammad ibn Nusayr as his Bab.

Upon entering the period of the Minor Occultation, Uthman ibn Saeed, played the role of the first representative, and special deputy of the twelve Imam, Muhammad al-Mahdi.

=== Ghulat ===
Small groups of ghulat (lit. 'exaggerators'), mostly formed earlier, continued their activities in the lifetime of al-Askari. They often conferred divinity and ascribed supernatural abilities to the Shia Imams and included the Numayriyya, forefathers of present-day Alawites, who followed Mohammad ibn Nusayr al-Numayri in Kufa, and became popular in the late 10th century in Aleppo, Sinjar and Anah; and the Isḥaqiyya, the adherents of Isḥāq ibn Moḥammad al-Nakha'i al-Baṣri in Basra, Baghdad, and Al-Mada'in.

=== Succession ===
As the eleventh Shia Imam, al-Askari died in 873-874 without leaving an obvious heir, which created widespread confusion (hayra) and fragmented the Shia community into up to twenty sects. All these sects, however, disappeared within a hundred years except the Twelver Shia. Some of them held that the imamate ceased with al-Askari and the Waqifiyya maintained that he would later emerge as the eschatological Mahdi. Others concluded that Muhammad ibn Ali al-Hadi, a deceased brother of al-Askari, must have been the true Imam. Yet others accepted the imamate of Ja'far ibn Ali al-Hadi, another brother of al-Askari, who had earlier unsuccessfully claimed the imamate for himself after the death of their father, al-Hadi. Some believed that the twelfth Imam would be born in the end of times to a descendant of al-Askari.

=== Occultation ===
The group that went on to become the Twelvers largely held that al-Askari had a son, named Abu al-Qasim Muhammad, same name as the prophet. Born around 255 (868), he is also known as Muhammad al-Mahdi (lit. 'the rightly guided'). Out of the fear of Abbasid persecution, Muhammad was kept hidden from the public and his existence was only known to a few trusted associates of the eleventh Imam. After the death of his father, Muhammad is said to have made his only public appearance to lead the funeral prayers for his father instead of his uncle, Ja'far. He was not seen publicly afterwards and entered a state of occultation for the fear of persecution. This is said to have happened in the family home in Samarra, where currently a mosque stands, under which there is a cellar (sardab) that hides a well (Bi'r al-Ghayba, lit. 'well of the occultation'), into which al-Mahdi is said to have disappeared.

Immediately after the death of al-Askari, his main representative (wakil), Uthman ibn Sa'id al-Asadi, claimed to be the Bab (lit. 'gate') to the hidden al-Mahdi. This was likely not a radical change for the Shia. Indeed, the tenth and eleventh Imams were also effectively in occultation for the majority of the Shia, as both Imams were held nearly isolated and under close surveillance by the Abbasid caliphs in Samarra. Uthman received petitions and made available their responses, sometimes in writing. According to Daftary, these responses were in Uthman's handwriting, whereas Hussain holds that the handwriting and style did not change even after Uthman's death, suggesting that the responses were written by al-Mahdi. This consistency, according to Hussain, partially explains the consensus of his followers on when the Major Occultation began.

Uthman later introduced his son, Abu Jafar Muhammad ibn Uthman, as the next representative of al-Mahdi. In turn, he nominated Abu al-Qasim al-Husayn ibn Ruh al-Nawbakhti as the next representative. After about seventy years, this period of Minor Occultation (al-ghaybat al-sughra) ended with the death of the fourth representative, Abu al-Hasan Ali ibn Muhammad al-Samarri, who is said to have received a letter from al-Mahdi in 329 (941). The letter predicted the death of Abu al-Hasan in six days and announced the beginning of the Major Occultation (al-ghaybat al-kubra) which, the letter stated, would continue until God grants permission to al-Mahdi to manifest himself again in a time when the earth would be filled with tyranny. It has been noted that the number of these agents was not limited to four in early Shia sources, and Momen suggests that the former network of the representatives (wukala) likely continued to operate during the Lesser Occultation.

=== Twelver doctrine of occultation ===
The Twelver doctrine of occultation (ghayba) crystallized in the first half of the fourth (tenth) century. In its simplest form, this doctrine states that Muhammad al-Mahdi, the twelfth Imam, did not die but has been concealed by God from the mankind and his life has been miraculously prolonged until the day he manifests himself again by God's permission to fill the earth with justice. This occultation continues until the life of Imam is not threatened by enemies, and until the humankind is ready to receive his guidance. During the Minor Occultation, he remained in contact with his followers through the four Babs (gates). During the Major Occultation, which started in 329 (941) and continues to this day, there is no direct communication, though the Imam still remains responsible in Shia belief for the spiritual guidance of humankind, as the sun behind a cloud still gives light and warmth. It also is believed that al-Mahdi occasionally appears to the pious in person or more commonly in dreams and visions. The accounts of these encounters are popular among the Shia. The Shia literature about the doctrine of occultation is extensive, based both on rational and textual arguments. One such instance is a famous hadith attributed to the prophet by both Shia and Sunni authorities. This hadith states that "If the earth had only one day of existence left to it, God would prolong that day until a man of my posterity, whose name will be my name, and his surname my surname, manifests himself; he will fill the earth, filled till then with violence and oppression, with harmony and justice."

== Contributions ==
=== Contributions to Quranic exegesis ===
Interpretation of Quranic verses is one of the areas that has been the focus of Hassan Askari's efforts. Tafsir "In the name of Allah, the Most Gracious, the Most Merciful" (Ibn Sha'ba, 487; Masoudi, 264), Tafsir "Thee we worship and Thee we ask for help." (Al-Fatiha / 1 / 5; See: Waram, 2 / 95), Tafsir "And [mention] when your Lord took from the children of Adam..." (Al-A'raf / 7 / 172; see: Masoudi, 264), the interpretation of "Allah eliminates what He wills or confirms, and with Him is the Mother of the Book." (Ar-Ra'd/ 13 /39; see: ibid.; also Tusi, al-Ghaiba, 430–431; Rawandi, al-Kharaij, 2 / 688; Ibn Hamzah, 567), the interpretation of "O my father, why do you worship ..." (Maryam / 19 / 42; See: Qumi, 2/51) and the interpretation of "To Allah belongs the command before and after" (Ar-Rum/ 30 / 4; see: Ibn Shahr Ashub, 3 / 535) are among them.

In addition to these, a well-known early Shia commentary of the Quran is attributed to al-Askari, which is believed to be authentic by some Shia authorities, notably, Al-Shaykh Al-Mufid.

Even if the attribution is not correct, Pakatchi believes that al-Askari's fame for interpretative discussions has provided the basis for this attribution. Meanwhile, some critics have doubted the attribution of the entire text to al-Askari, and have accepted the principle that some of the contents of the book may have come from the Imam.

=== Contributions to theology ===
==== Aql and Jahl ====
The issue of the opposition between reason (Aql) and ignorance (Jahl) and their armies, which was previously raised by Ja'far al-Sadiq and Musa al-Kazim, has found a new dimension in the teachings of al-Askari. According to al-Askari, it is the wise person who is the addressee of divine commands and words, and God has not made anyone but the wise person His addressee. Just as the beauty of the face causes external beauty, the beauty of the intellect also causes internal beauty. Ignorance is the enemy of man and always increases the suffering of the ignorant. In the teachings of al-Askari, ignorance is not something that can be removed by education and training, and the effort to educate the ignorant is like a miracle. With this understanding of the concept of reason, there is a clear contradiction between the possession of wisdom and the pursuit of the world, and it is on this basis that al-Askari says in a phrase: "If the people of the world were wise, the world [would be ignored and] destroyed."

==== Ilm and Ibadah ====
Al-Askari considered the purpose of human creation to be two things: knowledge (Ilm (Arabic)) and worship (Ibadah). Regarding the relationship between Ilm and Ibadah, al-Askari does not consider worship to be a lot of fasting and prayer but rather considers the indicator of worship to be a lot of thinking about divine matters.

Like the relationship between thinking and worship, in the words of al-Askari, any kind of fulfillment of the right to God is not achievable except through knowledge and understanding; for example, in a saying of al-Askari, it is stated that "no one recognizes a blessing except the one who is grateful, and no one is grateful for a blessing except the one who has knowledge". Recognizing all blessings is something that is considered among the characteristics of the Ahl al-Bayt in the words of al-Askari, and the Imam has also called the believers to knowledge and insight into divine blessings. With the condition of knowledge, according to al-Askari, there is no blessing, no matter how great, that the grateful person cannot express gratitude for.

Other than reason as a path to knowledge, one of the most important ways to knowledge is the verses of the Quran and the Prophetic hadiths, in the words of al-Askari. According to Pakatchi, many of the contents of al-Askari's words are a literal translation of Quranic contents.

=== Contributions to jurisprudence ===
According to Shia scholars of hadith, one of the epithets by which al-Askari is referred to in hadiths is the title of Faqīh (Islamic jurist or expert in fiqh) which shows that during the life, he was specifically known by his companions with this title.

In the Hadiths of al-Askari, attention has been paid to the reasons for some divine rulings, including the reason for the creation of man, the reason for naming Fatima, Zahra, the causal relationship between a child's disobedience to parents in childhood and disowned by parents in adulthood, the causal relationship between committing a sin and suffering poverty, and the causal relationship between lying and other sins. On this basis, when it came to jurisprudential issues, the evolutionary and not legislative reasons for the rulings were sought; such as that God made fasting obligatory so that the rich could taste hunger and show kindness to the needy, or that God made obligatory the prayers not because of need but as a mercy to His servants, to separate the impure from the pure, to test the breasts and purify the hearts, and to create competition in attaining divine mercy and competing to occupy higher positions in Paradise.

=== Contribution to ethics ===
==== Fear and hope ====
One of the characteristics of the moral school of the Ahl al-Bayt was generally a tendency to balance fear and hope. For example, in a hadith from al-Askari, emphasis has been placed on having good suspicion of God and in relation to fear, in another hadith, belittling sin has been severely criticized: "Among the sins that are not forgivable is that a person thinks about a sin and wishes that he were not held accountable except for it".

Regarding the function of fear and hope, al-askari has said: "I do not know what the meaning of a man's fear and hope is until these two do not prevent him from committing the lusts presented to him and do not give him patience to face the calamity that has befallen him".

==== Piety ====
While recommending piety, al-Askari also explained the misunderstandings related to it and what piety is, such as the saying that the most pious of people is the one who stops when faced with misgiving (doubt).

Along with piety, other terms such as asceticism (Zuhd) and servitude (Ta'abbud) were also mentioned in al-Askari's words, brief definitions of each of them are given; for example, it is stated that the most pious of people is the one who abandons the forbidden; and the most devout person is the one who fulfills his obligations. In al-Askari's hadiths, Sufism is also discussed on occasions, and in a mild and at the same time critical tone, a "fake Sufi" is condemned.

In line with the definition that asceticism had in al-Askari's moral teachings, some sins, foremost of which is lying, are forbidden in his hadiths as the mother of corruption; Sins such as lying and betrayal both disrupt social relations and cause a person's moral decline. Regarding lying, it is stated in a quote from al-Askari that God has placed all evils in a house, and has placed the key to that house in lies. That is why al-Askari, in the general instructions he presents for moral reform, has combined piety in religion and truthfulness in speech. Another sin that al-Askari has strictly prohibited is betrayal of trust, and it is clear from al-Askari's teaching that it does not matter to what extent the giver of the trust is approved by the receiver in terms of religion or character, the principle is that the trust must be returned to the one who is entrusted (An-Nisa 4:58) and no betrayal of trust is acceptable. In his famous will addressed to the Shias, al-Askari instructed them to "fulfill the trust of anyone they have entrusted to them, whether they are good or evil". In the continuation of this will, he equated trustworthiness with piety and truthfulness as principles governing the moral conduct of believers.

==== Tawakkul ====
To determine a general framework for the moral teachings of al-Askari, Pakatchi considers this framework to be a combination of two policies: To the extent that is beyond the scope of human management, the proposed policy is Tawakkul ("to put trust" or "to rely"), and to the extent that can be managed by humans, the proposed policy is moderation. In a quotation inspired by the Quran, al-Askari says that Whoever receives good, God has given him and whoever is kept away from evil, God has protected him.

He also says: "There is no calamity except that God has a blessing in it that encompasses that calamity". And man has an active role in al-Askari's doctrine of Tawakkul. In a saying of al-Askari, it is stated: "No one who is dear abandons the truth except that he is humiliated, and no humiliation is committed to the truth except that he is made dear".

In various sayings of al-Askari, it is emphasized that no greedy person will achieve what is not destined for him; When what is destined is certain to happen, then why should there be humiliation and lamentation? in the same time al-Askari emphasizes that a person's guaranteed sustenance from God should not prevent him from fulfilling his obligations.

==== Moderation ====
As far as the sphere of human management of one's character and behavior is concerned, the call for moderation is seen in the teachings of al-Askari. Even in worship, while the Imam has advised his Shiites to worship a lot and prostrate for a long time, he forbids excess and reminds them that the limit of commitment is to perform the obligatory duties. In this regard, obsession in religious matters has been criticized, and in a speech, the Imam has considered the one who transgresses in his purity as someone who has violated his purity. Moderation is also recommended in social relations, and, among other things, he has been advised to refrain from excessive joking and laughing. In a response to Muhammad ibn Hamza al-Suri, the Imam called upon him to be moderate in his livelihood and avoid extravagance, and reminded him that extravagance is the work of Satan.

However, the culmination of discussions on moderation is seen in a famous hadith of the Imam in which he considered a set of morally commendable qualities in the context of moderation; a hadith that says: "Modesty has a limit, and if it exceeds it, it is weakness; generosity has a limit, and if it exceeds it, it is extravagance; caution has a limit, and if it exceeds it, it is cowardice; thrift has a limit, and if it exceeds it, it is stinginess; and courage has a limit, and if it exceeds it, it is recklessness."

==== Sociability and good manners ====
Humility in Askari's words is known as the secret of ethical conduct in dealing with people and is introduced as a blessing that no one will ever envy.

In Askari's words, greeting anyone who passes by and sitting in a gathering without paying attention to the honor of one's position are examples of humility. Also, seeking superiority and leadership over others are considered factors that lead to destruction. Also in al-Askari's words, anger is the key to all evil; resentment deprives one of comfort, and the least comfortable people are those who harbor resentment; the worst person is the hypocrite and backbiter who envies another if he receives a blessing and despises him if a calamity befalls him. What breaks a person's back is a neighbor who, if he sees a good deed, hides it and if he sees a sin, exposes it; And he who does not fear people's honor is far from fearing God.

Likewise, patience is part of wisdom, and he whose patience does not allow him to swallow the drops of anger does not know peace of heart; the best of brothers is the one who forgets his brother's mistakes; and good behavior and good character towards people are among the signs of a true believer.

In the teachings of the Imam, seclusion and isolation are not recommended, and the Shias are even called to extensive interaction with those who oppose them in religion; in a speech, the Imam, while referring to the tradition left by the previous Imams, advises the Shias to pray with them, attend their funerals, visit their sick, and fulfill their rights. In another hadith, the Imam advised the Shias to be good neighbors and to take care of their neighbors' affairs – regardless of their religion.

One should not honor and favor a person with a means or behavior that causes him hardship; it is far from politeness for a person to express happiness in front of someone who is sad; the most deserving of love is the one who has been bored by others; silence is commendable in many situations, the heart of a fool is in his mouth and the mouth of a wise man is in his heart.

It is also from al-Askari who says: "It is enough for a person to discipline himself that he avoids whatever he dislikes in others."

=== Else ===
In the context of Shia responsibilities in the absence of Imams, a hadith ascribed to al-Askari is given by Mavani. The hadith states that "It is obligatory for the populace to follow the jurist who refrains from committing wrong, mentions his faith, opposes carnal desire, and obeys Allah’s command".

Haider quotes a hadith, attributed to al-Askari, about the specific characteristics that distinguish a Shia from the wider mass of Muslims: "There are five signs of a believer – fifty-one cycles of prayer [every day], the pilgrimage to Husayn's tomb forty days after the anniversary of his death, the wearing of a ring on the right hand, the placing of the forehead on the earth in prostration, and the audible recitation of the basmala (lit. 'in the name of God') [during daily prayers]."

In the context of intercession (shafa'a), al-Askari is reported to have said that only a small fraction of God's mercy (rahma) has been dispersed among His creation in this world. All of God's mercy will be diffused on the Day of Judgement by means of which true Muslims will successfully intercede on behalf of their communities.

== Companions and disciples ==
Among the companions and disciples of al-Askari that Shaykh Tusi and Ahmad ibn Muhammad al-Barqi listed in their Rijali books are the names of Abd al-Azim al-Hasani, Saad ibn Abdullah al-Ash'ari Qummi, Abdullah ibn Ja'far al-Humairi, Muhammad ibn Husayn ibn Abi al-Khattab Kufi, Abu Hashim Dawood ibn Qasim Ja'fari, Muhammad ibn Salih al-Armani, Harun ibn Muslim the scribe, Ahmad ibn Ishaq Ash'ari Qomi, Sahl ibn Ziyad al-Adi, Dawood ibn Amir al-Ash'ari Qummi, Muhammad ibn Isa Yaqtini, Muhammad ibn Ali Tustri, Ahmad ibn Muhammad al-Siyari, Ali ibn Muhammad al-Sayyari, Ismail ibn Ishaq Nishaburi, Ibrahim ibn Abd al-Nishaburi, Abu Ali Ahmad ibn Hammad Mahmudi, Ibrahim ibn Muhammad ibn Faris Nishaburi, Ahmad ibn Idris Qummi, and Husayn ibn Ashkib al-Marwazi. Al-Fadl ibn Shadhan, Abu Sahl Isma'il ibn Ali al-Nawbakhti, Uthman ibn Sa'id al-Asadi are also among his companions.

Some of Askari's students had asked him questions on various religious issues, including beliefs and jurisprudence, and had compiled a collection of their questions and answers with the Imam in the form of a book, a copy of which does not exist today, but its information can be searched in early Imami indexes. Among these are the al-Masael and tawqiaat of Abdullah ibn Ja'far al-Humairi (Najashi, 220), the al-Masael (lit. questions) of Abu Tahir Muhammad ibn Sulayman al-Zarari (ibid, 347), al-Masael of Muhammad ibn Ali ibn Isa Qummi (ibid, 371), and al-Masael of Muhammad ibn Hassan Saffar Qummi (Tusi, al-Fihrist, 144).

Also Day and Night (یوم و لیله), a book by Al-Fadl ibn Shadhan, which was a jurisprudential text regarding religious practices day and night, is said to have reached the opinion of Hasan al-Askari and was approved by him.

== See also ==
- List of extinct Shia sects
- Muhammadite Shia

== Bibliography ==
- Halm, H. (1987). "ʿASKARĪ". Encyclopaedia Iranica. Vol. II/7. p. 769.
- Eliash, J. (2022). "Ḥasan Al-ʿAskarī". In Bearman, P. (ed.). Encyclopaedia of Islam (Second ed.). Brill Publishers.
- Daftary, Farhad (2013). A History of Shi'i Islam. I.B. Tauris. ISBN 9780755608669.
- Tabatabai, Sayyid Mohammad Hosayn (1975). Shi'ite Islam. Translated by Seyyed Hossein Nasr. State University of New York Press. ISBN 0-87395-390-8.
- Donaldson, Dwight M. (1933). "The Shi'ite Religion - A History of Islam in Persia and Iraḳ". AMS Press.
- Momen, Moojan (1985). An Introduction to Shi'i Islam. Yale University Press. ISBN 9780300034998.
- Mavani, Hamid (2013). Religious Authority and Political Thought in Twelver Shi'ism - From Ali to Post-Khomeini. Routledge. ISBN 978-0-415-62440-4.
- Bernheimer, Teresa (2022). "ʿAlī L-Hādī". In Fleet, Kate (ed.). Encyclopaedia of Islam (Third ed.). Brill Publishers.
- Glassé, Cyril, ed. (2008). "Hidden Imām". The New Encyclopedia of Islam. Rowman & Littlefield. pp. 178–179. ISBN 9781905299683.
- Madelung, Wilferd (1985). "ʿALĪ AL-HĀDĪ". Encyclopedia Iranica. Archived from the original on 17 November 2015.
- Madelung, Wilferd (1997). The succession to Muhammad - A study of the early caliphate. Cambridge University Press. ISBN 0-521-64696-0.
- Sajjadi, Sadeq (2022). "Fadak". Encyclopaedia Islamica. Brill Publishers.
- Aslan, Reza (2011). No god but God - The origins, evolution, and future of Islam. Random House. ISBN 9780812982442.
- Jafri, S.H.M (1979). "Origins and early development of Shia Islam". Longman.
- Hulmes, Edward D.A. (2013). "HASAN AL-'ASKARI, ABU MUHAMMAD HASAN IBN 'ALI (c. AD 845–874)". In Netton, Ian Richard (ed.). Encyclopedia of Islamic Civilization and Religion. Routledge. p. 217. ISBN 9781135179670.
- Gleave, Robert (2004). "GHAYBA(T)". In Martin, Richard C. (ed.). Encyclopedia of Islam and the Muslim World. Vol. 2. Macmillan Publishers. pp. 273–274. ISBN 0-02-865604-0.
- Corbin, Henry (2014). History of Islamic Philosophy. Translated by Sherrard, Liadain. Routledge. ISBN 9781135198893.
- Haider, Najam (2011). The Origins of the Shi'a - Identity, Ritual, and Sacred Space in Eighth-Century Kufah. Cambridge University Press. ISBN 9781139503310.
- Esposito, John L., ed. (2004). The Oxford Dictionary of Islam. Oxford University Press. ISBN 9780199757268.
- Campo, Juan E. (2009). "tafsir". Encyclopedia of Islam. Facts on File. p. 652. ISBN 978-0-8160-5454-1.
- Amir-Moezzi, Mohammad Ali (2007). "ISLAM IN IRAN VII - THE CONCEPT OF MAHDI IN TWELVER SHI'ISM". Encyclopaedia Iranica. Vol. XIV/2. pp. 136–143.
- Adamec, Ludwig W. (2017). Historical Dictionary of Islam (Third ed.). Rowman & Littlefield. ISBN 9781442277236.
- Hussain, Jassim M. (1986). Occultation of the Twelfth Imam - A Historical Background. Routledge. ISBN 9780710301581.
- Sobhani, Ja'far (2001). "Doctrines of Shi'i Islam" (PDF). Translated by Shah-Kazemi, Reza. I.B. Tauris. ISBN 01860647804.
- Modarressi, Hossein (1993). Crisis and Consolidation in the Formative Period of Shi'ite Islam - Abū Ja'far Ibn Qiba Al-Rāzī and His Contribution to Imāmite Shī'ite Thought (PDF). Darwin Press. ISBN 9780878500956. Archived from the original (PDF) on 16 June 2022.
- Pierce, Matthew (2016). Twelve Infallible Men - The Imams and the Making of Shi'ism. Harvard University Press. ISBN 9780674737075.
- Sachedina, Abdulaziz Abdulhussein (1981). Islamic Messianism - The Idea of Mahdi in Twelver Shi'ism. SUNY Press. ISBN 9780873954426.
- Pakatchi, Ahmad (2019). "Hassan Askari (a), Imam". Center for the Great Islamic Encyclopedia.

Shia Islam titles
Preceded by Ali al-Hadi	11th Imam of Twelver Shia Islam; 868–874	Succeeded by Muhammad al-Mahdi
