= Abd Allah ibn Saba' =

Semi-legendary 7th-century Islamic theologian

- Born: c. 7th-century
- Other names: Ibn Sabāʾ; Ibn al-Sawdāʾ; Ibn Wahb

ʿAbd Allāh ibn Sabāʾ al-Ḥimyarī (Arabic: عبد الله بن سبأ الحميري), sometimes also called Ibn Sabāʾ, Ibn al-Sawdāʾ, or Ibn Wahb, was a 7th-century figure in Islamic history associated with a group of followers called the Sabaʾiyya (سبئية).

According to Sunni and Shia tradition, Abd Allah ibn Saba' was a Yemenite Jew from the Arab Himyar tribe who converted to Islam during Uthman's reign. Because of his exaggerated reverence for Ali, he is traditionally considered as the first of the ghulāt. In accounts collected by Sayf ibn Umar, Ibn Saba' and his followers, the Saba'iyya, are said to be the ones who enticed the Egyptians against Uthman and were responsible for breaking the near-settlement at the Battle of the Camel.

Modern historians differ on the historicity of Ibn Saba'. Some believe that Abd Allah ibn Saba' and Ibn al-Sawdāʾ should be considered as two separate individuals (Hodgson). Some have described him as semi-legendary or legendary (Taha Hussein, Bernard Lewis, Wilferd Madelung, Leone Caetani, and Shia historians). Others such as Israel Friedlander, Sabatino Moscati, and most Sunni historians affirm his existence. His Jewish origin has also been contested. Some modern historians assert that Sayf ibn Umar fabricated the episode about the killing of Uthman to "exonerate the people of Medina from participation in the caliph's murder" and the movement to support Ali as a successor to Muhammad did not exist in the time of Uthman. Anthony affirms the existence of Ibn Saba' as the one who articulated the doctrine of the return of Ali.

== Historicity ==
According to traditional Sunni and Shia sources, Abd Allah ibn Saba' was a Yemenite Jewish convert to Islam. But modern historians differed on the historicity of Ibn Saba. M.G.S. Hodgson doubts that Ibn Saba' was a Jew, and suggests that Ibn Saba' and Ibn al-Sawda' should be considered as two separate individuals. According to Leone Caetani, Ibn Saba in origin was a purely political supporter of Ali, "around whom later generations imagined a religious conspiracy like that of the Abbasids". Taha Hussein and Ali al-Wardi maintain that Ibn Saba' was the creation of Umayyad propaganda.

However, some historians affirm the existence of Ibn Saba' or his followers. Israel Friedlander concludes that Ibn Saba' and the Saba'iyya did, in fact, exist. His work has also been attested to by Sabatino Moscati. Linda D. Lau and A. R. Armush also accept Sayf ibn Umar's accounts and the role of the Saba'iyya at the Battle of the Camel. Anthony affirms his existence, not in the role of an agitator given to him by Sayf, but as the one who famously articulated in Mada'in the doctrine of the return of Ali.

Concerning Ibn Saba's religious beliefs, and particularly those of the Saba'iyya, W. F. Tucker noted that they are more complete and better recorded in sources devoted to heresiography. Matti Musa points out that the Saba'iyya as a ghulat sect did in fact exist, noting that their views have been seriously considered by both Sunni and Shia heresiographers. Hodgson states that there are contradictions in what religious views is ascribed to him and his followers, but we can assume that he was a founder or a hero of one or more sects called Sabaʾiyya, which exalted the position of Ali.

== Ancestry ==
M. G. S. Hodgson concludes he was most likely not a Jew. W. F. Tucker suggests the possibility that the attribution of Jewish ancestry to Ibn Saba' on his paternal side and imputation of black descent on his mother's side, were fabricated to discredit his credentials as a Muslim Arab and "thus stigmatize all ideas associated with him". Bernard Lewis states that modern critical scholarship casts doubt on his Jewishness. Citing the example of Ibn Saba', Lewis states that there is tendency in Islamic sources to attribute subversive and extremist doctrines to Jewish origins, conspiracy or instigation. G. Levi Della Vida also rejects his Jewish origin and maintains that Ibn Saba' was an Arab.

However, according to Hartwig Hirschfeld, Abd Allah ibn Saba' was a Jew from Yemen who embraced Islam. Israel Friedlander suggested that he may have been a son of an Ethiopian Falasha woman, which explains why he was called "ibn al-Sawdāʾ". W. F. Tucker, after examining the different arguments, concludes that "Whatever is the case regarding his ethnic identity, it is quite probable that Ibn Saba' was a Yemenite, and that he came from a Jewish milieu".

== Ghulat ==
Traditionally, Abd Allah ibn Sabaʾ is considered as the first of the ghulāt. He may have been the first to deny that Ali had died and predicted his return (rajʿa), which was considered one form of ghulū. Also, the notion of the absence or 'occultation' (ghayba) of an imam seem to have appeared first among the ghulāt.

Heinz Halm records him as a representative of a Ghulat group from the city of Seleucia-Ctesiphon (al-Madā'in) who came to see ‘Alī in Kūfah. When Ibn Saba' proclaimed divinity, then ‘Alī denied this angrily and exiled him back to Seleucia-Ctesiphon. Heinz Halm adds that Islamic writers such as Ašʿari in Maqālāt, Baḡdādi in Feraq have said that Ibn Saba' was the first person who idolized Ali ibn Abi Talib. He preached that ʿAli was God (al-elāh). After ʿAli's death, he is said to maintain this idea that "a devil in ʿAli's appearance had been murdered" and ʿAli had ascended to heaven and that his return (rajʿa) was imminent.

== Examining his roles in Uthman's killing ==
According to M. G. S. Hodgson, "surer sources" than Tabari and Sayf ibn Umar seem to exclude Ibn Sabaʾ from playing any major role in the political events that led to Uthman's killing.

Wilferd Madelung after reviewing the accounts of Sayf ibn Umar on the alleged role of Abd Allah ibn Saba' in the rebellion against Uthman and emergence of Shi'a asserts "few if any modern historians would accept Sayf's legend of Ibn Saba’".

Taha Hussein asserts that the "fabrication" of ibn Saba' was done by the enemies of the Shias; that the insertion of a "Jewish element" would discredit the Shias. He noted that the absence of any record of ibn Saba' being present at the Battle of Siffin suggests that ibn Saba' is a fictitious person.

Israel Friedlander, Julius Wellhausen, and most particularly, Leone Caetani, assert that Sayf fabricated the episode about killing of Uthman to "exonerate the people of Medina from participation in the caliph's murder" and as Friedlander adds finding a "scapegoat for the troubles surrounding Uthman" and any complicity in the strife resulting in the death of third caliph. Tucker asserts that although it may have been the case, there is no concrete evidence supporting this theory. They note that sources older than al-Tabari are silent on Ibn Saba' and his role in the agitation against Uthman. "They aver that the movement for supporting Ali as heir and testamentary trustee of the prophet did not exist in the time of Uthman as Ibn Saba' had alleged. Therefore, they refuse to accept the authenticity of Ibn Saba's claim that Ali was the heir of prophet". Caetani noted that a religious conspiracy may have been created around the person of Ibn Sabaʾ even though he may have been just a political supporter of Ali.

However, W. F. Tucker notes that the suggestion that Sayf is not reliable is no longer sustainable. Tucker and Landau-Tasseron point out that although Sayf may have been an unscrupulous hadith collector, this should not detract from his general reliability as a transmitter of historical information (akhbārī). Tucker also states that even if Sayf's accounts of Ibn Saba' was a fabrication, he appears to be only the transmitter of the story and not the ultimate source. He adds that accusations of bias could equally be leveled at other akhbārīs contemporary to Sayf, including the Shi'a historian Abu Mikhnaf. Moreover, Fuat Sezgin, Albrecht Noth, and Martin Hinds have also challenged Wellhausen's views and placed Sayf on an equal footing with other traditionalists.

Linda D. Lau and A. R. Armush accept Sayf's accounts and the role of the Saba'iyya at the Battle of the Camel. They point out that traditionalists other than Sayf did not give an explanation to why the hostilities broke out after the near-settlement. Not only Sayf's account is the sole exiting account with an explanation of what happened, it is also logically consistent.

== Sunni views ==
According to Tabari, based on traditions collected by Sayf ibn Umar, Ibn Saba' was a Yemenite Jew who embraced Islam. During the time of Ali ibn Abi Taleb, he introduced a number of concepts that later were ascribed to more extreme factions of Shia Islam, or ghulat. According to these traditions, the exaltation of Ali, his divine appointment by the Islamic prophet Muhammad as a successor, the concept of occultation (ghayba) and return (rajʿa) were first formulated and expressed by Ibn Sabaʾ and his followers (the Sabaʾiyya). He and his followers are sometimes said to be the ones who enticed the Egyptians against Uthman on the ground of Ali's special right of succession, and participated in further instigation at later conflicts. Historically, Sunni theologians have not only upheld Ibn Saba's existence, but used evidence from the historical works of the Shi'a in order to support their claims.

In Sunni polemics, Ibn Saba' plays the same role of seeking to destroy the message of Islam from within (by introducing proto-Shi'ite beliefs) as Paul would play in seeking to deliberately corrupt the early teachings of Jesus.

== Shia views ==
In traditional Shia sources, Abd Allah ibn Saba' is viewed as an extremist (Ghali) that was cursed and killed by Ali ibn Abi Talib (1st Shia Imam), and cursed by Ali ibn Husayn (4th Shia Imam), Muhammad al-Baqir (5th Shia Imam) and Ja'far al-Sadiq (6th Shia Imam). Nevertheless, Ibn Sabaʾ became the subject of a tradition used by different Shia factions to both attack and defend extreme Shia groups. According to these traditions, Ali first exiled him for declaring Ali as God and himself as prophet. But when he did not stop from his incorrect belief, Ali killed him and then burned his corpse.

Shia scholars such as Abu Muhammad al-Hasan bin Musa al-Nawbakhti, Abu Amr bin Abdul Aziz al-Kash-shi, Al-Hasan bin Ali al-Hilly, al-Astra Abadi,Al-Sadooq, and Al-Nawbakhty talked about the stories and narrations of Ibn Saba. Al-Maamiqaaniy has asserted the existence of Abd Allah ibn Saba'.

It is narrated different traditions from Shia Imams in the book Rijal al-Kashshi about the belief of Abd Allah ibn Saba' (i.e. divinity of Ali and prophethood of himself), and also cursing of him by different Shia Imams. One such example includes:

Abu Ja’far, the 5th Shia Imam said:

Abd Allah ibn Saba' used to claim being a prophet and claimed that The commander of believers (i.e. Ali) is God. Allah is Higher than such claim. This news reached to The commander of believers (i.e. Ali), so he called him and questioned him. But he repeated his claims and said:

"You are Him (i.e. God), and it has been revealed to me that you are God and I am a prophet." So the commander of believers (i.e. Ali) said: "How dare you! Satan has made a mockery of you. Repent for what you said. May your mother weep at your death! Quit [your claim]." But he refused, so Ali imprisoned him and asked him three times to repent, but he didn't. Thus he burnt him (i.e. his corpse after killing him ) with fire and said: "Satan had taken him into his whim, he used to come to him and to induce these (thoughts) in him".

— Rijal al-Kashshi, V.1, P.323

After narrating the traditions of Shia Imams which say that Abd Allah ibn Saba' was a cursed person who believed that Ali is God, about him, Rijal al-Kashshi says:

Some knowledgeable people have stated that Abd Allah ibn Saba' was a Jew who had accepted Islam and showed great devotion for Ali (peace be upon him). As a Jew, he used to exaggerate the personality of Joshua, the son of Nun, the Wasi of Moses. After becoming a Muslim, he began to say about the personality of Ali such this(peace be upon him) after the demise of Rasulullah (peace be upon him and his progeny), and he was the first person who manifested the saying of obligation of believing in the Imamate of Ali, and completely dissociated himself from his enemies and he openly opposed them and denounced them as infidels. So, it is in this light that those there were against the Shias said: The origins of Shi'ism and Rafdh are taken from Judaism.

— Rijal al-Kashshi, page.71

Shia scholars have said that "Some knowledgeable people" in the saying of Kashshi refers to those Sunni scholars that wrongly attributed the founding of Shia beliefs to Abd Allah ibn Saba', based on the invented tales of Sayf ibn Umar about whom Sunni eminent scholars like al-Dhahabi, Haakim, Ibn Habban, etc. have said that was a hadith fabricator, liar and also a zindiq (atheist).

Al-Maamqaani from his work Tanqih al-Maqaal Fi Ilm al-Rijaal (2/183-184):

Abd Allah ibn Saba' who returned to kufr (disbelief) and manifested ghuluww (exaggeration)... Exaggerator, cursed one, Amir al-Mu'mineen (i.e., Ali ) burned him with the fire, and he wrongly believed that Ali is God and that himself is a prophet.

From Sa'd ibn Abd Allah al-Ash'ari al-Qummi who was speaking of the Sab'iyyah (in al-Maqaalaat wal-Firaq p. 20):

Al-Sab'iyyah are the associates of Abd Allah ibn Saba' and he is Abd Allah ibn Wahb al-Raasibee al-Hamdaanee, and he was supported in that by Abd Allah ibn Khurasee and Ibn Aswad and they are the loftiest of his companions, and the first of what he manifested was revilement upon Abu Bakr, Umar, Uthman and the Companions and he freed himself from them.

Regarding to this saying of Sa'd bin Abd Allah al-Ash'ari al-Qummi, Shia scholars say that he did not mention any chain of authorities nor did he mention from whom (or which book) he got the story and what his source was. Moreover, al-Ash’ari al-Qummi has narrated many traditions from Sunni authorities. al-Najjashi (d. 450) in his "al-Rijal" said that al-Ash’ari al-Qummi traveled to many places and was well known for his relation with Sunni historians and heard many stories from them. So, he surely wrote this report from what he heard from Sunnis, which was indeed based on the stories of Sayf ibn Umar.

Ni'matullah al-Jazaa'iree, another of Shi'ite famous scholars from his book al-Anwaar al-Nu'maaniyyah (2/234):

Abd Allah ibn Saba' said to Ali (peace be upon him), "You are the Worshipped One in truth." So Ali (peace be upon him) banished him to al-Madaa'in. And it is said that he was a Jew who accepted Islam and whilst upon his Judaism he used to say about Joshua bin Noon and about Moses the likes of what he said about Ali.

The first part of the saying of Ni'matullah al-Jazaa'iree is the Shia belief about Abd Allah ibn Saba' which is based on the authentic traditions. But the second part of his saying ( i.e., And it is said that he was a Jew who accepted Islam ... ) is about the story which was made by Sayf ibn Umar. Usually, in Islamic books, using from the term 'قيل' ( Ghila, i.e., It is said ... ) before mentioning a matter by the author, implies the belief of the author about the weakness of the saying which is mentioned after it. So, using the term 'Ghila' by Ni'matullah al-Jazaa'iree shows that he believed that the saying is weak.

Famous Shia scholar Nau Bakhti writes,

It is known as the Sabai sect because Abd Allah ibn Saba' was its ring leader.

— Khandan-e-Nawbakhti, page 275

Muhammad Ali al-Mual'lim, a present-day Shi'ite, also affirmed the existence of Abd Allah ibn Saba' in his book Abdullah bin Saba: The Unknown Reality. This book was a refutation of those who denied the existence of Abd Allah ibn Saba' giving the excuse of "false narrations".

Modern Shia historians often cite a number of Sunni scholars who considered Sayf ibn Umar as unreliable on matters of prophetic hadith. For example, al-Dhahabi (d. 748 AH) has quoted from the book of Sayf in his History, but wrote in "al-Mughni fi al-Dhu'afa'" that: "Sayf has two books which have been unanimously abandoned by the scholars." They point out to a number of prominent Sunni scholars concur regarding his narration of hadith. including al-Hakim, Abu Dawud, al-Suyuti and al-Nisa'i. However, some modern historians have pointed out that this view of Sayf should be limited to his hadith scholarship, and thus it does not detract from his general reliability as a transmitter of historical information. But this is not acceptable. Because when he used to make many fake traditions, so that logically he used to make fake tales and then narrate them as historical stories.

== Alawism views ==
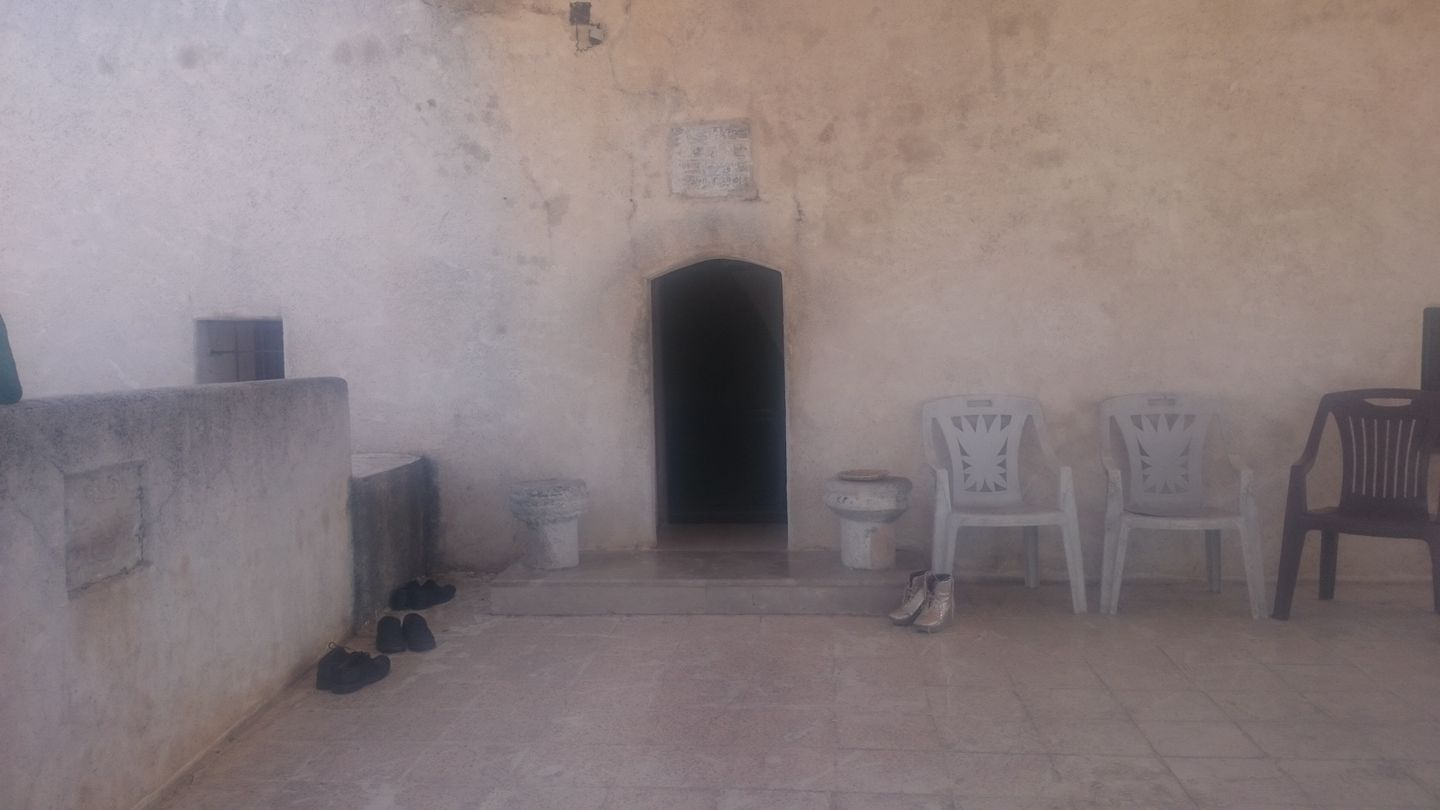
The shrine of Abdullah ibn Saba in the countryside of Qardaha, in the Alawite Mountains

Unlike the Sunnis and the Shi'a, the Alawites hold a distinct view regarding Ibn Saba'; Because he declared the divinity of Ali ibn Abi TalibAl-Khasibi mentions that Abdullah ibn Saba' ascended to heaven

== Other sources ==
There is a favorable Isma'ili legend that formed around the figure of Abd Allah ibn Saba'.

Some early Jewish literature also exists on Ibn Saba. He was largely regarded as an apostate from Judaism.

== See also ==
- History of Shia Islam
- Ka'ab al-Ahbar
- Dhammiyya Shia
