= Arietta Papaconstantinou =

Greek historian and Reader

Arietta Papaconstantinou is Reader in Classics at the University of Reading and Associate Faculty Member in the Faculty of Oriental Studies, University of Oxford. She is an expert in the religious, social and economic history of Egypt and the Near East during the transition from the Roman Empire to the Caliphate.

== Education and career ==
Papaconstantinou was educated at the German School of Athens and Deree College in Athens. She received a Masters in Archaeology and a PhD in Ancient History from the Université de Strasbourg. Her doctoral thesis was entitled Le Culte des saints en Egypte d'après la documentation papyrologique et épigraphique grecque (Ve - VIIe siècle) (1993). Papaconstantinou was Maître de Conférences at the Université Paris I - Panthéon-Sorbonne, where she taught since 1999. She joined Reading University in 2011.

Papaconstantinou was a Summer Fellow at Dumbarton Oaks in 1998. Her project was “The Cult of Saints in Byzantine and Umayyad Egypt: The Contribution of Greek and Coptic Papyrological and Epigraphical Evidence”. She was a Fellow at Dumbarton Oaks, 2006–7. Her research project was 'The Rise and Fall of Coptic: A Cultural History of the Language and its Speakers'. She contributed to the University of Oxford's 'Cult of Saints Project', funded by the European Research Council, and she collaborated on the 'Provinces et empires: l'Égypte islamique dans le monde antique' Project at the Institut français d’archéologie orientale. With David B. Hollander and Andrew Erskine, Papaconstantinou is a General Editor for the Encyclopedia of Ancient History, published by Wiley.

== Select bibliography ==
- Le culte des saints en Égypte des Byzantins aux Abbassides. L’apport des sources papyrologiques et épigraphiques grecques et coptes, Le monde byzantin (Paris 2001)
- The material and the ideal. Essays in medieval art and archaeology in honour of Jean-Michel Spieser, co-ed. with Anthony Cutler, The Medieval Mediterranean 70 (Leiden 2007).
- Becoming Byzantine: children and childhood in Byzantium, co-ed. with Alice-Mary Talbot, Dumbarton Oaks Symposia and Colloquia (Washington 2009).
- ‘Writing true stories’: historians and hagiographers in the late antique and medieval Near East, co-editor with Muriel Debié and Hugh Kennedy, Cultural Encounters in Late Antiquity and the Middle Ages 9 (Turnhout: Brepols 2010).
- The multilingual experience in Egypt from the Ptolemies to the ‘Abbāsids, ed. (Farnham 2010).
- Le Proche-Orient de Justinien aux Abbassides: peuplement et dynamiques spatiales, co-ed. with Antoine Borrut, Muriel Debié, Dominique Pieri and Jean-Pierre Sodini, Bibliothèque d’Antiquité Tardive 19 (Turnhout: Brepols 2011).
