= Umm al-Kitab (Shi'i book) =

Syncretic early Shi'i (ghulāt) work

The Umm al-Kitāb (Arabic: أمّ الکتاب, lit. 'Mother of the Book') is a syncretic Shi'i work originating in the ghulāt milieus of 8th-century Kufa (Iraq). It was later transplanted to Syria by the 10th-century Nusayris, whose final redaction of the work was preserved in a Persian translation produced by the Nizari Isma'ilis of Central Asia. The work only survives in Persian. It contains no notable elements of Isma'ili doctrine, but given the fact that Isma'ili authors starting from the 10th century were influenced by early ghulāt ideas such as those found in the Umm al-Kitāb, and especially given the influence of these ideas on later Tayyibi Isma'ilism, some Isma'ilis do regard the work as one of the most important works in their tradition.

The work presents itself as a revelation of secret knowledge by the Shi'i Imam Muhammad al-Baqir (677–732) to his disciple Jabir ibn Yazid al-Ju'fi (died c. 745–750). Its doctrinal contents correspond to a large degree to what 9th/10th-century heresiographers ascribed to various ghulāt sects, with a particular resemblance to the ideas of the Mukhammisa. It contains a lengthy exposition of the typical ghulāt myth of the pre-existent shadows (Arabic: aẓilla) who created the world by their fall from grace, as is also found in the Kitāb al-Haft wa-l-aẓilla attributed to al-Mufaddal ibn Umar al-Ju'fi (died before 799).

The work must have been multicultural in language, since it includes Arabic, Persian and Aramaic terms. Orthodox and heterodox Jewish, Zoroastrian, Manichaean and Mandaean motifs appear. The tone and style of the work hint that the authors of the work were probably of middle class origin, with some distance to other Muslim groups, like the politically active Shiites and those advocating asceticism.

The treatise offers an esoteric hermeneutics concerning cosmology, the nature of man, and worship within a Qur'anic context.

The book may be an attempt to reconcile dualistic cosmologies, as found among the pre-Islamic Persians, with Islamic monotheism. Several principles of evil, such as the Persian figure Ahriman, are said to be merely a later incarnation of ʿAzāzīl, a fallen angel in Islamic tradition who in turn owes his existence to God.

== See also ==
- Gnosticism
- Manichaeism
- Secret Book of John

== Bibliography ==
=== Tertiary sources ===
- Daftary, Farhad (2015). "Omm al-ketāb". In Yarshater, Ehsan (ed.). Encyclopædia Iranica.
- Halm, Heinz (2001–2012). "Ḡolāt". In Yarshater, Ehsan (ed.). Encyclopædia Iranica.

=== Secondary sources ===
- Anthony, Sean W. (2011). "The Legend of ʿAbdallāh ibn Sabaʾ and the Date of Umm al-Kitāb". Journal of the Royal Asiatic Society. 21 (1): 1–30. JSTOR 23011519.
- Beinhauer-Köhler, Bärbel (2004). "Die Engelsturzmotive des Umm al-Kitāb. Untersuchungen zur Trägerschaft eines synkretistischen Werkes der häretischen Schia". In Auffarth, Christoph; Stuckenbruck, Loren (eds.). The Fall of the Angels. Themes in Biblical Narrative. Vol. 6. Leiden: Brill. pp. 161–175. doi:10.1163/9789047404330_010. ISBN 978-90-04-12668-8.
- De Smet, Daniel (2020). "The Intellectual Interactions of Yemeni Ṭayyibism with the Early Shiʿi Tradition". In Mir-Kasimov, Orkhan (ed.). Intellectual Interactions in the Islamic World: The Ismaili Thread. London: I.B. Tauris. pp. 299–321. ISBN 978-1-83860-485-1.
- Filippani-Ronconi, Pio (1964). "Note sulla soteriologia e sul simbolismo cosmico dell'Ummu'l-kitāb". AION. 14 (1): 111–134.
- Friedman, Yaron (2010). The Nuṣayrī-ʿAlawīs: An Introduction to the Religion, History and Identity of the Leading Minority in Syria. Islamic History and Civilization. Vol. 77. Leiden: Brill. ISBN 978-90-04-17892-2.
- Hämeen-Anttila, Jaakko (2001). "Ascent and Descent in Islamic Myth". In Whiting, Robert M. (ed.). Mythology and Mythologies: Methodological Approaches to Intercultural Influences. Proceedings of the Second Annual Symposium of the Assyrian and Babylonian Intellectual Heritage Project Held in Paris, France, October 4-7, 1999. Helsinki: Neo-Assyrian Text Corpus Project. pp. 47–67. ISBN 9789514590498. OCLC 912739664. (situates the Umm al-kitāb in its Mesopotamian context)
- Ivanow, Wladimir (1932). "Notes sur l'Ummu'l-kitab des Ismaëliens de l'Asie Centrale". Revue des Études Islamiques. 6: 419–481.
- Nasr, S. H.; Aminrazavi, Mehdi (2008). Anthology of Philosophy in Persia: Ismaili Thought in the Classical Age. I.B.Tauris. ISBN 978-0-857-71042-0.
- Radtke, Bernd (1990). "Iranian and Gnostic Elements in Early Taṣawwuf. Observations concerning the Umm al-Kitāb". In Gnoli, Gherardo; Panaino, Antonio (eds.). Proceedings of the first European Conference of Iranian Studies held in Turin, September 7th-11th, 1987 by the Societas Iranologica Europaea. Volume 2: Middle and New Iranian Studies. Rome: Istituto italiano per il Medio ed Estremo Oriente. pp. 519–529. ISBN 9788863230765. OCLC 956121455.

=== Primary sources ===
- Filippani-Ronconi, Pio (1966). Ummu'l-kitab: Introduzione, traduzione e note di Pio Filippani-Ronconi. Napoli: Istituto Universitario Orientale di Napoli. ISBN 978-88-97278-43-6. OCLC 635942972. (Italian translation)
- Halm, Heinz (1981). "Das "Buch der Schatten". Die Mufaḍḍal-Tradition der Ġulāt und die Ursprünge des Nuṣairiertums. II. Die Stoffe". Der Islam. 58 (1): 15–86. doi:10.1515/islm.1981.58.1.15. (German translations of parts of the text on pp. 36 ff.)
- Halm, Heinz (1982). Die islamische Gnosis: Die Schia und die ʿAlawiten. Zürich and München: Artemis Verlag. ISBN 978-3-7608-4530-2. (German translations of parts of the text on pp. 113 ff.)
- Ivanow, Wladimir (1936). "Ummu᾽l-kitāb". Der Islam. 23 (1–2): 1–132. doi:10.1515/islm.1936.23.1-2.1. (edition of the Persian text)
- Tijdens, E. F. (1977). "Der mythologisch-gnostische Hintergrund des Umm al-kitâb". Acta Iranica. VII: 241–526. OCLC 470066089. (partial German translation)
