= Shi'i extremists =

Shi'i extremists may refer to:

- Adherents of modern Islamic extremism in its Shi'i variant
- Ghulāt, early branch of Shi'i Islam (8th/9th century) perceived as holding 'extreme' views about the Imams

== See also ==
- Islamist Shi'ism, political form of Shi'i Islam (not necessarily extremist)
