= Ghulat =

Branch of early Shi'i Islam

The ghulāt (Arabic: غُلَاة, lit. 'exaggerators, extremists') (Note: The singular of the Arabic word is ghālin (غَالٍ), although often the term ghālī is used instead (Anthony 2018; Asatryan 2017, p. 2).) were a branch of early Shi'a Islam. The term mainly refers to a wide variety of extinct Shi'i sects active in 8th- and 9th-century Kufa in Lower Mesopotamia, and who, despite their sometimes significant differences, shared a few common ideas. These common ideas included the attribution of a divine nature to the Imams, metempsychosis (the belief that souls can migrate between different human and non-human bodies), a particular gnostic creation myth involving pre-existent 'shadows' (azilla) whose fall from grace produced the material world, and an emphasis on secrecy and dissociation from outsiders. They were named ghulat by other Shi'i and Sunni Muslims for their purportedly "exaggerated" veneration of Muhammad (c. 570–632) and his family, most notably Ali (c. 600–661) and his descendants, the Imams.

The ideas of the ghulat have at times been compared to those of the late antique gnostics, but the extent of this similarity has also been questioned. Some ghulat ideas, such as the notion of the occultation (ghayba) and return (raj'a) of the Imam, have been influential in the development of Twelver Shi'ism. Later Isma'ili Shi'i authors such as Ja'far ibn Mansur al-Yaman (died c. 957) and Abu Ya'qub al-Sijistani (died after 971) also adapted ghulat ideas to reformulate their own doctrines. The only ghulat sect still in existence today are the Alawites, historically known as Nusayris after their founder Ibn Nusayr (died after 868).

A relatively large number of ghulat writings have survived to this day. Previously, only some works preserved in Isma'ilism were available to scholars such as the Umm al-Kitab (Mother of the Book, 8th–11th centuries), which was published in 1936, the Kitab al-Haft wa-l-azilla (Book of the Seven and the Shadows, 8th–11th centuries) published in 1960, and the Kitab al-Siraṭ (Book of the Path, c. 874–941) published in 1995. However, between 2006 and 2013 numerous ghulat texts that have been preserved in the Alawite tradition were published in the Alawite Heritage Series.

== History ==
=== Origins (680–700) ===
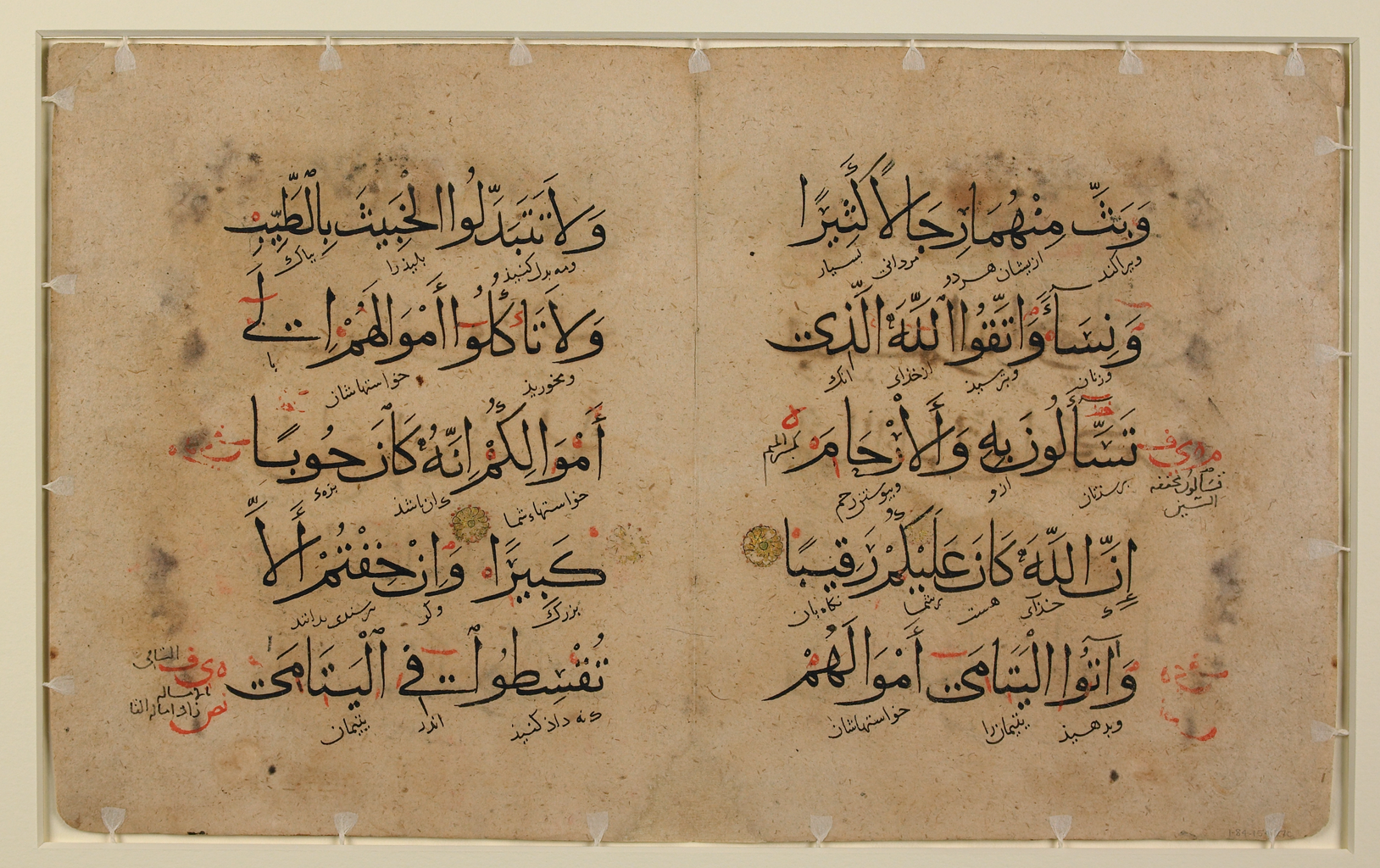
A bilingual fragment of surah al-Nisa, which discusses diviners.

Like Shi'i Islam itself, the origins of the ghulat lie in the pro-Alid movements of the late 7th century that fought against the Umayyad Caliphate (661–750) to bring one of Ali's descendants to power. The earliest use of the term ghulat is found in several reports about the followers of Mukhtar al-Thaqafi, leader of a revolt against the Umayyads on behalf of Ali's son Muhammad ibn al-Hanafiyya, which was part of the Second Fitna, 680–692. According to these reports, some of al-Thaqafi's followers organized regular meetings in the houses of various Kufan women to listen to diviners prophesying about future events.

The followers who attended these meetings were denounced as ghulat by other followers of al-Thaqafi. The Arabic verb ghala 'to exaggerate; to transgress the proper bounds', was in broader use at the time to denounce perceived 'un-Islamic' activities, which may include soothsaying (kahana). But the use of the term here could hardly have been in reference to this, since al-Thaqafi himself often practiced soothsaying, and was respected for this by all of his followers.

Rather, the reason for the use of the term ghulat for this subgroup of al-Thaqafi's followers may be more specifically related to the Quranic use of the word ghala ('exaggerate'). It occurs in the Quran twice, in the surahs an-Nisa (4:171) and al-Ma'idah (5:77), as follows (occurrence of the word ghala underlined):

4:171. O People of the Book! Do not exaggerate in your religion, nor utter anything concerning God save the truth. Verily the Messiah, Jesus son of Mary, was only a messenger of God, and His Word, which He committed to Mary, and a Spirit from Him. So believe in God and His messengers, and say not “Three.” Refrain! It is better for you. God is only one God; Glory be to Him that He should have a child. Unto Him belongs whatsoever is in the heavens and whatsoever is on the earth, and God suffices as a Guardian.

5:72. They certainly disbelieve, those who say, “Truly God is the Messiah, son of Mary.” [...] 73. They certainly disbelieve, those who say, “Truly God is the third of three,” while there is no god save the one God. [...] 5:75. The Messiah, son of Mary, was naught but a messenger—messengers have passed away before him. And his mother was truthful. Both of them ate food. [...] 76. Say, “Do you worship, apart from God, that which has no power to benefit or harm you, when it is God Who is the Hearing, the Knowing?” 77. Say, “O People of the Book! Do not exaggerate in your religion beyond the truth, and follow not the caprices of a people who went astray before, and led many astray, and strayed from the right way.”

The "People of the Book" mentioned here refers to Christians, who are castigated for ascribing a divine status to the prophet Jesus. He was not a "child" of God, but "only a messenger" who like all normal human beings "ate food". The Christian claim that "God is the Messiah, son of Mary" is characterized in 5:72 and other verses as 'disbelief', as is the claim that "God is the third of three", a reference to the Trinity, in which Jesus is believed to be consubstantial with the Godhead. The Quranic concept of 'exaggeration' in both cases refers to 'exaggerating' the status of a prophet as being more-than-human.

It seems probable that the followers of al-Thaqafi who gathered in the Kufan houses were likewise denounced by their colleagues for having exaggerated the status not of Jesus, but of Ali. There had been an earlier movement in Kufa called the Saba'iyya, named after the South Arabian Jewish convert Abd Allah ibn Saba', who according to some reports had insisted that Ali was not dead and would return (raj'a) to seek revenge upon those that opposed him.

Since remnants of the Saba'iyya still existed in the time of al-Thaqafi, and since one of the Kufan women at whose house the group denounced as ghulat gathered belonged to the Saba'iyya, it may well be that this group also belonged to the Saba'iyya. After Mukhtar al-Thaqafi died in 687, his movement sometimes came to be referred to as the Saba'iyya, and when Muhammad ibn al-Hanafiyya, the Alid whom al-Thaqafi's movement had supported, also died in 700, his followers, the Kaysaniyya, claimed that ibn al-Hanafiyya had gone into hiding (ghayba), and that he would return before the Day of Judgment as the Mahdi to establish a state of righteousness and justice.

It appears that in its earliest usage, the term ghulat referred to those Shi'a who taught the dual doctrine of the Occultation (ghayba) and return (raj'a) of the Imam, which other Muslims perceived as an 'exaggerated' view of the Imam's status. Later sources attributed to these earliest ghulat some of the ideas for which the later ghulat would become known, most notably the outright divinization of Ali, but there is no good evidence that this was the case. Rather, the 8th-/9th-century need to attribute these ideas to the earliest ghulat probably arose from the fact that, while groups like the Saba'iyya had traditionally been known as ghulāt, their actual core ideas of occultation and return had become standard tenets of Twelver and Isma'ili Shi'ism, and so other ideas needed to be ascribed to them to justify the ghulat label.

Nevertheless, the later ghulat did probably originate from these early groups, and some glimpses of later ideas may sometimes be found, for example the belief in metempsychosis, which was attributed to early 7th-century ghulat leaders such as the women Hind bint al-Mutakallifa or Layla bint Qumama al-Muzaniyya.

One important difference with the later groups is the prominent role played by women, who organized the early ghulat meetings in their houses and who often acted as teachers, upholding a circle of disciples. This stands in stark contrast to the ideas of the later ghulat, who ranked women between the status of animals and men in their spiritual hierarchy.

=== Uprisings and development of doctrine (700–750) ===
==== Bayan ibn Sam'an al-Tamimi ====
Bayan ibn Sam'an (died 737) was the leader of a ghulat sect called the Bayaniyya.

==== al-Mughira ibn Sa'id ====
Al-Mughira ibn Sa'id (died 737), leader of a ghulat sect called the Mughiriyya, was an adept of the fifth Imam Muhammad al-Baqir (677–732).

==== Abu Mansur al-Ijli ====
Abu Mansur al-Ijli (died c. 738–744) was the leader of a ghulat sect called the Mansuriyya who was killed by the Umayyad governor Yusuf ibn Umar al-Thaqafi.

==== Abd Allah ibn Harb ====
Abd Allah ibn Harb (died 748–9) was the leader of a ghulat sect called the Janahiyya who was killed by the Abbasid activist Abu Muslim al-Khurasani.

=== Political quietism and diffusion of sects (750–) ===
==== Abu al-Khattab ====
Abu al-Khattab al-Asadi (died 755) was the leader of a ghulat sect called the Khattabiyya who was killed by the Abbasid governor Isa ibn Musa. For a time, he was the designated spokesman of the sixth Imam Ja'far al-Sadiq (c. 700–765), but Ja'far repudiated him in c. 748.

==== al-Mufaddal ibn Umar al-Ju'fi ====
Al-Mufaddal ibn Umar al-Ju'fi (died before 799) was a close confidant of Ja'far al-Sadiq and his son Musa al-Kazim (died 799) who for some time was a follower of Abu al-Khattab. Imami heresiographers regarded him as the leader of a ghulat sect called the Mufaddaliyya, but it not certain whether this sect ever existed. A number of important ghulat writings were attributed to him by later authors (see below).

==== Ishaq al-Ahmar al-Nakha'i ====
Ishaq al-Ahmar al-Nakha'i (died 899) was the leader of a ghulat sect called the Ishaqiyya. Some writings were also attributed to him.

==== Ibn Nusayr and al-Khasibi ====
Ibn Nusayr (died after 868) and al-Khasibi (died 969) were the two most important figures in the founding of Nusayrism (called Alawism in the contemporary context), the only ghulat sect that still exists today.

== Ghulāt writings ==
=== Mother of the Book (Umm al-kitab) ===
The Umm al-kitab (Arabic: أمّ الکتاب, lit. 'Mother of the Book') is a syncretic Shi'i work originating in the ghulat milieus of 8th-century Kufa. It was later transplanted to Syria by the 10th-century Nusayris, whose final redaction of the work was preserved in a Persian translation produced by the Nizari Isma'ilis of Central Asia. The work survives only in Persian. It contains no notable elements of Isma'ili doctrine, but given the fact that Isma'ili authors starting from the 10th century were influenced by early ghulat ideas such as those found in the Umm al-kitab, and especially given the influence of these ideas on later Tayyibi Isma'ilism, some Isma'ilis do regard the work as one of the most important works in their tradition.

The work presents itself as a revelation of secret knowledge by the Shi'i Imam Muhammad al-Baqir (677–732) to his disciple Jabir ibn Yazid al-Ju'fi (died c. 745–750). Its doctrinal contents correspond to a large degree to what 9th/10th-century heresiographers ascribed to various ghulat sects, with a particular resemblance to the ideas of the Mukhammisa. (Note: On the Mukhammisa, see Asatryan 2000–2013.) It contains a lengthy exposition of the typical ghulat myth of the pre-existent shadows (Arabic: azilla) who created the world by their fall from grace, as is also found in the Kitab al-Haft wa-l-azilla attributed to al-Mufaddal ibn Umar al-Ju'fi (died before 799).

=== Book of the Seven and the Shadows (Kitab al-Haft wa-l-azilla) ===
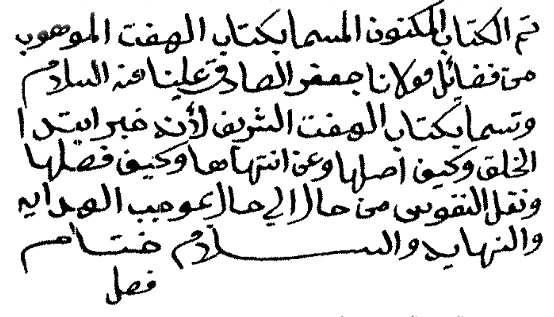
The last paragraph of the Kitab al-Haft wa-l-azilla, from a manuscript of unknown provenance: "Thus is finished the concealed book called the Book of the Seven, which was a gift of grace from our master Ja'far al-Sadiq, peace be upon us from him. It is called the Noble Book of the Seven because it reports about the beginning of creation and its origin, about its ending and conclusion, and about the translocation of souls from state to state in accordance with divine guidance and limitation. Peace, the end."

The Kitab al-Haft wa-l-azilla (Book of the Seven and the Shadows), also known as Kitab al-Haft al-Sharif (Book of the Noble Seven/Noble Book of the Seven) or simply as Kitab al-Haft (Book of the Seven), (Note: Edition of the Arabic text in Tāmir & Khalifé 1960, Ghālib 1964, and Tāmir 2007; critical edition of chapter 59 in Asatryan 2020a, pp. 296–298; discussion of the various editions in Asatryan 2017, pp. 18–19. On this text, see also Halm 1978b; Halm 1981 (continuation of Halm 1978); Capezzone 1999; Asatryan 2017, 13–42 et passim. According to Madelung 1963, p. 181, followed by Halm 1978b, p. 220 and Asatryan 2012, p. 145, the word haft is a Persian loanword meaning 'seven' (Madelung refers to the use of al-haft and al-haftiyya to designate sevenfold things like the seven Adams or the seven heavens, in Tāmir & Khalifé 1960, pp. 125, 128, 130; cf. Ghālib 1964, pp. 163, 167, 171; Tāmir 2007, pp. 173, 176, 179).) written in the 8th–11th century, is an important ghulat text that was falsely attributed to al-Mufaddal ibn Umar al-Ju'fi (died before 799).

It sets out in great detail the ghulat myth of pre-existent 'shadows' (azilla) who created the world by their fall from grace, and who were imprisoned in material human bodies as punishment for their hubris. This theme of pre-existent shadows, (Note: On this theme in general, see also Capezzone 2017.) which also appears in other important ghulat works such as the Umm al-kitab, seems to have been typical of the early Kufan ghulat.

Great emphasis is placed upon the need to keep the knowledge received from Ja'far al-Sadiq, who is referred to in the work as mawlana 'our master', from falling into the wrong hands. This secret knowledge is entrusted by Ja'far to al-Mufaddal but is reserved only for true believers (mu'minun).

It involves such notions as the transmigration of souls (tanasukh or metempsychosis) and the idea that seven Adams exist in the seven heavens, each one of them presiding over one of the seven historical world cycles (adwar). This latter idea may reflect an influence from Isma'ilism, where the appearance of each new prophet (Adam, Noah, Abraham, Moses, Jesus, Muhammad, Muhammad ibn Isma'il) is likewise thought to initiate a new world cycle.

The work consists of at least eleven different textual layers which were added over time, each of them containing slightly different versions of ghulat concepts and ideas. The earliest layers were written in 8th-/9th-century Kufa, perhaps partly by al-Mufaddal himself, or by his close associates Yunus ibn Zabyan and Muhammad ibn Sinan (died 835).

A possible indication for this is the fact that Muhammad ibn Sinan also wrote two works dealing with the theme of pre-existent, world-creating 'shadows': the Kitab al-Azilla ('Book of the Shadows') and the Kitab al-Anwar wa-hujub (Book of the Lights and the Veils). Biographical sources also list several other 8th-/9th-century Kufan authors who wrote a Kitab al-Azilla. In total, at least three works closely related to al-Mufaddal's Kitab al-Haft wa-l-azilla are extant, all likely dating to the 8th or 9th century:

1. Muhammad ibn Sinan's Kitab al-Anwar wa-hujub
2. an anonymous work called the Kitab al-Ashbah wa-l-azilla (Book of the Apparitions and the Shadows) (Note: On the anonymous Kitāb al-Ashbāh wa-l-aẓilla, see Asatryan 2015.)
3. another anonymous work also called the Kitab al-Azilla ('Book of the Shadows'). (Note: On the anonymous Kitāb al-Aẓilla (found in another work called the Kitāb al-Kursī), see Asatryan 2016, pp. 131–135.)

Though originating in the milieus of the early Kufan ghulat, the Kitab al-Haft wa-l-azilla was considerably expanded by members of a later ghulat sect called the Nusayris, who were active in 10th-century Syria. The Nusayris were probably also responsible for the work's final 11th-century form. Unlike most other ghulat works, the Kitab al-Haft wa-l-azilla was not preserved by the Nusayris, but by the Syrian Nizari Isma'ilis. Like the Umm al-kitab, which was transmitted by the Nizari Isma'ilis of Central Asia, it contains ideas that are largely unrelated to Isma'ili doctrine, but influenced various later Isma'ili authors starting from the 10th century.

=== Book of the Path (Kitab al-Sirat) ===
The Kitab al-Sirat (Book of the Path) is another purported dialogue between al-Mufaddal ibn Umar al-Ju'fi and Ja'far al-Sadiq, likely composed during the Minor Occultation (874–941). (Note: Edition of the Arabic text in Capezzone 1995 and Ibn ʿAbd al-Jalīl 2005. On this text, see also Capezzone 1993. It is not to be confused with the similarly named Kitāb al-Ṣirāṭ by the 9th-century ghulāt author Ishaq al-Ahmar al-Nakha'i (died 899, see Asatryan 2000–2012a; Asatryan 2017, p. 200, s.v. Isḥāq Aḥmar al-Nakhaʿī).) This work deals with the concept of an initiatory 'path' (sirat) leading the adept on a heavenly ascent towards God, with each of the seven heavens corresponding to one of seven degrees of spiritual perfection. It also contains references to such typically ghulat ideas as tajallin (the manifestation of God in human form), tanasukh (metempsychosis or transmigration of the soul), maskh/raskh (metamorphosis or reincarnation into non-human forms), and the concept of creation through the fall of pre-existent beings (as in the Kitab al-Haft wa-l-azilla, see above).

The philosophical background of the work is given by the late antique concept of a great chain of being linking all things together in one great cosmic hierarchy. This hierarchical system extends from the upper world of spirit and light (populated by angels and other pure souls) to the lower of world of matter and darkness (populated by humans, and below them animals, plants and minerals). Humanity is perceived as taking a middle position in this hierarchy, being located at the top of the world of darkness and at the bottom of the world of light.

Those human beings who lack the proper religious knowledge and belief are reborn into other human bodies, which are likened to 'shirts' (qumsan, sing. qamis) that a soul can put on and off again. This is called tanasukh or naskh. Grave sinners are reborn instead into animal bodies (maskh), and the worst offenders are reborn into the bodies of plants or minerals (raskh). (Note: This is also a common theme in other ghulāt texts. The Kitāb al-Haft wa-l-aẓilla goes a little bit further than the Kitāb al-Ṣirāṭ, also describing other forms of hierarchy within one class: among humans, female bodies rank below male ones, and among animals inedible species rank below edible ones; see Asatryan 2017, pp. 152–153.)

Believers who perform good works and advance in knowledge travel upwards on the ladder, putting on ever more pure and luminous 'shirts' or bodies, ultimately reaching the realm of the divine. This upwards path is represented as consisting of seven stages above that of humanity, each located in one of the seven heavens:

1. al-Mumtaha: the Tested, first heaven
2. al-Mukhlis: the Devout, second heaven
3. al-Mukhtass: the Elect, third heaven
4. al-Najib: the Noble, fourth heaven
5. al-Naqib: the Chief, fifth heaven
6. al-Yatim: the Unique, sixth heaven
7. al-Bab: the Gate, seventh heaven

At every degree the initiate receives the chance to gain a new level of 'hidden' or 'occult' (batin) knowledge. If the initiate succeeds at internalizing this knowledge, they may ascend to the next degree. If they lose interest or start to doubt the knowledge already acquired, they may lose their pure and luminous 'shirt', receiving instead a heavier and darker one, and descend down the scale of being again.

Those who reach the seventh degree (that of Bab or 'Gate') (Note: On the concept of Bāb in Shi'ism, see MacEoin 1988–2011.) are granted wondrous powers such as making themselves invisible, or seeing and hearing all things –including a beatific vision of God– without having to look or listen. Most notably, they are able to manifest themselves to ordinary beings in the world of matter, by taking on the form of a human and appearing to anyone at will. This ability to manifest in human form the 'Gates' in the seventh heaven share with God.

The theme of a heavenly ascent through seven degrees of spiritual perfection is also explored in other ghulat works, including the anonymous Kitab al-Maratib wa-l-daraj (Book of Degrees and Stages), as well as various works attributed to Muhammad ibn Sinan (died 835), Ibn Nusayr (died after 868), and others.

== Bibliography ==
=== Tertiary sources ===
- Amir-Moezzi, Mohammad Ali (2013). "Ḵaṭṭābiya". In Yarshater, Ehsan (ed.). Encyclopædia Iranica.
- Anthony, Sean W. (2013). "Kaysāniya". In Yarshater, Ehsan (ed.). Encyclopædia Iranica.
- Anthony, Sean W. (2018). "Ghulāt (extremist Shīʿīs)". In Fleet, Kate; Krämer, Gudrun; Matringe, Denis; Nawas, John; Rowson, Everett (eds.). Encyclopaedia of Islam, Three. doi:10.1163/1573-3912_ei3_COM_27473.
- Asatryan, Mushegh (2000–2012a). "Esḥāq Aḥmar Naḵaʿi". In Yarshater, Ehsan (ed.). Encyclopædia Iranica.
- Asatryan, Mushegh (2000–2012b). "Mofażżal al-Joʿfi". In Yarshater, Ehsan (ed.). Encyclopædia Iranica.
- Asatryan, Mushegh (2000–2013). "Moḵammesa". In Yarshater, Ehsan (ed.). Encyclopædia Iranica.
- Bar-Asher, Meir M. (2003). "Noṣayris". In Yarshater, Ehsan (ed.). Encyclopædia Iranica.
- Crone, Patricia (2011). "Ḵorramis". In Yarshater, Ehsan (ed.). Encyclopædia Iranica.
- Daftary, Farhad (1994). "Dawr (1)". In Yarshater, Ehsan (ed.). Encyclopædia Iranica.
- Daftary, Farhad (1990). "Carmatians". In Yarshater, Ehsan (ed.). Encyclopædia Iranica.
- Daftary, Farhad (2015). "Omm al-ketāb". In Yarshater, Ehsan (ed.). Encyclopædia Iranica.
- Friedman, Yaron (2000–2010). "Moḥammad b. Noṣayr". In Yarshater, Ehsan (ed.). Encyclopædia Iranica.
- Friedman, Yaron (2008–2012). "Ḵaṣibi". In Yarshater, Ehsan (ed.). Encyclopædia Iranica.
- Friedman, Yaron (2016). "al-Khaṣībī, Abū ʿAbdallāh". In Fleet, Kate; Krämer, Gudrun; Matringe, Denis; Nawas, John; Rowson, Everett (eds.). Encyclopaedia of Islam, Three. doi:10.1163/1573-3912_ei3_COM_30574.
- Gleave, Robert (2008–2012). "Jaʿfar al-Ṣādeq ii. Teachings". In Yarshater, Ehsan (ed.). Encyclopædia Iranica.
- Halm, Heinz (1960–2007). "Nuṣayriyya". In Bearman, P.; Bianquis, Th.; Bosworth, C.E.; van Donzel, E.; Heinrichs, W.P. (eds.). Encyclopaedia of Islam, Second Edition. doi:10.1163/1573-3912_islam_COM_0876.
- Halm, Heinz (1988). "Bāṭenīya". In Yarshater, Ehsan (ed.). Encyclopædia Iranica.
- Halm, Heinz (2001–2012). "Ḡolāt". In Yarshater, Ehsan (ed.). Encyclopædia Iranica.
- Hodgson, Marshall G.S. (1960–2007a). "Bayān b. Samʿān al-Tamīmī". In Bearman, P.; Bianquis, Th.; Bosworth, C.E.; van Donzel, E.; Heinrichs, W.P. (eds.). Encyclopaedia of Islam, Second Edition. doi:10.1163/1573-3912_islam_SIM_1299.
- Hodgson, Marshall G.S. (1960–2007b). "Ghulāt". In Bearman, P.; Bianquis, Th.; Bosworth, C.E.; van Donzel, E.; Heinrichs, W.P. (eds.). Encyclopaedia of Islam, Second Edition. doi:10.1163/1573-3912_islam_SIM_2517.
- Madelung, Wilferd (1960–2007). "al-Mughīriyya". In Bearman, P.; Bianquis, Th.; Bosworth, C.E.; van Donzel, E.; Heinrichs, W.P. (eds.). Encyclopaedia of Islam, Second Edition. doi:10.1163/1573-3912_islam_SIM_5322.
- MacEoin, Denis M. (1988–2011). "Bāb (1)". In Yarshater, Ehsan (ed.). Encyclopædia Iranica.
- Sachedina, Abdulaziz (1983–2012). "Abu'l-Ḵaṭṭāb Asadī". In Yarshater, Ehsan (ed.). Encyclopædia Iranica.
- Steigerwald, Diana (2010). "Ibn Nuṣayr". In Fleet, Kate; Krämer, Gudrun; Matringe, Denis; Nawas, John; Rowson, Everett (eds.). Encyclopaedia of Islam, Three. doi:10.1163/1573-3912_ei3_COM_23483.
- Walker, Paul E. (2011). "Bayān b. Samʿān". In Fleet, Kate; Krämer, Gudrun; Matringe, Denis; Nawas, John; Rowson, Everett (eds.). Encyclopaedia of Islam, Three. doi:10.1163/1573-3912_ei3_COM_23708. S2CID 186185243.

=== Secondary sources ===
- al-Qāḍī, Wadād (1974). al-Kaysāniyya fī l-tārīkh wa l-adab. Beirut: Dār al-ṯaqāfa.
- al-Qāḍī, Wadād (1976). "The Development of the Term Ghulāt in Muslim Literature with Special Reference to the Kaysāniyya". In Dietrich, Albert (ed.). Akten des VII. Kongresses für Arabistik und Islamwissenschaft. Abhandlungen der Akademie der Wissenschaften in Göttingen, Philologisch-historische Klasse, Dritte Folge, Nr. 98. Göttingen: Vandenhoeck & Ruprecht. pp. 295–319. ISBN 9780860787105. OCLC 48256257. (reprint in Kohlberg, Etan, ed. (2003). Shi'ism. The Formation of the Classical Islamic World. Vol. 33. Burlington: Ashgate. pp. 169–193.)
- Amir-Moezzi, Mohammad Ali (2020). "Les Imams et les Ghulāt. Nouvelles réflexions sur les relations entre imamisme « modéré » et shiʿisme « extrémiste »". Shii Studies Review. 4 (1–2): 5–38. doi:10.1163/24682470-12340053. S2CID 225742760.
- Amir-Moezzi, Mohammad Ali (2017). "Les cinq esprits de l'homme divin (Aspects de l'imamologie duodécimaine XIII)". In Van den Kerchove, Anna; Soares Santoprete, Luciana Gabriela (eds.). Gnose et manichéisme. Entre les oasis d'Égypte et la Route de la Soie: Hommage à Jean-Daniel Dubois. Bibliothèque de l'École des Hautes Études, Sciences Religieuses. Vol. 176. Turnhout: Brepols. pp. 377–398. doi:10.1484/M.BEHE-EB.4.01129. ISBN 978-2-503-56763-1.
- Adem, Rodrigo (2021). "Early Ismailism and the Gates of Religious Authority: Genealogizing the Theophanic Secret of Early Esoteric Shiʿism". Reason, Esotericism, and Authority in Shiʿi Islam. 2: 24–72. doi:10.1163/9789004465503_003. ISBN 9789004465503. S2CID 243417276.
- Amjad-Ali, Charles (1988). "The Problem of Islamic Gnosticism. A Review Article". Islamic Studies. 27 (3): 195–208. doi:10.52541/isiri.v27i03.5476.
- Anthony, Sean W. (2011). "The Legend of ʿAbdallāh ibn Sabaʾ and the Date of Umm al-Kitāb". Journal of the Royal Asiatic Society. 21 (1): 1–30. JSTOR 23011519.
- Anthony, Sean W. (2012). The Caliph and the Heretic: Ibn Sabaʾ and the Origins of Shīʿism. Islamic History and Civilization. Vol. 91. Leiden: Brill. doi:10.1163/9789004216068. ISBN 978-90-04-20930-5.
- Asatryan, Mushegh (2012). Heresy and Rationalism in Early Islam: The Origins and Evolution of the Mufaḍḍal-Tradition (PhD diss.). Yale University.
- Asatryan, Mushegh (2014). "Bankers and Politics: The Network of Shiʿi Moneychangers in Eighth-Ninth Century Kufa and their Role in the Shiʿi Community". Journal of Persianate Studies. 7: 1–21. doi:10.1163/18747167-12341262.
- Asatryan, Mushegh (2015). "An Early Shīʿi Cosmology: Kitāb al-ashbāḥ wa l-aẓilla and its Milieu". Studia Islamica. 110: 1–80. doi:10.1163/19585705-12341311.
- Asatryan, Mushegh (2016). "Shiite Underground Literature Between Iraq and Syria: "The Book of Shadows" and the History of the Early Ghulat". In Langermann, Y. Tzvi; Robinson, Robert G. (eds.). Texts in Transit in the Medieval Mediterranean. University Park: Pennsylvania State University Press. pp. 128–161. ISBN 9780271071091.
- Asatryan, Mushegh; Burns, Dylan M. (2016). "Is Ghulāt Religion Islamic Gnosticism? Religious Transmissions in Late Antiquity". In Amir-Moezzi, Mohammad Ali; De Cillis, Maria; De Smet, Daniel; Mir-Kasimov, Orkhan (eds.). L'Ésotérisme shi'ite, ses racines et ses prolongements – Shi'i Esotericism: Its Roots and Developments. Bibliothèque de l'Ecole des Hautes Etudes, Sciences Religieuses. Vol. 177. Turnhout: Brepols. pp. 55–86. doi:10.1484/M.BEHE-EB.4.01162. ISBN 978-2-503-56874-4.
- Asatryan, Mushegh (2017). Controversies in Formative Shiʿi Islam: The Ghulat Muslims and Their Beliefs. London: I.B. Tauris. ISBN 9781784538958.
- Asatryan, Mushegh (2019). "An agenda for the study of early Shiʿi cosmologies". In Trompf, G.; Johnston, J.; Mikkelsen, G. (eds.). The Gnostic World. Routledge Worlds Series. New York: Routledge. pp. 321–327. ISBN 9780367733124.
- Asatryan, Mushegh (2019). "Shiʿi Literature in the 9th Century: Isḥāq al- Aḥmar al-Nakhaʿī and his Writings". In Elias, J. J.; Orfali, B. (eds.). Light upon Light: Essays in Islamic Thought and History in Honor of Gerhard Bowering. Islamic History and Civilization. Leiden: Brill. pp. 164–181. ISBN 9789004410121.
- Asatryan, Mushegh (2020). "Early Ismailis and Other Muslims: Polemics and Borrowing in Kitāb al-Kashf". In Mir-Kasimov, Orkhan (ed.). Intellectual Interactions in the Islamic World: The Ismaili Thread. London: I.B. Tauris. pp. 273–298. ISBN 978-1-83860-485-1.
- Asatryan, Mushegh (2020). "The Good, the Bad, and the Heretic in Early Islamic History". In Daneshgar, Majid; Hughes, Aaron W. (eds.). Deconstructing Islamic Studies. Boston & DC: ILEX & Harvard University Press. pp. 204–252. ISBN 9780674244689.
- Asatryan, Mushegh (2022). "The Heretic Talks Back: Feigning Orthodoxy in Ṣaffār al-Qummī's Baṣāʾir al-Darajāt". History of Religions. 61 (4): 362–388. doi:10.1086/719004.
- Asatryan, Mushegh (2023). "Of Wine, Sex, and Other Abominations: The Meanings of Antinomianism in Early Islamic Iraq". Global Intellectual History. 9: 529–557. doi:10.1080/23801883.2022.2163911.
- Bar-Asher, Meir M.; Kofsky, Aryeh (2002). The Nusayrī-ʿAlawī Religion: An Enquiry into its Theology and Liturgy. Leiden: Brill. doi:10.1163/9789004453500. ISBN 978-90-04-12552-0.
- Bar-Asher, Meir M.; Kofsky, Aryeh (2021). The ʿAlawī Religion: An Anthology. Turnhout: Brepols. doi:10.1484/M.BEHE-EB.5.126666. ISBN 978-2-503-59781-2.
- Bayhom-Daou, Tamima (2003). "The Second-Century Šīʿite Ġulāt: Were They Really Gnostic?". Journal of Arabic and Islamic Studies. 5: 13–61. doi:10.5617/jais.4571.
- Beinhauer-Köhler, Bärbel (2004). "Die Engelsturzmotive des Umm al-Kitāb. Untersuchungen zur Trägerschaft eines synkretistischen Werkes der häretischen Schia". In Auffarth, Christoph; Stuckenbruck, Loren (eds.). The Fall of the Angels. Themes in Biblical Narrative. Vol. 6. Leiden: Brill. pp. 161–175. doi:10.1163/9789047404330_010. ISBN 978-90-04-12668-8. S2CID 245788384.
- Buckley, R. P. (1997). "The Early Shiite Ghulāh". Journal of Semitic Studies. 42 (2): 301–325. doi:10.1093/jss/XLII.2.301.
- Capezzone, Leonardo (1993). "Una nuova fonte per lo studio dell'eterodossia islamica: Il Kitāb al-ṣirāṭ attribuito a Mufaḍḍal b. ʿUmar al-Ğuʿfī". Rivista degli studi orientali. 67 (3/4): 265–273. JSTOR 41922961.
- Capezzone, Leonardo (1999). "Un aspetto della critica imamita alle tradizioni eterodosse: il Kitāb al-haft wa'l-azilla e le molteplici redazioni di un Kitāb al-azilla". Annali di Ca' Foscari. 38 (3): 171–193.
- Capezzone, Leonardo (2002). "La questione dell'eterodossia di Mufaḍḍal ibn ʿUmar al-Ğuʿfī nel Tanqīḥ al-Maqāl di al-Māmaqānī". Oriente Moderno. 21 (1): 147–157. doi:10.1163/22138617-08201010. JSTOR 25817817.
- Capezzone, Leonardo (2017). "Pre-existence and Shadows. A Gnostic Motif or a Literary One?". In Hassan, Iyas Hassan (ed.). La littérature aux marges du ʾadab. Regards croisés sur la prose arabe classique. Beirut/Marseille: Diacritiques Éditions/Institut français du Proche-Orient. pp. 336–361. ISBN 979-10-97093-00-6.
- Capezzone, Leonardo (2018). "The Host of Maʿlathāyā: A contribution to the study of the Imami Shiite construction of orthodoxy". Journal Asiatique. 306 (2): 187–99. doi:10.2143/JA.306.2.3285611.
- Capezzone, Leonardo (2020). "The Solitude of the Orphan: Ǧābir b. Ḥayyān and the Shiite Heterodox Milieu of the Third/Ninth–Fourth/Tenth Centuries". Bulletin of the School of Oriental and African Studies. 83 (1): 51–73. doi:10.1017/S0041977X20000014. S2CID 214044897.
- Crone, Patricia (2012). The Nativist Prophets in Early Islamic Iran: Rural Revolt and Local Zoroastrianism. Cambridge: Cambridge University Press. ISBN 9781139088459.
- De Smet, Daniel (2007). "Scarabées, scorpions, cloportes et corps camphrés. Métamorphose, réincarnation et génération spontanée dans l'hétérodoxie chiite". In Vrolijk, A.; Hogendijk, J. P. (eds.). O ye, Gentlemen. Arabic Studies on Science and Literary Culture in Honour of Remke Kruk. Leiden: Brill. pp. 39–54. doi:10.1163/ej.9789004157941.i-536.8. ISBN 978-90-04-15794-1.
- De Smet, Daniel (2016). "Les racines docétistes de l'imamologie shi'ite". In Amir-Moezzi, Mohammad Ali; De Cillis, Maria; De Smet, Daniel; Mir-Kasimov, Orkhan (eds.). L'Ésotérisme shi'ite, ses racines et ses prolongements – Shi'i Esotericism: Its Roots and Developments. Bibliothèque de l'Ecole des Hautes Etudes, Sciences Religieuses. Vol. 177. Turnhout: Brepols. pp. 87–112. doi:10.1484/M.BEHE-EB.4.01163. ISBN 978-2-503-56874-4.
- De Smet, Daniel (2018). "Le mythe des préadamites en islam chiite". Intellectual History of the Islamicate World. 6 (3): 252–280. doi:10.1163/2212943X-00603002. S2CID 243877005.
- De Smet, Daniel (2020). "The Intellectual Interactions of Yemeni Ṭayyibism with the Early Shiʿi Tradition". In Mir-Kasimov, Orkhan (ed.). Intellectual Interactions in the Islamic World: The Ismaili Thread. London: I.B. Tauris. pp. 299–321. ISBN 978-1-83860-485-1.
- De Smet, Daniel (2021). ""Le mal ne s'enracine pas dans l'instauration". La question du mal dans le shi'isme ismaélien" (PDF). Oriens. 49 (3–4): 181–215. doi:10.1163/18778372-12340004. S2CID 244755348.
- De Smet, Daniel (2021). "Les hérétiques musulmans: un Lumpenproletariat au ban de la société ?". In De Smet, Daniel; Lebrun, René; Cannuyer, Christian (eds.). Regards des civilisations orientales sur les personnes en situation de vulnérabilité. Volume du centenaire de la S.R.B.É.O. Acta Orientalia Belgica. Vol. 34. Bruxelles: Société Royale Belge d'Études Orientales. pp. 293–317.
- De Smet, Daniel (2022). "The city of Kūfa, the birthplace of Shiʿism and a center of debates about the delegation of divine powers (tafwīḍ)". Jerusalem Studies in Arabic and Islam. 51: 149–188.
- Filippani-Ronconi, Pio (1964). "Note sulla soteriologia e sul simbolismo cosmico dell'Ummu'l-kitāb". AION. 14 (1): 111–134.
- Filippani-Ronconi, Pio (1977). "The Soteriological Cosmology of Central-Asiatic Ismā'īlism". In Nasr, S. Hossein (ed.). Ismā'īlī Contributions to Islamic Culture. Tehran: Imperial Iranian Academy of Philosophy. pp. 99–120.
- Friedman, Yaron (2010). The Nuṣayrī-ʿAlawīs: An Introduction to the Religion, History and Identity of the Leading Minority in Syria. Islamic History and Civilization. Vol. 77. Leiden: Brill. doi:10.1163/ej.9789004178922.i-328. ISBN 978-90-04-17892-2.
- Freitag, Rainer (1985). Seelenwanderung in der islamischen Häresie. Berlin: Klaus Schwarz Verlag. ISBN 978-0-7556-5386-7.
- Gillon, Fârès (2024). The Book of Unveiling: Early Fatimid Ismaili Doctrine in the Kitāb al-Kashf, attributed to Jaʿfar b. Manṣūr al-Yaman. London: I.B. Tauris. ISBN 9783922968443.
- Halm, Heinz (1978a). Kosmologie und Heilslehre der frühen Ismā 'īlīya: Eine Studie zur islamischen Gnosis. Abhandlungen für die Kunde des Morgenlandes. Vol. XLIV. Wiesbaden: Franz Steiner.
- Halm, Heinz (1978b). "Das "Buch der Schatten". Die Mufaḍḍal-Tradition der Ġulāt und die Ursprünge des Nuṣairiertums. I. Die Überlieferer der häretischen Mufaḍḍal-Tradition". Der Islam. 55 (2): 219–266. doi:10.1515/islm.1978.55.2.219. S2CID 160481806.
- Halm, Heinz (1981). "Das "Buch der Schatten". Die Mufaḍḍal-Tradition der Ġulāt und die Ursprünge des Nuṣairiertums. II. Die Stoffe". Der Islam. 58 (1): 15–86. doi:10.1515/islm.1981.58.1.15. S2CID 162219074.
- Halm, Heinz (1982). Die islamische Gnosis: Die extreme Schia und die ʿAlawiten. Zürich and München: Artemis Verlag. ISBN 978-3-7608-4530-2.
- Halm, Heinz (2016). "Le « Livre des Ombres » et le mythe de la création". In Amir-Moezzi, Mohammad Ali; De Cillis, Maria; De Smet, Daniel; Mir-Kasimov, Orkhan (eds.). L'Ésotérisme shi'ite, ses racines et ses prolongements – Shi'i Esotericism: Its Roots and Developments. Bibliothèque de l'Ecole des Hautes Etudes, Sciences Religieuses. Vol. 177. Turnhout: Brepols. pp. 387–393. doi:10.1484/M.BEHE-EB.4.01177. ISBN 978-2-503-56874-4.
- Hämeen-Anttila, Jaakko (2001). "Ascent and Descent in Islamic Myth". In Whiting, Robert M. (ed.). Mythology and Mythologies: Methodological Approaches to Intercultural Influences. Proceedings of the Second Annual Symposium of the Assyrian and Babylonian Intellectual Heritage Project Held in Paris, France, October 4-7, 1999. Helsinki: Neo-Assyrian Text Corpus Project. pp. 47–67. ISBN 9789514590498. OCLC 912739664. (situates the Umm al-kitāb in its Mesopotamian context)
- Hodgson, M.G.S. (1955). "How Did the Early Shî'a Become Sectarian?". Journal of the American Oriental Society. 75 (1): 1–13. doi:10.2307/595031. JSTOR 595031. (reprint in Kohlberg 2003, pp. 3–15)
- Hollenberg, David (2016). Beyond the Qur'an: Early Isma'ili Ta'wil and the Secrets of the Prophets. Columbia: University of South Carolina Press. ISBN 9781611176797.
- Ivanow, Wladimir (1932). "Notes sur l'Ummu'l-kitab des Ismaëliens de l'Asie Centrale". Revue des Études Islamiques. 6: 419–481.
- Kechavarzi, Dariouche (2022). "Hérésiographie et mémoire des origines en islam. L'effacement de l'apocalyptique dans la représentation des hérésies shi'ites". Revue de l'histoire des religions. 3: 387–424. doi:10.4000/rhr.11968.
- Kechavarzi, Dariouche (2023). "De l'histoire des hérésies à l'historiographie des orthodoxies. Étude sur la fonction de l'hérésiographie musulmane à la fin du IIIe/IXe siècle". Revue de l'histoire des religions. 1: 5–32. doi:10.4000/rhr.12225.
- Madelung, Wilferd (1963). "Kitāb al-haft wa-l-aẓilla (book review)". Der Islam. 38: 180–182.
- Massignon, Louis (1938). "Recherches sur les Shi'ites extrémistes à Bagdad à la fin du troisième siècle de l'Hégire". Zeitschrift der Deutschen Morgenländischen Gesellschaft. 92 (3/4): 378–382. JSTOR 43381616.
- Michelangelo, Guidi (1935). "La gnose et les sectes musulmanes shīʿites". Annuaire de l'Institut de Philologie et d'Histoire Orientale. 3. Bruxelles: Institut de Philologie et d'Histoire Orientales: 199–216.
- Modaressi, Hossein (1993). Crisis and Consolidation in the Formative Period of Shīʿīte Islam. Princeton: Darwin Press. ISBN 9780878500956.
- Modaressi, Hossein (2003). Tradition and Survival: A Bibliographical Survey of Early Shīʿite Literature. Oxford: Oneworld. ISBN 1-85168-331-3.
- Morony, Michael G. (1984). Iraq after the Muslim Conquest. Princeton: Princeton University Press. ISBN 0691053952.
- Musa, Matti (1987). Extremist Shiites: The Ghulat Sects. New York: Syracuse University Press. ISBN 978-0815637691.
- Pachniak, Katarzyna (2011). "The Doctrine of muẖammisa according to Muslim Heresiography". Rocznik Orientalistyczny. 64 (1): 204–212.
- Radtke, Bernd (1990). "Iranian and Gnostic Elements in Early Taṣawwuf. Observations concerning the Umm al-Kitāb". In Gnoli, Gherardo; Panaino, Antonio (eds.). Proceedings of the first European Conference of Iranian Studies held in Turin, September 7th-11th, 1987 by the Societas Iranologica Europaea. Volume 2: Middle and New Iranian Studies. Rome: Istituto italiano per il Medio ed Estremo Oriente. pp. 519–529. ISBN 9788863230765. OCLC 956121455.
- Reeves, John C. (2019). "Questions of Gnostic influence on early Islam". In Mikkelsen, Gunner B.; Johnston, Jay; Trompf, Garry W. (eds.). The Gnostic World. London & New York: Routledge. pp. 307–320. doi:10.4324/9781315561608-29. ISBN 9780367733124.
- Rekaya, Mohamed (1984). "Le Ḫurram-dīn et les mouvements ḫurramites sous les 'Abbāsides: Réapparition du Mazdakisme ou Manifestation des Ġulāt-Musulmans Dans l'Ex-Empire Sassanide aux VIIIe et IXe siècles AP. J.-C.?". Studia Islamica. 60 (60): 5–57. doi:10.2307/1595508. JSTOR 1595508.
- Stern, S. M. (1983). Studies in Early Ismāʻīlism. Jerusalem: Magnes Press. ISBN 9652233889.
- Tendler Krieger, Bella (2016). "'Abd Allāh b. Saba' and the Role of the Nuṣayrī Bāb. Rehabilitating the Heresiarchs of the Islamic Tradition". In Amir-Moezzi, Mohammad Ali; De Cillis, Maria; De Smet, Daniel; Mir-Kasimov, Orkhan (eds.). L'Ésotérisme shi'ite, ses racines et ses prolongements – Shi'i Esotericism: Its Roots and Developments. Bibliothèque de l'Ecole des Hautes Etudes, Sciences Religieuses. Vol. 177. Turnhout: Brepols. pp. 441–472. doi:10.1484/M.BEHE-EB.4.01181. ISBN 978-2-503-56874-4.
- Thomassen, Einar (2017). "The melothesia of the Apocryphon of John and the Umm al-kitāb". In Van den Kerchove, Anna; Soares Santoprete, Luciana Gabriela (eds.). Gnose et manichéisme. Entre les oasis d'Égypte et la Route de la Soie: Hommage à Jean-Daniel Dubois. Bibliothèque de l'École des Hautes Études. Vol. 176. Turnhout: Brepols. pp. 161–172. doi:10.1484/M.BEHE-EB.4.01118. ISBN 978-2-503-56763-1.
- Tijdens, E. F. (1977). "Der mythologisch-gnostische Hintergrund des Umm al-kitâb". Acta Iranica. VII: 241–526. OCLC 470066089.
- Tucker, William F. (2008). Mahdis and Millenarians: Shī'ite Extremists in Early Muslim Iraq. Cambridge: Cambridge University Press. doi:10.1017/CBO9780511512094. ISBN 9780511512094. (reprint of four earlier papers published between 1975 and 1980)
- Turner, Colin P. (2006). "The "Tradition of Mufaḍḍal" and the Doctrine of the Rajʿa: Evidence of Ghuluww in the Eschatology of Twelver Shiʿism?". Iran. 44: 175–195. doi:10.1080/05786967.2006.11834685. JSTOR 4300708. S2CID 170603436.
- Wasserstrom, Steve (1985). "The Moving Finger Writes: Mughīra b. Saʿīd's Islamic Gnosis and the Myths of Its Rejection". History of Religions. 25 (1): 1–29. doi:10.1086/463019. S2CID 161366534.
- Wasserstrom, Steve (1993). "Sefer Yesira and Early Islam: A Reappraisal". Journal of Jewish Thought and Philosophy. 3 (1): 1–30. doi:10.1163/105369994790231138.
- Wasserstrom, Steve (2002). "Further Thoughts on the Origins of "Sefer yeṣirah"". Aleph. 2 (2): 201–221. doi:10.2979/ale.2002.-.2.201.
- Wasserstrom, Steve (1995). Between Muslim and Jew: The Problem of Symbiosis under Early Islam. Princeton: Princeton University Press. ISBN 0-691-03455-9.

=== Primary sources ===
Alawite Heritage Series

- Abū Mūsā; al-Shaykh Mūsā, eds. (2006–2013). Silsilat al-turath al-ʿalawī. Diyār ʿAql (Lebanon): Dār li-Ajl al-Maʿrifa. OCLC 652937966. (12 vols., collection of early ghulāt texts and texts from the medieval Nusayri-Alawi tradition)

al-Mufaddal, Kitāb al-Haft wa-l-aẓilla

- Asatryan, Mushegh (2020). "Early Ismailis and Other Muslims: Polemics and Borrowing in Kitāb al-Kashf". In Mir-Kasimov, Orkhan (ed.). Intellectual Interactions in the Islamic World: The Ismaili Thread. London: I.B. Tauris. pp. 273–298. ISBN 978-1-83860-485-1. (pp. 196–198 contain a critical edition of chapter 59)
- Ghālib, Muṣṭafā (1964). al-Haft al-Sharīf. Beirut: Dār al-Andalus. OCLC 977409505.
- Tāmir, ʿĀrif; Khalifé, Ignace Abdo (1960). Kitāb al-Haft wa-l-'Aẓillat, attribué à al-Mufaḍḍal ibn ʻUmar al-Ǧaʻfī, rapportant les paroles de l'Imām Ǧaʻfar ibn M. aṣ-Ṣādiq. Beirut: Impr. Catholique. OCLC 459827793.
- Tāmir, ʿĀrif (2007) [1981]. Kitāb al-haft wa-l-aẓilla. Beirut: Dār wa-Maktabat al-Hilāl. ISBN 978-9953-75-266-2. (edition based on a different ms. compared to Tāmir & Khalifé 1960)

al-Mufaddal, Kitāb al-Ṣirāṭ

- Capezzone, Leonardo (1995). "Il Kitāb al-Ṣirāṭ attribuito a Mufaḍḍal ibn ʿUmar al-Ğuʿfī: Edizione del ms. unico (Paris, Bibliothèque Nationale Ar. 1449/3) e studio introduttivo". Rivista degli studi orientali. 69 (3–4): 295–416. JSTOR 41880880.
- Ibn ʿAbd al-Jalīl, al-Munṣif (2005). Kitāb al-Ṣirāṭ. Beirut: Dār al-Madār al-Islāmī. ISBN 9789959292636. OCLC 812186733.

Anonymous, Kitāb al-Ashbāh wa-l-aẓilla

- Asatryan, Mushegh (2015). "An Early Shīʿi Cosmology: Kitāb al-ashbāḥ wa l-aẓilla and its Milieu". Studia Islamica. 110: 1–80. doi:10.1163/19585705-12341311.

Anonymous, Kitāb al-usūs

- Dandašī, al-Kanj. Kitāb al-usūs in Madkhal ilā al-maḏhab al-ʿalawī al-nuṣayrī. Irbil. pp. 73–156.

Umm al-kitāb

- Filippani-Ronconi, Pio (1966). Ummu'l-kitab: Introduzione, traduzione e note di Pio Filippani-Ronconi. Napoli: Istituto Universitario Orientale di Napoli. ISBN 978-88-97278-43-6. OCLC 635942972. (Italian translation)
- Halm, Heinz (1981). "Das "Buch der Schatten". Die Mufaḍḍal-Tradition der Ġulāt und die Ursprünge des Nuṣairiertums. II. Die Stoffe". Der Islam. 58 (1): 15–86. doi:10.1515/islm.1981.58.1.15. S2CID 162219074. (German translations of parts of the text on pp. 36 ff.)
- Halm, Heinz (1982). Die islamische Gnosis: Die Schia und die ʿAlawiten. Zürich and München: Artemis Verlag. ISBN 978-3-7608-4530-2. (German translations of parts of the text on pp. 113 ff.)
- Ivanow, Wladimir (1936). "Ummu᾽l-kitāb". Der Islam. 23 (1–2): 1–132. doi:10.1515/islm.1936.23.1-2.1. S2CID 211485267. (edition of the Persian text)
- Tijdens, E. F. (1977). "Der mythologisch-gnostische Hintergrund des Umm al-kitâb". Acta Iranica. VII: 241–526. OCLC 470066089. (contains a partial German translation)

Other

- al-Majlisi, Muhammad Baqir (1983). Biḥār al-anwār al-jāmiʿa li-durar akhbār al-aʾimma al-aṭhār. Beirut: Dār Iḥyāʾ al-Turāth al-ʿArabī. (al-Mufaddal's Mā yakūn ʿinda ẓuhūr al-Mahdī in vol. 53, pp. 1–38 & ḥadīth al-maʿrifa bi-l-nūrāniyya in vol. 26)
- Tāmir, ʿĀrif (1957). al-Ḥikam al-Jaʿfariyya, li-l-Imām al-Ṣādiq Jaʿfar ibn Muḥammad. Beirut: al-Maṭbaʿa al-Kāthūlīkiyya. OCLC 23505958. (transmitted by al-Mufaddal)
