= Sayf ibn Umar =

8th century Islamic historian

Sayf ibn 'Umar
- ابو عبد اللة سيف بن عمر التميم
- Born: Unknown date Kufa, Iraq
- Died: c. 180/ 796
- Occupation: Historian
- Era: Early Abbasid period
- Known for: Being a source for al-Tabari (839–923), and the person which reputation as a compiler of prophetic hadith was contested by the later sunni hadith critics.
- Notable work: The Great book of Conquests and Apostasy Wars (Kitāb al-futūh al-kabīr wa-l-ridda)

Sayf ibn 'Umar al-Usayyidi al-Tamimi (Arabic: سيف بن عمر) was an 8th-century Islamic compiler of historical reports(in Arabic:اخبار), who also happened to transmit utterings pertaining to prophet Muhammad(hadith). He lived in Kufa. He wrote the Kitāb al-futūh al-kabīr wa-l-ridda ('The Great book of Conquests and Apostasy Wars'), which was the later historian al-Tabari's (839–923) main source for the Ridda wars and the early Islamic conquests. It also contains important information on the structure of early Muslim armies and government. According to al-Dhahabi, Sayf died during the reign of Harun al-Rashid (786–809).

== Life ==
Little is known about Sayf, except that he lived in Kufa(and probably ended his days there). He belonged to the tribe of Banu Tamim.

== Reliability ==
The reliability of his hadith was seriously questioned by the later hadith critics.

Since he was considered by some, the sole transmitter of many of his historical narrations, especially pertaining to the conquest of Iraq, several historians have accused him of fabrication or exaggeration, most notably Julius Wellhausen. His narrations are said to be influenced by the tribal traditions of Banu Tamim. He also collected accounts that highlight other tribes.

Recent scholarship suggests that Sayf is more reliable than previously thought. W. F. Tucker and Ella Landau-Tasseron note that although Sayf may have been an unscrupulous hadith collector, this should not detract from his general reliability as a transmitter of historical information (akhbārī). Tucker adds that accusations of bias could equally be leveled at other akhbārīs contemporary to Sayf, including the Shi'a historian Abu Mikhnaf. Fuat Sezgin, Albrecht Noth, and Martin Hinds have also challenged Wellhausen's views and placed Sayf on an equal footing with other traditionalists.

As well, it should be noticed, that one of his students was a well-known for his pro-shii's inclinations transmitter and the author of his own book about The Battle of Tzifin - Naser b. Muzahem (d. 212/ 827)
