= Jabir ibn Yazid al-Ju'fi =

Early Shi'i (ghulat) traditionist

Jābir ibn Yazīd al-Juʿfī (Arabic: جابر بن یزید الجُعفی), died c. 745–750, was a Kufan transmitter of hadith and a companion of the Shi'a Imams Muhammad al-Baqir (677–732) and Ja'far al-Sadiq (c. 700–765). His reputation among later Muslims was uneven: while some Sunni and Shia scholars considered him a reliable authority, others rejected him for his alleged 'extremist' or 'exaggerated' (ghulāt) ideas. In some sources he is said to have followed the ideas of the 'exaggerator' al-Mughira ibn Sa'id, while other sources deny this.

He was sometimes recognized as the bāb (gate) of the fifth Twelver Shia Imam Muhammad al-Baqir, who related 70 (or 70000) secret hadiths to him. Jabir is also the main narrator of some other hadiths which are collected in a book named Risālat al-Juʿfi. Shia do not reject Jabir as a ghali (lit. 'one who exaggerates'), possibly because he sided with al-Baqir in the conflict with al-Mughira bin Sa'id al-'Ijli, the well-known ghali.

Jabir is also transmitter of the ghulāt book Umm al-Kitāb, which contains Muhammad al-Baqir's answers to questions posed by his followers. In the main part of this book, al-Baqir reveals secrets to al-Ju'fi, such as how the cosmos was created, how the human soul fell into this world, and how it could be delivered from it. Ibn Hajar says: Abu Na'eem on the authority of Thori said that whenever Jabir hadith says: Hadathna and tell us, his narration is correct. According to Sufyan, Ibn Mahdi said, "I have never seen anyone more pious than him in narrating hadith." Ibn Aliyyah said on the authority of Sha'ba that: Jabir is a Sadiq in narrating the hadith. Also, Yahya bin Abi Bakir, on the authority of Shuba, said that: Whenever Jabir says hadith and hearsay, he is one of the most reliable people. It has also been narrated from Zuhair bin Muawiyah: When he used to say: You heard, he was one of the most truthful people. Vaqi' says: "Doubt whatever you want, but do not doubt that Jabir is trustworthy." Adel Nawihaz says: "Jabir is one of the followers and jurists of the Imamiyyah and from the people of Kufa; It has many traditions. His knowledge of religion is abundant. Some of the great scholars of hadith have praised him and others have accused him of believing in Rajat. Jaber died in Kufa. He has a book called "Tafseer al-Qur'an". Zarkali mentioned it in the book "Alam". Sheikh Tusi considered him one of the companions of Imam Baqir and Jafar Sadiq. According to Henry Corbin, this book resembles the Infancy Gospel of Thomas, thus illustrating a similarity between Shia Imamology and Gnostic Christology. A major concept of this work is the description of the numinous experience. Its central motif is the psychological and philosophical explanation of spiritual symbols, with believers instructed to perform acts of self-purification and renewal. Colors are used to symbolize theories and levels of consciousness which one must recognize in oneself.

== Name ==
His kunya is mentioned in the sources as Abu Abdullah, Abu Muhammad and Abu Yazid, but it seems that Abu Muhammad is most commonly used. Apart from al-Ju'fi, in some sources his nisba is also mentioned as al-Kufi.

== Relationships with Shi'a Imams ==
The year of his arrival in Medina will be around 96. According to the report that was quoted from Jabir, in his first meeting with the fifth Shi'a Imam Muhammad Baqir, he introduced himself as a Kufi and from the Ju'fi family, and his motivation was to learn from al-Baqir.

To travel to Medina, but probably because of the sensitivity of the people of Medina towards the Kufis of the Shia religion, the Imam al-Baqir asked Jabir to tell the people of Medina that he is from Medina, because whoever enters the city and does not leave it, is considered one of them. In this meeting, the Imam gave two books to Jabir and asked him not to reveal the contents of one of these two books during the rule of the Umayyads, and to reveal its contents after the decline of their rule. If this narration is correct, it reveals Jabir's high position with al-Baqir.

Jabir was also a faqih (jurist). Traditional Shia and Sunni literature contains conflicting reports and narrations about Jabir, which have caused different and even contradictory opinions about his status. The sixth Shia Imam Ja'far al-Sadiq is said to have regarded Jabir as Salman the Persian was regarded by the prophet Muhammad. But in another case, al-Sadiq forbade Jabir's name to be mentioned, because he believed that if the ignorant people would hear his hadiths, they would mock him. In another case, Jabir said to al-Baqir: You have entrusted me with words and secrets that are very heavy and sometimes make me lose my patience and I feel go crazy. His relatives advised him to go to the desert in such a situation and dig a deep pit and tell secrets there.

Jabir is said to have acquired most of his knowledge in Medina from the Imam al-Baqir and to have studied with him for 18 years. He purportedly heard about 70,000 hadiths, but he did not tell anyone about 50,000 hadiths.

Jabir probably met the Imam Ja'far al-Sadiq in Iraq and is said to have heard narrations from him. Jabir was a very active narrator. It is said that if Jabir did not exist, Kufa would be devoid of hadith.
