= Grupo Planeta =

Spanish mass media conglomerate

Planeta Corporación, S.R.L.

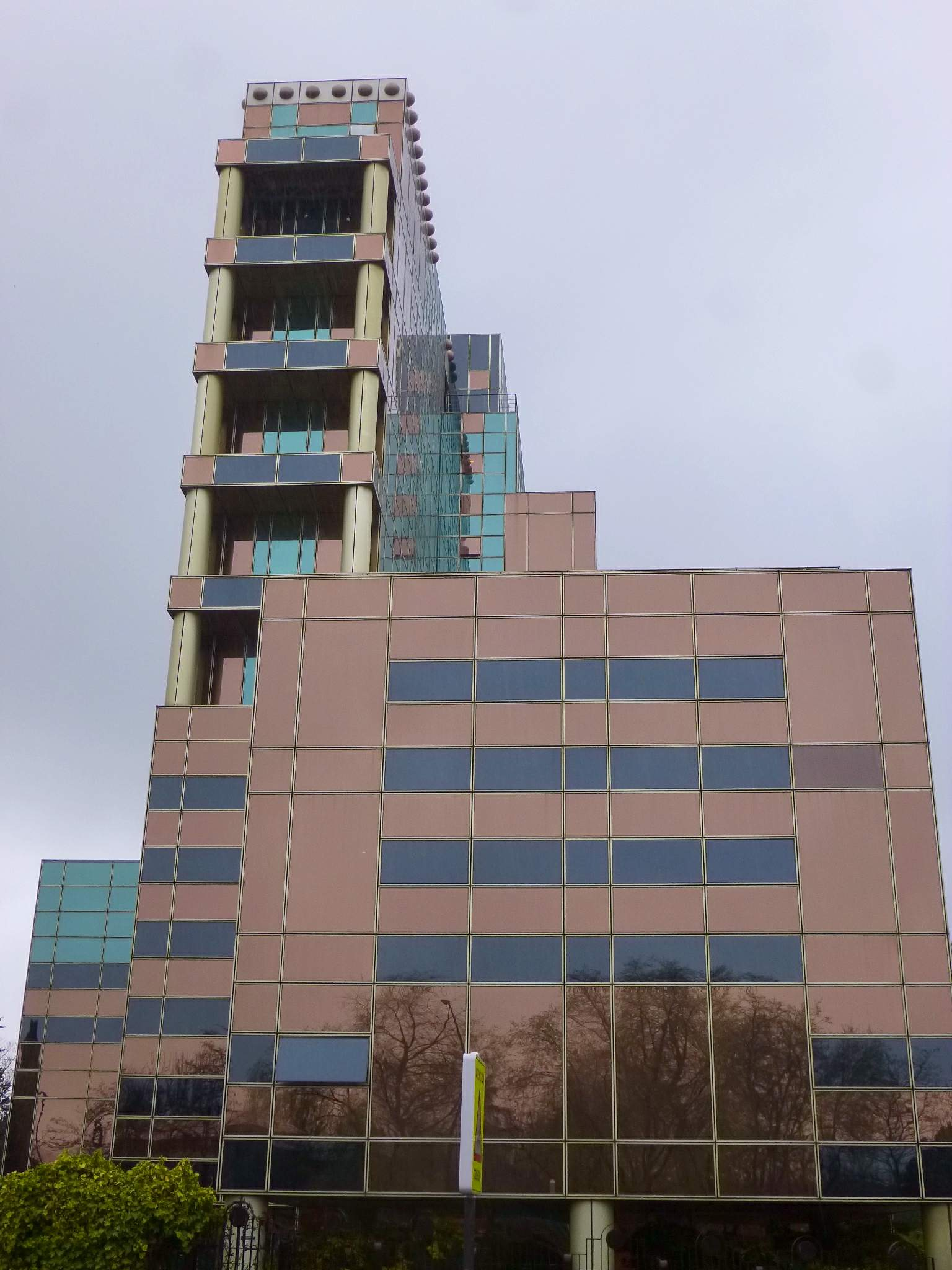
- Current head office
- Type: Sociedad de Responsabilidad Limitada
- Industry: Mass media
- Founder: José Manuel Lara Hernández
- Headquarters: Madrid, Spain
- Key people: José Creuheras (president)
- Products: Publishing, broadcasting, television production, film production
- Revenue: 1,950,000,000 (2005)
- Net income: 375,000,000 (2024)
- Number of employees: 4,500 (2017)
- Website: www.planeta.es

Planeta Corporación, S.R.L., doing business as Grupo Planeta (lit. 'Planet Group'), is a Spanish mass media conglomerate operating in Spain, Portugal, France and Latin America. It is headquartered in Madrid.

Editorial Planeta, founded in 1949, was the seed of Grupo Planeta, which includes many more publishing imprints as well as other media assets. Planeta is the primary shareholder of the media group Atresmedia (dominating alongside Mediaset España the free-to-air television landscape in Spain under a duopoly) and the publisher of the Conservative newspaper La Razón. Since 1952, Planeta awards the Premio Planeta de Novela literary prize.

== History ==
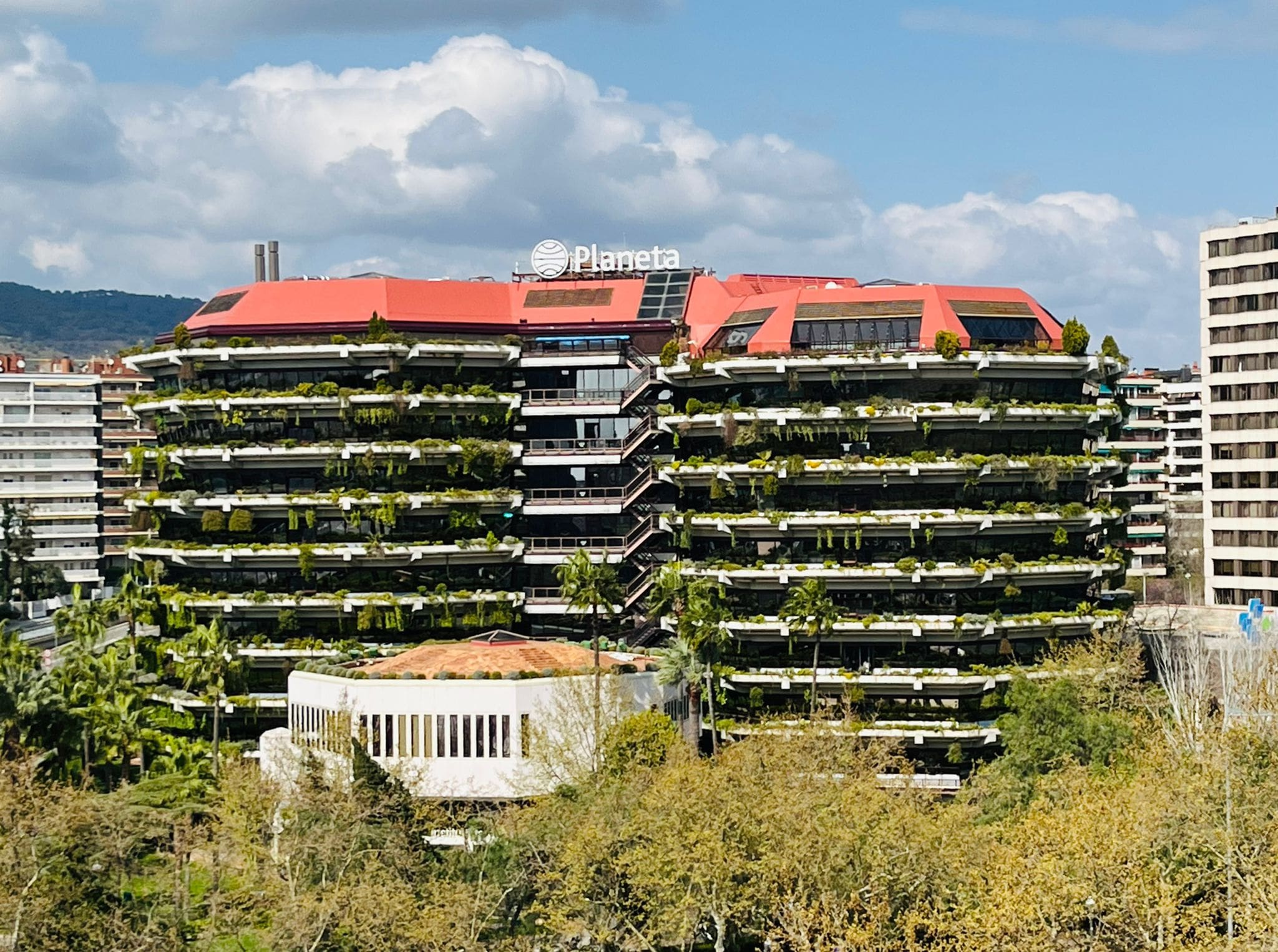
Former head office of Planeta in Barcelona

The company was founded as Editorial Planeta in 1949. José Manuel Lara Hernández was the founder of the company. Starting in 1952, the publishing group awards the Premio Planeta de Novela literary prize.

The company expanded from Spain to the Latin American market in the mid-1960s.

In 1992, Planeta acquired the Espasa Calpe publishing company and the Casa del Libro bookstore chain.

José Manuel Lara Hernández's son, José Manuel Lara Bosch, became the company president upon the death of his father in 2003. Also in 2003, Planeta became the primary shareholder of Antena 3.

The merger of Antena 3 with LaSexta (by means of the absorption of the latter) was announced in December 2011 even though it was not formalised until October 2012. After the merger, LaSexta somewhat retained a perception of a left-leaning profile, starkly contrasting to those of the rest of Planeta media properties.

With its purchase of Editis in 2009, Planeta became one of the largest publishers in the world, with over 1 billion dollars of revenue that year. Both in 2013 and 2014, the company was the eight largest book publisher in the world.

Following the death of Lara Bosch in 2015, José Creuheras Margenat became the president of the company.

Hitherto headquartered in Barcelona, Grupo Planeta decided to move its head office to Madrid in October 2017 because of the "uncertainty" caused by the thwarted Catalan declaration of independence.

== Selected imprints ==
- Editorial Planeta (including Planeta Cómic)
- Ediciones Destino
- Emecé Editores
- Joaquín Mortiz
- Planeta DeAgostini
- Planeta Junior
- Seix Barral
- Grup62

== See also ==
- Media of Spain
- Books in Spain
