= José Manuel Lara Bosch =

Spanish media executive (1946–2015)

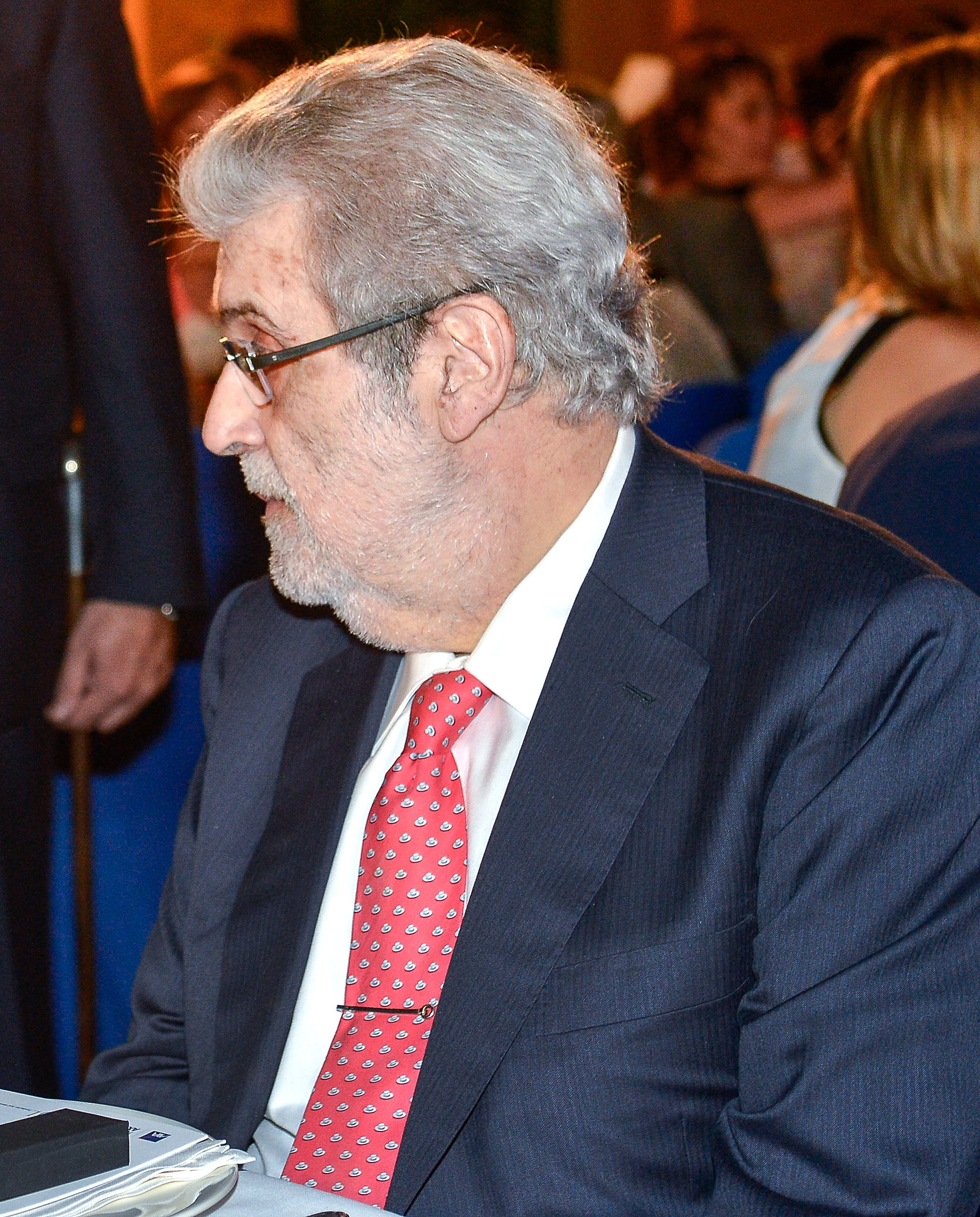
Lara Bosch in June 2005

José Manuel Lara Bosch, 2nd Marquess of Pedroso de Lara (8 March 1946 – 31 January 2015) was a Spanish media executive and businessman. He was the CEO of Grupo Planeta since 2003 and Atresmedia since 2012. Bosch was born in Barcelona, Spain. He was married to Consuelo García Píriz for forty years, and they had four children. Bosch died in Barcelona, Spain from pancreatic cancer, aged 68.

== Other websites ==
Quotations related to José Manuel Lara Bosch at Wikiquote
