= Alice-Mary Talbot =

Byzantine historian

Alice-Mary Talbot (also Alice-Mary Maffry Talbot; born May 16, 1939) is an American Byzantinist. She is director of Byzantine studies emerita, Dumbarton Oaks Research Library and Collection.

Her particular expertise is the social context of Byzantine religious practices, including hagiography, monasticism, and gender studies. Much of her work has focused on the edition and translation of Byzantine texts.

== Education and career ==
Talbot received a B.A. in Classics from Radcliffe College. She completed her M.A. and PhD (1970) in Byzantine and Ottoman History at Columbia University. Her doctoral thesis was entitled The correspondence of Athanasius, patriarch of Constantinople (1289–1293; 1303–1309) with the emperor Andronicus II (two volumes). Her PhD supervisor was Ihor Ševčenko. Talbot taught at several colleges in Ohio, as well as being a junior fellow of Byzantine studies (1966–1968) at Dumbarton Oaks. She was a senior fellow of Byzantine studies (1978–1983) at Dumbarton Oaks, and a Byzantine studies visiting senior research associate (1991–1992). She was the advisor for the Hagiography Project (1992–1997) and the advisor for Byzantine publications (1996–1997). From 1997 to 2009 she was director of Byzantine studies and editor of Dumbarton Oaks Papers. She was a senior fellow (ex-officio) of Byzantine Studies (1997–2008). She was the Executive Editor of the Oxford Dictionary of Byzantium, published in 1991.

Talbot's scholarship profoundly influenced the field of Byzantine studies in America and Europe. She has authored four books, is the editor or co-editor of four further books, and is the author of more than seventy articles. She was president of the Medieval Academy of America during 2011–12.

== Honours ==
In 2010, Talbot was elected a Fellow of the Medieval Academy of America. In 2012, Talbot was honoured with a Festschrift, Byzantine Religious Culture: Studies in Honor of Alice-Mary Talbot, published by Brill. This featured twenty-five contributions, and was edited by Denis Sullivan, Elizabeth A. Fisher, and Stratis Papaioannou. Talbot received an honorary doctorate from the University of St Andrews in 2015. In his laureation address, Tim Greenwood commented on Talbot that 'in a career spanning more than fifty years, she has profoundly transformed the study of religious culture in the world of Byzantium, both through her own scholarly output and her selfless support of others.'

== Selected bibliography ==
=== Books ===
- (edited, translated and commentary by Mary-Alice Talbot) The Correspondence of Athanasius I, Patriarch of Constantinople: Letters to the Emperor Andronicus II, members of the imperial family, and officials (Washington, D.C.: Dumbarton Oaks Center for Byzantine Studies, 1975)
- Faith Healing in Late Byzantium: The Posthumous Miracles of the Patriarch Athanasios I of Constantinople by Theoktistos the Stoudite (Brookline, Mass.: Hellenic College Press, 1983) ISBN 9780916586928
- Women and Religious Life in Byzantium (Aldershot: Ashgate, 2001) ISBN 9780860788737
- (translated with Scott Fitzgerald Johnson) Miracle Tales from Byzantium, Dumbarton Oaks Medieval Library 12 (Cambridge, Mass.: Harvard University Press, 2012) ISBN 9780674059030
- (Denis F Sullivan; Alice-Mary Talbot; George T. Dennis) The History of Leo the Deacon: Byzantine Military Expansion in the Tenth Century (Washington, D.C.: Dumbarton Oaks Research Library, 2017) ISBN 9780884023241

=== Edited works ===
- (edited with Alexander Kazhdan, et al.) Executive Editor of Oxford Dictionary of Byzantium, 3 vols. (New York, 1991)
- Holy Women of Byzantium: Ten Saints' Lives in English Translation (Washington D.C., 1996) ISBN 9780884022480
- Byzantine Defenders of Images: Eight Saints' Lives in English Translation (Washington D.C., 1998) ISBN 9780884022596
- (edited with Arietta Papaconstantinou) Becoming Byzantine: Children and Childhood in Byzantium (Washington, D.C.: Dumbarton Oaks Research Library and Collection, 2009) ISBN 9780884023982
- (edited with Richard P. H. Greenfield) Holy Men of Mount Athos, Dumbarton Oaks Medieval Library 40 (Cambridge, Mass.: Harvard University Press, 2016) ISBN 9780674088764
