= 29th Waffen Grenadier Division of the SS (1st Italian) =

German infantry division

- 29. Waffen-Grenadier-Division der SS (italienische Nr. 1)
- Unit insignia
- Active: 2 October 1943 – 30 April 1945
- Country: Italian Social Republic
- Allegiance: Nazi Germany
- Branch: Waffen-SS
- Type: Shock troops
- Role: Maneuver warfare Raiding
- Size: Division
- Nickname: Italia
- Motto: Holy struggle of blood against gold - of work against capitalism - of spirit against matter
- Engagements: World War II; Italian Civil War; Operation Shingle; Bandenbekämpfung; Operation Kugelblitz; Operation Rösselsprung (1944); Battle of Garfagnana; Gothic Line; Operation Grapeshot

Commanders
- Notable commanders: Karl Wolff; Pietro Mannelli; Peter Hansen; Gustav Lombard; Constantin Heldmann; Erwin Tzschoppe

The 29th Waffen Grenadier Division of the SS (1st Italian) also Legione SS Italiana (German: 29. Waffen-Grenadier-Division der SS (italienische Nr. 1)) was an SS formation of Nazi Germany during World War II. It was originally created in the Italian Social Republic in 1943 as the Italian Legion, later becoming a brigade. The unit was upgraded to division status on 10 February 1945.

== Background ==
The Kingdom of Italy on 8 September 1943 signed an armistice with the Allies. In response, the German Army and the Waffen-SS disarmed Italian troops unless they were fighting for the German cause. The new Italian Social Republic was founded on 23 September 1943 under dictator Benito Mussolini. On 2 October 1943, Heinrich Himmler and Gottlob Berger devised the Programm zur Aufstellung der italienischen Milizeinheiten durch die Waffen-SS ("Program for the deployment of Italian militia forces by the Waffen-SS") which was approved by Adolf Hitler and Benito Mussolini.

== Operational history ==
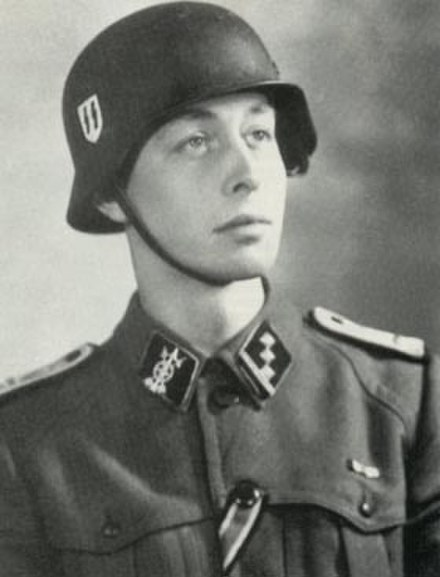
Pio Filippani Ronconi in the uniform of a foreign volunteer of the Waffen-SS. He is wearing the collar tabs of the 1st battalion of the "Waffen-Grenadier-Brigade der SS (italienische Nr. 1)."

In October 1943, 15,000 volunteers started training at Truppenübungsplatz Münsingen, but 9,000 of them were unsuitable and released for training in police units, the Black Brigades, or for labor.

On 23 November 1943, 13 Miliz-Battalions pledged their loyalty before being moved to SS-Ausbildungsstab Italien. The unit was commanded by SS-Obergruppenführer Karl Wolff and called Italienische SS-Freiwilligen-Legion, but soon renamed 1. Sturmbrigade Italienische Freiwilligen-Legion.

In April 1944, three battalions fought against Allied bridgeheads of Anzio and Nettuno with good results, for which Heinrich Himmler on 3 May 1944 allowed them to wear SS-Runes on black rather than red and be fully integrated into the Waffen SS. Members of the "Vendetta" under former Blackshirt Lieutenant-Colonel Degli Oddi particularly distinguished themselves in defeating a determined effort by the U.S. 3rd Infantry Division to overrun their positions and capturing a number of prisoners.

On 7 September 1944, it was renamed Waffen-Grenadier-Brigade der SS (italienische Nr. 1) under Generalkommando Lombardia of Army Group C. By December 1944, the unit comprised 15,000 men. In the spring of 1945, the division under the command of Ernst Tzschoppe as Kampfgruppe Binz fought against French units in Lombardy and the Partisans in Piedmont. On 30 April 1945, the division surrendered to US troops in Gorgonzola, Lombardy.

== Organization ==
Structure of the division:

- Headquarters
- 81st (1st Italian) SS Grenadier Regiment
- 82nd (2nd Italian) SS Grenadier Regiment
- 29th SS Fusiliers Battalion
- 29th SS Engineer Company
- 29th SS Artillery Regiment
- 29th SS Tank Destroyer Battalion
- 29th SS Signal Battalion
- 29th SS Divisional Supply Group

== Commanders ==
- March 1944 – September 1944: SS-Obergruppenführer Karl Wolff
- September 1944 – September 1944: SS-Brigadeführer Pietro Mannelli
- September 1944 – October 1944: SS-Brigadeführer Peter Hansen
- October 1944 – November 1944: SS-Brigadeführer Gustav Lombard
- November 1944 – February 1945: SS-Standartenführer Constantin Heldmann
- February 1945 – April 1945: SS-Oberführer Erwin Tzschoppe

== See also ==
- Waffen-SS foreign volunteers and conscripts
- Pio Filippani Ronconi
- List of German divisions in World War II
- List of Waffen-SS divisions
- List of SS personnel
