= Raj'a =

Return of a hidden Imam in Shia Islam

Rajʿa (Arabic: رجعة, lit. 'return'), also known as ḥashr khāṣṣ (lit. 'specific resurrection'), is a doctrine in Shia Islam positing that some of the dead will return to life before the Resurrection to avenge their oppression.

In Twelver Shia doctrine, the concept of rajʿa is closely intertwined with the eschatological concept of occultation (ghayba) and the reappearance of the Twelfth Imam Muhammad al-Mahdi in the end times to establish peace and justice on earth. This doctrine, which was elaborated in the early 10th century by the then emerging Twelver sect, goes back on earlier ideas developed by early Shia sects such as the late 7th-century Kaysāniyya and the early 9th-century Wāqifiyya, who denied the deaths of Muhammad ibn al-Hanafiyya (died 700) and Musa al-Kazim (died 799) and awaited their return. The doctrine was also current among the 8th/9th-century Shias known as ghulāt (lit. 'exaggerators'), whose elaboration of the idea may have influenced early Twelver scholars.

The concept was later also used in the Baháʼí Faith (19th century) to designate the cyclical return of the Manifestation of God, which appeared in prophet figures such Jesus or Muhammad, as well as in the Báb (1819–1850) and in Baháʼu'lláh (1817–1892), the two founders of the Baháʼí Faith.

== Occultation and rajʿa in Twelver Shia ==
Twelver Shias believe that their Twelfth Imam, Muhammad al-Mahdi, was concealed by God and continues to oversee human affairs and offer inward spiritual guidance during his occultation, which began in 874 CE.

While various sects disagree about the identity of the eschatological Mahdi, the belief in him remains popular among all Muslims, possibly owing to numerous traditions to this effect in canonical Sunni and Shia sources.

Shortly before the Day of Judgment, when commanded by God, Muhammad al-Mahdi will return to lead the forces of righteousness against the forces of evil in an apocalyptic war that would ultimately establish peace and justice on earth, according to the Twelvers. In his mission, al-Mahdi will be assisted by Jesus, who will pray behind al-Mahdi in his Second Coming. Jesus also kills al-Dajjal (antichrist) in some Sunni accounts, though that function is reserved for al-Mahdi in Twelver sources.

In Twelver thought, al-Mahdi is also expected to avenge the injustices suffered by Husayn, grandson of the prophet, whose innocent blood is believed to have plunged the Muslim community into a cycle of violence, corruption, and oppression. This vengeance is necessary, it is said, to rid the Muslim community of the most odious crime ever committed in their name. It also involves the return to life of the evildoers and their victims, which is known as the doctrine of rajʿa (lit. 'return'). The purpose of this return is for the oppressed to exact their revenge on their oppressors.

It is generally said that the prophet or the Imams will return to aid in the victory of al-Mahdi. In Shia traditions, particular emphasis is placed on the return of Husayn, who is expected to rule until old age upon his return. In some traditions, the rule of Husayn would be followed by that of Ali ibn Abi Talib, often referred to as ṣāḥib al-karrāt.

== Quran ==
In Twelver exegeses of the Quran, several verses have been associated with rajʿa, including Q2:259, Q17:6, Q24:55, Q27:83, Q28:5-6, and Q28:85. In particular, Q27:83 includes the passage, "On the day when We shall muster out of every nation a troop." Verse Q43:61 includes the sentence "He [Jesus] is surely a knowledge of the Hour," which has been connected to the descent of Jesus during the rulership of al-Mahdi and the imminence of the Day of Judgment after his descent. An analogy is often made with verse Q2:243, where God brought to life a group of the children of Israel.

== Earlier uses ==
Non-Twelver sects of Shia have used the term rajʿa to refer to the return of their imams from concealment, including the now-extinct sects of Kaysanite and Waqifite Shia, who denied the deaths of Muhammad ibn al-Hanafiyya (died 700) and Musa al-Kazim (died 799), respectively, and awaited their return. In Twelver Shia, however, the reemergence of the Hidden Imam is most commonly referred to as ẓuhūr (lit. 'appearance'). While often considered outside the pale of Islam, rajʿa has also been used by some of the ghulāt (lit. 'exaggerators') to refer to the passing of the soul into another body (metempsychosis, tanāsukh).

It has been argued that the conceptualization of rajʿa in 8th/9th-century ghulāt texts such as Mā yakūn ʿinda ẓuhūr al-Mahdī ('What Will Happen at the Appearance of the Mahdi') attributed to al-Mufaddal ibn Umar al-Ju'fi (died before 799) has influenced the early 10th-century development of the Twelver Shi'i doctrine on the return of the Twelfth and Hidden Imam Muhammad al-Mahdi.

== Baháʼí Faith ==
The concept of periodic return of a Manifestation of God is central to prophetology of the Baháʼí Faith, which originated in the 19th century. Baháʼís do not view the return of the prophets and saints of the past as a physical return, or resurrection, but rather a return of spiritual characteristics and archetypal roles. This was developed in a milieu of Shiʽa eschatology, initially by Shaykh Ahmad (1753–1826), considered by Baháʼís to be an inspired predecessor to their own faith. The return of the attributes of God in an individual are expected about every thousand years, and these people are termed Manifestations of God. Jesus and Muhammad are regarded as such, as well as Báb (1819–1850) and Baháʼu'lláh (1817–1892), the two founders of the Baháʼí Faith. Each prophet is described by Baháʼu'lláh as in a sense the return of every previous prophet. The concept of return is further extended to the companions of the Manifestations of God. For example, Aaron, Saint Peter, Ali, and Quddús are all considered equivalent minor prophets that championed and spread the cause of the major prophet.

== See also ==
- Last Judgment
- Occultation (Islam), Shi'ite eschatological belief in the concealment and subsequent reemergence of an Imam or Mahdi, who will establish justice and peace on earth in the end of time
  - Minor Occultation, first period of concealment of the Imam (874–941) in Twelver Shi'ism, during which the Hidden Imam Muhammad al-Mahdi is believed to have communicated regularly with his followers through four successive agents
  - Major Occultation, second period of concealment of the Imam (941–present) in Twelver Shi'ism, during which the Hidden Imam is believed to be without agent
    - Kitab al-Ghayba (al-Nu'mani), a work on the occultation of the Imam by the Twelver Shi'ite scholar Muhammad ibn Ibrahim al-Nu'mani (died c. 970)
    - Kitab al-Ghayba (al-Tusi), a work on the occultation of the Imam by the Twelver Shi'ite scholar Shaykh Tusi (995–1067)
- Resurrection of the dead
- Second coming

== Sources ==
- Amir-Moezzi, Mohammad Ali (1998). "Eschatology iii. Imami Shiʿism". Encyclopædia Iranica. Vol. VIII/6. pp. 575–581.
- Amir-Moezzi, Mohammad Ali (2007–2012). "Islam in Iran vii. The Concept of Mahdi in Twelver Shiʿism". In Yarshater, Ehsan (ed.). Encyclopædia Iranica.
- Kohlberg, Etan (1976). "From Imāmiyya to Ithnā-ʿAshariyya". Bulletin of the School of Oriental and African Studies. 39 (3): 521–534. doi:10.1017/S0041977X00050989. JSTOR 614712. S2CID 155070530.
- Kohlberg, Etan (1960–2007). "Radjʿa". In Bearman, P. (ed.). Encyclopaedia of Islam (Second ed.). Brill Reference Online. doi:10.1163/1573-3912_islam_COM_0898.
- Madelung, Wilferd (1960–2007). "al-Mahdī". In Bearman, P. (ed.). Encyclopaedia of Islam (Second ed.). Brill Reference Online. doi:10.1163/1573-3912_islam_COM_0618.
- Momen, Moojan (1985). An Introduction to Shi'i Islam. Yale University Press. ISBN 9780300034998.
- Moojan, Momen (1995). "Baha'u'llah's prophetology: Archetypal patterns in the lives of the founders of the world religions". Baháʼí Studies Review. 5.
- Sachedina, Abdulaziz Abdulhussein (1981). Islamic Messianism: The Idea of Mahdī in Twelver Shīʻism. Suny press. ISBN 978-0873954426.
- Tabatabai, Sayyid Mohammad Hosayn (1975). Shi'ite Islam. Translated by Sayyid Hossein Nasr. State University of New York Press. ISBN 0-87395-390-8.
- Turner, Colin P. (2006). "The "Tradition of Mufaḍḍal" and the Doctrine of the Rajʿa: Evidence of Ghuluww in the Eschatology of Twelver Shiʿism?". Iran. 44: 175–195. doi:10.1080/05786967.2006.11834685. JSTOR 4300708. S2CID 170603436.
