= The Quran of Historians =

2019 history book

- Editor: Mohammad Ali Amir-Moezzi and Guillaume Dye
- Original title: French: Le Coran des historiens
- Language: French
- Subject: Quran
- Genre: summa
- Published: 2019
- Publisher: éditions du Cerf

The Quran of Historians (French: Le Coran des historiens) is a work of research and historical synthesis on Islam, specifically focusing on the Quran. It was published in three volumes in 2019 by éditions du Cerf after five years of work. The book was described as a "summa" of current knowledge on the history of Islam by several researchers. It is the first commentary on the entire Quran published in the field of Quranic studies in French.

The writing was entrusted to researchers but was directed by Mohammad Ali Amir-Moezzi and Guillaume Dye. The book includes contributions from twenty-eight researchers.

== Authors ==
In addition to Mohammad Ali Amir-Moezzi and Guillaume Dye, the work has contributions from twenty-six other researchers, including Muriel Debié, Mehdi Azaiez, Samra Azarnouche, and François Déroche.

== Work ==
According to the authors, the project aims to "deal with the 'Quran as a text' based exclusively on historical and philological research that lies outside the realm of belief."

The work is presented as a review and synthesis of various hypotheses and historical discoveries related to the birth of Islam, the birth of the Quran, its development, its contextual and textual history, the major issues surrounding this text, its writing, propagation, and its canonization into a unique text.

=== Structure ===
Its encyclopedic and comprehensive nature leads some scholars to describe it as a "summa."

The first volume, consisting of 1016 pages in French, addresses historical and methodological questions. The second volume provides a translation and running commentary on the Quranic text, while the third is dedicated to the bibliography and sources used. The total length of all three volumes exceeds 3500 pages.

=== Translations ===
An Arabic translation is currently underway.

== Reception ==
=== Scholarly reception ===
Shortly after its publication, the work was regarded by various researchers as a "landmark" or as an important contribution to Islamic research. Gavin McDowell of Laval University described the book as follows:

Le Coran des historiens is a monumental work of Proustian dimensions. Billed as a "a summary (or perhaps: summa) without precedent in history" and also "an unedited adventure of the spirit," whatever that might mean, this dense work does have a legitimate claim to be the first of its kind.

According to Muhammad Bā'azam, it is the only work of such magnitude that exists. The University Platform for Research on Islam (PLURIEL) promoted the book and provided an opportunity to organize research seminars and introductory seminars at Aix-Marseille University. UNESCO and the University of Kufa also organized a conference on the book, as did the French Institute of Islamic Cultures.

=== Islamic reception ===
The Iranian Ahl al-Bayt International University, recommended reading the book and organized a research seminar focused on it in 2022. The Quran of Historians was cited in the latest work of Muhammad Shahrur. Hisham Abdel Gawad considered this publication as "another step towards popularizing the historical-critical approach among the general public, including the Muslim audience."

The Arabic-speaking website Ahewar highlighted its publication and provided positive commentary. According to Syrian philosopher Hashim Saleh, it is the "most important book of the 21st century." However, an Iranian Shiite preacher criticized the work, accusing it of being part of a Western conspiracy to destroy Islam. In contrast, a Moroccan writer accused the book of being a Shia propaganda directed against Sunni Islam.

=== Media coverage ===
Radio France featured the book in a program with Mohammad Ali Amir-Moezzi and in a series of episodes dedicated to the subject. Another program on France Culture invited him along with Muriel Debié and Guillaume Dye.

Le Monde devoted a laudatory article to the book. While Le Figaro, a conservative French newspaper, and Libération, a socialist French newspaper, had written articles about the publication of The Quran of Historians, Riposte Laïque!, a far-right French website, accused the book of being an "apology for Islam."

=== Sales and awards ===
The book was a commercial success in France, selling 12,000 copies in its first six months. It received the Grand Prize from the Institut du Monde Arabe in 2020.

=== Others ===
The Roshan Cultural Heritage Institute congratulated Mohammad Ali Amir-Moezzi for the publication of this book.
