= Muriel Debié =

French historian specialist of the Syriac world

- Born: December 28, 1967 (age 58); Pau, France
- Awards: Knight of the Ordre national du Mérite

Academic background
- Education: Catholic University of Paris; Sorbonne

Academic work
- Discipline: history
- Institutions: École pratique des hautes études
- Main interests: Syriac Christianity
- Website: https://ephe.academia.edu/murieldebie

Muriel Debié, born in 1967, is a French historian specialist of the Syriac world.

== Biography ==
Muriel Debié was born in Pau on December 28, 1967. After studying at Henri-IV and then at the École normale supérieure, she pursued a path as an orientalist at the Catholic University of Paris and later at the Sorbonne (Paris IV), where she completed a thesis under the supervision of Bernard Flusin on Western Syriac historiography.

She teaches as a director of studies at the École pratique des hautes études (EPHE), where she holds the chair of Oriental Christianities. One of her research topics focuses on the complex relationships between Christians and Muslims in the early Muslim caliphates. Additionally, Muriel Debié contributed to France Culture, addressing topics related to her research, such as Ephrem the Syrian, the city of Antioch or the figure of Jacob of Serugh, among others.

She is generally regarded, along with her colleague Françoise Briquel-Chatonnet, as a significant Syriac scholar. The two researchers also collaborated within the framework of Les Belles Lettres, where they oversaw the publication of a new collection dedicated to Oriental Christianity. Their joint work, "Le monde syriaque" (The Syriac World), received a major award from the Institut du monde arabe in 2018 and the medievalist prize la Dame à la licorne.

The following year, in 2019, Debié contributed to the writing of The Quran of Historians and later joined the Institut Universitaire de France as a senior member in 2020.

In November 2022, she was appointed a Knight of the Ordre national du Mérite for her academic research. For her book Alexandre le Grand en syriaque: Maître des lieux, des savoirs et des temps (Les Belles Lettres, 2024), Debié was a joint winner of the 2025 Podmore Book Prize for Late Antiquity, awarded by an independent international judging panel on behalf of the Virtual Centre for Late Antiquity.

== Decorations ==
- Knight of the Ordre national du Mérite
