= Pio Filippani Ronconi =

Italian SS officer

Pio Alessandro Carlo Fulvio Filippani Ronconi
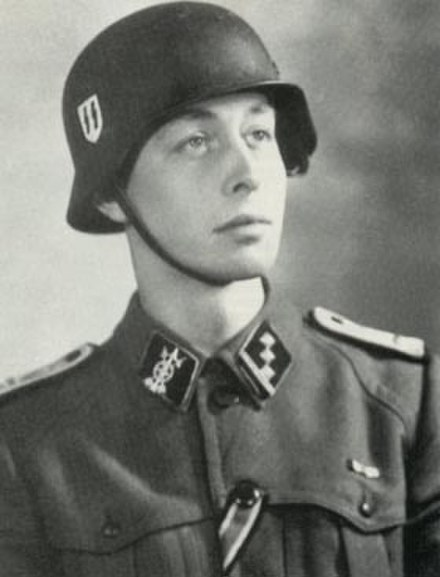
- Ronconi in 1943
- Born: 10 March 1920; Madrid, Spanish Empire
- Died: 11 February 2010 (aged 89); Rome, Italy
- Military career
- Allegiance: Kingdom of Italy; Italian Social Republic
- Branch: Royal Italian Army; Waffen-SS
- Service years: 1940–1945
- Rank: Obersturmführer
- Units: 1st Battalion, 29th Waffen Grenadier Division of the SS (1st Italian)
- Conflicts: World War II: Italian Civil War; Battle of Anzio
- Awards: Iron Cross Second Class

Pio Alessandro Carlo Fulvio Filippani Ronconi (10 March 1920 – 11 February 2010) was an Italian orientalist, Waffen-SS soldier and author. He was born in Madrid, Spain, and died in Rome.

== Biography ==
He was born out of a black aristocratic family, his father being Count Fulvio Filippani Ronconi and his mother Anita Tamagno, tracing back to the Roman patriciate. He grew up in Spain until the Civil War, when his mother was shot by Republicans after which he and his family returned to Italy. By this period he was competent in Italian, Spanish, Catalan, Arabic, Greek and Latin, and later studied several additional languages including Turkish, Hebrew, Chinese, Tibetan, Sanskrit and Persian among others. Due to his wide command of languages, he worked for the Italian radio company EIAR as a foreign news reader.

At the same time, his spiritual interests brought him to study and practice the tantras, and to know Julius Evola, Arturo Reghini and other members of the Ur Group. He thoroughly studied tantrism and gnosticism, in different cultural contexts, as well as the faiths and rituals of ancient Italy, from the Iguvine Tablets to Ancient Roman religion.

When Italy entered World War II (10 June 1940), he enlisted as a volunteer, fighting in Libya. He was wounded twice and he was decorated for his valour. After the fall of Benito Mussolini and the creation of the Italian Social Republic, he enlisted in the Italian SS-Legion, later reorganized as the 29th Division of the Waffen-SS "Italia" reaching the rank of Obersturmführer. He fought at Nettuno, receiving the Second-Class Iron Cross during the battle. He was probably the last surviving member of the Bataillon "Degli Oddi".

After the end of the war he continued his studies, getting to know Massimo Scaligero personally and through him the works of Rudolf Steiner. He then elaborated his own conception of anthroposophy, cleansed of its Christian aspects and focused on the ancient Indo-European paganism. In 1959 he became a key pupil of Giuseppe Tucci, the most important Italian orientalist at the time. He taught both at the University of Naples "L'Orientale" and at the School of Orientalistics in Venice.

During the same period, he continued working for the Italian government. He was officially employed at the foreign radio office of the Prime Minister of Italy and also worked for the Italian intelligence services as translator. During the early 1950s he was sent to Persia to gather political and military information in the area. He collaborated with several Latin American intelligence services: in 1950, he had written a report about the political and military situation of Bolivia, foreseeing a revolution which broke out several months later. He continued working for Italian intelligence until the 1970s. He also worked with the Italian Ministry of Defence, as cryptographer and translator of oriental languages.

In 1965, he was one of the lecturers at a conference about revolutionary war held at the Hotel "Parco dei Principi" in Rome, which was organized by Fascist politician Pino Rauti and his Ordine Nuovo organization. He was later questioned by the court about the Piazza Fontana bombing. As his lecture was thought to have been devised and used to plan a general "strategy of tension" to destabilize Italian democratic system, and due to one of his students, Delfo Zorzi, being enquired for material responsibility. However inquiries proved that he was not involved in any way.

In 2000, he entered a collaboration with the national newspaper Corriere della Sera, writing articles about Eastern philosophy, but he was dismissed from the newspaper, after a reader denounced him as serving in the Waffen-SS during World War Two. At some point before his death in 2010, he converted to Eastern Orthodoxy, and his funeral was conducted in accordance with the Russian Orthodox rite.

== Works ==
=== Books ===
- Avviamento allo studio del pensiero orientale, Naples, Pironti, 1959 (2 vol.).
- Storia del pensiero cinese, Turin, 1964 (new edition: Bollati Boringhieri, 1992).
- Ismaeliti ed Assassini, Basilea, Thoth, 1973 (new edition: Rimini, Il Cerchio, 2004, ISBN 88-8474-059-2).
- Le vie del Buddhismo, Rome, Basaia, 1986 (new edition: Genoa, ECIG, 1988, ISBN 88-7545-905-3).
- Vak. La parola primordiale. Quattro saggi sui Tantra, Marina di Patti, 1988.
- Magia, religioni e miti dell'India, Rome, Casa del Libro, 1989.
- Miti e religioni dell'India, Rome, Newton Compton, 1992.
- Il buddhismo, storia e dottrina, Rome, 1994 (new edition: Rome, Newton Compton, 2004).
- Buddha: aforismi e discorsi, Rome, Tascabili Newton, 1994.
- L'induismo, Rome, Tascabili Newton, 1994.
- Zarathustra e il Mazdeismo, Rome, Edizioni Irradiazioni, 2007.
- Un altro Islam. Mistica, metafisica e cosmologia, Rome, Edizioni Irradiazioni, 2012.

=== Translations and editions ===
- Nasir-e Hosraw, Il libro dello scioglimento e della liberazione, Naples, Istituto Universitario Orientale, 1959.
- Sa'dî, Il roseto, Turin, Boringhieri, 1965.
- Ummu'l-Kitab, Naples, Istituto Universitario Orientale, 1966.
- Canone buddhista: discorsi brevi, Turin, UTET, 1968.
- Julius Evola, Lo Yoga della Potenza. Saggio sui Tantra (introduction), Rome, Edizioni Mediterranee, 1968–1994.
- Upanisad antiche e medie, Turin, 1968 (new edition: Turin, Bollati Boringhieri, 2007 ISBN 978-88-339-1797-9).
- Canone buddista: così è stato detto (Itivuttaka), Milano, 1995.
- Buddha, La via per la saggezza. Dhamma-Pada e discorsi, Rome, Newton Compton, 2006.

=== Articles ===
- "Note sulla costruzione del mandala con riferimento al primo capitolo del Guhyasamayantra", in: AION, Naples, 1959.
- "La cosmologia arcana degli Ismaeliti", in: Vie della Tradizione, n. 7, luglio-settembre 1972.
- "Aspetti della teoria della parola nello Sivaismo del Kasmir", in: Vie della Tradizione, n. 25, gennaio-marzo 1977.
- "Le cinque vie per il cuore secondo lo Scivaismo del Kashmir", in: Vie della Tradizione, n. 29, gennaio-marzo 1978.
- "Il mezzo di Sciva (çâmbhavôpâya) e le vie al vuoto", in: Vie della Tradizione, n. 30, aprile-giugno 1978.
- "Significato e valore del pensiero indiano per l'occidente", in: Vie della Tradizione, n. 31, luglio-settembre 1978.
- "I Siddha ed i sistemi del cuore", in: Vie della Tradizione, n. 32, ottobre-dicembre 1978.
- "Orientamenti della medicina tradizionale indiana", in: Vie della Tradizione, n. 35, luglio-settembre 1979.
- "Psicologia fondamentale dello Shamanesimo in Asia ed in America", in: Vie della Tradizione, n. 36, ottobre-dicembre 1979.
- "Motivi regali dall'Iran all'occidente" (first part), in: Vie della Tradizione, n. 37, gennaio-marzo 1980.
- "Motivi regali dall'Iran all'occidente" (second part), in: Vie della Tradizione, n. 38, aprile-giugno1980.
- "Diversi orizzonti per una ricerca culturale", in: Vie della Tradizione, n. 40, ottobre-dicembre 1980.
- "Tradizione e tradizionalismi. Le non-vie degli incapaci", in: Solstitium, anno VIII, n. 1, marzo 1983.
- "I Tantra Antropologia e cosmologia" (first part), in: Vie della Tradizione, n. 52, ottobre-dicembre 1983.
- "I Tantra Antropologia e cosmologia" (second part), in: Vie della Tradizione, n. 53, gennaio-marzo 1984.
- "Il quadruplice vuoto e la Mahâmudrâ secondo il Sahajayâna" (first part), in: Graal, anno IV, n. 13–14, 1987.
- "Il quadruplice vuoto e la Mahâmudrâ secondo il Sahajayâna" (second part), in: Graal, anno IX, n. 36, 1991.
- "L'Isola Iniziatica", in: Graal, anno IX, n. 36, 1991.
- "Un tempo, un destino. Il fato singolare del barone-generale Román Fiodórovic von Unger-Sternberg", in: Vie della Tradizione, n. 29, aprile-giugno 1991.
- "Le vie dei Tantra" (first part), in: Vie della Tradizione, n. 83, luglio-settembre 1991.
- "Le vie dei Tantra" (second part), in: Vie della Tradizione, n. 84, ottobre-dicembre 1991.
- "Memorie religiose di Roma", in Futuro presente, n. 3, autunno 1993.
- "La coscienza-deposito (Alaya-Vijnana) quale fondamento epistemologico della realtà", in: Vie della Tradizione, n. 94, aprile-giugno 1994.
- "Appunti sull'arte regia: concentrazione, meditazione, contemplazione", in: Mos Maiorum, n. 3, dicembre 1994.
- "L'esilio occidentale e il ritrovamento della luce. Variazioni sul tema dell'Isola Iniziatica", in: Mos Maiorum, n. 4, marzo 1995.
- "La metafisica del sacro. Il fuoco vedico", in: Mos Maiorum, anno II, aprile 1995.
- "Valore della Speculazione Indiana Tradizionale per il Moderno Occidente", in Heliodromos, n. 8, autunno 1995.
- "La concezione sacrale della Terra in Asia in particolare in India e Iran", in: Vie della Tradizione, n. 107, luglio-settembre 1997.
- "La immaginazione quale poiesis del sacro nella meditazione filosofica indiana e nella gnosi islamica", in: Letteratura-Tradizione, n. 3, marzo-maggio 1998.
- "Le radici storiche e culturali dell'arditismo", in: Letteratura-Tradizione, n. 4, giugno-agosto 1998.
- "Orientamenti epistemologici della medicina indiana", in: Letteratura-Tradizione, n. 5, gennaio 1999.
- "Mondo simbolico e mondo reale", in: Letteratura-Tradizione, n. 6, aprile 1999.
- "La tipologia del guerriero", in: Letteratura-Tradizione, n. 7, luglio 1999.
- "Psicologia e metafisica della guerra d'ogni tempo", in: Letteratura-Tradizione, n. 7, luglio 1999.
- "L'esperienza "gnostica" del pensiero orientale", in: Letteratura-Tradizione, n. 9, gennaio 2000.
- "L'assurdo come doppia dimensione del reale in Franz Kafka", in: Letteratura-Tradizione, n. 10, primavera 2000.
- "La 29ª divisione granatieri SS", in: Arthos, Genoa, n. 7–8, gennaio-dicembre 2000.
- "Massimo Scaligero Amico e Maestro", in L'Archetipo, anno VI, n. 3, gennaio 2001.
- "Julius Evola: per una impersonalità attiva", in: Julius Evola un pensiero per la fine del millennio, 2001.
- "Agni-Ignis. Metafisica del Fuoco Sacro", in La Cittadella, anno I, n. 4, ottobre-dicembre 2001.
- "L'oro, la moneta, la ricchezza", in: Letteratura-Tradizione, n. 20, primavera 2002.
- "I consigli per la vita militare di Pio Filippani-Ronconi", in La Cittadella, anno II, n. 8, ottobre-dicembre 2002.
- "In 7 punti: l'oro, la moneta, la ricchezza", in: L'Archetipo, anno VIII, n. 6, giugno 2003.
- "Le radici storiche e culturali dell'arditismo", in La Cittadella, anno V, n. 17, gennaio-marzo 2005.
- "Il barone Román Fiodórovic von Ungern-Sternberg", in: Letteratura-Tradizione, anno II, n. 9, gennaio 2007.
- "I molteplici stati di coscienza nello Yoga e nello sciamanesimo", in: Simmetria, n. 3, ottobre 2010.

== Bibliography ==
- Guerra, Nicola (2012). I volontari italiani nelle Waffen-SS. Il pensiero politico, la formazione culturale e le motivazioni al volontariato (in Italian). Turku: Annales Universitatis Turkuensis. ISBN 978-951-29-5221-2.
- Iacovella, Angelo (2011). L'Orientalista Guerriero. Omaggio a Pio Filippani-Ronconi (in Italian). Rimini: Il Cerchio. ISBN 978-888-47-4298-8.
- Piscitelli, Alfonso (2006). Esoterismo e Fascismo: Suggestioni esoteriche nelle SS italiane (in Italian). Rome: Edizioni Mediterranee. ISBN 88-272-1831-9.
- VV.AA. (2010). La Cittadella. Omaggio a Pio Filippani-Ronconi. Quaderni di studi storici e tradizionali romano-italici (in Italian). Rome: I Libri del Graal.
