= Casa del Libro =

Spanish bookstore chain

- Formerly: El Palacio del Libro
- Type: Subsidiary
- Industry: Retail (Bookselling)
- Founded: April 15, 1923; 103 years ago
- Founder: Editorial Calpe
- Headquarters: Madrid, Spain
- Number of locations: 77 (2026)
- Area served: Spain
- Key people: Javier Arrevola (general director)
- Products: Books, e-books
- Parent: Grupo Planeta (since 1992)
- Website: www.casadellibro.com

Casa del Libro (Spanish for "House of the Book") is a Spanish bookstore chain owned by Grupo Planeta. Founded in Madrid in 1923, it is the largest bookstore chain in Spain, operating 77 stores in Spain as well as an online store. Its original store on the Gran Vía remains the chain's flagship and is considered a landmark of the city.

== History ==
The bookstore was created by the publishing house Calpe, which was directed by Nicolás María de Urgoiti and wanted a retail outlet of its own. In 1919 Calpe acquired a plot on Gran Vía. The architect José Yarnoz Larrosa designed a building there for both the company's offices and a shop, and it was built between 1920 and 1923. The shop opened on April 15, 1923 under the name El Palacio del Libro and was renamed Casa del Libro later that year. It was one of the first bookstores in Spain where customers could browse and handle books themselves instead of asking for them at a counter. In 1925 Calpe merged with Espasa to form Espasa-Calpe. The store was occupied during the Spanish Civil War and reopened after the conflict.

Grupo Planeta acquired Casa del Libro in 1992. In 1996 it launched one of the first e-commerce websites selling books in Spanish. In 1999 the chain still had only four bookstores, but began a national expansion. It opened large stores in the city centers and smaller ones in shopping centers.

In 2011, it bought the nine Spanish stores of the Bertrand chain and rebranded them. Javier Arrevola became general director in 2018. That December the Gran Vía flagship reopened after a ten-month renovation. Since then the chain has opened stores in cities including Palma de Mallorca, Santander, Granada, A Coruña, Pamplona, Seville, Lleida and Lugo.

== Centenary and recognition ==
Casa del Libro marked its centenary in 2023. On March 30, 2023, King Felipe VI and Queen Letizia presided over a commemorative event at the Círculo de Bellas Artes in Madrid, attended by around 40 writers and figures from cultural and political life. Espasa published the commemorative book Casa del Libro. 100 años the next day. From May to June a retrospective exhibition ran at the Eugenio Trías Library in El Retiro, timed to coincide with the Madrid Book Fair.

In 2023, The Madrid City Council awarded the company the Madrid Medal. The same year the Federation of Publishers' Guilds of Spain gave the Gran Vía store the Boixareu Ginesta Bookseller of the Year award at the LIBER fair. In later years the chain also won several Spanish e-commerce and retail awards, including recognition from Adigital's Ecommerce Awards in 2025 and 2026.
