= Albrecht Noth =

German historian of Islam (1937–1999)

Albrecht Noth (23 September 1937 – 22 February 1999) was a German historian of Islam.

== Biography ==
Noth was born on 23 September 1937 to the Old Testament scholar Martin Noth in Königsberg. He completed his PhD from the Bonn University in 1964 with a thesis titled Heiliger Krieg und heiliger Kampf in Islam und Christentum: Beiträge zur Vorgeschichte und Geschichte der Kreuzzüge. His 1973 work on Islamic historiography questioned the usefulness of the Islamic narrative sources in reconstructing the early history of Islam, stressing that the sources are collections of literary topoi having little to do with actual historical events. The work sparked a trend of strong criticism of the medieval sources, which ultimately gave rise to the revisionist camp of scholars in the field of Islamic studies.

== Works ==
- Noth, Albrecht (1973). Quellenkritische Studien zu Themen, Formen und Tendenzen frühislamischer Geschichtsuberlieferung. Bonn: Selbstverlag des Orientalischen Seminars der Universität Bonn
- Noth, Albrecht; Conard, Lawrence; Bonner, Michael (trans.) (1994). The Early Arabic Historical Tradition. A Source-Critical Study. Princeton: The Darwin Press
