= Mohammad Ali Amir-Moezzi =

French-Iranian Islamologist (1956–present)

- Born: 1956 (age 69–70); Teheran, Iran
- Known for: Historian of Islam
- Notable work: The Divine Guide in Early Shi‘ism

Mohammad Ali Amir-Moezzi is an Islamologist at the École pratique des Hautes Études. He is one of the leading academics within the study of early Twelver Shiʿism.

== Views on Early Shi'ism ==
=== Early Shi'is held supra-natural beliefs about the Imams ===
One of Amir-Moezzi's fundamental arguments is that the supra-natural and supra-rational beliefs about the Twelve Imams were the core of Twelver Shiʿism. This puts him in conflict with the prevailing interpretation that it was the rational tradition, led by figures such as Al-Shaykh Al-Mufid, that constituted this core. This argument was initially put forward in Le guide divin dans le Shiisme original (The Divine Guide in Early Shi‘ism), and continued to be developed in his later work. This view is generally contrasted with the views of Hossein Modarressi. Amir-Moezzi describes this early Shiʿi view as such:

Without the Imam, the universe would crumble, since he is the Proof, the Manifestation, and the Organ of God, and he is the Means by which human beings can attain, if not knowledge of God, at least what is knowable in God. Without the Perfect Man, without a Sacred Guide, there is no access to the divine, and the world could only be engulfed in darkness. The Imam is the Threshold through which God and the creatures communicate. He is thus a cosmic necessity, the key and the center of the universal economy of the sacred: "The earth cannot be devoid of an imam; without him, it could not last an hour."

=== ʿAql as Hiero-Intelligence not Rationality ===
In order to offer a new understanding of early Shiʿi viewpoints, Amir-Moezzi's begins by reconstructing the concept of rationality. The standard understanding considers Imami thought as being a rational theology similar to the Muʿtazila. Amir-Moezzi argues that this assumption distorts the understanding of the early Shiʿi narrations, especially the narrations on ʿaql, which is often translated as reason. The narrations state that the ʿaql is the means through which the doctrine of the Imams is understood. However, ʿaql was equated with rationality later on due to the influence of Greek philosophy, but in the early sources ʿaql was rather what he labels as "hiero-intelligence." This "hiero-intelligence" has four dimensions: cosmogonic, ethical-epistemological, spiritual, and soteriological. The cosmogonic dimension is that the ʿaql proceeded "from the God's Light, was the first of God's creations; it is characterized by its submission and its will to be near God." The epistemological dimension is that the ʿaql "is not just an acquired quality, but a gift from God." The spiritual dimension is that ʿaql is the "inner proof" and while the Imams are the "exterior proof." The soteriological dimension means that "the absence of ʿaql, the 'organ' of religion, there can only be false religiousness, an appearance of piety, hypocrisy."

== Distinctions ==
- 2020: Grand Prize of the Institut du Monde Arabe (France)
- 2019: Prize Pierre-Antoine Bernheim of the Académie des Inscriptions et Belles-Lettres (France)
- 2016: Prize of the Fondazione Carical (Italy)
- 2011: Award of Islamology (New York)
- 2008: Prize Lequeux of the Institut de France
- 1992: Award of the Foundation Mahvi (Geneva)

== Honours ==
- 2022 : Knight of the Legion of Honour
- 2015 : Officer of the Ordre des Palmes académiques
- 2002 : Knight of the Ordre des Palmes académiques

== Publications ==
Most of Amir-Moezzi's publications are in French, but some have been translated to English and Italian.

=== English ===
- The Divine Guide in Early Shi‘ism, translated by David Streight (Albany: State University of New York Press, 1994)
- Revelation and Falsification: The Kitāb Al-Qirāʼāt of Aḥmad b. Muḥammad Al-Sayyārī, edited by Mohammad Ali Amir-Moezzi and Etan Kohlberg (Leiden ; Boston: Brill, 2009)
- The Silent Qu'ran and the Speaking Qur'an, translated by Eric Ormsby (New York: Columbia University Press, 2016)

=== French ===
- Le Guide divin dans le shi’isme originel. Aux sources de l’ésotérisme en Islam, Paris, ed. Verdier, coll. « Islam Spirituel », Paris, 1992
- Qu’est-ce que le shî’isme ? (with Christian Jambet), Paris, ed. Fayard, coll. « Histoire de la pensée », Paris, 2004
- La Religion discrète : croyances et pratiques spirituelles dans l'islam shi’ite, Paris, ed. Vrin, coll. « Textes et Traditions », Paris, 2006
- Petite histoire de l’islam (with Pierre Lory) Paris, ed. Flammarion, coll. « Librio », Paris, 2007
- Dictionnaire du Coran (ed. Mohammad Ali Amir-Moezzi), Paris, ed. Robert Laffont, coll. « Bouquins », 200712.
- Le Coran silencieux et le Coran parlant. Sources scripturaires de l'islam entre histoire et ferveur, CNRS Éditions, Paris, 2011
- La Preuve de Dieu. La mystique shi’ite à travers l’œuvre de Kulayni, IXe – Xe siècle, ed. du Cerf, coll. « Islam, nouvelle approche », 348 p., Paris, 2018
- Le Coran des historiens (ed. Mohammad Ali Amir-Moezzi & Guillaume Dye), 3 vols, Paris, Éditions du Cerf, 2019
- Ali, le secret bien gardé. Figures du premier Maître en spiritualité shi’ite, CNRS Éditions, Paris, 2020
- with John V. Tolan, Le Mahomet des historiens, Les Éditions du Cerf 2025.

=== Italian ===
- (I. Zilio Grandi ed.), Dizionario del Corano, Milano: Mondadori, 2007
- Il Corano (eds. A. Ventura; trans. I. Zilio-Grandi; comments A. Ventura; M. Yahia, I. Zilio-Grandi, and M. A. Amir-Moezzi), Milano: Mondadori, 2010
- Il Corano silente, il Corano parlante - Le fonti scritturali dell'Islam fra storia e fervore (Roma: Istituto per l'Oriente Carlo Alfonso Nallino, 2018)
