= Ali and Islamic sciences =

Ali ibn Abi Talib, the cousin and son-in-law of the Islamic prophet Muhammad, played a pivotal role in the formative early years of Islam. Later, after the death of Muhammad in 632 CE, through his numerous sayings and writings, Ali helped establish a range of Islamic sciences, including Quranic exegesis, theology, jurisprudence, rhetoric (balagha), and Arabic grammar. He also trained disciples who later excelled in gnostics, exegesis, theology, and jurisprudence. Numerous traditions, attributed to Ali, elucidate the esoteric teachings of the Quran, the central religious text in Islam. As the first Shia imam, he is also regarded in Shia Islam as the interpreter, par excellence, of the Quran after the death of Muhammad. Ali is considered a reliable and prolific narrator of prophetic traditions, while his own statements and practices are further studied in Shia Islam as the continuation of prophetic teachings. Ali is also viewed as the founder of Islamic theology. Some contributions of Ali to Islamic sciences are highlighted below.

== Quranic sciences ==
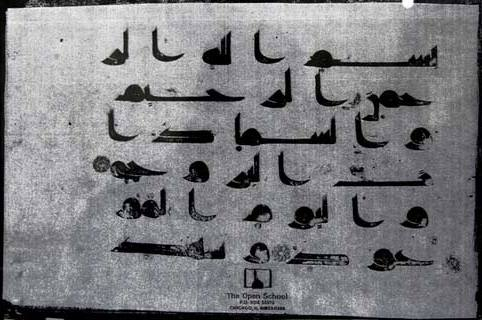
The first three verses of the Surah al-buruj (85:1–3) in what might be a folio from the Mushaf of Ali, preserved in the library of the Imam Ali shrine, Najaf, Iraq

After the death of the Islamic prophet Muhammad in 632 CE, his cousin and son-in-law Ali ibn Abi Talib played a distinct role in the genesis of Quranic sciences. His profound knowledge of the Quran, the central religious text of Islam, is often attested in early Sunni and Shia sources. Among such statements is a prophetic tradition in Sahih al-Bukhari, a canonical Sunni source, to the effect that Ali possessed both the inner and outer dimensions of the Quran. Another such prophetic tradition reads, "Ali is with the Quran and the Quran is with Ali."

The Sunni scholar Ibn Kathir (d. 1373) ascribes to Muhammad, "Wisdom is divided into ten parts: Nine parts are given to Ali and one part is distributed among the rest of the people." Muhammad is also said to have predicted that, just as he fought for the revelation (tanzil) of the Quran, Ali would fight for the esoteric interpretation (ta'wil) of the Quran. A similar statement about his fighting for the ta'wil of the Quran is attributed to Ali himself.

Ali also claimed to have learned the cause of revelation and the esoteric interpretation of every verse of the Quran directly from Muhammad. He also referred to himself as the 'speaking Quran', and Shia Muslims indeed regard Ali as the interpreter, par excellence, of the Quran after the death of Muhammad, alongside the remaining Shia imams from his progeny.

The current standard recitation of the Quran has been traced back to Ali, through his disciple Abu al-Aswad al-Du'ali (d. 688–689). Also attributed to Ali is a non-extant recension of the Quran, known as Mushaf of Ali, which is thought to have also included his authoritative commentary. Ibn Abbas (d. c. 687) and Ibn Mas'ud (d. c. 653), two leading early exegetes, studied under Ali. Indeed, Ibn Abbas credited Ali with his interpretations of the Quran, while Ibn Mas'ud is reported to have said that Ali possessed both the inner and outer dimensions of the Quran.

The written legacy of Ali is also dotted with Quranic commentaries, for instance, the exegesis of verse 24:37 in sermon 213 of Nahj al-balagha, a collection of sermons, letters, and sayings attributed to Ali. He is credited with laying the foundations for the exegesis (tafsir) of the Quran by the Quran, a method of interpreting the Quran by its own verses. In this vein, it is ascribed to Ali, "Parts of it [the Quran] speak through other parts, and some parts of it bear witness to other parts."

Ali taught that the Quran has multiple meanings and facets (wujuh). He also did not view the divine revelation as a replacement for the human intellect. By contrast, in the first sermon of Nahj al-balagha, he describes the purpose of revelation as "unearthing" the "buried treasures of intellect." He thus saw revelation and intellect as complementing each other.

Numerous traditions have been transmitted from Ali about the Quran, on such topics as abrogating and abrogated verses and occasions of revelation. Some of these were compiled in Tafsir al-Nu'mani by the tenth-century Shia scholar Muhammad ibn Ibrahim al-Nu'mani.

== Hadith literature and sciences ==
As a close companion of the Islamic prophet, Ali has related numerous hadiths, some 586 of them according to the Sunni traditionist al-Nawawi (d. 1277). These have been compiled in different works either under the title of Musnad Ali, such as the one compiled by the Sunni author al-Suyuti (d. 1505), or included in larger collections of hadith, such as Musnad Ahmad ibn Hanbal, a canonical Sunni source.

Some early traditions also point to a collection of prophetic sayings gathered by Ali himself, known as Kitab Ali, which is not extant anymore although parts of it have survived in later Shia and Sunni works. As a Shia imam, the statements and practices attributed to Ali are also widely studied in Shia Islam, where they are viewed as the continuation of prophetic teachings. An example is Man la yahduruhu al-faqih, a compilation of hadiths by the Shia jurist Ibn Babawayh (d. 991).

At the same time, Ali is credited with the first systematic evaluations of hadiths, and a discourse attributed to him by the Shia scholar Aban ibn Abi Ayyash (d. c. 755) outlines the various causes of differences among hadiths, including fabrication, abrogation, and generality or particularity of its application. Indeed, Ali is often considered a founding figure for hadith sciences.

== Islamic theology ==
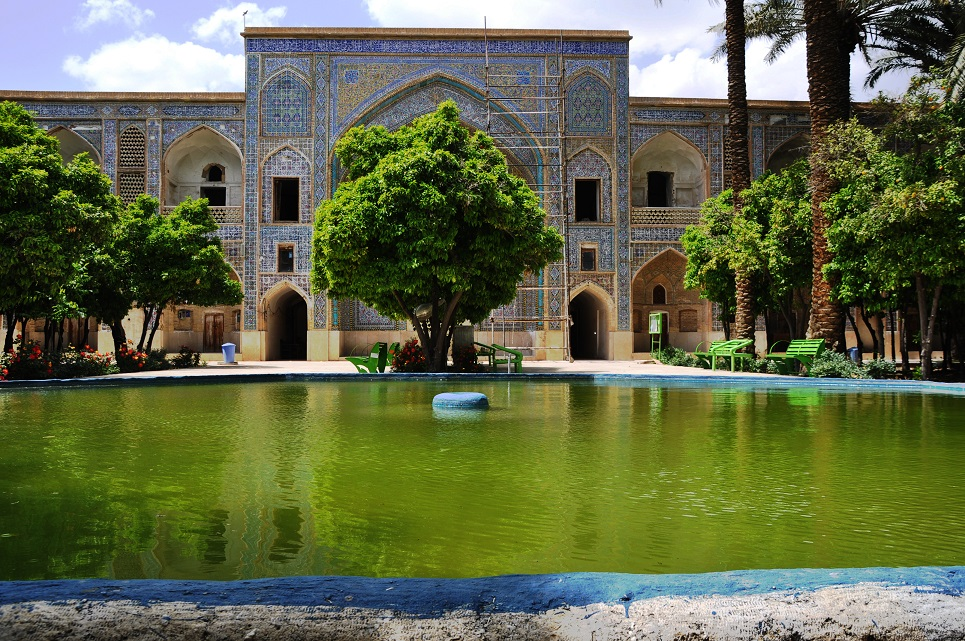
Khan School (est. 1595) in Shiraz, Iran, where the Shia philosopher Mulla Sadra taught. In Sadra school of thought, Ali is celebrated as the foremost metaphysician of Islam.

Ali is credited by some as the founder of Islamic theology. His words are said to contain the first rational proofs among Muslims of the unity of God (tawhid). In later Islamic philosophy, especially in the teachings of the Shia theologian Mulla Sadra (d. c. 1635) and his followers, such as Muhammad H. Tabatabai (d. 1981), Ali's sayings and sermons are regarded as a central source of metaphysical knowledge or divine philosophy. Members of the Sadra school thus regard Ali as the supreme metaphysician of Islam and the first person to have expressed philosophical ideas in Arabic terms.

Some sayings attributed to Ali are viewed as evidence of his supreme metaphysical understanding, including, "I have never seen a thing except to have seen God before it," and, "If the veils were to be removed from the mysteries of the world, it would not add to my certitude." His statement, "Look at what is said and not at who has said it," captures a central characteristic of Islamic thought which places schools of thoughts above individuals. That is, ideas are judged by their inherent philosophical value rather than by their historical sources.

== Nahj al-balagha ==
As a major collection of material attributed to Ali, Nahj al-balagha is a vital source for Shia philosophical doctrines, after the Quran and the sunna of Muhammad. Alongside the written legacy of other Shia imams, Nahj al-balagha and the many commentaries written about it seem responsible for the sustained development of Shia philosophy long after its Sunni counterpart reached a standstill. The influence of Nahj al-balagha on Shia philosophy can be seen in the logical coordination of terms, the deduction of correct conclusions, and the creation of relevant technical terms in Arabic, independent of the translation into Arabic of Greek philosophical works. The essence of Shia philosophy is perhaps captured in a conversation between Ali and his companion Kumayl ibn Ziyad about the nature of the truth (haqiqa) in Nahj al-balagha or in another text, attributed to Ali, in which the esoteric succession of saints in this world is explained.

== See also ==
- Ali in the Quran
- Ali in the Hadith
- Works and contributions attributed to Ali
