= Kitab al-Jafr =

Islamic work of literature

Kitab al-Jafr (Arabic: كِتاب ٱلْجَفْر, romanized: Kitāb al-Jafr) is a mystical book which, in the Shia belief, contains esoteric teachings of the Islamic prophet Muhammad for his cousin and son-in-law Ali, who is recognized as the fourth Rashidun caliph (r. 656–661) and the first Shia Imam. In the Twelver Shia belief, the book was handed down through their line of Twelve Imams, and remains now in the possession of their Hidden Imam, Muhammad al-Mahdi, who would reappear at the end of time to eradicate injustice and evil. In the Sunni lore, the book is instead known as Kitab al-mughaybat (lit. 'the book of hidden things').

== About the book ==
The word jafr (Arabic: جَفْر) means an animal skin, prepared as parchment for writing. In the Shia belief, Kitab al-Jafr is a mystical book with esoteric teachings of Muhammad for Ali. In support of its existence, Ali was once seen transcribing in the presence of Muhammad, as reported by the Shia scholar Ali ibn Babawayh (d. 939) and the Sunni scholars Ibn al-Sam'ani (d. 1166) and Siraj al-Din al-Bulqini (d. 1403). Yet in a hadith by the Sunni traditionist Abu Nu'aym al-Isfahani (d. 1038), Ali denies having received anything from Muhammad except for a folio as tiny as a finger with three short sentences. The Sunni scholars Abd al-Razzaq al-San'ani (d. 827) and al-Bayhaqi (d. 1066) stripped Ali of this folio and transferred its ownership to the second caliph, Umar (r. 632–634). In the Sunni lore, Kitab al-Jafr is known instead as Kitab al-mughaybat (lit. 'the book of hidden things').

Kitab al-Jafr is often mentioned together with Kitab Ali, al-Jami'a, and Mushaf Fatima, which are all said to have been inherited by the Ahl al-Bayt, that is, the House of Muhammad, as part of the esoteric knowledge available to them. More specifically, the Twelver Shia believe that these books were handed down through their line of Twelve Imams, and that al-Jafr is now in the possession of their Hidden Imam, Muhammad al-Mahdi, who would reappear at the end of time to eradicate injustice and evil. Often described in similar terms in Shia sources, all these books are thought to contain esoteric teachings, apocalyptic prophesies, and legal injunctions. In particular, al-Jafr is thought to have addressed all matters of religion, including a detailed penal code that accounted even for bruises. The first mention of al-Jafr is often associated with Ja'far al-Sadiq (d. 765), the sixth of the Twelve Imams. In popular culture, the book is mentioned in the storyline of One Thousand and One Nights, and a description of it is offered by the linguist Richard F. Burton (d. 1890) in his supplement to the book.

== See also ==
- List of Shia books
- Nahj al-Balagha
- Ghurar al-hikam wa durar al-kalim
- Kitab Ali
- Al-Jami'a
- Mushaf Fatima
- Letter Theory
- Raml
