= Bibliography of Ali ibn Abi Talib =

List of books written about Ali ibn Abi Talib

Bibliography of Ali ibn Abi Talib is a list of books written about Ali ibn Abi Talib. Many of Ali's short sayings have become part of Islamic culture and are often quoted in everyday life as proverbs and wise sayings. These sayings have also become the basis for literary works and have been turned into poems in different languages. In the 8th century, writers such as Abd al-Hamid ibn Yahya al-Katib praised the great eloquence of Ali's sermons and sayings. Al-Jahiz, a 9th-century Arab writer, held the same view.

== Classification of works ==
=== Works attributed to Ali ibn Abi Talib ===
==== Nahj al-Balagha ====
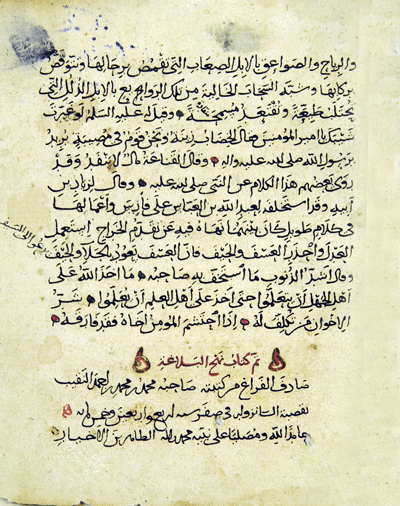
A folio from an old copy of *Nahj al-Balagha*

In the 10th century, the prominent Shi'a scholar Sharif al-Radi collected many of Ali's sermons, letters, and sayings on various subjects in a book called Nahj al-Balagha, which became one of the most popular and influential books in the Islamic world. However, the book was mostly ignored by Western scholars until the 20th century. Although some Western scholars have questioned its authenticity, most Muslims have accepted it as authentic. Nahj al-Balagha is still considered a religious source and an important source of literary inspiration by both Shi'a and Sunni Muslims. Among the sayings attributed to Ali, his letter to Malik al-Ashtar on good governance has received much attention. Seyyed Hossein Modarresi Tabataba'i refers to Riza Ustadi's book Sources of Nahj al-Balagha, which gives evidence that the sayings in Nahj al-Balagha came from Ali.

The book Sayings of Ali from Nahj al-Balagha, translated by Javad Fazel and revised by Sadat Naseri, presents the work in a new form and with a different subject-based arrangement. The book includes Ali ibn Abi Talib's sayings about monotheism, Muhammad ibn Abdullah, leaders and people, government officials, love, war and morality, his instructions to Muhammad ibn Abi Bakr and Malik al-Ashtar, his advice to his son, belief in one God, God's commands, creation, events, worldly attachments, living free from worldly desires, advice, letters, and wisdom.

==== Ghurar al-ḥikam wa durar al-kalim ====
Ghurar al-ḥikam wa durar al-kalim is a collection of Ali ibn Abi Talib's sayings, compiled by Abd al-Wahid al-Tamimi al-Amidi, a fifth-century Shi'a scholar.

==== Mushaf of Ali ====
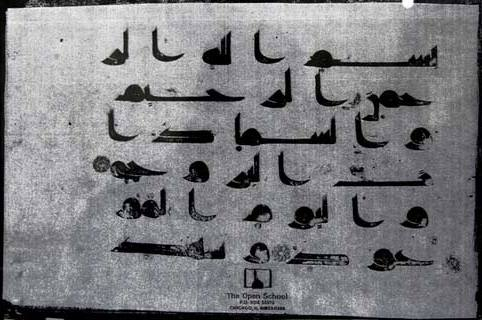
A Quran manuscript attributed to Ali ibn Abi Talib, kept in the library of the Imam Ali Shrine. This page contains verses 1–3 of Surat al-Buruj.

The Mushaf of Ali refers to a copy of the Quran compiled by Ali ibn Abi Talib. Ali was one of the first people to compile the Quran, arranging its surahs in the order they were revealed. It is also said that this mushaf included explanations about the Quran, such as notes on verses that were later replaced by other verses. Shi'a sources say that after Muhammad's death, Ali presented his mushaf to the government group responsible for compiling the Quran, but the Companions objected, and he had to take it back home. Although the Mushaf of Ali is historically accepted as having existed, like the other mushafs of the Companions, the actual manuscript is no longer available. Throughout history, some Shi'a groups have believed that this mushaf was very different from the Quran today, but many Shi'a scholars and Quran scholars have disagreed with them. Ali was also one of the main Quran reciters. A reading attributed to him has survived, and some scholars say that it is the same as the reading of Hafs from Asim.

==== Kitab Ali ====
According to many reports from the second century AH, Kitab Ali is a collection of Muhammad's sayings collected by Ali. It is reported that Ali wrote down what he heard from Muhammad on a piece of leather. Another report says that a scholar in Mecca in the early second century knew about the book and believed that Ali had written it. It is said that the book contained everything people needed, including rules about what is allowed and forbidden, and even compensation for small injuries. It is also reported that the book contained information about al-Jafr.

==== Other works ====
Other works have also been attributed to Ali. These include Du'a' Kumayl, which Ali taught to his student Kumayl ibn Ziyad. It is a long prayer that is still recited by Shi'a Muslims today. Kitab al-Diyat, which gives instructions on how to calculate diya, is included in full in books such as Man La Yahduruhu al-Faqih. Musnad Ali refers to a collection of hadiths from Muhammad that were narrated by Ali and later included in Sunni hadith books such as Musnad Ahmad ibn Hanbal. Later, some people collected Ali's hadiths and called the collection Musnad Ali. Early sources give different accounts of whether Ali wrote poetry or not. Several authors have attributed collections of poetry to Ali, but many of these poems were actually written by others. His companions were also interested in his way of judging and collected his rulings.

=== Artistic and literary works ===
==== Novel ====
One of the novels written about Ali ibn Abi Talib is The Saint, written by Ebrahim Hassanbeigi. The book takes a historical look at Ali ibn Abi Talib's rule during the five years he was caliph. The novel tells the story of a priest who loves collecting old books and manuscripts and is very passionate about it. The priest's love of old manuscripts leads him to a Tajik man who wants to sell his book. But when something is valuable, there are always people who want to take advantage of it. The Tajik man is killed by a group of criminals, and the priest's house is robbed as well. This is the beginning of a story that eventually makes the priest interested in the life of Ali ibn Abi Talib.

==== Poetry and prose ====
Muslims, especially Shi'a Muslims, have also used poetry and prose to praise Ali ibn Abi Talib, describe his virtues, and write about his life and the events around him. In this field, the Ali-nama can be considered one of the earliest works of poetry praising the Shi'a Imams, especially Ali ibn Abi Talib, and describing historical events around them. The author of the book is identified as Rabi', an otherwise unknown poet from the fifth century. It is written as an epic poem.

=== Historical works ===
One of the historical works that focuses specifically on the life of Ali ibn Abi Talib is al-Sahih min Sirat al-Imam Ali, written by Ja'far Murtada al-Amili. The book was published in Arabic in 53 volumes. The book is divided into three main parts: Ali ibn Abi Talib's life during the time of the Prophet Muhammad (eight and a half volumes); his life from the Prophet's death until people pledged allegiance to him after Uthman ibn Affan was killed (nine and a half volumes); and the events that took place after people pledged allegiance to Ali (the remaining volumes).

=== Commentaries and explanations ===
Many books have been written about the words of Ali ibn Abi Talib in different fields. Among the most important of these works are commentaries on Nahj al-Balagha. Among them is Muhammad-Taqi Ja'fari's commentary on Nahj al-Balagha, which examines Ali ibn Abi Talib's words from a philosophical perspective in 25 volumes. In this commentary, Muhammad-Taqi Ja'fari tried to explore the different aspects of Ali ibn Abi Talib's words, including philosophy, theology, mysticism, law, society, politics, and psychology.

== Selected works ==
Among the works written about Ali ibn Abi Talib are the following:

Book title	Author	Commentator and translator	Century	Language	Volumes	Pages	Subject
Hal Qatala Mu'awiya Aliyan?	Najah Ta'i			Arabic	1	266	History
One Thousand Hadiths	Ali ibn Abi Talib	Kazemi Khalkhali		Persian	1	243	Commentary and translation of sayings
Wilayat-nameh	Muhammad ibn Husayn Sharif al-Radi			Persian	1	192	Studies on Ali
The Authority of Ali in the Qur'an and the Sunnah of the Prophet	Sayyid Murtada Askari		Contemporary	Persian	1	180	Critique of Abu Salman Abd al-Mun'im Baluch
Waq'at Siffin	Nasr ibn Muzahim			Arabic	1	710	History
The Highest Human Unity	Muhammad-Taqi Ja'fari		Contemporary	Persian	1	98	Studies on Ali
Nahj al-Sa'ada fi Mustadrak Nahj al-Balagha	Muhammad-Baqir Mahmudī			Persian	14	372	Commentary and translation of sayings
Nahj al-Balagha: A Collection of the Sayings of Amir al-Mu'minin Abu al-Hasan Ali ibn Abi Talib, Selected by Sharif Abu al-Hasan Muhammad al-Radi ibn al-Hasan al-Musawi	Muhammad Abduh			Arabic	1	872	Commentary and translation of sayings
Nahj al-Balagha: Short Sayings of Imam Ali ibn Abi Talib	Abu al-Hasan Muhammad ibn Husayn Sharif al-Radi	Mustafa Zamani		Persian	1	496	Commentary and translation of sayings
Nahj al-Balagha: The Way of Life	Hossein-Ali Montazeri		Contemporary	Persian	1	224	Commentary and translation of sayings
Thematic Nahj al-Balagha	Abbas Azizi			Persian	1	904	Commentary and translation of sayings
Nahj al-Balagha in the Words of Ali	Mohsen Farsi		Contemporary	Persian	1	564	Commentary and translation of sayings
Nahj al-Balagha with a Verse Translation	Omid Majd		Contemporary	Persian	1	600	Commentary and translation of sayings
Nahj al-Balagha of Imam Ali	Asadollah Mobashshiri			Persian	1	1448	Commentary and translation of sayings
Nush o Nish: Sweet and Sharp Humor in Nahj al-Balagha	Hossein Bayat			Persian	1	104	Commentary and translation of sayings
An Example of Ali's Government	Hasan Sa'id			Persian	1	312	Studies on Ali
Prayer and Worship of Amir al-Mu'minin	Abbas Azizi		Contemporary	Persian	1	112	Studies on Ali
Nasikh al-Tawarikh	Muhammad-Taqi Sepehr			Persian	1	419	History
Encyclopedia of Imam Ali ibn Abi Talib in the Qur'an, Sunnah and History	Muhammad Muhammadi Reyshahri		Contemporary	Arabic	12	318	History
Minhaj al-Bara'a fi Sharh Nahj al-Balagha	Habibollah Hashemi Khu'i			Arabic	6	422	Commentary and translation of sayings
Manaqib Murtazavi fi Manaqib Shah-e Awliya	Muhammad-Salih ibn Abdullah Kashfi Tirmidhi			Persian	1	560	Studies on Ali
The Leader of the Mystics in the Eyes of the Seal of the Prophets	Kawkab A'zam Kakui		Contemporary	Persian	1	176	Studies on Ali
Vocabulary of Nahj al-Balagha	Sayyid Ali-Akbar Qurashi		Contemporary	Persian	2	576	Commentary and translation of sayings
Miftah al-Sa'ada fi Sharh Nahj al-Balagha	Muhammad-Taqi Naqavi Qaini Khurasani / Sayyid Muhammad-Taqi al-Naqavi al-Qaini al-Khurasani			Arabic	7	572	Commentary and translation of sayings
Miftah al-Sa'ada fi Sharh Nahj al-Balagha	Sayyid Muhammad-Taqi Naqavi Qaini			Persian	17	556	Commentary and translation of sayings
Miracles of Amir al-Mu'minin	Habibollah Akbarpour			Persian	1	384	Studies on Ali
Matlub Kul Talib min Kalam Ali ibn Abi Talib	Rashid al-Din Watwat			Arabic	1	228	Commentary and translation of sayings
Misbah al-Muwahhidin	Abbas-Ali Vahidi Monfared		Contemporary	Persian	1	244	Studies on Ali
Musnad of Imam Ali	Sayyid Hasan Qabanji			Arabic	10	578	Studies on Ali
The Infinite Man (Ali ibn Abi Talib)	Hossein Sadr			Persian	1	234	Studies on Ali
Majlis-e Zarb-e Zadan	Bahram Beyzai		Contemporary	Persian	1	?	Play
Never Like Ali	Sayyid Abd al-Rasul Hijazi			Persian	2	540	Studies on Ali
One Hundred Virtues from the Virtues of Amir al-Mu'minin	Fadl ibn Shadhan		2nd century AH	Arabic	1	224	Studies on Ali
Eternal Word	Muhammad Hakimi		Contemporary	Persian	1	264	Commentary and translation of sayings
Kashf al-Yaqin fi Fada'il Amir al-Mu'minin	Hasan ibn Yusuf al-Allama al-Hilli		8th century AH	Arabic	1	544	Studies on Ali
Karamat al-Alawiyya	Ali Mirkhalafzadeh		Contemporary	Persian	1	288	Studies on Ali
A Drop from the Sea: A Look at the Wisdoms of Nahj al-Balagha	Akbar Hamidzadeh			Persian	2	510	Commentary and translation of sayings
Our Century in Search of Ali	Ali Shariati		Contemporary	Persian	1	74	Studies on Ali
The Saint	Ibrahim Hasanbeigi		Contemporary	Persian	1	?	Novel
Qasitin, Mariqin, Naqithin	Ali Shariati		Contemporary	Persian	1	196	History
Fi Zilal Nahj al-Balagha: An Attempt at a New Understanding	Muhammad-Jawad Mughniyah			Arabic	4	558	Commentary and translation of sayings
Fi Rihab Nahj al-Balagha	Morteza Motahhari	Hadi Yousefi	Contemporary	Persian	1	240	Commentary and translation of sayings
Fi al-Fikr al-Ijtima'i 'inda al-Imam Ali	Abd al-Rida Zubaidi			Arabic	1	396	Commentary and translation of sayings
Virtues of Ali ibn Abi Talib According to Shi'a and Sunni Sources	Ahmad Akhavan Aramaki			Persian	1	304	Studies on Ali
The Virtues of Ali According to Non-Shi'a Sources	Muhammad-Taqi Sarfi		Contemporary	Persian	1	96	Studies on Ali
Dictionary of the Commentaries on Nahj al-Balagha	Muhammad Dashti		Contemporary	Persian	3	552	Commentary and translation of sayings
Forugh-e Velayat	Ja'far Subhani		Contemporary	Persian	1	780	History
Ali's Instructions for a Good Life in the Last Moments of His Life	Ahmad Faqihi			Persian	1	237	Studies on Ali
Attractive and Readable Passages from Imam Ali	Muhammad-Taqi Ja'fari		Contemporary	Persian	1	158	Commentary and translation of sayings
Fitna	Muhammad-Taqi Ja'fari		Contemporary	Persian	1	108	Studies on Ali
Ali: A Reality in the Form of Legends	Ali Shariati		Contemporary	Persian	1	82	Studies on Ali
Ali and the Prophets	Mahmud Sialkoti	Sayyid Mohammad Mokhtari		Persian	1	64	Studies on Ali
Who Is Ali?	Fazlollah Kampani			Persian	1	476	Studies on Ali
Ali, Slayer of the Arabs	Qasim Qaradaghi		Contemporary	Persian	1	101	Studies on Ali
Ali and Kumayl	Ahmad Zomordian			Persian	1	460	Studies on Ali
Ali, the Champion of Values	Muhammad-Hasan Pakrah		Contemporary	Persian	1	332	Studies on Ali
Ali, the Brilliant Face of Islam	Ibn Abi al-Hadid	Ali Davani		Persian	1	30	Studies on Ali
Ali, the Masterpiece of Creation	Abbas-Ali Shabgahi Shabestari		Contemporary	Persian	1	528	Studies on Ali
Ali, the Most Beautiful Poem of Existence	Sayyid Ja'far Shahidi		Contemporary	Persian	1	208	Studies on Ali
Ali, the Greatest Judge (Ali's Judgments)	Muhammad-Taqi Shushtari	Abu al-Fadl Dibachi		Persian	1	730	History
Ali al-Imam al-Mubin	Ali Abu al-Khayr			Arabic	1	328	Studies on Ali
Ali, the Great Man of History	Abu al-Qasim Payandeh	Abd al-Karim Jarbazdar	Contemporary	Persian	1	96	Studies on Ali
Ali and Mu'awiya	Vartges Hafkin	Muhammad-Ibrahim Zamani Ashtiani		Persian	1	660	Studies on Ali
Ali and Divine Philosophy	Sayyid Muhammad-Husayn Tabataba'i	Sayyid Ibrahim Sayyid Alavi	Contemporary	Persian	1	72	Studies on Ali
Ali and His Shi'a	Najm al-Din Askari	Ali Karami		Persian	1	200	Studies on Ali
Ali and Human Rights	George Jordac	Ata-Muhammad Sardarnia		Persian	5	304	Studies on Ali
Ali and Human Rights	George Jordac	Sayyid Hadi Khosrowshahi		Persian	5	?	Studies on Ali
Ali and Forty Virtues According to Sunni Sources	Ali Fazl Birjandi		Contemporary	Persian	1	268	Studies on Ali
Ali, the Measure of Truth	Muhammad Guzel Amedi			Arabic	1	550	Studies on Ali
Ali, Source of Virtues and Perfections	Sayyid Sadiq Husayni Yazdi			Persian	1	512	Studies on Ali
Ali, Commander of the Islamic Army	Ayutalib Ehsani		Contemporary	Persian	1	416	Studies on Ali
Ali in Sunni Books	Sayyid Muhammad-Baqir Musavi Hamadani		Contemporary	Persian	1	530	Studies on Ali
Ali in the Words of Umar	Fuad Farooqi			Persian	1	136	Studies on Ali
Ali in the Words of the Martyred Scholar Morteza Motahhari	Abbas Azizi		Contemporary	Persian	1	256	Studies on Ali
Ali, the Mirror of Truth	Ali Saqafi		Contemporary	Persian	1	208	Studies on Ali
Ali, the Mirror of God	Abbas Shaykh al-Ra'is			Persian	1	482	Studies on Ali
Ali	Ali Shariati		Contemporary	Persian	1	714	Studies on Ali
Attributes of God's Beauty and Majesty in Nahj al-Balagha	Muhammad-Husayn Mokhtari Mazandarani			Persian	1		Commentary and translation of sayings
Companions According to Nahj al-Balagha	Davud Elhami		Contemporary	Persian	1	208	Commentary and translation of sayings
Wonders of Nahj al-Balagha	George Jordac	Fakhr al-Din Hejazi		Persian	1	323	Commentary and translation of sayings
Sharh Nahj al-Balagha	Muhammad-Taqi Ja'fari		Contemporary	Persian	25	314	Commentary and translation of sayings
Sharh al-Muhaqqiq al-Bari' Jamal al-Din Muhammad Khwansari on Ghurar al-Hikam wa Durar al-Kalim	Muhammad ibn Husayn Aqa Jamal Khwansari			Persian	1	544	Commentary and translation of sayings
Commentary on One Hundred Short Sayings from the Words of Amir al-Mu'minin	Abbas Qummi			Persian	1	110	Commentary and translation of sayings
Biography of Imam Ali ibn Abi Talib	Ali-Akbar Khadivar Mohseni			Persian	3	480	History
Commentary on the Qasi'a Sermon	Hossein-Ali Montazeri		Contemporary	Persian	1	316	Commentary and translation of sayings
The Image of Imam Ali, the Leader of the Pious and Wali of God	Abd al-Rahman Sharqawi	Abd al-Karim Bi-Azar Shirazi		Persian	5	24	Studies on Ali
A Study of Nahj al-Balagha	Morteza Motahhari		Contemporary	Persian	1	332	Commentary and translation of sayings
Alawi Biography	Muhammad-Baqir Behbudi			Persian	1	223	Studies on Ali
Ask Me Before You Lose Me	Muhammad Hakimi		Contemporary	Persian	1	344	Studies on Ali
Political Planning in Nahj al-Balagha	Muhammad-Taqi Rahbar	Abd al-Karim Mahmud	Contemporary	Persian	1	214	Commentary and translation of sayings
Lessons from Nahj al-Balagha	Ali Khamenei		Contemporary	Persian	1	155	Commentary and translation of sayings
Lessons from Nahj al-Balagha	Muhammad Fazel Movahedi Lankarani			Persian	1	228	Commentary and translation of sayings
Lessons of Nahj al-Balagha	Sayyid Ali-Muhammad Dastghayb		Contemporary	Persian	25	48	Commentary and translation of sayings
Lessons of Nahj al-Balagha	Hossein Ansarian			Persian	1		Commentary and translation of sayings
On the Knowledge, Virtues and Merits of Amir al-Mu'minin	Hasan Arab-Baqi		Contemporary	Persian	1	912	Studies on Ali
At the Court of the Sun: Nahj al-Balagha in Persian Literature	Alireza Mirza-Muhammad			Persian	1	384	Commentary and translation of sayings
Encyclopedia of Imam Ali	Islamic Culture and Thought Research Institute		Contemporary	Persian	12	546	History
Stories of Imam Ali from Bihar al-Anwar	Ja'far Husayni		Contemporary	Persian	1	240	History
Khasa'is Amir al-Mu'minin Ali ibn Abi Talib	Hafiz al-Nasa'i		3rd century AH		1	?	Studies on Ali
Khasa'is Amir al-Mu'minin Ali ibn Abi Talib	Muhammad-Kazim Mahmudī		Contemporary	Persian	1	334	Studies on Ali
Khawaran-nameh	Ibn Husam Khusfi		8th century AH	Persian	1	?	Poetry
Hayat Amir al-Mu'minin 'alayhi al-salam 'an lisanihi	Muhammad Muhammadian			Arabic	7	400	Commentary and translation of sayings
Hayat Amir al-Mu'minin Ali	Sayyid-Asghar Nazemzadeh Qomi		Contemporary	Arabic	1	510	Studies on Ali
Hamla-ye Heydari	Bazel Mashhadi		11th century AH	Persian	1	?	Poetry
The Government of Justice of Ali ibn Abi Talib, Including His Orders and Conduct	Isma'il Rasulzadeh Khu'i			Persian	1	592	Studies on Ali
Islamic Government in Nahj al-Balagha	Sayyid Ali Ghazanfari			Persian	1	344	Commentary and translation of sayings
Wisdom and Livelihood: A Commentary on Imam Ali's Letter to Imam Hasan	Abdolkarim Soroush		Contemporary	Persian	1	397	Commentary and translation of sayings
Theoretical and Practical Wisdom in Nahj al-Balagha	Abdullah Javadi Amoli		Contemporary	Persian	1	168	Commentary and translation of sayings
Practical Wisdom, or, Murtazavi Ethics	Mehdi Elahi Qomshe'i		Contemporary	Persian	1	200	Studies on Ali
Mutual Rights of the People and Rulers in Islam	Muhammad-Taqi Ja'fari		Contemporary	Persian	1	142	Studies on Ali
Why Is Ali Needed? Ali, the Founder of Unity	Ali Shariati		Contemporary	Persian	1	74	Studies on Ali
Jawahir al-Matalib fi Manaqib al-Imam Ali ibn Abi Talib	Muhammad Ba'unī al-Shafi'i		7th century AH	Arabic	1	386	Studies on Ali
War and Peace According to Imam Ali	Muhammad Mahdi Shams al-Din			Persian	1	116	Studies on Ali
Expressions of Eloquence in Nahj al-Balagha	Muhammad Khaghani			Persian	1	392	Commentary and translation of sayings
History in the Commentary on Nahj al-Balagha	Ibn Abi al-Hadid			Persian	8	440	Commentary and translation of sayings
A Search in Nahj al-Balagha	Muhammad-Mahdi Shams al-Din	Mahmud Abedi		Persian	1	238	Commentary and translation of sayings
Religious Sociology in Nahj al-Balagha	Sayyid Shahab al-Din Husayni		Contemporary	Persian	1	168	Commentary and translation of sayings
Alawi Society in Nahj al-Balagha	Abd al-Husayn Khosropanah		Contemporary	Persian	1	234	Commentary and translation of sayings
The Attraction and Repulsion of Ali	Morteza Motahhari		Contemporary	Persian	1	198	Studies on Ali
Tahdhib Sharh Nahj al-Balagha by Ibn Abi al-Hadid al-Mu'tazili	Sayyid Abd al-Hadi Sharifi			Persian	2	712	Commentary and translation of sayings
Explanation of Nahj al-Balagha	Sayyid Muhammad Husayni Shirazi		Contemporary	Persian	4	966	Commentary and translation of sayings
Tanbih al-Ghafilin wa Tadhkirat al-'Arifin	Fathollah Kashani			Persian	1	580	Commentary and translation of sayings
God-consciousness	Muhammad-Taqi Ja'fari		Contemporary	Persian	1	96	Studies on Ali
Tafdhil Amir al-Mu'minin	Muhammad ibn Muhammad al-Shaykh al-Mufid		3rd century AH	Arabic	1	48	Studies on Ali
Classification of Nahj al-Balagha	Labib Baydoun			Arabic	1	1004	Commentary and translation of sayings
Translation and Commentary of Nahj al-Balagha	Muhammad ibn al-Husayn Sayyid al-Radi	Sayyid Mahmud Taleqani		Persian	1	197	Commentary and translation of sayings
Translation and Commentary of Nahj al-Balagha	Sayyid Alinaghi Feiz al-Islam Isfahani			Persian	1	1348	Commentary and translation of sayings
Translation of Nahj al-Balagha	Muhammad ibn al-Husayn Sayyid al-Radi	Mohammad-Javad Shari'at		Persian	1	1050	Commentary and translation of sayings
A Clear Translation and Concise Commentary on Nahj al-Balagha	Ja'far Emami / Mohammad-Reza Ashtiani / Naser Makarem Shirazi		Contemporary	Persian	1	481	Commentary and translation of sayings
Translation and Commentary of the Noble Nahj al-Balagha	Muhammad Abduh	Ali-Asghar Faqihi		Persian	1	991	Commentary and translation of sayings
Translation of Irshad al-Qulub by Daylami	Hasan ibn Abi al-Hasan al-Daylami	Ali Salgi	8th century AH	Persian	1	394	Studies on Ali
Translation of Irshad al-Qulub	Hasan ibn Abi al-Hasan al-Daylami	Sayyid Abd al-Husayn Reza'i	8th century AH	Persian	2	446	Studies on Ali
Tuhfat al-Shahiyya fi Manaqib Mawla Amir al-Mu'minin	Abd al-Khaliq Qazi-Zadeh Karharudi		11th century AH	Persian	1	476	Studies on Ali
The Influence of Nahj al-Balagha and the Words of Imam Ali on Persian Poetry	Mohsen Rathi			Persian	1	672	Commentary and translation of sayings
Prophecies of Amir al-Mu'minin Ali ibn Abi Talib	Sayyid Muhammad Najafi Yazdi			Persian	1	392	Commentary and translation of sayings
The Prophet in the Words of Ali	Muhammad-Taqi Ja'fari		Contemporary	Persian	1	134	Commentary and translation of sayings
The Message of the Master from His Deathbed	Muhammad-Taqi Mesbah Yazdi		Contemporary	Persian	1	304	Commentary and translation of sayings
The Message of Imam Amir al-Mu'minin	Naser Makarem Shirazi		Contemporary	Persian	15	668	Commentary and translation of sayings
Eternal Advice: The Wisdoms of Nahj al-Balagha	Muhammad Dashti		Contemporary	Persian	1	272	Commentary and translation of sayings
Twenty-Five Years of Ali's Silence	Fuad Farooqi			Persian	1	278	History
Bahjat al-Sabaghah fi Sharh Nahj al-Balagha	Muhammad-Taqi Shushtari			Arabic	14	100	Commentary and translation of sayings
Toward the Ideal City	Ali Karimi Jahromi		Contemporary	Persian	1	276	Studies on Ali
Strategic Planning for Women's Issues in Nahj al-Balagha	Simin-Dokht Behzadpour			Persian	1	176	Commentary and translation of sayings
Surviving Sections of the Book Fada'il Ali ibn Abi Talib and the Book al-Wilaya	Muhammad ibn Jarir al-Tabari al-Amuli	Rasul Ja'farian	2nd century AH	Persian	1	100	Studies on Ali
Ahl al-Bayt: A Meeting Point for Muslims	Zuhair Sulayman			Arabic	1	112	Studies on Ali
Descriptions of the Pious	Abdolkarim Soroush		Contemporary	Persian	1	442	Studies on Ali
Man and the Human Mission	Muhammad-Taqi Ja'fari		Contemporary	Persian	1	76	Studies on Ali
The Perfect Man According to Nahj al-Balagha	Hasan Hasan-Zadeh Amoli		Contemporary	Persian	1	96	Commentary and translation of sayings
Political Thought in the Alawi Discourse	Islamic Sciences and Culture Research Institute		Contemporary	Persian	1	884	Studies on Ali
Amir al-Mu'minin during the Prophet's Lifetime	Sayyid Muhammad-Sadiq Sadr	Sayyid Jamal Mousavi		Persian	1	460	History
Amir al-Mu'minin Ali: God's Caliph, the Greatest Truthful One and the Greatest Discriminator	Ali Davani		Contemporary	Persian	1	207	Studies on Ali
Amir al-Mu'minin Ali in the Hadiths of Others	Sayyid Hojjat Musavi Khu'i			Persian	1	220	Studies on Ali
Imamate of Ali between Reason and the Qur'an	Muhammad-Jawad Mughniyah			Arabic	1	368	Studies on Ali
Imamology	Sayyid Muhammad-Salih Musavi Khu'i			Persian	1	456	Studies on Ali
Imam Ali According to Rumi	Muhammad-Taqi Ja'fari		Contemporary	Persian	1	108	Studies on Ali
Imam Ali According to Sunni and Jama'at Scholars	Farooq Safizadeh		Contemporary	Persian	1	64	Studies on Ali
Imam Ali and Matters of Belief	Muhammad Dashti		Contemporary	Persian	1	408	Commentary and translation of sayings
Imam Ali, Science and Art	Muhammad Dashti		Contemporary	Persian	?	592	Studies on Ali
Imam Ali and the Kharijites	Sayyid Ja'far Morteza Ameli	Mohammad Sepehri	Contemporary	Persian	1	682	History
Imam Ali and Human Rights	Sayyid Mustafa Mohaghegh Damad			Persian	?		Studies on Ali
Imam Ali: Justice and Balance	Muhammad Hakimi		Contemporary	Persian	1	192	Studies on Ali
Imam Ali, the Voice of Human Justice: Ali, the Inspiration of the French Revolution	George Jordac	Sayyid Hadi Khosrowshahi		Persian	5	508	Studies on Ali
Imam Ali According to Muslim and Christian Scholars	Goodarz Najafi		Contemporary	Persian	1	240	Studies on Ali
Imam Ali, the Everlasting Sun	Muhammad-Ibrahim Seraj		Contemporary	Persian	1	386	Studies on Ali
Imam Ali According to Scholars	Mehdi Mehrizi / Hadi Rabbani		Contemporary	Persian	3	608	Studies on Ali
Theology in Nahj al-Balagha	Lotfollah Safi Golpaygani		Contemporary	Persian	1	476	Commentary and translation of sayings
Inspiration from the Words of Ali	Sayyid Muhammad-Taqi Hakim			Persian	1	240	Commentary and translation of sayings
Al-Hadi ila Mawdu'at Nahj al-Balagha	Ali Meshkini Ardabili			Arabic	1	622	Commentary and translation of sayings
Al-Manaqib	Muwaffaq ibn Ahmad Akhtab al-Khwarizmi		6th century AH	Arabic	1	416	Studies on Ali
Al-Ma'sum al-Thani: Imam Ali ibn Abi Talib	Mehdi Lagvardī			Arabic	2	494	Studies on Ali
Al-Mu'jam al-Mufahras li-Alfaz Nahj al-Balagha	Kazem Mohammadi / Mahmoud Dashti			Arabic	1	1467	Commentary and translation of sayings
Al-Lawami' al-Nuraniyya fi Asma' Ali wa Ahl Baytihi al-Qur'aniyya	Sayyid Hashim Husayni Bahrani			Arabic	1	560	Studies on Ali
Behavioral Models of Imam Ali: Imam Ali and Islamic Economics	Muhammad Dashti		Contemporary	Persian	2	464	Studies on Ali
Al-Ghadir	Abd al-Husayn Amini		Contemporary	Arabic	11	?	Studies on Ali
Al-Sahih min Sirat al-Imam Ali	Sayyid Ja'far Morteza Ameli		Contemporary	Arabic	53		History
Al-Dalil ala Mawdu'at Nahj al-Balagha	Ali Ansarian	Isma'il Tajbakhsh		Persian	1	1030	Commentary and translation of sayings
Al-Durr al-Thamin fi Khams Mi'a Aya Nazalat fi Mawlana Amir al-Mu'minin	Hafiz Rajab al-Bursi			Arabic	1	324	Studies on Ali
Al-Haqq al-Mubin fi Qadawat Amir al-Mu'minin	Zabihollah Mahallati			Persian	1	453	Studies on Ali
Al-Jawhara fi Nasab al-Imam Ali wa Alihi	Muhammad ibn Abi Bakr Berri			Arabic	1	126	Studies on Ali
Al-Bayan al-Jali fi Afdaliyyat Mawla al-Mu'minin Ali	Muhammad ibn Ahmad Ibn Rushd		5th century AH	Arabic	1	264	Studies on Ali
Al-Bariqa al-Haydariyya fi al-Asrar al-Alawiyya	Adel Alawi			Arabic	1	334	Studies on Ali
Al-Imam Ali wa Mushkilat Nizam al-Hukm	Muhammad Tay			Arabic	1	228	Studies on Ali
Al-Imam Ali: Qudwa wa Uswa	Sayyid Muhammad-Taqi Modarresi		Contemporary	Arabic	1	204	Studies on Ali
Al-Imam Ali: Kalimat al-Taqwa	Muhammad-Ja'far Modarresi		Contemporary	Arabic	1	120	Studies on Ali
Eftekharnama-ye Heydari	Mustafa Eftekhari al-'Ulama (Sahba)		13th century AH	Persian	1	?	Poetry
Documents and Evidence of Nahj al-Balagha	Muhammad Dashti		Contemporary	Persian	1	820	Commentary and translation of sayings
Questions of the People and Answers of Amir al-Mu'minin	Ahmad Qazi-Zahidi			Arabic	1	432	Commentary and translation of sayings
Islamic Ethics in Nahj al-Balagha	Akbar Khadem al-Zakerin			Persian	2	608	Commentary and translation of sayings
Ikhtiyar Misbah al-Salikin: From the Words of Our Master and Imam, Amir al-Mu'minin	Maytham ibn Ali Ibn Maytham			Arabic	1	724	Commentary and translation of sayings
Statecraft According to Imam Ali	Muhammad Fazel Movahedi Lankarani			Persian	1	208	Studies on Ali
Qur'anic Verses in Nahj al-Balagha	Muhammad Muhammadi Eshtihardi			Persian	1	320	Commentary and translation of sayings
Introduction to Nahj al-Balagha	Sayyid Muhammad-Mahdi Ja'fari			Persian	1	248	Commentary and translation of sayings

== See also ==
- Ali ibn Abi Talib
- Nahj al-Balagha
- Kitab Ali
- Mus'haf of Ali
