= Kitab Ali =

7th-century Shia book

Kitab Ali (Arabic: کتاب علي, romanized: Kitāb ʿAlī) or Sahifat Ali (Arabic: صحيفة علي, romanized: Saḥīfat ʿAlī), or simply the Book of Ali, is a compilation of Muhammad's sayings that Ali is said to have written as Muhammad dictated it to him. It is said that the jurist of Mecca was aware of this text around the beginning of the second century, and was certain that Ali was the author. The book has been mentioned in both Sunni and Shia canonical sources. In Shia tradition, Ja'far al-Sadiq is said to have confirmed his possession of the Sahifa of Ali. (Note: [...] on the authority of Imam al- Ṣādiq who said: “By Allah we do have the Ṣaḥīfa, in it is all that which the people require, even the indemnity (compensation) for a scratch, it is the dictation of the messenger of Allah and the script of ʿAlī in his hand”.) References to other written works by Ali are also found in Sahih al-Bukhari, Sahih Muslim and Musnad Ahmad ibn Hanbal.

Regarding the book's content, it is claimed to have included all the information people might have needed on the topics of lawfulness (halal) and unlawfulness (haram), including a thorough penal code that took into consideration even minor physical injuries. Kitab Ali is frequently associated with al-Jafr, a book that, according to Shia belief, was given to Ali by Muhammad and is thought to contain esoteric lessons for Muhammad's household.

== Authenticity ==
According to an early narrative, Ali was reportedly observed writing what he heard from the Prophet Muhammad in his presence on a piece of parchment. (Note: See Saffar: 163 (paragraph # 4, see also 160, para. # 31); Ali b. Babawayh, Imama: 174; Ramhurmuzi : 601; Sam’ani, Adab al-imla’: 12, 13; Bulqayni: 300.) The material from the second century is replete with allusions to and citations from a text thought to have been put together by Ali from the Prophet's sayings. According to a report, Ata ibn Abi Rabah, the jurisconsult of Mecca in the early second century (d. 114), knew this text and had no doubt that it was actually Ali's compilation.

One account states that Muhammad gave the book to his wife Umm Salama shortly before his passing and gave her instructions to give it to the person who would request it from the pulpit.; Abu Bakr, Umar and Uthman did not do so, but Ali did. Al-Baqir reports that just before leaving for the battle of Karbala, al-Husayn gave his oldest daughter Fatima a "rolled up book" ((kitāb malfūf or mudarraj)). Fatima then gave it to her brother Zayn al-Abidin, through whom it eventually made its way to Muhammad al-Baqir. It was believed that Zayn al-Abidin, Muhammad al-Baqir, and Ja'far al-Sadiq owned the book. Although some of the quotations from Ja'far al-Sadiq were through his father, the latter two regularly quoted from it. The work was occasionally referenced by later Imams.

== Similar works ==
According to some accounts, the Book of Ali is a 70-cubit-long parchment scroll. This is the same as how a scroll known as al-Jami'a was described in some other reports; both were claimed to contain information that people require regarding lawfulness and unlawfulness, inheritance rules, and even monetary compensation for physical injuries. Another document named the Book of Fatima also has a similar description of the material, size, and contents. Another manuscript known as the al-Jafr is periodically brought up in connection with the specific description that suggests the text contained everything individuals needed, even money to compensate for bruising. Both of the latter compositions were thought to be composed of Ali's notes that he took while listening to the Prophet speak. However, references to these last two writings tend to focus on esoteric and apocalyptic topics, with the first being mentioned largely and the latter being mentioned entirely. All of them were supposedly a part of the House of the Prophet's written legacy, which many early Shias believed had been carried down via the line of the Imams and had given them the unique knowledge that set them apart from the rest of the community, including the erudite.

== Content ==
According to Mohammad Ali Amir-Moezzi, the Book of Ali refers either to the recension of the Qur'an done by Ali or to the writing down of the posthumous remarks made by the Prophet Muhammad to Ali. In the latter case, the Book is said to contain the account of "all that will take place up to the Day of the Resurrection." The Book or the kitâb containing the list of all the sovereigns of the earth is either called The Book of Ali, or The Book of Fatima. It is also allegedly containing the list of the faithful of the twelve imams, the "true Shî'ites" and their genealogy.

According to Hossein Modarressi although a few subsequent esoteric accounts are also credited to the Book of Ali, the vast bulk of passages from it are legal injunctions. There were also certain manuscripts from the first centuries that supporters of Ali created on his virtues (fad 'a 'il) or from his words and deeds, frequently as direct quotations from him. General biographical texts also make mention of this type. The Book of Ali has been referenced in the following early sources:

- Law
  - On prayer: (Shafi‘i 2: 126– Saffar: 165– Kafi 3: 397– Ibid. 3: 175– Tahdhib 2: 23, 251– Ibid. 2: 102– Ibid. 2: 243– Ibid. 3: 28 (see also ibid. 1: 142))
  - On fasting: (Tahdhib 4:158)
  - On pilgrimage to Mecca: (Bazanti, Nawadir: 33 (also Tahdhib 5: 152)– Kafi 4: 340 (also Faqih 2: 338; 'Ilal 2: 94 [fı Kitab jaddı ])– Kafi 4: 368 (also Tahdhib 1: 329)– Kafi 4: 389–90 (two variants, also Tahdhib 5: 355 [and 357 with variations])– Kafi 4: 390 (also Tahdhib 5: 344)– Kafi 4: 534– Ibn Hazm 7: 102–3 (quoting ‘Abd al-Razzaq))
  - On holy war: (Kafi 2: 666, 5: 31( fı kitab li-‘Alı in the second case)
  - On prohibitions: Husayn b. Sa‘ı d, Zuhd: 39 (also Kafi 2: 347; 'Iqab: 261 [repeated at 270–71]; Khisal: 124)– ‘Ayyashi 1: 223 (also 'Iqab: 278)– Kafi 2: 71–2– Ibid. 2: 278–9– Ibid. 5: 541 (also Ibn Babawayh, Amali : 385; ‘Ilal 2: 271; 'Iqab: 301; cf. Kafi 2: 374 where a longer version of the same report is attributed in a different transmission to Kitab Rasul Allah) – Ibn Babawayh, Amali : 509–18 (also Faqih 4: 3–18)– 'Ilal 2: 160–61 (also Khisal 1: 273))
  - On marriage and divorce: (Ahmad b. 'Isa 3: 51– Ahmad b. Muhammad b. 'Isa: 79 (also Tahdhib 7: 432), 87 (also Kafi 5:452)– Faqih 3: 416 (also 'Ilal 2: 188; Tahdhib 7: 481, 490)– Tahdhib 8: 82)
  - On property: ('Ala' b. Razin: 153 (whence Faqih 3: 452)– ‘Ayyashi 2:25 (also Kafi 1: 407, 5: 279–80)
  - On dietetics: ('Ali b. Ja'far: 115 (also Kafi 6: 219, 220 [with variations]; Tahdhib 9: 2, 4,5 [also 6])– 'Abd al-Razzaq 4: 532 (also Bayhaqi 9: 258)– 'Ayyashi 1:294, 295 (also Kafi 6: 202, 207)– Kafi 3: 9 (also Tahdhib 1: 227 [also 9: 86 with variations])– Kafi 6: 232– Ibid. 6: 246– Ibid. 6: 255– Faqih 3: 330)
  - On arbitration: (Kafi 7: 414–15 (two variants))
  - On inheritance: (Saffar: 165– Kafi 7: 77– Ibid. 7: 119– Ibid. 7: 136– Faqih 4: 283(cf. Tahdhib 9: 308) – Ma'ani : 217 (also Tahdhib 9: 211)– Tahdhib 9: 325–6 Numerous other quotations are attributed to a text on the law of inheritance (Sahifatal-fara’id),48 also believed to have been compiled by ‘Ali from the dictation of the Prophet. This was said to be a part of the Book of Ali (Kafi 7: 94 [read fi Kitab ‘Ali as in Tahdhib 9: 271]) with a similar description of its size and shape (Kafi 7: 94–5), or of the Jami'a (Saffar: 145; Kafi 7: 125). Here is a list of citations from this text on the law of inheritance: – Kafi 7: 81 (where two conflicting accounts are given of the arrangement of the text).– Ibid. 7: 93–4 (also Da'a'im 2: 369)– Kafi 7: 98 (also Da'a'im 2: 371)– Kafi 7: 112 (repeated at 113; also Da'a'im 2: 375) – Kafi 7: 126 (see also 7: 125; cf. Saffar: 145 where the passage is cited from the Jami'a)– Da'a'im 2: 370– Ibid. 2: 374– Ibid. 2: 379– Tahdhib 9: 306– Hurr al-‘Amili, Wasa'il 17: 493 (quoting the early fourth-century Shi‘ite author, Ibn Abi 'Aqil))
  - On the penal code: ( Mahasin: 273 (also Kafi 7: 176)– Kafi 7: 201– Ibid. 7: 214 (also 216 with variations)– Ibid. 7: 316–7– Ibid. 7: 313– Ibid. 7: 318– Ibid. 7: 329– Khisal: 539 – Tahdhib 10: 108)
- Ethics (Zayd al-Zarrad: 3–4 (also Ma'ani : 1–2)– ‘Abd Allah b. Ja‘far: 92 – Saffar: 147 – Kafi 1: 41 – Ibid. 2: 71–2 – Ibid. 2: 136 – Ibid. 2: 259 – Ibid. 2: 484 (also 488 with variations) – Ibid. 2: 666 (also Tahdhib 6: 140) – Ibn Hammam: 44 – Irbili 3: 136 There is also a quotation in Husayn b. Sa‘id, Zuhd: 44 on the proper etiquette for the treatment of slaves, ascribed to the “Book of the Messenger of God,” presumably referring to the text in question.)
- Dogmatics and Virues (Fada'il) (Saffar: 166–7 – Mas'udi 5: 82–3 – Khisal: 65–7 – Ibn al-Juham: 466 (also Tusi, Amali 2: 20))
- Tales of the Prophets (‘Ayyashi 1: 27–9 ( fi kitab min kutub ‘Ali; also ‘Ali b. Ibrahim 1: 36–41 [ fı Kitab Amır al-Mu’minı n]; ‘Ilal 1: 100) – ‘Ayyashi 2: 33–4 (also Ali b. Ibrahim 1: 244–5; Ibn Tawus, Sa'd: 238–40 [quoting Ibn 'Uqda's Tafsir]) – ‘Ayyashi 2: 129–36 – ‘Ali b. Ibrahim 1: 32–4 – Ibid. 1: 41 – Kafi 8: 233)
- Esoterics (Saffar: 169 (# 1; cf. # 3 and 7 where the account is ascribed to the Book of Fatima; also Maqatil: 208) – Kamal: 312–13 (also 'Uyun 1: 45–6 [the text is on pp. 40–45]– Shadhan b. Jibril: 141–2 – Manaqib 4: 273 – Dala’il al-imama: 554–62 (also Ibn Tawus, Malahim: 168–71 [quoting a work of Ya‘qub b. Nu‘aym, an early third-century author]))

== See also ==
- List of Shia books
- Al-Jafr (book)
- Al-Jamia
- Bibliography of Ali ibn Abi Talib
