= Al-Jami'a =

Sacred text written by Ali

Al-jāmi'a (Arabic: ٱلْجَامِعَة, lit. 'the inclusive') is a book that Twelver Shias believe was dictated by Muhammad to Ali. Ja'far al-Sadiq refers to it as a scroll (ṣaḥīfa) that is 70 cubits long and was dictated by the Islamic prophet Muhammad and written down by Ali. It is also known as Kitab Ali (lit. Book of Ali) in some sources. It is said that it covers all legal questions, including such details as the blood-money due for a scratch.

== Description ==
Al-Jamia is a scroll made from rams skin which measures 70 cubits long (as measured by the arm of Muhammad) and the width of a sheepskin.

It is believed that the al-Jami'a never ages and that nothing written therein can be erased ("darasa"). And that because Imams have it, they are significantly more knowledgeable about the law than any other experts. Abd Allah ibn Shubruma, a jurist from Kufa who died in 144/761, is thus disparaged by Ja'far al-Sadiq. Similar to this, Ja'far al-Sadiq claims that Abd Allah ibn Al-Hasan, a leader of the rival Shi'i Hasanid branch, only has access to the texts that are available to the rest of the community; he lacks the additional texts that the Imams possess and will not be able to respond to legal questions as a result. There is no need for analogic reasoning (qiys) therefore, according to Shia imams, because the jami'a already has all of the answers. Ja'far al-Sadiq is said to have buried the book when the extremist Shi'i al-Mughīra ibn Sa'īd was crucified in 119 (Hijri)/737-6(Gregorian) on the orders of the Umayyad governor Khalid al-Qasri, an event that al-Sadiq must have perceived as posing a threat to other Shi'is as well. The book, thus, was well guarded against enemies. The Twelver Shia believe that Al-Jamia is currently in the possession of the 12th Imam Muhammad al-Mahdi, after he inherited it from his predecessors.

== Contents ==
The contents of al-Jamia include:

- Details and showing of all the permitted (halal) and sinful things (haraam).
- Legal verdicts.

== See also ==
- Al-Sahifa al-Sajjadiyya
- Book of Ali
- Book of Fatimah
- Mushaf
- Nahj al-Balagha
