= Ali ibn Babawayh Qummi =

Shia scholar, father of Ibn Babawayh (died 939)

- على بن بابُوَیْه قمی

Personal life
- Born: Qom, Iran
- Died: 939 CE

Religious life
- Religion: Islam
- Denomination: Shia
- Jurisprudence: Ja'fari
- Creed: Twelver

Muslim leader
- Influenced by: Muhammad al-Mahdi
- Influenced: al-Shaykh al-Saduq

Ali ibn Babawayh al-Qummi (Persian: علی بن بابویه قمی, romanized: ʿAlī ibn Bābawayh Qummī; Arabic: عَلِيّ بْن بَابَوَيْه ٱلْقُمِيّ, romanized: ʿAlī ibn Bābawayh al-Qummī; died 939) was an Iranian Twelver Shia Muslim scholar from the time of the Ghaybat al-Sughra (Minor Occultation), who was also a companion of Hasan al-Askari (868–874). He's the father of the prominent Shaykh Saduq, whose work Man La Yahduruhu al-Faqih is one of the canonical Four Books of Twelver Shia Islam in hadith.

A prominent scholar in Imami circles, he is famous for having sent a letter to the 12th Imam Muhammad al-Mahdi through his third deputy Ibn Ruh al-Nawbakhti, asking for the Imam's prayer for him to have a child, as the physicians of the time had told him he could not have one. Al-Mahdi's sent back assuring him of his prayer, and informed him he will have two sons. Thus his son, Shaykh Saduq, was always famously called: "Oh you who was born by the prayer of al-Mahdi!".
