= Ilal al-sharayi' =

Ilal al-sharayi' (Arabic: عِلَل الشَّرائِع, literally: reasons of the rulings) is a book by the Shia scholar, Ibn Babawayh (died 991/992). It contains narrations attributed to Muhammad and the Twelve Imams concerning the reasons and explanations for religious rulings, as well as for certain events and actions associated with the prophets and the Imams.

== Content ==
Ilal al-sharayi' presents narrations on the causes and explanations of religious rulings, names, events, beliefs, actions, and the creation of living beings. It also includes explanations for some actions attributed to the prophets, including Muhammad, and the twelve Imams. The work is divided into 647 chapters and was published in two volumes. Several translations have also been published. The narrations are transmitted through multiple narrators from Muhammad and the Ahl al-Bayt. Chapter lengths vary from a few lines to several pages. Examples of chapter titles include:

- The reason wild animals become wild
- The reason for the creation of creatures
- The reason Adam was named Adam
- The reason Eve was named Eve
- The reason God appointed Moses to serve Shuaib
- The reason for the ugliness of some people
- The reason for the abundance of provision for fools
- The reason for old age
- The reason for the emergence of desires
- The reason Muhammad was called ummī
- The reason for the need for prophets
- The reason Muhammad greeted children
- The reason for the legislation of ablution
- The reason for the emergence of winter and summer
