= Twelve Imams =

Line of successors to Muhammad in Shia Islam

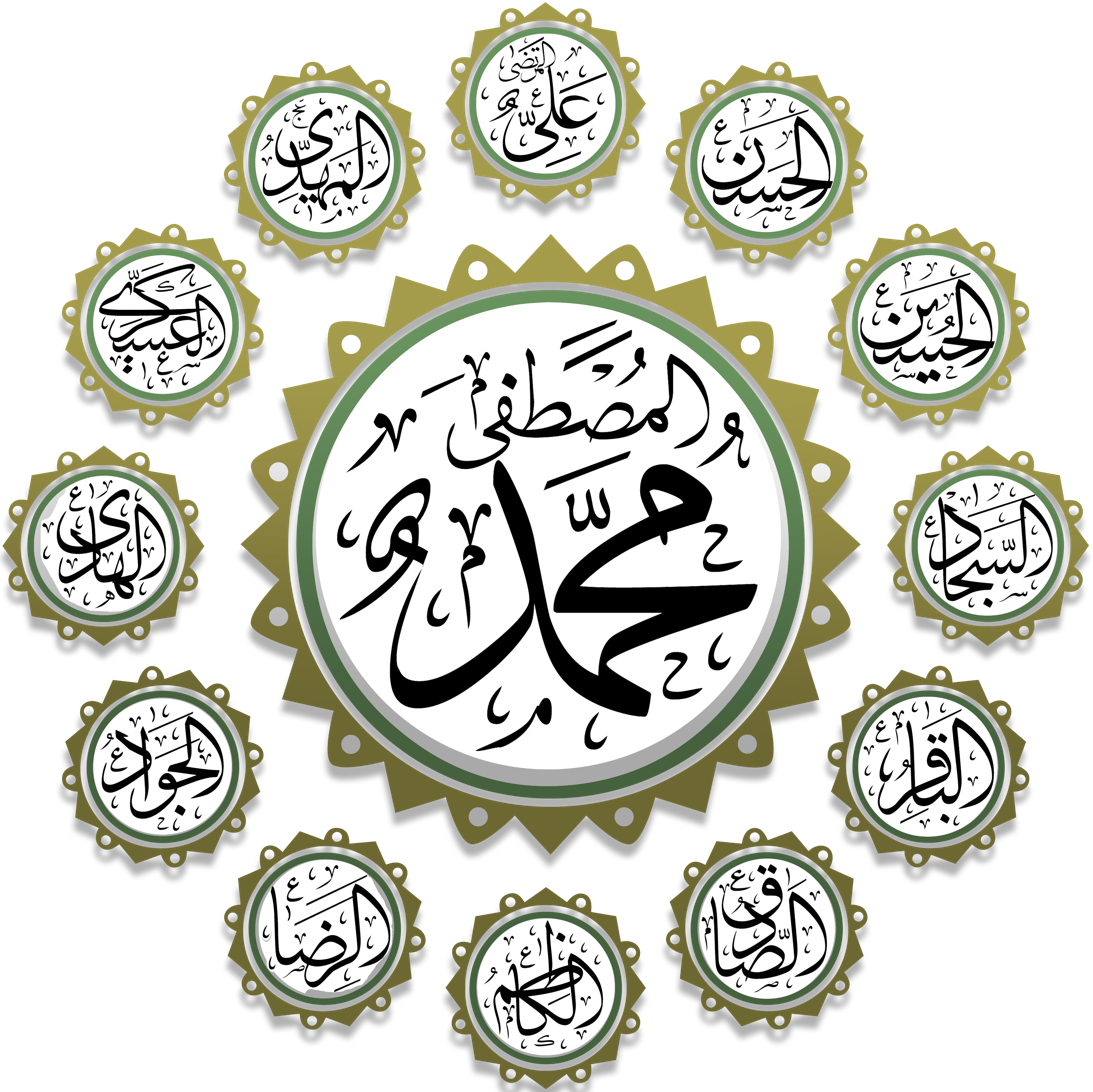
Depiction of the Twelve Imams with Prophet Muhammad

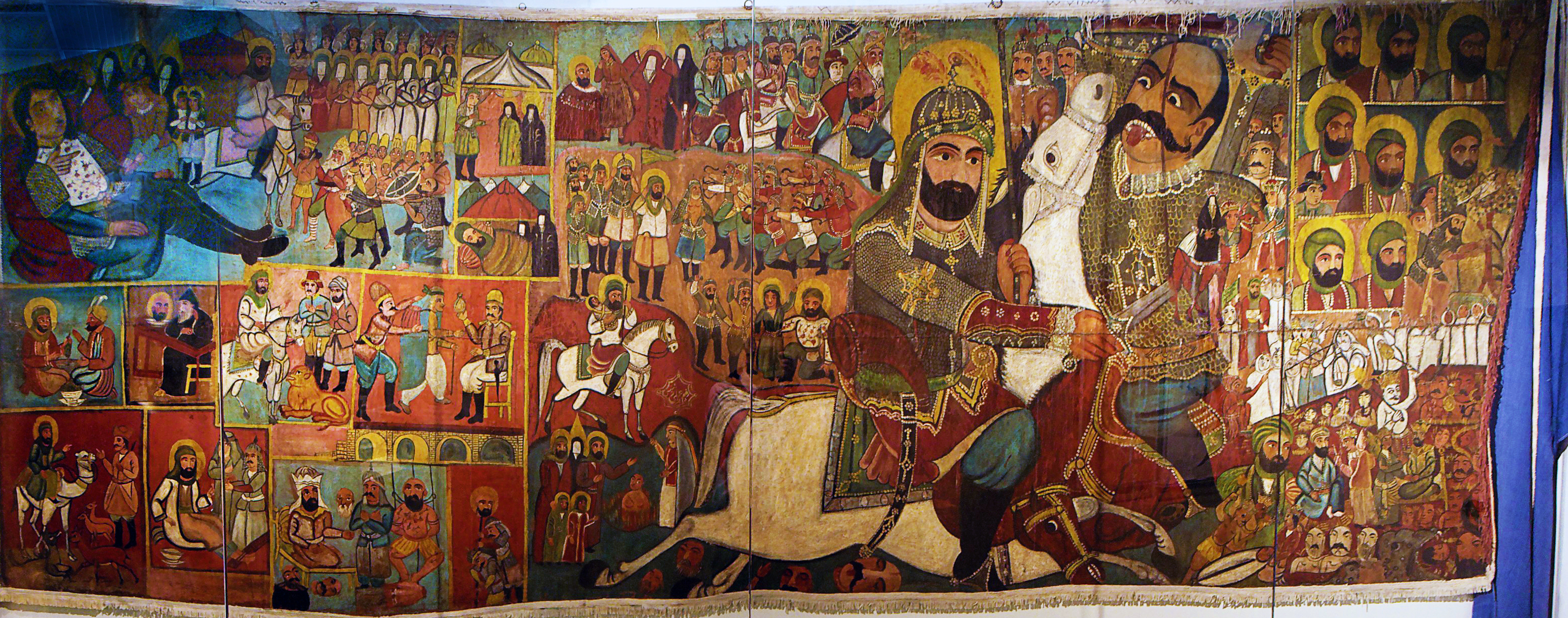
19th century Iranian artwork depicting all twelve Imams and some episodes from their lives and the Shiites being rewarded on the coming Day of Resurrection

The Twelve Imams (Arabic: ٱلْأَئِمَّة ٱلْٱثْنَا عَشَر, al-ʾAʾimmah al-ʾIthnā ʿAšar; Persian: دوازده امام, Davâzdah Emâm),Urdu: بارہ امام are the spiritual and political successors to the Islamic prophet Muhammad in the Twelver branch of Shia Islam, including that of the Alawite and Alevi.

According to Twelver theology, the Twelve Imams are exemplary human individuals who not only rule over the community with justice, but also are able to keep and interpret sharia and the esoteric meaning of the Quran. The words and deeds of Muhammad and the imams are a guide and model for the community to follow; as a result, they must be free from error and sin (known as ismah, or infallibility) and must be chosen by divine decree through Muhammad.

== Imamah ==
It is believed in Twelver Shi’ism that the Islamic Prophet Muhammad and his household are infallible, possessing Hikmah. Their oppression and suffering served greater purposes and were a means of divine grace to their devotees. The Imams are also guided by preserved texts in their possession, such as al-Jafr, al-Jamia, and unaltered past books the Torah and Gospel. Imamat, or belief in the divine guide, is a fundamental belief in the Twelver Shia doctrine and is based on the concept that God would not leave humanity without access to divine guidance.

According to Twelvers, there is at all times an Imam of the era who is the divinely appointed authority on all matters of faith and law in the Muslim community. Ali, a cousin and son-in-law of Muhammad, was the first of the Twelve Imams, and, in the Twelvers view, the rightful successor to Muhammad, followed by male descendants of Muhammad through his daughter Fatimah. Each Imam was the son of the previous Imam, with the exception of Al-Husayn, who was the brother of Al-Hasan. The twelfth and final Imam is Muhammad al-Mahdi, who is believed by the Twelvers to be currently alive, and hidden in the Major Occultation until he returns to bring justice to the world. It is believed by Twelver and Alevi Muslims that the Twelve Imams have been foretold in the Hadith of the 12 accomplishers. All of the Imams were assassinated, with the exception of the last Imam who, according to Twelver and Alevi belief, is living in occultation.

Some of the Imams also have a leading role within some Sufi orders and are seen as the spiritual heads of Islam, because most of the Silsila (spiritual chain) of Sufi orders leads back to Muhammad through one of the Twelve Imams.

== List ==
Number	Name Kunya	Arabic title Persian title Turkish title	Lived (CE) Lived (AH)	Age when assumed Imamat	Age at death	Duration of Imamat	Importance	Reason & place of death Place of burial
1	Ali ibn Abi Talib ٱلْإِمَام عَلِيّ ٱبْن أَبِي طَالِب Abu al-Hasan أَبُو ٱلْحَسَن	ʾAmīr al-Muʾminīn (أَمِير ٱلْمُؤْمِنِين) (Commander of the Faithful); al-Murtaḍā (ٱلْمُرْتَضَىٰ) (The Beloved); al-Waṣīy (ٱلْوَصِيّ) (The Successor); al-Walīy (ٱلْوَلِيّ) (The Wali); al-Haydar (حيدر) (The Lion); Sheer-e-Khuda (شیر خدا) (The Lion of God); Shah-e-Mardan (شاه مردان) (The King of the Brave); Birinci Ali (First Ali)	599–661 23 (before Hijra)–40	33	61	28	Cousin and son-in-law of Muhammad. According to Twelver Shia belief, he was the only person to have been born in the Ka'bah, the holiest site in Islam, and the first male to openly accept Islam. Considered by Shia Islam as the rightful Successor of Muhammad. Sunnis also acknowledge him as the fourth Caliph. He holds a high position in almost all Sufi tariqa (religious orders); members of these orders trace their lineage to Muhammad through Ali.	Assassinated by Abd al-Rahman ibn Muljam, a Kharijite, in Kufa, Iraq, who struck his head with a poisoned sword while he was in prostration praying on the Night of Qadr in the month of Ramadan. Buried at the Imam Ali Mosque in Najaf, Iraq, 10 kilometres (6.2 mi) southwest of the place of his assassination in Kufa.
2	Hasan ibn Ali ٱلْإِمَام ٱلْحَسَن ٱبْن عَلِيّ Abu Muhammad أَبُو مُحَمَّد	al-Mujtabā (ٱلْمُجْتَبَىٰ) (The Chosen); Sibṭ an-Nabīy (سِبْط ٱلنَّبِيّ) (Grandchild of the Prophet); İkinci Ali (Second Ali)	625–670 3–50	39	47	8	He was the eldest surviving grandson of Muhammad through Muhammad's daughter, Fatimah az-Zahra. Hasan succeeded his father as the caliph in Kufa, and on the basis of a peace treaty with Muawiyah, he relinquished control of Iraq following a Caliphate of seven months.	Poisoned by his wife in Madinah on the orders of the Caliph Muawiyah (Shia view). Buried in Jannat al-Baqi, Medina, Saudi Arabia.
3	Husayn ibn Ali ٱلْإِمَام ٱلْحُسَيْن ٱبْن عَلِيّ Abu Abdillah أَبُو عَبْد ٱللَّٰه	Sayyid ash-Shuhadāʾ (سَيِّد ٱلشُّهَدَاء) (Master of the Martyrs); al-Maẓlūm (ٱلْمَظْلُوم) (The Tyrannized); Sibṭ an-Nabīy (سِبْط ٱلنَّبِيّ) (Grandchild of the Prophet); Üçüncü Ali (Third Ali)	626–680 4–61	46	57	11	He was a grandson of Muhammad and brother of Hasan ibn Ali. Husayn opposed the validity of Yazid ibn Muawiyah. As a result, he, his family and his companions were later killed in the Battle of Karbala by Yazid's forces. After this incident, the commemoration of Husayn ibn Ali has become central to Shia identity.	Killed and beheaded at the Battle of Karbala. Buried at the Imam Husayn Shrine in Karbala, Iraq.
4	Ali ibn Husayn ٱلْإِمَام عَلِيّ ٱبْن ٱلْحُسَيْن ٱلسَّجَّاد Abu Muhammad أَبُو مُحَمَّد	as-Sajjād (ٱلسَّجَّاد) (The Consistently Prostrating); Zayn al-ʿĀbidīn (زَيْن ٱلْعَابِدِين) (Ornament of the Worshippers); Dördüncü Ali (Fourth Ali)	658/9 – 712 38–95	23	57	34	Author of prayers in Sahifa al-Sajjadiyya, which is known as "The Psalm of the Household of the Prophet." He survived the Battle of Karbala because he was told not to participate due to a debilitating illness.	He was poisoned on the order of Caliph al-Walid I in Madinah. Buried in Jannat al-Baqi, Medina, Saudi Arabia.
5	Muhammad ibn Ali ٱلْإِمَام مُحَمَّد ٱبْن عَلِيّ ٱلْبَاقِر Abu Ja'far أَبُو جَعْفَر	Bāqir al-ʿUlūm (بَاقِر ٱلْعُلُوم) (The Opener of Knowledge); Beşinci Ali (Fifth Ali)	677–732 57–114	38	57	19	Sunni and Shia sources both describe him as one of the early and most eminent legal scholars, teaching many students during his tenure.	He was poisoned by Ibrahim ibn Walid ibn 'Abdallah in Madinah on the order of Caliph Hisham ibn Abd al-Malik. Buried in Jannat al-Baqi, Medina, Saudi Arabia.
6	Ja'far ibn Muhammad ٱلْإِمَام جَعْفَر ٱبْن مُحَمَّد ٱلصَّادِق Abu Abdillah أَبُو عَبْد ٱللَّٰه	aṣ-Ṣādiq (ٱلصَّادِق) (The Honest); Altıncı Ali (Sixth Ali)	702–765 83–148	31	65	34	Established the Ja'fari jurisprudence and developed the theology of Twelvers. He instructed many scholars in different fields, including Imams Abu Hanifah and Malik ibn Anas in fiqh, Wasil ibn Ata and Hisham ibn Hakam in Islamic theology, and Jabir ibn Hayyan in science and alchemy.	He was poisoned in Madinah on the order of Caliph Al-Mansur. Buried in Jannat al-Baqi, Medina, Saudi Arabia.
7	Musa ibn Ja'far ٱلْإِمَام مُوسَىٰ ٱبْن جَعْفَر ٱلْكَاظِم Abu al-Hasan I أَبُو ٱلْحَسَن ٱلْأَوَّل	al-Kāẓim (ٱلْكَاظِم) (The Confined); al-Sābįr (اَلصَابِرٌ) ("The Patient One"); Yedinci Ali (Seventh Ali)	744–799 128–183	20	55	35	Leader of the Shia community during the schism of Ismailis, and other branches such as Waqifis, after the death of the former Imam, Jafar al-Sadiq. He established the network of agents who collected khums in the Shia community of the Middle East and the Greater Khorasan. He holds a high position with the Mahdavia; the members of these orders trace their lineage to Muhammad through him.	Imprisoned and poisoned in Baghdad, Iraq on the order of Caliph Harun al-Rashid. Buried in the Al-Kazimiyah Mosque in Baghdad, Iraq.
8	Ali ibn Musa ٱلْإِمَام عَلِيّ ٱبْن مُوسَىٰ ٱلرِّضَا Abu al-Hasan II أَبُو ٱلْحَسَن ٱلثَّانِي	ar-Riḍā (ٱلرِّضَا) (The Pleasing); Sekizinci Ali (Eighth Ali)	765–817 148–203	35	55	20	Made crown-prince by Caliph Al-Ma'mun, and famous for his discussions with both Muslim and non-Muslim religious scholars.	He was poisoned in Mashad, Iran on the order of Caliph Al-Ma'mun. Buried in the Imam Rida Mosque in Mashad, Iran.
9	Muhammad al-Jawad ٱلْإِمَام مُحَمَّد ٱبْن عَلِيّ ٱلْجَوَّاد Abu Ja'far أَبُو جَعْفَر	al-Jawwād (ٱلْجَوَّاد) (The Generous); at-Taqīy (ٱلتَّقِيّ) (The God-Fearing); Dokuzuncu Ali (Ninth Ali)	810–835 195–220	8	25	17	Famous for his generosity and piety in the face of persecution by the Abbasid caliphate.	Poisoned by his wife, Al-Ma'mun's daughter, in Baghdad, Iraq on the order of Caliph Al-Mu'tasim. Buried in the Al-Kazimiyah Mosque in Baghdad, Iraq.
10	Ali ibn Muhammad ٱلْإِمَام عَلِيّ ٱبْن مُحَمَّد ٱلْهَادِي Abu al-Hasan III أَبُو ٱلْحَسَن ٱلثَّالِث	al-Hādī (ٱلْهَادِي) (The Guide); an-Naqīy (ٱلنَّقِيّ) (The Pure); Onuncu Ali (Tenth Ali)	827–868 212–254	8	42	34	Strengthened the network of deputies in the Shia community. He sent them instructions, and received in turn financial contributions of the faithful from the khums and religious vows.	He was poisoned in Samarra, Iraq on the order of Caliph Al-Mu'tazz. Buried in the Al Askari Mosque in Samarra, Iraq.
11	Hasan ibn Ali ٱلْإِمَام ٱلْحَسَن ٱبْن عَلِيّ ٱلْعَسْكَرِيّ Abu al-Mahdi أَبُو ٱلْمَهْدِيّ	al-ʿAskarīy (ٱلْعَسْكَرِيّ) (The Garrison Town One); Onbirinci Ali (Eleventh Ali)	846–874 232–260	22	28	6	For most of his life, the Abbasid Caliph, Al-Mu'tamid, placed restrictions on him after the death of his father. Repression of the Shia population was particularly high at the time due to their large size and growing power.	He was poisoned on the order of Caliph Al-Mu'tamid in Samarra, Iraq. Buried in Al-Askari Mosque in Samarra, Iraq.
12	Hujjat Allah ibn al-Hasan ٱلْإِمَام حُجَّة ٱللَّٰه ٱبْن ٱلْحَسَن ٱلْمَهْدِيّ Abu al-Qasim أَبُو ٱلْقَاسِم	al-Mahdīy (ٱلْمَهْدِيّ) (The Guided); al-Qāʾim (ٱلْقَائِم) (The Riser); al-Ghāʾib (ٱلْغَائِب) (The Hidden); Baqīyat Allah (بَقِيَّة ٱللَّٰه) (Remainder of Allah's); al-Ḥujjah ʾĀl Muḥammad (ٱلْحُجَّة مِن آل مُحَمَّد) (The Proof of the House of Muhammad); Wali al-‘Asr (ولي العصر (the guardian of the age); Onikinci Ali (Twelfth Ali)	869–present 255–present	5	Alive	present	According to Twelver Shia doctrine, he is the current Imam and the promised Mahdi, a messianic figure who will return with the Prophet Isa (Jesus). He will reestablish the rightful governance of Islam and establish justice and peace in the whole earth.	According to Twelver Shia doctrine, he has been living in the Occultation since 874, and will continue as long as God wills.

== See also ==
- Ahl al-Kisa
- Succession to Muhammad
- Hadith of the twelve successors
- The Fourteen Infallibles
- Salawat
- Sayyidat Nisa' al-Alamin
- Hadith of Jabir
