= Waqifite Shia =

The Waqifite Shia were a Shia sect who accepted the Imamate of Musa al-Kazim, but refused to accept the Imamate of his successor Ali al-Rida. The sect gradually disappeared in the decades that followed.

== Beliefs ==
The Waqifites believed in the Mahdi and the Occultation of Imam Musa al-Kazim. They believed Musa was alive, did not die, and would never die, that he was raised to heaven just as Jesus was raised, and that he was the awaited one who would fill the world with justice and fairness as it was filled with oppression and tyranny. However, they later differed amongst themselves concerning Musa’s death and split into four sub-groups. Three of the sub-groups believed that Musa had died, while the other remaining subgroup persistently denied that Musa al-Kadhim had died.

== Reasons for the creation of the Waqifites’ beliefs ==
The most probable reason for the creation of the Waqifites’ beliefs is that when Musa al-Kadhim, was in the prison of the Abbasid Caliph Harun al-Rashid, he appointed some agents on his behalf in order to collect the legal monetary rights from his Shï‘ites. These agents included Ziyad ibn Marwan al-Qandi and ‘Ali ibn Abu Hamza (in Kufa), who collected funds of 70,000 and 30,000 dinars respectively. Other such agents included `Uthman ibn `Isa al-Rawasi (in Egypt), and Hayyan and al-Sarraj (in Kufa). When Musa died, these agents bought country estates and houses from the money they had collected on behalf of Musa. When Ali ar-Ridha demanded that they give the money to him (as the rightful successor of his father Musa), they refused to hand it over to him, since they denied that Musa ever died. Therefore, these agents denied Musa’s death and rejected Ali ar-Ridha’s Imamate in order that they would have an excuse for not returning the money. Such agents then spread the Waqifites’ beliefs by lavishly spending money in order to buy the minds of the people.

The other (less probable) reason for the creation of the Waqifites’ beliefs is that Musa’s father, Ja'far al-Sadiq (the 6th Imam), reported many traditions concerning the occultation and the rise of al-Qa'im, but did not indicate explicitly which of his descendants would be al-Qa'im. Therefore, a considerable number of the muhaddithun thought that Ja'far al-Sadiq had indicated his son Musa and hence stopped at him, contending that he was the Mahdi and was in a state of occultation.

== Extinction of the sect ==
The Waqifites continued in their beliefs for a long time, but decreased in number with the passage of time, until the death of the theory and the extinction of those who believed in it. The extinction of the sect was especially hastened when Imam Ali ar-Ridha (who himself faced many difficulties in proving his own right to the Imamate, not only to his father's prominent followers, but also to his brother Ahmad) confirmed the death of his father and said to the Waqifites:

“Allah’s evidence on His creation will be only through the Imam that is alive, and is well-known. Glory be to Allah. The Messenger of Allah died and Musa bin Ja’far did not die? Yes, by Allah he has died, and his wealth has been distributed and his slave girls have been married.”

He suspected those who claimed that his father did not die, of lying and said:

“They are disbelievers in what Allah the Exalted has revealed on Muhammad. If Allah exalted were to extend the lifespan of anyone due to the need of the creation to him, He would have extended the lifespan of the Messenger of Allah.”

== Prominent Waqifite personalities ==
Some of the eminent figures and leaders of the Waqifites included: Muhammad ibn al-Hasan ibn Shammun, Ali Ibn Abu Hamza, al-Husayn ibn Mahran, and Ibn Abu Sa‘ïd. Another eminent person attributed to the Waqifites was Yazid ibn Khalifa al-Harithi, who was regarded as one of the companions of Ja'far al-Sadiq (who reportedly praised him).

== Books written by the Waqifites ==
'Ali ibn al-Hasan al-Ta'i al-Tatari (a companion of Musa al-Kadhim) named Musa al-Kadhim as the hidden Imam. In defense of his view he wrote Kitab al-Ghayba, which became the framework for the works of later Waqifite authors on the issue of al-Ghayba (the occultation). One such author was al-Hasan ibn Muhammad ibn Suma`a (d. 263 A.H. / 877 C.E.), the Waqifite student of al-Ta'i al-Tatari. The information in the book he composed was later used by Twelver Shia who lived during the period from 260–329 A.H. / 874-940-1 C.E., like al-Hasan al-Saffar (d. 292 A.H. / 904 C.E.) and Muhammad ibn Ya'qub al-Kulayni, to support their claim that the hidden Imam was not the 7th Imam (i.e. Musa al-Kadhim), but rather the 12th Imam (i.e. Muhammad al-Mahdi).

== See also ==
- Islamic schools and branches
- List of extinct Shia sects
