= Ibn Babawayh =

Shia Islamic scholar (c. 923–991)

Ibn Babawayh ابْنُ بَابَوَيْه
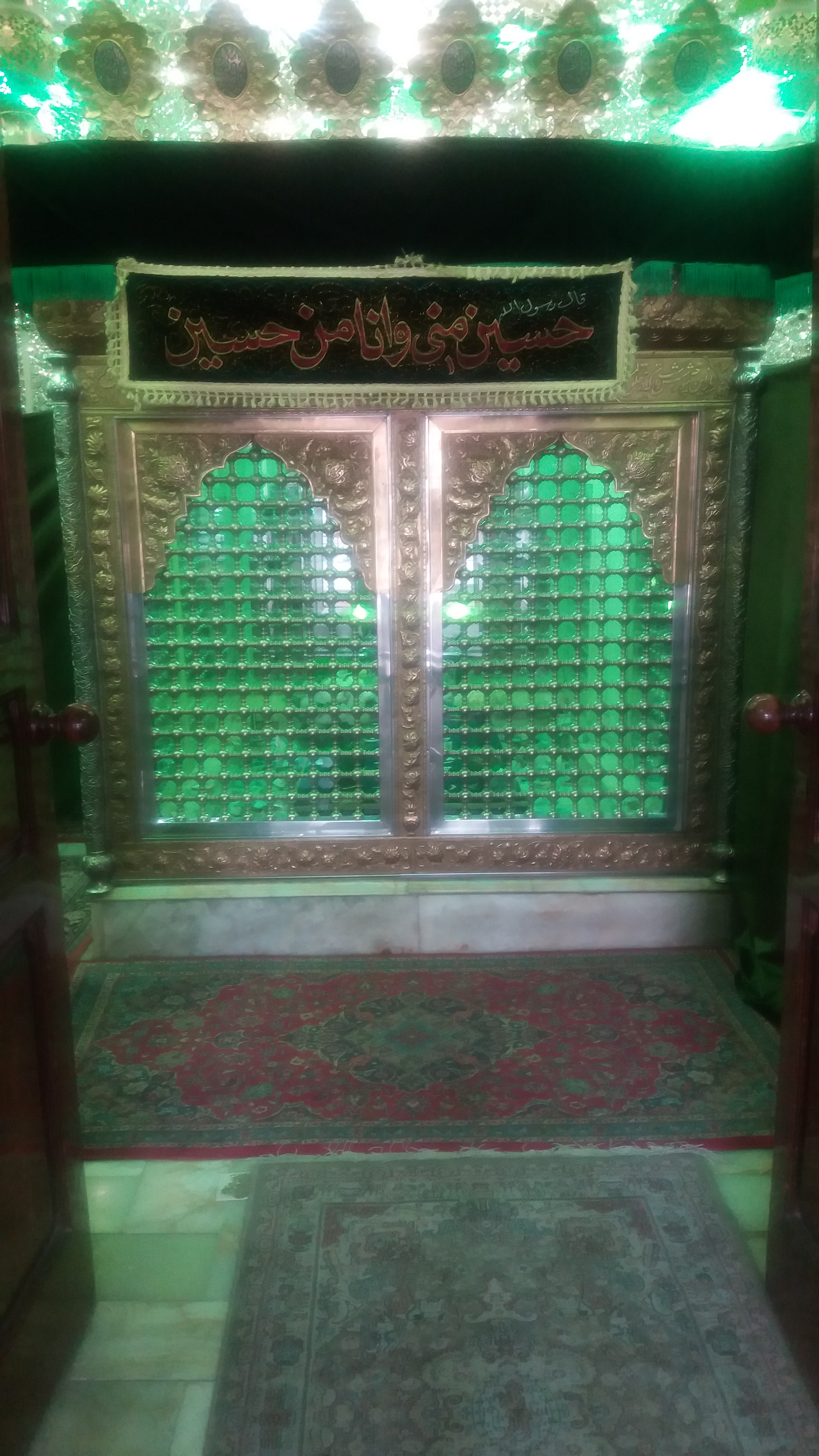
- Zarih inside the tomb of Ibn Babawayh in Ibn Babawayh Cemetery, Rey, Iran
- Title: Al-Shaykh Al-Saduq ٱلشَّيْخ ٱلصَّدُوق

Personal life
- Born: Muhammad c. 923 AD / 310 A.H. Khorasan province
- Died: 991 AD / 380 A.H. (aged c. 68) Rey
- Resting place: Ray, Tehran, Iran
- Era: Islamic golden age
- Main interest(s): Fiqh and Hadith
- Notable work: Man la yahduruhu al-Faqih
- Other name: Ibn Babawayh

Religious life
- Religion: Islam
- Denomination: Shia
- Sect: Twelver

Muslim leader
- Influenced by: Muhammad ibn Ya'qub al-Kulayni
- Influenced: Shaykh al-Mufid

Ibn Babawayh (Arabic: ابْنُ بَابَوَيْه), also known as al-Shaykh al-Saduq (Persian: شیخ صدوق Arabic: ٱلشَّيْخ ٱلصَّدُوق, lit. 'the truthful scholar'), was a prominent ninth-century Twelver Shia scholar, theologian, and hadith compiler of Persian descent. He is regarded as one of the most important scholars in the formative period of Twelver Shia Islam and is particularly known for his extensive work on Shia hadith and theology. His full name was Abu Ja'far Muhammad ibn Ali ibn al-Husayn ibn Musa ibn Babawayh al-Qomi. He was born in Qom in the early tenth century, into a prominent family of Shia scholars. His father, Ali ibn al-Husayn ibn Babawayh al-Qomi, was himself a leading Shia jurist and hadith scholar. Al-Saduq studied under his father and other scholars in Qom before traveling extensively throughout the Islamic world in search of knowledge and hadith traditions.

Al-Saduq lived during the Minor Occultation of the twelfth Imam, Muhammad al-Mahdi. He is traditionally reported to have received a letter of supplication from the Mahdi through his father. He later became one of the leading transmitters of the doctrines of Twelver Shia Islam, particularly the doctrines of the Imamate, the occultation, and the resurrection. His most famous work is the Man La Yahduruhu al-Faqih, one of the four canonical collections of hadith in Twelver Shia Islam. The work contains traditions concerning Islamic law, ritual practice, ethics, and other religious matters. Another important work by al-Saduq is Uyūn Akhbār al-Riḍā, a major Shia collection of traditions about the eighth Imam, Ali al-Rida, including his sayings, teachings, debates, virtues, and life. Al-Saduq died in Ray around 991 AD and was buried there. He is remembered in Shia Islam as one of the major scholars of the early period of Shia hadith scholarship, alongside figures such as al-Kulayni and al-Shaykh al-Mufid.

== Life ==
His patronymic, Ibn Babawayh indicates a Persian origin, as Babawayh is an Arabic form of the Persian name Babuyah. For some length of time, unknown, the family had been devout adherents of Shia Islam. Ibn Babawayh's father, Ali ibn Babawayh Qummi (d. 939 CE) was a leading figure among the Islamic scholars of Qom.

=== Birth ===
The exact date of Ibn Babawayh's birth is not known. Shia scholars consider his birth to be after the year 305 A.H. (probably 306 A.H.) He was born and raised in Qom, a town about 125 kilometres (78 mi) south west of Tehran in modern-day Iran. His birth is considered a miracle as he was born after the twelfth Shia Imam, al-Mahdi's, supplications. Ibn Babawayh was educated by his father, Ali ibn Babawayh. He was taught by local scholars of Shia Islam. Qom was a center of study of Shia traditions and it was this form of religious learning to which Ibn Babawayh adhered.

=== Middle years ===
In 966 CE, Ibn Babawayh left Qom for Baghdad. He travelled widely, learning about the tradition of Islam. Ibn Babawayh later emphasized the importance of tradition over speculative theology. His works reflect this interest in traditions and nearly all of them take the form of compilations of traditions. However, Ibn Babawayh did write a creed of Shia Islam al-I'tiqadat. His pupil, the al-Shaykh al-Mufid, revised this creed in Tashih al-I'tiqad, critiquing several points.

=== Works ===
Ibn Babawayh was a prolific scholar. Muhammad ibn Al-Hasan al-Tusi (d. 1067 CE) numbered Ibn Babawayh's works at over 300 but counted only 43 in his immediate possession. al-Najashi (d. 1058 AD) listed 193 works but does not mention Ibn Babawayh's sentinel work, Man la yahduruhu al-faqih. Many of Ibn Babawayh's works are considered lost but some do survive. Some have been published and others survive in manuscript form.

=== Later years ===
During the last years of his life al Shaykh al-Saduq lived in Ray. He had been invited there by Rukn al-Dawla of the Buyid family. Although he was treated well, his teaching was then restricted by the Buyid family wazir (official), ibn 'Abbad. The attack appears to have been aimed at traditionalists in general as several Sunni traditionists suffered similar restrictions.

=== Death ===
Ibn Babawayh died in Ray in 381 A.H. (991 CE). He was likely more than 70 years old at the time of his death. He is buried at Ebn-e Babooyeh in Persia (modern-day Iran).

== Man La Yahduruhu al-Faqih ==
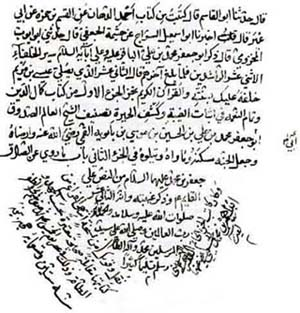
The Kamāl al-Dīn wa Tamām al-Niʻmah (the perfection of the religion and the end of the blessings) manuscript

Man La Yahduruhu al-Faqih (lit. For Him Who is Not in the Presence of a Jurisprudent or When No Theologian is Present) a component of the group of four major books about the traditions of Shi'ite Islam. Despite the fact that many of Ibn Babawayh's other works are extremely important, this book is probably the most famous of his extant writings. However, some authorities maintain that there were five major books of traditions that included another of Ibn Babawayh's works, Madinat al-'ilm. Al-Tusi mentions that the latter work was bigger than Man la yahduruhu al-faqih but may no longer exist. Madinat al-'ilm was likely concerned with al-din (the principles of religion) rather than furu', the practical regulations for carrying out the shari'a (Islamic law).

=== Purpose ===
Man la yahduruhu al-Faqih (lit. For Him Who is Not in the Presence of a Jurisprudent) is concerned with furu' (Jurisprudence). The title has been neatly translated by Edward Granville Browne as "Every man his own lawyer". In his introduction to the book, Ibn Babawayh explains the circumstances of its composition and the reason for its title. When he was at Ilaq near Balkh, he met Sharif al-Din Abu 'Abd Allah. Ibn Babawayh was delighted with Sharif al-Din Abu 'Abd Allah's discourses with him and his gentleness, kindness, dignity and interest in religion. Sharif al-Din Abu 'Abd Allah showed Ibn Babawayh a book compiled by Muhammad ibn Zakariya al-Razi entitled Man la yahduruhu al-Tabib or "Every man his own doctor". Sharif al-Din Abu 'Abd Allah, then asked Ibn Babawayh to compile a similar work of reference on Fiqh (jurisprudence), al-halal wa al-haram (the permitted and prohibited), and al-shara-i' wa-'l-ahkam (revealed law and ordinary laws).

Man la yahduruh al-faqih represents a synopsis of all the traditions that Ibn Babawayh had collected, while his prior works, for example, Kitab al-nikah (the book of marriage) and Kitab al-hajj (the book of pilgrimage) are each a treatise on different aspect of furu'. Further, Man la yahduruhu al-Faqih was intended as a reference for the ordinary man in that the Isnads are not recorded. The isnads are the chain of authorities through which the traditions were received from the Prophet or one of the Imams. In the science of traditions, this providence is all important. A scholar would expect the isnads to be present for examination.

Ibn Babawayh said he wrote the synopsis:

"... because I found it appropriate to do so. I compiled the book without isnads (asanid) so that the chains (of authority) should not be too many (-and make the book too long-) and so that the book's advantages might be abundant. I did not have the usual intention of compilers (of books of traditions) to put forward everything which they (could) narrate but my intention was to put forward those things by which I gave legal opinions and which I judged to be correct.

=== Contents ===
Ibn Babawayh not only records the traditions but also gives interpretation. For instance, in a summary of the various traditions of the pilgrimage, he gives a long outline of all the rituals which should be performed by the faithful, with very few traditions interrupting his description. The book is not arranged in kutub (chapters) but in abwab (sections).

=== Sources ===
In Man la yahduruhu al-faqih, Babawayh discusses his sources. These include the works of Hariz ibn 'Abd Allah al-Sijistani and 'Ubaid Allah ibn 'Ali al-Halabi who were contemporaries of the Imam Ja'far al-Sadiq. They also included the works of Ali ibn Mahziyar; al-Husayn ibn Sa'id; and Ahmad ibn Muhammad ibn 'Isa (died 297 A.H.) who all heard the traditions of the Imams Ali Al-Ridha, Muhammad al-Jawad and al-Hadi. Other sources were the works of Muhammad ibn Yahya ibn 'Imran al-Ash'ari, Sa'd ibn 'Abd Allah (died about 300 A.H.) and Muhammad ibn al-Hasan (died 343 A.H.) Ibn Babawayh was taught by the latter. The sources also included the works of Muhammad b. Abi 'Umayr (died 218 A.H.), Ahmad ibn Abi 'Abd Allah al-Barqi (died in 274 or 280 A.H.) and the Risala which Ibn Babawayh's father had written to him. Ibn Babawayh also cites his own works.

=== Critiques ===
Man la yahduruhu al-faqih' has been the subject of many critiques. These include commentaries by Zain al-'Abidin al-'Alawi al-'Amili (died 1060 A.H.) and Muhammad Taqi al-Majlisi al-Awwal (died 1070 A H ).

== Other works ==
- Kamal al-din wa tamam al-ni'mah meaning "the perfection of the religion and the end of the blessings" is about Mahdi, the prophesied redeemer. It includes questions and answers about The Occultation, the event when the Mahdi appears.
- Ma'ani al-Akhbar explains the complexities of traditions and the Quranic verses.
- Oyoun Akhbar Al-Ridha, dedicated to Ibn-e Ebad, the minister of the Buyid family, includes some of the Imam Rida's traditions.
- Al-Khisal is about moral instruction and their scientific, historical and legal origins.
- Al-Amali is a collection of Ibn Babawayh's lectures. Al-Amali was translated into English by Sayed Athar Husain Rizvi and Lantern Publications published a bilingual version of al-Amali. https://lanternpublications.com/books/History/Al_amaali_Saduq
- Ilal al-shara'i (meaning "the cause of situations") explores the philosophy of the Islamic ordinances.
- Eʿteqādātal-Emāmīya (meaning "creeds of Shia") presents a summary of the core tenets of the Shi'ite creed.
- Man la yahduruhu al-faqih, Ilal Al-Shara'i, Kamal al-din, Al-Khisal, Ma'ani al-Akhbar, Al-Tauheed and Sawab ul Amal wa Aqab ul Amal have been translated in Urdu language by Al-Kisa Publishers.

== See also ==
- Ibn Babawayh Cemetery
- Shaykh Mufid
- Shaykh Murtaza
- Syed Razi
