= Hossein Modarressi =

Iranian Islamic studies scholar

- حسين مدرسى طباطبايى

Personal life
- Born: Qom, Iran
- Main interest(s): Shīʿa theology, Shia view of Muslim history, See below more

Religious life
- Religion: Shia Islam
- Jurisprudence: Ja'fari/Akhbari

Hossein Modarressi Tabataba'i (Persian: حسين مدرسى طباطبايى; born 1952 or 1942) is a leading Muslim jurist and professor of law.

== Early life ==
He attended the Islamic seminary at Qom where he received a complete traditional Islamic education in Islamic philosophy, theology and law, ending with a certificate of ijtihad, the highest degree in Islamic religious tradition. He also taught there for many years before pursuing his secular education which ended in 1982 with a D. Phil. from Oxford University. He has been a professor at Princeton University since 1983 where he is Bayard Dodge Professor of Near Eastern Studies. He has simultaneously been Golestaneh Fellow at St Antony's College, Oxford since 1988, and a Senior Research Scholar at the School of International and Public Affairs of Columbia University since 1990. He has also occasionally taught at other institutions such as Ecole des hautes etudes en sciences sociales in Paris, Yale Law School and Harvard where he was the Custodian of the Two Holy Mosques Visiting Professor of Law at Harvard Law School in 2007.

== Works ==
He is a prolific author of some thirty books and many articles in English, Arabic and Persian. His books in English include Kharaj in Islamic Law (London 1983), An Introduction to Shi'i Law (London 1984), Crisis and Consolidation in the Formative Period of Shi'ite Islam (Princeton, 1993), and Tradition and Survival, a Bibliographical Survey of Early Shi'ite Literature (Oxford, 2003).
