= Seyyed Hassani =

In Shia Islam, Hassani (Arabic/Persian: سید حسني), is a Sayyid (young man) whose rising is predicted to be among the signs of the reappearance of al-Mahdi. Seyyed Hassani will come out from the side of Deilam (Gilan and the west of Mazandaran).

According to—Islamic—narrations: whereas he shouts loudly "(you) help Imam-Mahdi", gallant and great-hearted men will assist him. Seyyed Hassani will remove the Earth from the existence of oppressors and Kafirs, from his place till Kufa. This progress is done simultaneously with coming out of al-Mahdi from Mecca—that al-Mahdi comes to Kufa (from Mecca), and he will be join al-Mahdi.

== Descent ==
Hassani (who has been described as a good-looking young man) is from the offspring (descents) of the second Imam of Shia Islam, Hasan ibn Ali, and presumably that's why he is named as Seyyed Hassani.

== Nafse Zakiyyah ==
According to a part of Ulema (scholars): probably, "Hassani" is the same Nafs-e-Zakiyyah which is among the definite signs of Dhuhur.

== Murder ==
Seyyed Hassani who will give allegiance with al-Mahdi, will eventually be killed in Mecca.

== See also ==
- Mahdi
- Sufyani
- Al-Yamani
- The Occultation
- Khasf al-Bayda'
- Nafs-e-Zakiyyah
- Seyed Khorasani
- Voice from heaven
- Reappearance of Muhammad al-Mahdi
- Signs of the reappearance of Muhammad al-Mahdi
