= Shu'ayb bin Salih =

Prophetic figure in Shia Islam

Shu'ayb bin Salih (Persian: شعیب بن صالح) or Saleh ibn Shu'ayb(or Shuaib bin Salih) is prophesied to rebel before the al-Mahdi's reappearance and his uprising is among the signs of the reappearance of the twelfth and final Imam of Shia Islam, the Mahdi according to some Islamic narrations.

== Characteristics ==
According to Islamic narrations, Shuaib bin Salih has been described as "a light-brown-skin young man with a low beard or with a beard that is longer at the chin; and is regarded from Banu-Tamim or one of their servants. Shuaib's soldiers number is said to be 4,000, and he is described as the commander of a (Khorasani) individual resurrection who is from Banu Hashim.

== Uprising ==
According to hadiths, the commencement of the uprising (from Khorasan) will be led by Shu'ayb ibn Salih. The uprising of him is pondered to be run from Rey (Tehran), Samarkand, Nishapur, or Taleqan. It has also mentioned that: Shuaib bin Salih's soldiers hold black flags, wearing black cummerbunds (belts) and also black pants and shoes and white dresses. As well as this, they will fight against Sufyani, and will overcome his army, afterwards they will move towards Bayt-al-Moqaddas (Jerusalem); and will provide the rule for al-Mahdi.

Based on hadiths, the period of time between Shu'ayib ibn Salih's resurrection and al-Mahdi reappearance is 72 months; and Shu'ayb ibn Salih's uprising is going to be after Awf-al-Silmi's uprising and likewise before Sufyani's insurrection.

== Seyyed Khorasani ==
Shu'ayb ibn Salih has been narrated in (most of) the hadiths that will be from the city of Rey (the ancient city, has become present-day Tehran), and it has been mentioned that he will be with Seyyed Khorasani who has the politic leadership of Iranians. According to narrations, they are going to give to the flag of Islam to al-Mahdi. Likewise, they will participate with their forces in al-Mahdi's movement. Khorasani and Shu'aib will be settled among the specific companions of al-Mahdi, and Shuaib bin Salih will be appointed as the commander of all al-Mahdi's forces.

== See also ==
- Mahdi
- Sufyani
- The Occultation
- Khasf al-Bayda'
- Seyed Khorasani
- Al-Yamani (Shiism)
- Voice from heaven
- Reappearance of al-Mahdi
- Nafs-e-Zakiyyah (Pure soul)
- Signs of the reappearance of al-Mahdi
