= Seyed Khorasani =

Islamic leader foretold to appear in end times

Seyed Khorasani (Persian: سید خراسانی, romanized: As-Sayyid Al-Khurāsānī) is an Islamic leader whose rising is an essential part of Islamic eschatology. According to Al-Fadl ibn Shadhan of Neyshabur, in an authentic document from Imam Ja'far al-Sadiq, al-Khorasani is one of the townspeople of Samarkand, and he is considered to be amongst the assistants of the Mahdi.

== Rising ==
According to the hadith(s), Al-Khorasani has a spot on his right hand. It is predicted that he will to move to Kufah with Sufyani at one common day, and then defeat the Sufyani's army with his own army.

His rising is predicted to be commenced from the east of the Earth. With regards to al-Khorasani, ahadith was narrated from the Islamic prophet Muhammad saying:

A group from Mashriq is going to rise, and will provide the way for the rule of the Mahdi.

— Ahadith

It is predicted that after defeating the Sufyani's army in Iraq, al-Khorasani will swear allegiance to al-Mahdi.

=== The Black Standard ===
The rising of al-Khorasani, or the movement of the Black Standard from the side of Khorasan, is considered to be among the signs of the appearance of the Mahdi.

Imam as-Sadiq was reported saying:

Coming out of three groups "Sufyani, Khorasani and Yamani" will be in: a year, a month, and a day.

— Jafar Sadiq

It has been mentioned in the traditions (hadiths) that "you ought to have the expectation of Faraj from three things":

- Establishment of differences between the ones who are from Shaam, for the things which is between them;
- Fear/bewilderment in the month of Ramadan.
- Movement of black flags from Khorasan.

Khorasan can relate to three places:

- A part of the current country of Iran which starts from the Zagros Mountains, towards Herat in present-day Afghanistan
- The areas around Khorasan, which its rulers had ruled.
- The ancient name (2nd century AD-1893AD) of a large area in Central Asia compromising modern-states of Afghanistan, Tajikistan, half of Uzbekistan, parts of Turkmenistan and the eastern part of the modern Iranian state. Persian-speakers in Central Asia still consider themselves as Khorasanis, particularely Tajiks and Hazaras.

== See also ==
- The Occultation
- Khasf al-Bayda'
- Shu'ayb bin Salih
- Voice from heaven
- Reappearance of al-Mahdi
- Nafs-e-Zakiyyah (Pure soul)
- The signed letter of Muhammad al-Mahdi (Tawqee)
