= Bayda (land) =

Desert between Mecca and Medina

Bayda (Arabic: بيداء) is a desert between Mecca and Medina in the Hejaz region. The desert is without water/grass and its distance to Masjid-u-Shajarah is two kilometers towards to the city of Mecca.

According to Islamic narration(s), Khasf al Bayda or swallowing (of the army of Sufyani) in the land of Bayda is among the signs of the appearance of Mahdi.

== Etymology ==
The name of this locality was narrated at the "hadith of Khasf-e-Bayda" (swallowing in Bayda land) by such name. Both of Shia and Sunni Islam sources have mentioned about the event of "swallowing in the territory of Bayda" as one of the signs of the appearance of Mahdi; based on Islamic hadiths.

Bayda means a desert without water and grass, and as an expression it is the name of a vast desert that is located to the 9 kilometer to the southwest of Medina and after Dhu al-Halifa; it likewise has been divided in two southern and northern parts through the way of Medina to Jeddah and Mecca.

== Islamic eschatology ==
Regarding the Khasf al-Bayda, there is a hadith from Muhammad bin 'Ali bin al-Husayn (Muhamad al-Baqir) that says: at Akhar-al-Zaman (End of Time), at the time when the army of Sufyani enters the territory of Bayda, a caller calls: Oh plain, annihilate that nation (of Sufyani army); subsequently the Earth swallows them, and all of them will be swallowed except 3 individuals.

== Prayer ==
Based on Feqhi sources: saying prayers is Makruh (i.e.: not haram but better not to do) in this desert (of Bayda) and the Divine torment will be come down at this locality.

== See also ==
- Seyyed Hassani
- Khasf al-Bayda
- The Occultation
- Seyed Khorasani
- Al-Yamani (Shiism)
- Voice from heaven
- The Fourteen Infallibles
- Nafs-e-Zakiyyah (Pure soul)
- Signs of the reappearance of al-Mahdi
