= Hadith of black flags =

Islamic apocalyptic eschatological motif

The Black Standard flown by the Abbasid armies

The hadith of black flags or black banners are a body of purported eschatological hadith (traditions attributed to the Islamic prophet Muhammad) that describe an army emerging from Khorasan or "the east" bearing black flags, typically preceding the appearance of the Mahdi. Both Western scholarship and Muslim hadith scholars consider the traditions to be spurious. The medieval Muslim scholar Ibn al-Jawzi considered them to be forgeries.

The Abbasids used the traditions to legitimise and marshal support for their revolution against the Umayyad Caliphate, widely disseminating them through propaganda. The Abbasid partisans of Abu Muslim and Abu Salama Hafs al-Khallal flew black banners and were known as the musawwida (lit. 'the bearers of black'); the choice of black corresponded with the popular belief that the colour was associated with the Mahdi. Conscious of their implications, the Umayyads attempted to violently suppress the traditions' dissemination.

In the modern era, the traditions were frequently referenced during the first Taliban takeover of Afghanistan, thought to be a precursor to a return of the caliphate. They also inspired the colour of the flag of the Islamic State and have motivated Salafi jihadists.

== Sources ==
=== Kitab al-Fitan ===
The Kitab al-Fitan (lit. 'Book of Tribulations') of Nu'aym ibn Ḥammād (d. 843), a compilation of apocalyptic hadith, contains multiple black banner traditions, including:

Said ibn al-Musayyib: The Messenger of God said: Black banners belonging to the Abbasids will emerge from the east, and they will remain as long as God wills, then small black banners will emerge that will fight a man from the descendants of Abu Sufyan and his supporters from the direction of the east. They will give their obedience to the Mahdi.

When you see the black banners emerging from the direction of Khorasan, then go to them, even crawling on the snow, for among them is the caliph of God, the Mahdi.

Muhammad ibn al-Hanafiyya: A black banner belonging to the Abbasids will emerge, then another will emerge from Khorasan, with their qālansuwas black [a type of turban], their clothes white, at their vanguard, a man called Shu'ayb b. Salih b. Shu'ayb, from [the tribe of] Tamim, defeating the supporters of the Sufyani, until he settles at Jerusalem (bayt al-maqdis), preparing for the Mahdi his rule, supporting him with 300 from Syria. Between his emergence and the time when he gives over the rule to the Mahdi will be seventy-two months.

=== Akhbar al-Abbas ===
Black banner traditions are also present in the Akhbar al-Abbas, the Abbasids' semi-official history of their revolution, in which the banners are presented as a sign of salvation. Some are given without a full chain of transmission (isnad). One such tradition is attributed to Ibn Abbas:

If a man with a black flag comes out from the East in the year 130 AH (747–748 CE), be sure that this movement will triumph.

The text also describes a lengthy account where Husayn ibn Ali, a grandson of Muhammad, gave Muhammad ibn al-Hanafiyya a "yellow scroll" detailing the emergence of the black banners, which was eventually given to the Abbasid leader Ibrahim al-Imam.

== See also ==
- Islamic flags
- Jihadist flag
