= Khasf al-Bayda =

Destructive event in Islamic eschatology

Khasf al-Bayda (Arabic: خسف البیداء, lit. 'Swallowing the land of Bayda'), in Islamic eschatology, is a future event in which the Earth will swallow up Bayda, a desert area between Mecca and Medina. According to Islamic traditions: the army of Sufyani will be swallowed up in the land of Bayda.

Khasf al-Bayda has been mentioned in both Shia and Sunni sources, and it was narrated that the event will be one of the decisive signs of the appearance of the Mahdi.

== The certain signs ==
According to hadith, there are five (or more) certain signs which will happen prior to the reappearance of the twelfth (last) Imam of Shia Islam, al-Mahdi. Al-Shaykh al-Saduq has narrated—from Ja'far al-Sadiq—that: five signs are decisive before the rising of Qa'im (قائم): Yamani, Sufyani, Heavenly cry (calling) from the sky, The murder of Nafs-e-Zakiyyah and Khasf al-Bayda.

== Swallowing of the army ==
Sufyani and his army will go toward Iraq to attack the Mahdi. When the army enters the territory of Bayda, the Earth will consume the army of Sufyani except for 2 or 3 individuals. Various hadith discuss the numbers in the army of Sufyani. Some sources say that the army of Sufyani will number 12,000; while some say 170,000 and other sources say 300,000

According to a tradition from Muhammad al-Baqir: at the End Time, when Sufyani's army enters the territory of Bayda, a voice will call out:

"O plain, annihilate the nation" (i.e. the army of Sufyani)

— Na'mani, Al-Ghaybah, Maktab al-Saduq, Chapter 14, P. 279

== See also ==
- Occultation (Islam)
- Seyyed Hassani
- Seyed Khorasani
- The Fourteen Infallibles
- Nafs-e-Zakiyyah (Pure soul)
