= Al-Fadl ibn Shadhan =

9th-century Arab Muslim traditionist, jurist, and theologian

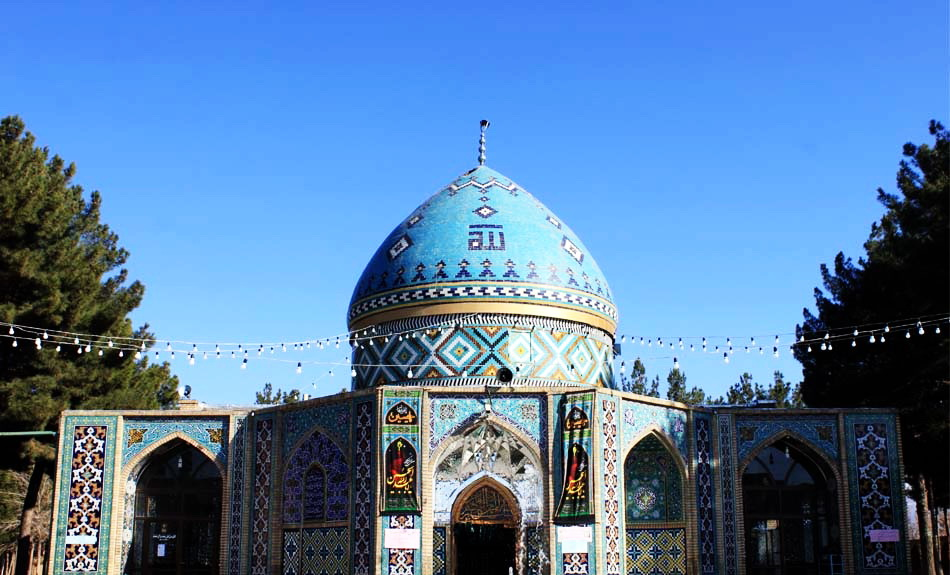

Personal life
- Born: After 791 AD Nishapur
- Died: 260 AH/873 AD
- Era: Islamic Golden Age
- Main interest(s): Hadith, Fiqh, Theology
- Notable work(s): Proof of Reversion, Al-Talaq

Religious life
- Religion: Islam
- Denomination: Shia
- Sect: Twelver
- Jurisprudence: Ja'fari

Muslim leader
- Teacher: al-Ḥasan ibn al-Faddal, Nasr ibn Muzahim, Safwan ibn Yahya, Hammad ibn Isa
- Disciple of: Ali al-Rida, Ali al-Hadi, Hasan al-Askari
- Influenced: Shaykh Tusi, Muhammad ibn Ya'qub al-Kulayni, Ahmad ibn Ali al-Najashi

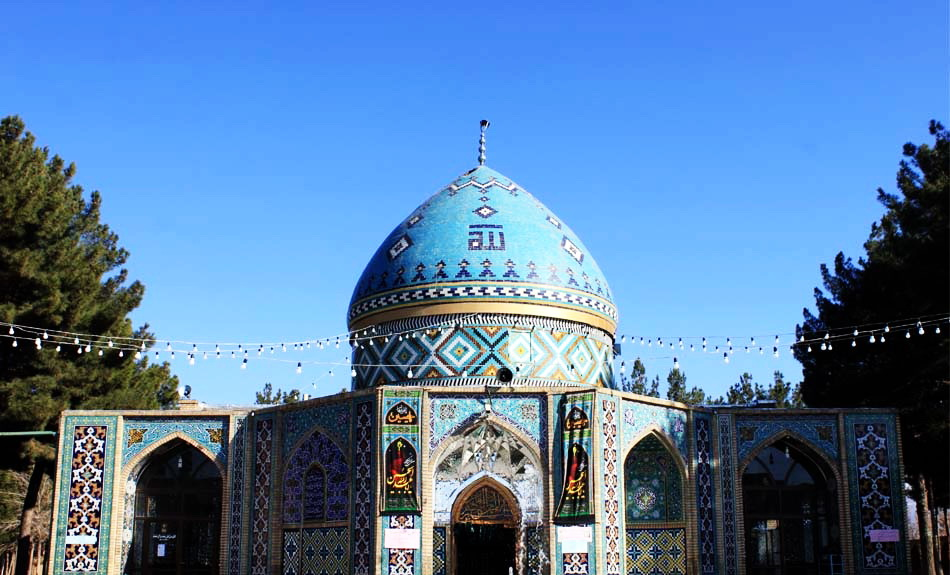
Al-Fadl ibn Shadhan Mausoleum in Nishapur

Abu Muḥammad al-Faḍl ibn Shadhan ibn Khalil al-Azdi al-Naysaburi (Arabic: أبومحمد الفضل بن شاذان بن خليل الأزدي النيسابوري), better known as al-Faḍl ibn Shadhan (d. 260 AH/873 AD) was a prominent Twelver Shia Muslim theologian (mutakallim), traditionist and jurist in the 9th century, who was highly regarded by the Twelver Shiites as one of the leading Imāmī authorities of his time. He was briefly a disciple of the eighth Shia Imam Ali al-Rida (c. 799–818), as well as the tenth and eleventh Imams, Ali al-Hadi (c. 835–868) and Hasan al-Askari (c. 868–874).

== Life ==
Little is known about his life. He was probably born at the end of the 2nd century AH (791-816 AD). He lived and grew up in Nishapur, as his nisbah al-Azdi indicates; he belonged to the Arab tribe of Azd who settled in Khorasan after the Muslim conquest. He was the son of Shadhan ibn Khalil, a well known Imami traditionist/muhaddith. Al-Fadl and his family migrated to Baghdad when he was young, where he began his education, and later relocated to the neighboring city of Kufa, and then finally to Wasit. Al-Fadl studied under prominent scholars such as Al-Ḥasan ibn Al-Faddal, Nasr ibn Muzahim, Safwan ibn Yahya and Hammad ibn Isa, and was also recorded to have been a disciple of the Twelver Imam Ali al-Ridha. After spending years in Iraq, al-Fadl returned to Nishapur and continued his educational activities, until he was exiled by the Tahirid governor for reportedly practicing Shi'ism. However, the sentence did not last for long. During his exile, he stayed in hiding in Bayhaq, a town near Nishapur. While in hiding, he became ill, and eventually died in 873 or 874 AD. A mausoleum dedicated to him is located in Nishapur.

== Work ==
ibn Shadhan was also known as a jurist, and Mohagheq Hali has counted him among the first rank Imamiyyah jurisprudents. As a narrator, Ibn Shazan is included in the series of records of many Imamiyyah hadiths, and Najashi has confirmed his endorsement. The most prominent scientific aspect of Ibn Shazan's personality is his speech, as Nasir al-Din al-Tusi mentioned him as a great orator. Based on the little information that is available, the basis of Ibn Shazan's theological teachings, after the two martyrdoms, is the acknowledgment of God's authority and the acknowledgment of "I am with God". The generalities of his belief about Imamate are in complete agreement with the Twelve Imams beliefs.

== Books ==
His works are considered to be more than 180 titles, some of which are in theology and jurisprudence, were listed by Najashi in the book of Regal and Tusi in the book, including:

1. The proof of reversion, a selection of which has been published by Bassem Mousavi in Trathana magazine;

2. Al-Talaq, which was mentioned by Najashi and Shaykh Tusi, and Kulayni quoted parts of it that are apparently taken from his book;

3. The causes are in the causes related to worship that Najashi and Tusi mentioned.

4, 5 and 6. Al-Kabeer Al-Kabir, Al-Awsat Al-Fareez and Al-Sagher Al-Fareez;

7. Al-Badlan issues, which Najashi has mentioned and Tusi has quoted parts of it in some of his works.

8. Day and night, which is said to have reached the opinion of Imam Hasan Askari (a.s.) and was approved by him.

== See also ==
- List of pre-modern Arab scientists and scholars
- Seyed Khorasani and signs of the appearance of the Mahdi
