= Final letter of Muhammad al-Mahdi to al-Samarri =

The final letter of Muhammad al-Mahdi, known as the Hidden Imam in Twelver Shi'ism, to his agent, Abu al-Hasan Ali ibn Muhammad al-Samarri, predicted the latter's imminent death and announced the beginning of the Major Occultation (941–present). In Twelver belief, the Major Occultation concludes with the rise of al-Mahdi in the end of time to establish peace and justice on earth. This letter belongs to the Tawqīʿāt (Arabic: توقيعات, lit. 'signed letters'), a collection of signed letters and pronouncements attributed to the Hidden Imam.

== Etymology ==
Tawqīʿ (تَوْقِيع) is derived from the verb waqaʿa (وَقَعَ), a polysemous word which often means to fall or cause to fall. Tawqīʿ itself means a person's name or mark used in signing a letter (signature). Historically, tawqi' referred to a sign on camel's saddle. In this sense, tawqīʿ came be identified with a signature of caliph or ruler on a letter. Tawqi'at is the plural form of tawqīʿ. In Twelver literature, the former word often refers the collection of signed letters and pronouncements attributed to the Hidden Imam.

== Historical background ==
Until their deaths, the tenth and eleventh Shia Imams (Ali al-Hadi and Hasan al-Askari, respectively) were held in the garrison town of Samarra under close surveillance or house arrest by the Abbasids, who are often responsible in Shia sources for poisoning the two Imams.

Contemporary to the tenth Imam, the Abbasid al-Mutawakkil violently prosecuted the Shia, partly due to a renewed Zaydi opposition. The restrictive policies of al-Mutawakkil towards the tenth Imam were later adopted by his son, al-Mu'tamid, who is reported to have kept the eleventh Imam under house arrest without any visitors. Instead, al-Askari is known to have primarily communicated with his followers through a network of representatives. Among them was Uthman ibn Sa'id (d. 880), who is said to have disguised himself as a seller of cooking fat to avoid the Abbasid agents, hence his nickname al-Samman. Tabatabai suggests that these restrictions were placed on al-Askari because the caliphate had come to know about traditions among the Shia elite, predicting that the eleventh Imam would father the eschatological Mahdi.

Immediately after the death of al-Askari in 260 AH (874 CE), Uthman ibn Sa'id claimed that the eleventh Imam had a young son, named Muhammad, who had entered a state of occultation (ghayba) due to the Abbasid threat to his life. As the special agent of al-Askari, Uthman also claimed that he had been appointed to represent his son, Muhammad, though he is more commonly known as Muhammad al-Mahdi (lit. 'the rightly guided'). Twelver sources detail that Muhammad al-Mahdi made his only public appearance to lead the funeral prayer for his father instead of his uncle, Ja'far.

Thus began a period of about seventy years, later termed the Minor Occultation (al-ghaybat al-sughra, 260-329 AH, 874–940 CE), during which it is believed that four successive agents acted as intermediaries between the Hidden Imam and his followers. These four agents are collectively known as the Four Deputies (al-nuwwab al-arba').

== Content of the letter ==
The fourth agent, Abu al-Hasan Ali ibn Muhammad al-Samarri, is said to have received a letter from al-Mahdi shortly before his death in 329 (941). The letter predicted the death of the fourth agent in six days and announced the beginning of the complete (tamma) occultation, later called the Major Occultation (al-ghaybat al-kubra). The letter, ascribed to al-Mahdi, added that the complete occultation would continue until God granted him permission to manifest himself again in a time when the earth would be filled with tyranny. The letter also emphasized that anyone claiming to be the deputy of the Imam henceforth had to be considered an imposter.

This and similar letters to the four agents and other Shia figures are said to have had the same handwriting, suggesting that they were written by the Hidden Imam. Ibn Babawayh (d. 991) and Tusi (d. 1067) both quote this final letter, parts of which are presented below:

O' Ali b. Muhammad al-Samarri, may God reward your brethren in your death, which is going to take place in six days' time. So take care of your affairs and do not appoint anyone in your place, since the complete occultation has taken place. I will not appear until God permits me to do so (may His name be exalted) and that will be after a long time and after the hearts become hard and the earth is filled with wickedness. In the near future there will be those among my followers who will claim to have seen me. Beware, those who claim this before the rise of al-Sufyani and the [hearing of the] voice from the sky are liars.

— ascribed to Muhammad al-Mahdi

== See also ==
- Hadith of Jesus praying behind Mahdi
- Four Deputies
- Reappearance of Muhammad al-Mahdi
- Signs of the appearance of the Mahdi

== Sources ==
- Eliash, J. (2022). "Ḥasan Al-ʿAskarī". In Bearman, P. (ed.). Encyclopaedia of Islam (Second ed.). Brill Reference Online.
- Klemm, Verena (2007). ISLAM IN IRAN ix. THE DEPUTIES OF MAHDI. Vol. XIV/2. pp. 143–6.
- Sachedina, Abdulaziz Abdulhussein (1981). Islamic Messianism: The Idea of Mahdī in Twelver Shīʻism. Suny press. ISBN 978-0873954426.
- Daftary, Farhad (2013). A History of Shi'i Islam. I.B. Tauris. ISBN 9780755608669.
- Hussain, Jassim M. (1986). Occultation of the Twelfth Imam: A Historical Background. Routledge Kegan & Paul. ISBN 9780710301581.
- Momen, Moojan (1985). An Introduction to Shi'i Islam. Yale University Press. ISBN 9780300034998.
- Tabatabai, Sayyid Mohammad Hosayn (1975). Shi'ite Islam. Translated by Sayyid Hossein Nasr. State University of New York Press. ISBN 0-87395-390-8.
- Donaldson, Dwight M. (1933). The Shi'ite Religion: A History of Islam in Persia and Iraḳ. AMS Press.
- Modarressi, Hossein (1993). Crisis and Consolidation in the Formative Period of Shi'ite Islam: Abū Ja'far Ibn Qiba Al-Rāzī and His Contribution to Imāmite Shī'ite Thought (PDF). Darwin Press. ISBN 9780878500956. Archived from the original (PDF) on 2022-06-16.
- Holt, P.M.; Lambton, Ann K.S.; Lewis, Bernard, eds. (1970). The Cambridge history of Islam. Vol. 1. Cambridge University Press.
- Amir-Moezzi, Mohammad Ali (2007). "ISLAM IN IRAN vii. THE CONCEPT OF MAHDI IN TWELVER SHIʿISM". Encyclopaedia Iranica. Vol. XIV/2. pp. 136–143.
- Amir-Moezzi, Mohammad Ali (1998). "ESCHATOLOGY iii. Imami Shiʿism". Encyclopaedia Iranica. Vol. VIII/6. pp. 575–581.
- Amir-Moezzi, Mohammad Ali (2016). Divine Guide in Early Shi'ism: The Sources of Esotericism in Islam. SUNY Press. ISBN 9780791494790.
- Hulmes, Edward D.A. (2013). "HASAN AL-'ASKARI, ABU MUHAMMAD HASAN IBN 'ALI (c. AD 845-74)". In Netton, Ian Richard (ed.). Encyclopedia of Islamic Civilization and Religion. Routledge. p. 217. ISBN 9781135179670.
- Gleave, Robert (2004). "GHAYBA(T)". In Martin, Richard C. (ed.). Encyclopedia of Islam and the Muslim World. Vol. 2. Macmillan Reference. pp. 273, 274. ISBN 0-02-865604-0.
