= Hadith of Jesus praying behind Mahdi =

Collection of hadith

Hadith of Jesus Praying Behind Mahdi (Persian: حدیث نماز خواندن عیسی به امامت مهدی) refers to a collection of hadith (sayings of Muhammad) related to the prophecy that after Jesus (Isa) descends and joins the Mahdi and his followers in the final days before the destruction of Earth, he will decline the Mahdi's offer to lead the Mahdi and company in salat (Islamic ritual prayer, which Muslims perform five times a day) telling the Mahdi to lead. The Mahdi is an Islamic figure in Islamic eschatology, and salat is the Islamic practice of worship of God. The prophecy is narrated in numerous hadith collections. A total of 29 hadiths relate the return of Jesus, and his prayer with Mahdi's lead.

== Hadith ==
Both Sunni and Shia hadith narrate this story.

A hadith attributed to Abu Hurairah reports:Sahih Bukhari, Vol. 4, Book 55, Hadith 658

This hadith has been narrated on the authority of Abu Hurairah that I heard the Prophet said: "What will be your condition when the son of Mary will come down to you and your Imam will be from amongst you"

Allamah Sayyid Sa'eed Akhtar Rizvi quotes the above tradition in his book "Muhammad (S) is the Last Prophet" and concludes:

This refers to the fact that prophet Jesus (a.s.) will not lead in the prayer, but the Imam of the Muslims who will leading them will lead in the prayers, and prophet Jesus will follow him.

A hadith attributed to Jabir ibn Abd Allah reports:Sahih Muslim Book 1, Hadith 293

This hadith has been narrated on the authority of Jabir Ibn Abdillah al-Ansari that I heard the Messenger of Allah saying: "A group of my Ummah will fight for the truth until near the day of judgment when Jesus, the son of Mary, will descend, and the leader of them will ask him to lead the prayer, but Jesus declines, saying: "No, Verily, among you Allah has made leaders for others and He has bestowed his bounty upon them."

Abu Ya’ala provides another version of this hadith in his musnad with more clear terms. A hadith attributed to Jabir ibn Abd Allah reports:

This hadith has been narrated on the authority of Jabir Ibn Abdillah al-Ansari that the Messenger of Allah said: "A group among my Ummah will continue to fight for the truth until Jesus, the son of Mary, will descend, and the Imam of them will ask him to lead the prayer, but Jesus replies: "You have more right to it, and verily Allah has honored some of you over others in this Ummah."

A hadith attributed to Al-Husayn Al-Ajiri reports:

The traditions of al-Mustafa (S) on the rising of al-Mahdi has been transmitted via numerous authorities and is more than the level of (being sufficient for) Mutawatir, describing that he is of his Ahlul-Bayt, and will fill the earth with justice, and that Jesus (as) will come at the same time and he will assist Jesus for killing al-Dajjal in the land of Palestine, and that he will lead this nation and Jesus will pray behind him.

A hadith attributed to Sa'id ibn Jubayr reports:

It is narrated from Ibne Abbas that the Messenger of Allah (a.s) said, “My Caliphs and successors are twelve persons, first of whom is my brother and the last my great grandson.” He was asked, “O Allah’s Messenger! Who is your brother?” He replied, “Ali bin Abi Talib.” He was asked, “Who is your great grandson?” He replied, “Mahdi, who shall fill the earth with justice and equity like it would be fraught with injustice and oppression. By the One in Whose hands is my life! Even if a day remains for the earth, the Almighty Allah will prolong this day till my son, Mahdi reappears and Isa bin Maryam descends to the earth and recites prayer behind His Eminence. The earth shall be illuminated from the east to the west.

== Interpretation ==
Sunni and Shia Muslims hold that Isa (Jesus) and the Mahdi will be present at the same time, that the leaders who will carry out their commands will be from the Quraysh tribe, It's also believed that he will perform the prayer behind Mahdi. Jalaluddin al-Suyuti writes in his Nuzool Isa Ibn Maryam Akhir al-Zaman that:

I have heard some of the deniers of (truth) deny what has been conveyed about Jesus that when he descends will pray the Fajr prayer behind al-Mahdi. They say, Jesus has higher status than to pray behind a non-Prophet. This is a bizarre opinion since the issue of prayer of Jesus behind al-Mahdi has been proven strongly via numerous authentic traditions from the Messenger of Allah, who is the most truthful.

== See also ==
- Mahdi
- Jesus in Islam
- Signs of the appearance of Mahdi
