= Hadith of Aden-Abyan =

Hadith of Aden-Abyan (Arabic: حديث عدن أبين) is a prophecy revealed by the Islamic prophet Muhammad predicting the appearance of an army from the Aden and Abyan regions in Yemen who will make Islam victorious over its opponents.

== Prophecy ==
In the Hadith, the Prophet is reported to have said:

"Out of Aden-Abyan will come 12000, giving victory to the (religion of) Allah and His Messenger. They are the best between me and them."

— Musnad of Imam Ahmad

== Interpretation ==
The Hadith refers to the apocalyptic events of the end of time which underlines the involvement of the people of southern Arabia and their goal to establish Islamic rule. Recently, a militant organization named Aden-Abyan Islamic Army was founded in Yemen, to establish an Islamic government in Arabia.

== See also ==
- Islamic eschatology
