= Mohammad Hassan Khalil =

American professor at Michigan State University

Mohammad Hassan Khalil, also known as Mohammad Khalil, was raised in East Lansing, Michigan, and is currently professor of religious studies, adjunct professor of law, and director of the Muslim Studies Program at Michigan State University.

== Career ==
Khalil received his B.A. (with High Distinction), M.A., and Ph.D. from the University of Michigan (Ann Arbor), and was previously an assistant professor of religion and visiting professor of law at the University of Illinois at Urbana-Champaign.

Khalil is the author of Islam and the Fate of Others: The Salvation Question (New York: Oxford University Press, 2012), which shows how four of Islam's most prominent scholars—al-Ghazali (d. 1111), Ibn al-'Arabi (d. 1240), Ibn Taymiyyah (d. 1328), and Muhammad Rashid Rida (d. 1935)--imagined (each in his own way) a paradise replete with various categories of non-Muslims. In addition, Khalil argues that neither exclusivism—the belief that only Muslims could ever be saved—nor pluralism—the belief that multiple religions are equally salvific—was as popular in Islamic theology as numerous scholars of religion have assumed. This is a point that Khalil highlights in his article "Salvation and the 'Other' in Islamic thought: The Contemporary Pluralism Debate (in English) (Religion Compass 2011).

In April 2010, Khalil organized the first known international symposium on salvation in Islamic thought called "Islam, Salvation, and the Fate of Others." The symposium featured a diversity of eminent scholars of Islam and was held at the University of Illinois (Urbana-Champaign). Most of the papers presented at the symposium appear in a volume edited by Khalil called Between Heaven and Hell: Islam, Salvation and the Fate of Others (New York: Oxford University Press, 2013)--the first ever multi-authored volume on salvation in Islam in English.

In his 2018 book Jihad, Radicalism, and the New Atheism, Khalil scrutinizes the popular New Atheist claim that Islam is fundamentally violent; he does this "by comparing the conflicting interpretations of jihad offered by mainstream Muslim scholars, Muslim radicals, and New Atheists."

From 2012 to 2018, Khalil served on the board of directors of the Society for the Study of Muslim Ethics. In 2024, he was elected president (after having served as vice president) of the North American Association of Islamic and Muslim Studies.

== Works ==
Islam and the Fate of Others: The Salvation Question (New York: Oxford University Press, 2012)

Between Heaven and Hell: Islam, Salvation, and the Fate of Others (New York: Oxford University Press, 2013)

Jihad, Radicalism, and the New Atheism (New York: Cambridge University Press, 2018)

Muslims and US Politics Today: A Defining Moment (Harvard University Press and ILEX, 2019)

American Jedi: The Salman Hamdani Story (Alexander Street Films, 2023)
