= Murder of al-Nafs al-Zakiyya =

The Murder of al-Nafs al-Zakiyya (Arabic: قتل النفس الزكية, Persian: قتل نفس زکیه), is the murder of the Pure Soul in advance of the rise of the Mahdi.

Nafs-e Zakiyyah's story has been told in Islamic narrations (mostly in Shia hadiths). Allegedly it would transpire 15 days before al-Mahdi's rising in al-Masjid al-Haram.

Nafs al-Zakiyya is either the son of Husayn ibn Ali; (or, from Hassani Sayyids based on some narrations). He will be killed in Mecca, between Rokn and Maqam.

== Sign of reappearance ==
“Five signs will become manifest before the reappearance of the Qaim: Advent of Yamani and Sufyani, call from the sky, the sinking of Baida land and the killing of the Pure Soul (Nafse Zakiyyah).”
