= IslamQA.info =

Salafist Islamic information website

Islamqa.info
- Website type: Islamic, legal/religious
- Available in: Arabic, English, Persian, Japanese, Chinese, Uighur, French, Spanish, Indonesian, German, Portuguese, Hindi, Russian, Urdu, Turkish and Bengali
- Creator: Muhammad Saalih Al-Munajjid
- Website: Website
- Commercial: No
- Registration: optional
- Launched: 1996
- Current status: Active

Islam Q&A (aka Islam Question & Answer) is an Islamic academic, educational, da'wah website which aims to offer advice and academic answers to questions about Islam based on evidence from Islamic religious texts in an adequate and easy-to- understand manner. It was founded by and operates under the general supervision of Muhammad Saalih Al-Munajjid, who is a Syrian-born Palestinian-Saudi Islamic scholar.

== History ==
The service was one of the first online fatwa services, if not the first. The launching of IslamQA.info in 1996 by Muhammad Saalih Al-Munajjid marked the beginning of an attempt to answer questions according to the Sunni interpretation of the Quran and Hadith. The website states that "All questions and answers on this site have been prepared, approved, revised, edited, amended or annotated by Shaykh Muhammad Saalih al-Munajjid, the supervisor of this site."

== Popularity ==
According to the website Similarweb, islamqa.info had 10.1 million visits in January 2022, down from 13.66 million visits in March 2021, similar to 10 million visits per month in October and November 2020. Similarweb ranked islamqa 205th in the world in the category of "Community and Society > Faith and Beliefs" websites in January 2022, down from sixth in the world in the category in March 2021. While it was the highest ranking Islamic website in March 2021, as of January 2022 it ranks behind Islamweb.net at 17.2 million visits. Alexa rated it as the 8157th most popular website globally, 3 March 2022; 7,612th in "global engagement", 15 March 2022.

== Contents ==
IslamQA is available in 16 languages, including English, Arabic, Urdu, Hindi, Turkish, German, Bangla, Chinese, Russian, French, and Spanish, the website provides fatawa covering basic tenets of faith, etiquette and morals, Islamic history, and Islamic politics.

The site describes itself in the following manner:

Islam Q&A is an academic, educational, da‘wah website which aims to offer advice and academic answers based on evidence from religious texts in an adequate and easy-to-understand manner... The website welcomes questions from everyone, Muslims and otherwise, about Islamic, psychological and social matters.

The site's vision is to be "an encyclopaedia about Islam". Its aims (as described on the website) are:

1. To spread Islam and call people to it.
2. To spread Islamic knowledge and dispel ignorance among Muslims.
3. To respond to people’s needs by offering advice and answers based on evidence from religious texts.
4. To refute the specious arguments of doubters about Islam.
5. To advise people concerning day-to-day issues, by giving educational, academic advice about social and other matters.

=== Methodology ===
The site describes its methodology as such:

The website promotes the ‘aqeedah (beliefs) of Ahl as-Sunnah wa’l-Jamaa‘ah and the followers of the righteous early generations of Islam (as-salaf as-saalih). It strives to ensure that the answers are based on evidence from the Holy Qur’an and the soundly-narrated (saheeh) prophetic Sunnah, and are taken from the writings of the scholars, including the imams of the four madhhabs, Imam Abu Haneefah, Imam Maalik, Imam ash-Shaafa‘i and Imam Ahmad ibn Hanbal, as well as other earlier and later scholars, and from the statements of fiqh councils and seekers of knowledge who conduct research in various Islamic specialties. The website avoids getting involved in issues that are of no benefit, such as empty arguments, trading insults and fruitless debates.

== Controversy in Saudi Arabia ==
The website was banned in Saudi Arabia because it was issuing independent fatwas. In Saudi Arabia, the kingdom's Council of Senior Scholars has the sole responsibility for issuing fatwas. The council was granted this exclusive authority to issue fatwas by a royal edict issued in August 2010 (while restrictions had been in place since 2005, they were seldom enforced); this move was described by Christopher Boucek as "the latest example of how the state is working to assert its primacy over the country's religious establishment." But as of now, the site is no longer banned.

== See also ==
- Islam Online
- Imams Online
