= Voice from heaven =

The voice from heaven (Arabic: صوت من السماء), according to Shia Islamic eschatology, will be words spoken by Gabriel (Jibrael), which is one of the signs of Mahdi's appearance.

== Overview ==
The voice from heaven by Gabriel is amongst five certain signs for appearance of Mahdi. The voice will be heard by everyone of their own language. Heaven (or the sky) is introduced as the sound source in many narrations. The voice can be heard from near and far alike and will awaken sleeping people. It is mercy for the believers and for disbelievers is the torment, then Mahdi will become renowned.

== Time ==
Though the voice from heaven is claimed as a confirmed sign, but there is a discrepancy in the event time. According to a narration from Muhammad al-Baqir this voice will be heard in Ramadan before reappearance of Muhammad al-Mahdi. In compliance with Al-Shaykh Al-Mufid, as well as others, there is a Hadith which state a synchronicity between reappearance of Muhammad al-Mahdi and the voice from heaven. Based on another narration it will happen on Thursday night, twenty-third day of Ramadan.

== Content ==
As claimed by most narration, contents of the voice will be about Muhammad al-Mahdi and his characteristics; and it will invite people towards him. Also, Shiite victory will be mentioned.

== Voice of Satan ==
At the end of the day of heavenly voice, the voice of Satan will aim at persuading others in not following Muhammad al-Mahdi.

== See also ==
- Sufyani
- Khasf al-Bayda'
- Al-Yamani (Shiism)
- Nafs-e-Zakiyyah (Pure soul)
- Reappearance of Muhammad al-Mahdi
- Signs of the reappearance of Muhammad al-Mahdi
- Voice of God
