= Yamani (Shiism) =

Pre-messianic figure in Shia Islamic eschatology

The Yamani or al-Yamani (Arabic: الیماني) is a pre-messianic figure in Shia Islamic eschatology, who is prophesied to appear to the people to guide them to the truth of Imam al-Mahdi, the ultimate savior of mankind from the Shia viewpoint and the final Imam of the Twelve Imams.

== Yamani's personality ==
According to Shia sources, it is not clear whether al-Yamani is one of descendants of Hasan ibn Ali or Husayn ibn Ali. A tradition by Ja'far al-Sadiq about Yamani ancestry said, "[One] from the lineage of my uncle Zayd will rise from Yemen." There are different names for al-Yamani in different traditions, such as "Hassan", "Hussein", "Saeed", "Mansour", and "Nasr". Muhammad, prophet of Islam, called him "Nasr" because he will come before Imam al-Mahdi. In some sources, al-Yamani is mentioned as someone who invites people to the Imam al-Mahdi. Additionally, some sources call al-Yamani "Mansour" and indicate he will assist Muhammad al-Mahdi in battle.

== Appearance of Yamani ==
In Shia theology, five signs are guaranteed to occur before Imam al-Mahdi’s appearance. One of them is the appearance of al-Yamani, the ruler of Yemen, who will invite people to right and truth. Ja'far al-Sadiq states the five signs that will occur before Imam al-Mahdi's appearance include: the appearance of Sufyani and Yamani, the loud cry in the sky, the murder of Al-Nafs al-Zakiyyah, and the earth swallowing a group of people in the land of Beyda. In another Hadith, Imam Ja'far al-Sadiq says that Yamani appears from Yemen with a white flag.

=== Time and place of the appearance ===
Shia Muslims believe that Yamani will rise up from Yemen. The sixth Imam of Shia says about the place of uprising, "[t]he rise of the Sufyani will be from Syria (Sham) and the rise of the Yemani will be from Yemen. But it's important to notice that two Yamanies are mentioned in Hadith. One rises from Yemen who will not support the promised Mahdi but will fight Sufyani and finally die. The other, which is not mentioned to be from Yemen, will support Imam Mahdi.” A Hadith by Muhammad al-Baqir explained, "[t]he appearance of Sufyani, Yamani and Khorasani will take place in one year, one month and one day (at the same time), they will take place as a series of events that are all connected by one string. Among these individuals the Yamani is the closest to guidance, for he calls the people to join Imam al-Mahdi. When he rises the trading of weapons will be prohibited for every Muslim. When he rises join him immediately, for his flag is the flag of guidance and prosperity and no Muslim should oppose it. Any one who does so will go to hell, because the Yamani calls to the right path." In another Hadith, Ali al-Ridha said, "[t]he rise of Sufyani, Yemeni, and Khorasani will be at the same year, month, and day. Trouble will rise from every direction. Woe to those who try to resist them!" Yamani's appearance will occur during the month of Rajab. Some sources suggest that Yamani and Khurasani will be allied against Sufyani.

=== The conclusion of the appearance ===
While traditions provide few details about the conclusion of Yamani's appearance, a hadith by Ja'far al-Sadiq says, "[a]fter the numerous wars and failures, he will crush the Sufyani and kill him."

== Claimants ==
Ahmed al-Hasan, a Shia Muslim from Basra, Iraq, claimed to be the Yamani during the 2000s. He adopted the epithet, becoming Ahmed al-Hassan al-Yamani. He went into hiding in 2007, following the January 2007 Battle of Najaf.

== See also ==
- Qa'im Al Muhammad
- Khasf al-Bayda
- Signs of the appearance of the Mahdi
- Voice from heaven
- Sufyani
- Al-Nafs al-Zakiyyah (Pure Soul)
