= Al-A'raf (realm of afterlife) =

Borderland between heaven and hell in Islam

Diagram of "Plain of Assembly" (Ard al-Hashr) on Judgment Day, from an autograph manuscript of Futuhat al-Makkiyya by Ibn Arabi, the Sufi mystic and Muslim philosopher, with the 'Araf (Bridge), Jahannam (Hell), and Marj al-Jannat (Meadow of Paradise).

In Islam, al-A'raf (Arabic: الأعراف literally translated as "the heights" in English) is a separator realm or borderland between Jannah (Paradise) and Jahannam (Hell), inhabited by those who are evenly balanced in their sins and virtues, they are not entirely evil nor are they entirely good. This place may be described as a kind of benevolent purgatory with privation but without suffering. Some hadith depict that rather than this place being a middle ground purgatory in between Heaven and Hell, it is actually just the top layer of Hell, the least severe layer.

== Scriptural basis ==
Al-A'raf is also the name of a surah in the Quran. The realm of Al-A'raf is described in ayat 46-47 of the surah:

There will be a barrier [ḥijāb] between Paradise and Hell. And on the heights [al-aʿrāf] ˹of that barrier˺ will be people who will recognize ˹the residents of˺ both by their appearance. They will call out to the residents of Paradise, “Peace be upon you!” They will have not yet entered Paradise, but eagerly hope to. When their eyes will turn towards the residents of Hell, they will pray, “Our Lord! Do not join us with the wrongdoing people.”

— Q.7:46-47

== Interpretation ==
In terms of classical Islam, "the only options" afforded by the Qur'an for the resurrected are an eternity of horrible punishments of The Fire (hell) or the delightful rewards of The Garden (paradise). Islamic tradition has raised the question of whether or not consignment to the Fire is eternal, or eternal for all, but "has found no reason to amend" the limit of two options in the afterlife. However, 7:46-47 in the Quran has "led to a great deal of speculation concerning the possibility of a third place".

This has been called the "Limbo" theory of Islam, as described by Jane Smith and Yvonne Haddad. It implies that some individuals are not immediately sent to The Fire or The Garden, but are held in a state of limbo. Smith and Haddad believe it is "very doubtful" that the Qur'anic meant for al-aʿrāf to be understood as an abode for those deceased in an 'intermediate category", but this has come to be "the most commonly held interpretation". As for who the inhabitants of al-aʿrāf are, the "majority of exegetes" support the theory that they are those whose actions in dunya were balanced – whose good deeds keep them from the Fire and whose evil deeds keep them from the Garden. After everyone else has been let into the Garden, and if the mercy of their Lord permits it, they will be allowed in.

The realm is described as a high curtain between Hell and Paradise. Ibn Kathir described A'raf as a wall that contains a gate. In this high wall lived people who witness the terror of Hell and the beauty of Paradise. Cyril Glassé describes al-A'raf as an "intermediary state" without suffering, inhabited by those who are without "fundamental fault" but who nonetheless require purification before being allowed into paradise.

Al-A'raf has some similarities to the Christian concept of Purgatory. Al-Haafith Al-Hakami said about the people of Al-A‘raaf, "They will be kept between Paradise and Hell for a period of time that Allaah wills, then they will be allowed to enter Paradise."

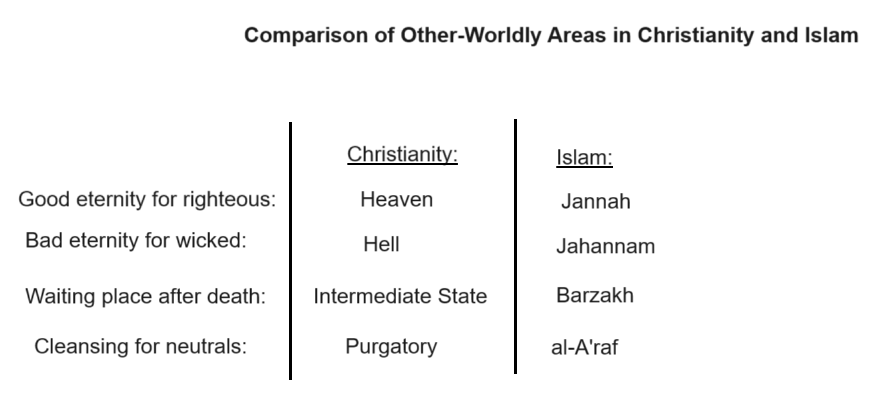
Comparison of Other-wordly places in Christianity and Islam

== Surah ==
Al-Araf is also the name of 7th chapter (sūrah) of the Qur'an, with 206 verses (āyāt).

== See also ==
- Purgatory
- Gehenna
- Barzakh
- Matarta in Mandaeism
- Limbo – Theological concept
