= Sufyani =

Evil figure in Islamic eschatology

The Sufyani (Arabic: السفیاني) is a figure in Islamic eschatology who is usually portrayed in hadiths as a tyrant who will spread corruption and mischief. According to Shia Hadith, the Sufyani will rise in the month of Rajab.

Reports about the Sufyani are also found in Sunni Hadith. The Sufyani is not to be confused with another figure of the end times, the Dajjal. It is said that he will kill children and rip out the bellies of women, murder those from the household of the Prophet and rule over Syria.

It is also said that when the Mahdi appears, the Sufyani will send an army to seize and kill him, but, when the Sufyani and his army reach the desert of Bayda, they would be swallowed up.

However, some sources, mostly Sunni, claim that the hadith describing the Sufyani are unreliable and are based on a "garbled version" of a legend "fabricated by traditionists with Shia and pro- 'Abbasid sentiments". Others reverse his role as an evil-doer by describing him as an ally, not an enemy, of the Mahdi.

== Prophecies ==
=== Prelude ===
Before the Sufyani appears, a sedition will arise in the Maghreb and spread in every direction such that no party or group can protect itself from it.

Disorder, strife, and fear will emerge in the Magrib (west)... Strife will proliferate.

A kind of corruption will surface from which no party will be able to protect itself, and spread immediately in every direction. This situation will persist until one comes and says: "O people, from now on your leader is Imam Mahdi(as)."

Later the sedition which started in the west will arrive in Shaam (Levant): two banners will fight for control over the region; fighting until their armies are exhausted.

=== Arrival ===
It is said that following those events, the Sufyani will appear in Damascus and start an uprising in the dry valley of Transjordan and move to seize Damascus. It is said that he will gain much support, advance to capture the rest of Syria, and defeat the two other competing forces. It is said that once he captures the five districts of Shaam, he will send armies to Iraq.

Abu Hurairah narrates that the Prophet said:

A man will emerge from the depths of Damascus. He will be called Sufyani. Most of those who follow him will be from the tribe of Kalb. He will kill by ripping the stomachs of women and even kill the children. A man from my family will appear in the Haram, the news of his advent will reach the Sufyani and he will send to him one of his armies. He (referring to the Mahdi) will defeat them. They will then travel with whoever remains until they come to a desert and they will be swallowed. None will be saved except the one who had informed the others about them.

Nu'aym bin Hammad quotes Khalid bin Ma'dan as saying, "The Sufyani will emerge with three staffs in his hand. Anyone whom he strikes with them will die."

=== Dominance ===
It is said that the Sufyani will be followed, for the most part, by the tribe of Banu Kalb and fight with anyone daring to oppose him. Injustice will rule the day, and the Sufyani's disregard for life will extend to women and children. The tribe of Qays will rise up against him; however, they will not succeed, and he will slaughter all of them. One of the Sufyani's wonders consists of his staffs, which will kill anyone when he strikes them.

It is also said that the Sufyani's army will go to Kufa, a city in Iraq, and that from there, he will launch an attack against the Khurasan. At the Gate of Istakhr, Shu'ayb bin Salih and the Hashemites will join forces and engage his army. The battle will cost many lives, and Sufyani will suffer a temporary defeat. It is then that a yearning for the Mahdi's appearance becomes universal.

It is also said that the army of the Sufyani will march from Iraq to seize the Mahdi. However, when they reach the desert near Dhi Hulayfah, the ground will swallow them up. Two soldiers will escape to convey the news, but even when the Sufyani learns of the occurrence, he will not be deterred. Some people from the Quraysh will escape to Constantinople, which will not be under Muslim control. The Sufyani will ask for their return, and when they arrive, they and their allies will be killed.

=== Death of Sufyani ===
According to prophecies, when the Sufyani learns of the Mahdi, he and his army will go towards Iraq to attack Mahdi. When the army enters the territory of Bayda, the Earth will consume his army except two or three individuals. In regards to the event of Khasf-al-Bayda, diverse hadiths describe the size of his army. Some sources say that the army Sufyani will number 12,000; while some say 170,000 and some sources say 300,000 The Shia commentator Shaikh Tabarsi interprets Quran verse 34:51 concerning the fate of the army of the Sufyani, referring to it as the army of the desert of Bayda, where the earth will swallow them.

== Claimants ==
At least nine figures revolted in the Levant while using Sufyani as their title between 749 and 1413 CE. The first one was Ziad ibn Abdollah ibn Yazid ibn Muawiah ibn Abi Sufyan, who revolted against the Abbasids. The second Sufyani revolted in 754. Abu Harb al-Muburqa claimed the mantle about one hundred years later. In 1413, someone used this title and revolted against the Mamluk Sultanate. He tried to exactly follow the Hadiths, but the Mamluks suppressed and killed him.

== Skepticism ==
On some of the details of the Sufyani tale, the scholar Muhammad Benshili casts doubt:

it is not possible to determine whether he will send two armies against the Mahdi or only one, or if he himself will be swallowed up with his troops or remain in Baghdad.

Going beyond details to essence, at least one source (the Salafi fatwa site IslamQA.info) considers the hadith of Sufyani unsound by quoting Al-Albani (1914-1999) as declaring it munkar (going against another sahih, or sound, hadith and reported to have a weak narrator) and citing imperfections in the isnad (chain of transmitters). Ibn ‘Uthaymeen also considered the hadith of Sufyaani as weak in narration. (Mansour Leghaei also has his doubts about the veracity of the story.

The scholar Wilferd Madelung writes that the prophesy of the Sufyani "as the rival and opponent of the Mahdi, has repeatedly attracted the attention of modern scholars", who trace it not to divine revelation but to enemies of the Abbasid dynasty and their various hopes that some "member of the Sufyinid branch of the house of Umayy" would lead an overthrow of the Abbasids and restore the Umayyad dynasty. Supporters of the Abbasid dynasty then turned that into a prophesy of an AntiChrist figure who would kill good Muslims.

"... The Syrians refused to admit the death of Abi Muhammad and believed that he was hiding in the mountains of al-Tā'if, from where he would reappear in triumph, a belief presumably patterned upon the Kaysini belief about Muhammad b. al-Ḥanafiyya. They created a legend with purely Syrian elements about him. Some of these are still recognizable in the garbled version fabricated by traditionists with Shi'ite and pro- 'Abbasid sentiments in which he was transformed from a Syrian hero into a figure resembling the Dajjal."

The scholar William McCants also finds a connection between Shia historical anger and the prophecy of an apocalyptic enemy named Sufyani. He writes that the Sufyani is alleged in-hadith to descend from Abu Sufyan, whose son fought Muhammad's son-in-law, Ali, for control of the Islamic empire. Ibn Abu Sufyan eventually became caliph and established the Umayyad dynasty, but followers of "the losing side", the Shia, thought that Ali should be the caliph, "began circulating words of the Prophet prophesying the new dynasty's downfall at the hands of the Mahdi" and quoted one prophecy as saying, "When the Sufyani reaches Kufa [a city in Iraq] and kills the supporters of the family of Muhammad, the Mahdi will come".

In contrast, McCants writes that while Sunnis also have prophecies about a Sufyani, some include him in a heroic mode in which he is "fighting on the side of the Mahdi against his enemies: 'The Sufyani and the Mahdi will come forth like two race horses. The Sufyani will subdue (the region) that is next to him, and the Mahdi will subdue (the region) next to him'". McCants quotes Adnan al-Arur, who hopes for the appearance of the Sufyani to lead the Sunni rebels to victory in the Syrian civil war: "God willing, all of us will be in the army of the Sufyani, who will appear in [Syria] by the permission of God" prayed Adnan al-Arur, a popular Syrian Salafi cleric and supporter of the rebellion who currently lives in Saudi Arabia.

== See also ==
- Khasf al-Bayda'
- Abu Muhammad al-Sufyani
- Al-Mubarqa
- Yamani
- Mahdi
- Al-Masih ad-Dajjal
- Islamic eschatology
- Nafs-e-Zakiyyah (Pure soul)
- Reappearance of Muhammad al-Mahdi
- Signs of the reappearance of Muhammad al-Mahdi
