= Al-Nafs al-Zakiyyah =

Character of Shia Islam

Al-Nafs al-Zakiyyah (Arabic: النفس الزكية, lit. 'the Pure Soul', Persian: نفس زکیه, romanized: Al-Nafs al-Zakiyyah), according to Shia Islamic eschatology, is one of the apocalyptic characters that Mahdi will send as his envoy to Mecca before his reappearance which will end the Major Occultation. He will be killed in Mecca and his death is one of the signs of the Mahdi in Shia Islam.

== Appellation ==
Al-Nafs al-Zakiyyah is a person by the name of Muhammad ibn al-Hasan. He is a descendant of Husayn ibn Ali. He is named Al-Nafs al-Zakiyyah because he is very pious and devout and another reason for his nickname is that he will be slain without any sin and crime.

== Duty of Al-Nafs al-Zakiyyah ==
The duty of Al-Nafs al-Zakiyyah is mentioned in a hadith that was narrated by Abu-Basir from Muhammad al-Baqir. According to the hadith, when Muhammad al-Mahdi realizes, the people of Mecca won't accept his reappearance. Therefore, he will send Al-Nafs al-Zakiyyah as an envoy to convey his oral message to people of Mecca.

== Certain sign of reappearance ==
According to narrations, the murder of Al-Nafs al-Zakiyyah is one of the certain signs of reappearance of Muhammad al-Mahdi. The hadith of Ja'far al-Sadiq mentions these signs: "there are five signs for our Dhuhur (the reappearance of the twelfth Imam), the appearance of Sufyani and Yamani, the loud cry in the sky, the martyr of Al-Nafs al-Zakiyyah, and the earth swallowing (a group of people) in the land of Beyda."

1 Loud Cry in the Sky. 2 Appearance of Sufyani. 3 Appearance of Yamani. 4 The murder of Nafs al-Zakiyyah. 5 Earth sinking in the land of Bayda.

== Place and time of murder ==
He will be slain by the people of Mecca around the Ka'ba after imparting the Imam's message to them. Ibn Babawayh in his work mentions a hadith of Ja'far al-Sadiq that says the uprising of Muhammad al-Mahdi will occur 5 days after the murder of Al-Nafs al-Zakiyyah.

According to Shia beliefs, Al-Nafs al-Zakiyyah is a sign that will occur before Muhammad al-Mahdi's appearance, who will be killed between Rukn and Maqam Ibrahim (Position of Ibrahim) in the ambit of Ka’ba. Al-Irshad contains biographies of each of the fourteen infallibles and says the reappearance of Muhammad al-Mahdi will occur at an interval of 5 days after this event.

== See also ==
- Muhammad al-Nafs al-Zakiyya
- Reappearance of Muhammad al-Mahdi
- Signs of the reappearance of Muhammad al-Mahdi
