= Signs of the appearance of the Mahdi =

Islamic eschatological event sequence

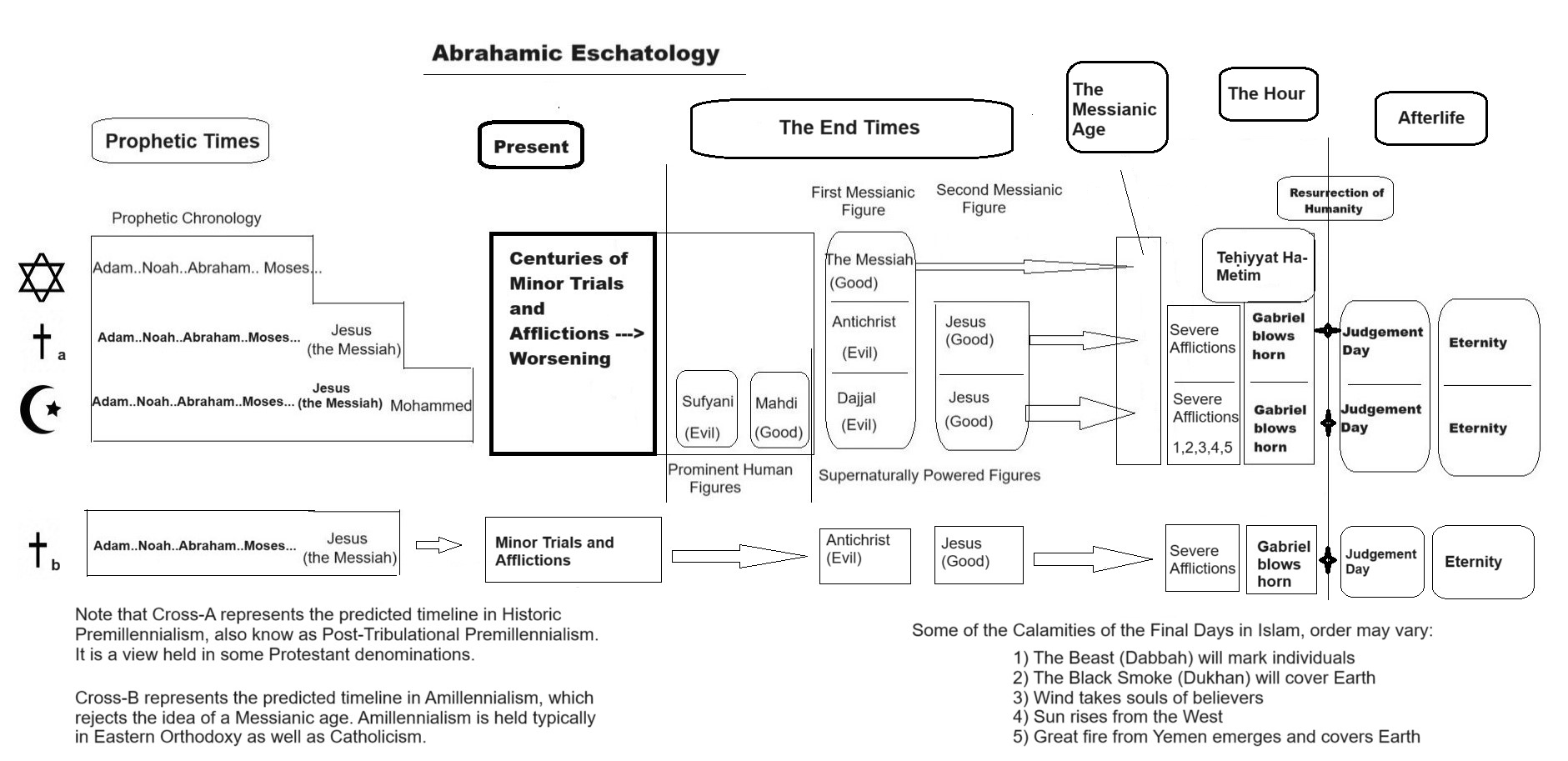
Detailed Eschatological Chart

The signs of the appearance of the Mahdi are the collection of events, according to Islamic eschatology, that will occur before the arrival of the Mahdi. The signs differ based on Sunni and Shia branches of Islam.

== Sunni signs ==
Mahdi will be among the last of the minor signs of the Day of Judgement. Therefore, all the minor signs of the Judgment Day may also be considered signs that precede the appearance of the Mahdi.

=== Minor signs ===
In Islam, the signs of the Judgment Day are divided into two categories: minor signs and major signs. The minor signs are also known in Arabic as Ashrāṭ al-Sāʿah al-Ṣughrā (Note: Ashrāṭ (أشراط): Signs, indications, or portents al-Sāʿah (الساعة): The Hour — referring to the Day of Judgment al-Ṣughrā (الصغرى): The smaller or minor). The fulfillment of the minor signs will eventually bring people closer to the major signs of the coming of the Day of Judgment in Islamic eschatology.

=== Arrival of Mahdi ===
No specific date for the arrival of the Mahdi is given in the Qur’an or the hadith. Since the arrival of the Mahdi is considered among the last minor signs of the Day of Judgment, the only way to determine whether his arrival is near is to examine the hadith concerning the minor signs of the Day of Judgment.

== Minor Signs of Judgement Day in Islam ==
1. The coming of fitna (tribulations) and removal of khushoo (fearfulness of God, reverence of God, etc.) (Note: Sahih Muslim, Book 1, Hadith 0213)
2. A person passing by a grave might say to another the following: "I wish it were my abode." (Note: Sahih Muslim, Book 41, Hadith 6947)
3. The loss of honesty, as well as authority put in the hands of those who do not deserve it. (Note: Sahih Bukhari, Volume 8, Book 076, Hadith 503)
4. The loss of knowledge and the prevalence of religious ignorance. (Note: Sahih Bukhari Volume 1, Book 3, Hadith 81)
5. Frequent, sudden, and unexpected deaths. (Note: Sahih Muslim Book 41, Hadith 7040)
6. Increase in Al-Harj (pointless killings). (Note: Sahih Bukhari Volume 9, Book 88, Hadith 184)
7. Acceleration of time. (Note: Sahih Bukhari, Vol. 2, Book 17, Hadith 146)
8. Rejection of the Hadith. (Note: Sunan Abu Dawud, Book 41, Hadith 4587)
9. The spread of riba and zina and the drinking of alcohol. (Note: Sahih Muslim Book 41, Hadith 7015)
10. Widespread acceptance of music. (Note: Sahih Bukhari Volume 7, Book 69, Hadith 494)
11. Pride and competition in the decoration of mosques. (Note: Sunan Ibn Majah, Vol. 1, Book 4, Hadith 739)
12. Women will increase in number and men will decrease in number so much so that fifty women will be looked after by one man.
13. Abundance of earthquakes. (Note: Sahih Bukhari Volume 9, Book 88, Hadith 237)
14. Frequent occurrences of disgrace, distortion, public humiliation and defamation. (Note: Al-Adab Al-Mufrad 485, Book 1, Hadith 3)
15. When people wish to die because of the severe trials and tribulations that they are suffering. (Note: Sahih Bukhari Volume 9, Book 88, Hadith 231)
16. When paying charity becomes a burden. (Note: Sahih Bukhari Volume 9, Book 88, Hadith 236)
17. People will compete in the construction of tall buildings.
18. Women will appear naked despite them being dressed. (Note: Sahih Muslim Book 40, Hadith 6840)
19. People will seek knowledge from misguided and straying scholars. (Note: Sahih Bukhari, Vol. 1, Book 3, Hadith 100 | Musnad Imam Ahmad (no.21,334 and no.21,335)
20. Liars will be believed, honest people disbelieved, and faithful people called traitors. (Note: Sunan Ibn Majah, Vol. 5, Book 36, Hadith 4036)
21. The death of righteous, knowledgeable people.
22. The emergence of indecency (obscenity) and enmity among relatives and neighbours. (Note: Musnad Ahmad)
23. The rise of idolatry and polytheists within the ummah. (Note: Jami` at-Tirmidhi, Vol. 4, Book 7, Hadith 2219 | Abu-Dawud, Book 36, Hadith 4239)
24. The Euphrates will uncover a mountain of gold. (Note: Sahih Muslim Book 041, Hadith 6918)
25. The land of the Arabs will return to being a land of rivers and fields. (Note: Sahih Muslim Book 5, Hadith 2208)
26. People will increasingly earn money by unlawful (haram) ways. (Note: Sahih Bukhari, Vol. 3, Book 34, Hadith 275)
27. There will be much rain but little vegetation. (Note: Reported by Anas and declared Sahih by Hasan al Albani)
28. Evil people will be expelled from Medina. (Note: Sahih Muslim Book 7, Hadith 3188)
29. Wild animals will communicate with humans, and humans will communicate with objects. (Note: Jami` at-Tirmidhi, Vol. 4, Book 7, Hadith 2181)
30. Lightning and thunder will become more prevalent. (Note: Ahmad)
31. There will be a special greeting for people of distinction.
32. Trade will become so widespread that a woman will help her husband in business.
33. No truly honest man will remain and no one will be trusted. (Note: Sahih Bukhari, Vol. 9, Book 88, Hadith 208)
34. Only the worst people will be left; they will not know any good nor forbid any evil (i.e. no one will say there is no god but Allah).
35. Nations will call each other to destroy Islam by any and every means.
36. Islamic knowledge will be passed on, but no one will follow it correctly. (Note: Jami` at-Tirmidhi, Vol. 5, Book 39, Hadith 2653)
37. Muslim rulers will come who do not follow the guidance and tradition of the Sunnah. Some of their men will have the hearts of devils in a human body. (Note: Sahih Muslim, Hadith 1847)
38. Stinginess will become more widespread and honorable people will perish. (Note: Mujamma'uz-Zawaa'id 7/327)
39. A man will obey his wife and disobey his mother, and treat his friend kindly while shunning his father. (Note: Sunan al-Tirmidhi, Vol. 4, Book 7, Hadith 2211 and Vol. 4, Book 7, Hadith 2210 Grade: Da'if (Darussalam))
40. Voices will be raised in the mosques. (Note: Sunan al-Tirmidhi)
41. The leader of a people will be the worst of them.
42. People will treat a man with respect because they fear the evil he could do.
43. Much wine will be drunk.
44. Muslims shall fight against a nation who wear shoes made of hair and with faces like hammered shields, with red complexions and small eyes. (Note: Sahih Muslim, Book 41, Hadith 6960)
45. The emergence of the Sufyani within the Syria region. (Note: Sahih Muslim, Book 41, Hadith 6926)
46. The truce and joint Roman-Muslim campaign against a common enemy, followed by al-Malhama al-Kubra (Armageddon), a Roman vs. Muslim war. (Note: Narrated with sound chains from Dhu Mikhbar al-Najashi by Abu Dawud, Ahmad, Ibn Majah, Ibn Hibban, and al-Hakim who declared it sahih and al-Dhahabi concurred. See Shaykh Shu`ayb Arna'ut's documentation of this hadith in his edition of Sahih Ibn Hibban (15:101–103 #6708–6709).)
47. The Black Standard will come from Khorasan (see Hadith of black flags), nothing shall turn them back until it is planted in Jerusalem. (Note: Sunan At-Tirmidhi, 2269 Grade: Da'if (Darussalam))
48. Emergence of an army, from Yemen, that will make Islam dominant. (Note: Hadith of Aden-Abyan)
49. An Arab king will die. There will be disagreement concerning succession. Then a man will emerge from Medina. He will hurry to Mecca, and the people of Mecca will come out to him and urge him and try to force him to accept the bay'ah. One of the last of the lesser signs, and which will signal the coming of the 10 major signs is the appearance of the Mahdi. (Note: Sunan Abu-Dawud : Book 36, Hadith 4273 Grade: Da'if (Al-Albani))
50. Lunar eclipse on the first night in the month of Ramadhan and solar eclipse in middle of it, with varying interpretations (1st/15th of Ramadhan) or (13th/28th of Ramadhan). It is largely accepted among past scholars.
51. Successive wars and death of many people in the world
52. Increasing injustice and corruption in the world

== Shia signs ==
According to some narrations, there are five certain signs that will occur prior to the appearance of the Mahdi. The hadith of Ja'far al-Sadiq mentions these signs: "the appearance of Sufyani and Yamani, the loud cry in the sky, the murder of Nafs-e-Zakiyyah, and the earth swallowing (a group of people) in the land of Bayda which is a desert between Mecca and Medina.

=== Loud Cry in the Sky ===
Gabriel will shout loudly and it will be heard from the sky and in other interpretations it is stated to be that "...some of the people of Mecca will come to him, bring him out against his will and swear allegiance to him between the Corner and the Maqam...". Hence, that loud cry may be actually from the people present at the Kaaba on that particular day.

=== Appearance of Sufyani ===
According to some narrations Sufyani, one of the descendants of Abu Sufyan, will arise before Mahdi's appearance. He has been depicted as an outwardly devout man that will take care to remember Allah at all times. But in reality he will be the most wicked man in the world. He will upraise during the Rajab. After he realizes that Mahdi has appeared, he will send away an army to fight him. Some books say that the army of Sufyani before getting to the army of Mahdi will sink into the earth in the Bayda, a desert between Mecca and Medina. The appearance of Sufyani is mentioned in both Shia and Sunni narrations.

=== Appearance of Yamani ===
In some narrations, the appearance of Yamani is mentioned as one of the certain signs of twelfth Imam's reappearance. The fifth Shia Imam, Muhammad al-Baqir, described Yamani in detail in a hadith:"... among these individuals (Sufyani, Yamani and Khorasani) the Yamani is the closest to guidance, for he calls the people to join the Mahdi. When he rises, the trading of weapons will be prohibited for every Muslim. When he rises, join him immediately, for his flag is the flag of guidance and prosperity and no Muslim should oppose it. Any one who does so will go to hell, because the Yamani calls to the right path." Some sources mention that the Yamani and the Khurasani will be allied against the Sufyani.

=== The loud cry in the sky ===
The third certain sign that is mentioned in the above narration is the loud cry in the sky. According to tradition two cries will be heard. In the first of them Gabriel will call the name of Al-Qa'im and his father and say that truth is with Ali and his Shia. All people will hear Jibreel's cry in their own language. In a tradition of Ja'far al-Sadiq that is narrated by Zurarah ibn A'yan, it is said that after this cry Shaitan will call certainly, so and so and their followers are victorious ones and his meaning is a man from Banu Umayya. He adds that the person who make the first cry says the truth.

=== The murder of Nafs al-Zakiyyah ===
Al-Nafs al-Zakiyyah will be one of the descendants of Husayn ibn Ali. He will be without any sin or crime; yet he will be murdered. According to many narrations, he will be the envoy of Mahdi to Mecca before his reappearance. When he arrives in Mecca and delivers his message, the people of Mecca will slay him near the Kaaba.

=== Earth sinking in the land of Bayda ===
The sinking of Sufyani's army into the earth is a certain sign of reappearance of Mahdi. In addition to above-mentioned hadith of Ja'far Sadiq, in a hadith Ali ibn Abi Talib mentions that Sufyani's army will sink into the earth, and be swallowed up, in the land of Bayda.

== See also ==
- List of Mahdi claimants
- Mahdi
- Hadith of Isa ibn Maryam Praying Behind Mahdi

== Sources ==
- Nu'mani, Muhammad ibn Ibrahim ibn Ja'far. "Chapter 14". Gheybah of Nu'mani.
- Ayatollah Muhammad Taqi Musavi al-Isfahani (7 April 2015). Mikyalul Makarim fee Fawaaid al-Duaa lil Qa'im.
- Ayatollah Ibrahim Amini (18 October 2012). "Chapter 10". Al-Imam Muhammad al-Mahdi, The just leader of humanity.
- Ali Al-Kourani (18 November 2012). Epoch of Appearance.
- Seyyed Asadullah Hashemi Shahidi (1388). Introduce of promised person. موعود شناسی و پاسخ به شبهات. Jamkaran Mosque.
- Shaykh Tusi. Al-Ghaybah.
- "Sheikh Mansour Leghaei". Ask the Sheikh. 7 March 2012.
- Sayyid Ritha Hosayni Mutlaq (22 March 2014). The last luminary and ways to delve into the light.
- Al-Ayyashi. Tafsir Ayyashi. Vol. 1.
- Muhammad Sadr. The history of Major Occultation. ISBN 964-5567-03-3.
- Majlisi, Muhammad Baqir. Bihar al-Anwar. Vol. 52.
- Ja’fari, Javad (12 July 2014). "How to distinguish Imam Muhammad al-Mahdi from false claimants?". en.abna24.com.
- "IMAM Al – MAHDI (AS) & Our Duty during his Absence". Al-Shia.org.
- "The Signs Before Reappearance of Muhammad al-Mahdi (A.S)". Al-Maaref.
