= Islamic eschatology =

Aspect of Islamic theology concerning the end times and afterlife

Islamic eschatology is the aspect of Islamic beliefs, predictions, and narratives dealing with end times. Not unlike some other Abrahamic religions, it includes both prophecies of the end of the natural world, of the dramatic events ("signs") signifying its approach; and the afterlife where the dead wait behind barzakh until they are resurrected to be judged by God (ḥisbā) for their conduct during their life on earth, and sent to their reward in either Jannah (also called heaven, paradise or the garden) or Jahannam (also called hell, the fire or hellfire).

An estimated one tenth of the Quran—the holy book of Islam—is devoted to "matters eschatological". Parts of hadīth literature and some of commentaries of various medieval Muslim scholars, including al-Ghazali, Ibn Kathir, and Muhammad al-Bukhari, among others, are devoted to the subject. Traditionally interest in "apocalyptic speculation" was strongest among mainstream Shia (Twelver Shia), Isma'ili Muslims, and Sunni Muslims on the "doctrinal and geographic margins", while weakest in the heartland of Sunni Islam. A 2012 poll of Muslims in several Muslim-majority countries (Lebanon, Turkey, Malaysia, Afghanistan, Pakistan, Iraq, Tunisia, Algeria, and Morocco) found that half or more respondents expected the Mahdi (the final redeemer according to Islam) to return during their lifetime.

Theological/doctrinal questions in Islamic eschatology include whether Quranic verses and hadith on eschatology be taken literally or figuratively; who will be sent to paradise or hell; whether consignment to hell is eternal, and if not who will be allowed to leave it; can justice be reconciled with predestination; whether heaven and hell currently exist or will be created at the end of the world; whether there is an "abode" in the afterlife other than paradise or hell, such as Al-A'raf.

== Events ==
Islam teaches that at some "undetermined time in the future" the world will end and Judgement Day will come. Based on details suggested in the Qur'an and elaborations in hadiths, manuals, and the scholarly interpretations, "a sequence of the events" can be prophesied for the day of resurrection and judgement and the time leading up to it.

Before then, individuals who die will experience the state of Barzakh, which for the sinful is known as the Punishment of the Grave and resembles hell, while the righteous will enjoy something more like paradise. (Note: There are other theories about the nature of Barzakh — that it is for those who go neither to hell nor to heaven (Al-Ghazali); the place for unborn souls (Ibn Hazm), etc.)

In the time leading up to the end of the world and Judgement Day there will be portents of their arrival in the form of a terrible "tribulation": widespread moral failings, great battles (Armageddon or fitna), natural disasters, rampaging evil forces including an Antichrist figure (the Dajjal), a violent subhuman group called Gog and Magog, a tyrant spreading corruption and mischief called the Sufyani, but also a "messianic figure" (the Mahdi, a righteous man descended from the Islamic prophet Muhammad), assisted by the prophet Jesus (ʿĪsā), who returns to earth to defeat the forces of evil and bring peace and justice throughout the world. Following these portents, a trumpet will sound and the Earth will be destroyed ("and the earth and the mountains are lifted up and crushed with a single blow", Q.69:13); a second trumpet blast will signal a "final cataclysm" (fanāʼ), which is the extinction of all living creatures.

The afterlife will commence, again with (another) trumpet blast or two, signaling the resurrection of the dead to be judged by God at the Plain of Assembly (Ard al-Hashr). The final judgment (the "Reckoning", al ḥisāb) of each soul will pit "absolute justice" against God's "merciful will". For each person there will be made a book chronicling their deeds (Kitab al-A'mal), to be examined in detail. Once the Judgment is complete, souls will travel over a bridge (as-Sirāt), the righteous proceeding to Heaven, and the wicked slipping off the side into Hell below. Not everyone consigned to Hell will remain there, as "all but the mushrikun (polytheists), have the possibility of being saved" by the intercession of Muhammad.

The pleasure and delights of Jannah and the excruciating pain and horror of Jahannam are described in "exquisite detail" in the Quran and given further elaboration in hadith and other Islamic literature. Secular scholars believe much of Islamic cosmology comes from earlier Mesopotamian and/or Jewish beliefs (the circles of damnation, seven layers of heaven above the earth, fires of purgation below) with Quranic verses interpreted to harmonize with these.

== Sources for Islamic eschatology ==
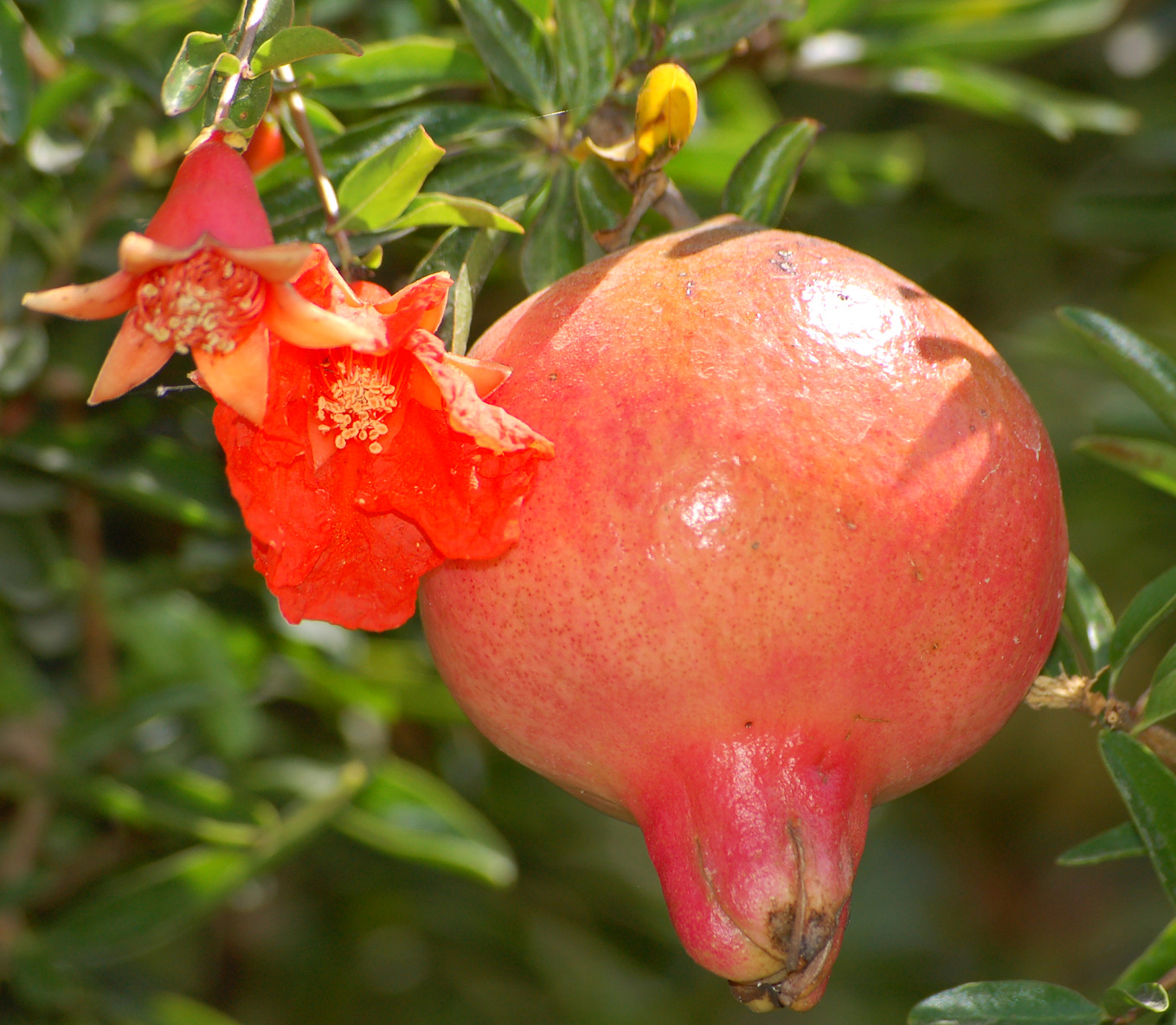
Pomegranate flower and fruit, considered a fruit from paradise in Muslim tradition. Therefore, it is used as an ingredient in a dessert (Ashure) used to commemorate prophetic events.

There is a plethora of content in Islamic sacred scriptures on the Last Judgment and the tribulation associated with it. The primary sources are the Quran itself, and ḥadīth literature. Muslims believe that the Quran is the verbatim word of Allah, promising reward to the righteous and warning those tempted to disobey his commands. The ḥadīth are accounts of the sayings and living habits attributed to the Islamic prophet Muhammad during his lifetime, believed to give more clarity, detail and comprehensive understanding of the Quran, often for scholarly purposes.

Concerning major figures of end times, the coming of al-Mahdī and al-Masīḥ ad-Dajjāl and the second coming of ʿĪsā, are mentioned in the hadith literature but not the Quran; reports about Sufyani are available in both Sunni and Shia Hadith. Yajuj and Majuj (Gog and Magog) are mentioned in two chapters of the Quran, Al Kahf and Al-Anbiya.

The Last Judgment and the tribulation have also been discussed in the commentaries of prominent classical ulama such as al-Ghazali, Ibn Kathir, and Muhammad al-Bukhari. Ibn Kathir elaborated a whole apocalyptic scenario with prophecies about the Mahdi, Jesus, and the Dajjal (the antichrist) during the end times.

== Apocalyptic literature ==
According to the branch of Islamic literature dealing with "the last days" before the apocalypse and Day of Judgement, those days will be preceded by a number of "signs", immoralities and catastrophes, as well as the advent of apocalyptic figures, both good (e.g. al-Mahdi) and evil (e.g. ad-Dajjāl). They are loosely based on the Quran and the hadith, collected around 150–200 years after the canonization of Islamic scripture and features several elements from other religions. The first known complete Islamic apocalyptic work is the Kitāb al-Fitan (Book of Tribulations) by Naim ibn Hammad. There is no canonical accepted version of the signs of the end times by either Sunnis or Shias. While interpretations of what the Quran and hadith say about the end times are "diverse and complex", the signs of Judgment Day's arrival include disruptions in the order of both human morality and the natural world; but also the appearance of Dajjāl and prophet ʿĪsā, which "is seen to represent the ultimate victory of the ummah of Islam ... in some senses".

There is no universally accepted apocalyptic tradition among either Sunnis or Shias. Traditionally, interest in "apocalyptic speculation" was strongest among mainstream Shia (Twelver Shia), Isma'ili Islam, and Sunni on the "doctrinal and geographic margins" e.g., those in present-day Morocco, but was weaker in the Sunni heartland. Various eschatological interpretations exist within Shia Islam. The concept of seven celestial Hells, as well as the idea that after death but before the End Times, one's soul would temporarily wait in either Paradise or Hellfire, are accounted for throughout Isma'ili Shi'i literature. Shia tradition broadly tends to recognize the coming of the Mahdi as signifying the coming punishment for non-believers.

The extensive usage of Hebrew and Syriac vocabulary in Islamic apocalyptic writings suggests that apocalyptic narratives formed from vivid exchange between different religious traditions. These exchanges most likely occurred orally among the masses, rather than among scholars. A lot of apocalyptic material is attributed to Ka'b al-Ahbar and former Jewish converts to Islam, while other transmitters indicate a Christian background. Christian apocalyptic literature was known at latest since the 9th century in Arabic.

Although apocalyptic literature barely cites the Quran, the narratives refer and paraphrase Islamic sacred scripture. In contrast to the method of usage of ḥadīth, apocalyptic literature dictates the Quran rather than explaining the text. Thus, David Cook suggested that at a certain point, the Quran was competing with apocalyptic literature rather than complementing it. Cook also insists the Quran is primarily an eschatological work, concerned about the impending Day of Judgement, and not an apocalyptic one.

Islamic apocalyptic narratives were later expanded and developed by Islamic authors notably Al-Shaykh Al-Mufid, al-Ghazali, Ibn Arabi, Al-Qurtubi, Ibn Kathir, and as-Suyuti). The authors list various signs as meanings of the arrivals of the apocalypse. Some references in the Quran were frequently understood as apocalyptic terms, such as fitna, Dabba, and Gog and Magog. At the time of the Mongol conquests, ibn Kathir identified the latter with the historical Turks and Mongols. The apocalyptic writings frequently feature extra-Quranic figures such as the Dajjāl (corresponding to Armilos and Anti-Christ) and the Mahdī. The Dajjāl is supposed to become a cause of misguidance and causes havoc on earth, but is ultimately stopped by either the Mahdī or ʿĪsā (Jesus) who returns to earth from heaven.

=== Questions and skepticism ===
Western scholars (William McCants, Jane Smith, Yvonne Haddad, Jean-Pierre Filiu) agree that the apocalyptic narratives are strongly connected to the early jihad wars against the Byzantine Empire and civil wars against other Muslims. McCants writes that the fitan ("tribulations") of the minor and lesser signs come from the fitan of the early Islamic civil wars (First Fitna (656–661 CE), Second Fitna (c. 680/683–c. 685/692 CE), Third Fitna (744–750/752 CE)), where Muhammad's companions (Sahabah) and successor generations (Tabi'un and Taba Tabi'in) fought each other for political supremacy. "Before and after each tribulation, partisans on both sides circulated prophecies in the name of the Prophet to support their champion. With time, the context was forgotten but the prophecies remained." Smith and Haddad also write that "the political implications of the whole millennial idea in Islam, especially as related to the understanding of the Mahdi and the rise of the 'Abbasids in the second Islamic century, are very difficult to separate from the eschatological ones." They also argue that it's "difficult to determine whether" Muḥammad "actually anticipated the arrival" the Mahdi as "an eschatological figure" – despite the fact that "most of the traditions about the Mahdi are credited to Muḥammad." Filiu has also stated that "the apocalyptic narrative was decisively influenced by the conflicts that filled Islam's early years, campaigns and jihad against the Byzantine Empire and recurrent civil wars among Muslims." Consequently, the reliability of hadith on end times has been questioned.

== Resurrection and final judgement ==
Diagram of Ard al-Hashr (the "Plain of Assembly") on the Day of Judgement, from an autograph manuscript of Futuhat al-Makkiyya written by the Sufi mystic and Muslim philosopher Ibn Arabi, ca. 1238. Shown are the ʿArsh (Throne of God), al-Aminun (pulpits for the righteous), seven rows of angels, al-Ruh (Gabriel), A'raf (the Barrier), Ḥawḍ al-Kawthar (the Pond of Abundance), al-Maqam al-Mahmud (the Praiseworthy Station, where Muhammad will stand to intercede for the faithful), Mizan (the Scale), As-Sirāt (the Bridge), Jahannam (Hell), and Marj al-Jannat (Meadow of Paradise).

In Islam, "the promise and threat" (waʿd wa-waʿīd) of Judgement Day (Arabic: یوم القيامة, romanized: Yawm al-qiyāmah, lit. 'Day of Resurrection' or Arabic: یوم الدین, romanized: Yawm ad-din, lit. 'Day of Judgement'), has been called "the dominant message" of the Quran, (Note: "as it is presented in the context" of monotheism) and is considered a fundamental tenet of faith by all Muslims, and one of the six articles of Islamic faith. The Day of Resurrection is mentioned frequently in the Quran, especially in early Meccan Surahs, when all beings, including humans, animals, and jinn, will be judged.

Two themes "central to the understanding of Islamic eschatology" are:

1. the resurrection of bodies joined with spirits in a "reunion of whole, cognizant, and responsible persons", and
2. a final judgement of the quality of each persons life "lived on earth and a subsequent recompense carried out with absolute justice through the prerogative of God's merciful will".

=== Resurrection theories ===
Although Islamic philosophers and scholars were in general agreement on a bodily resurrection after death, interpretations differ in regard to the specifications of bodily resurrection. Only a few philosophers, such as Ibn Sina, explicitly rejected bodily resurrection, arguing that true pleasure cannot be experienced through the body, and that returning to it at the time of the Greater Resurrection would be unjust. The most prominent theories on the nature of bodily resurrection are that:

- the same material body the resurrected individual had during lifetime will be restored;
- conjunction of the soul with a mithali body, which is congenial to the worlds of Barzakh and the Akhirah;
- resurrection with a hurqaliyati body, accordingly a second invisible body, that survives death.

The trials, tribulations and details associated with resurrection are detailed in the Quran and the hadith (sayings of Muhammad), and have been elaborated on in creeds (aqidahs), Quranic commentaries (tafsịrs), theological writing, and eschatological manuals to provide more details and a sequence of events on the Day. Islamic expositors and scholarly authorities who have explained the subject in detail include al-Ghazali, Ibn Kathir, Ibn Majah, Muhammad al-Bukhari, and Ibn Khuzaymah.

=== Lesser Resurrection ===
Small Resurrection (al-qiyamah al-sughra) refers to a person's death when their soul is separated from their body and begins its journey in the afterlife (akhira or malakut).

This period—known as the Barzakh—is similar to the intermediate state in Christianity. Like purgatory, its "torture of the grave" involves suffering for the sinful. It is found in epitaphs from the eighth-century and early Islamic traditions", far enough back to have achieved the "status of dogma" in the Muslim world, brought up in "invocations, funeral prayers, sermons, and popular literature".

One scholar (Leor Halevi) explains:

According to Islamic doctrine, between the moment of death and the burial ceremony, the spirit of a deceased Muslim takes a quick journey to Heaven and Hell, where it beholds visions of the bliss and torture awaiting humanity at the end of days.

By the time corpse handlers are ready to wash the body, the spirit returns to earth to observe the preparations for burial and to accompany the procession toward the cemetery. But then, before earth is piled upon the freshly dug grave, an unusual reunion takes place: The spirit returns to dwell within the body.

In the grave, the deceased Muslim - this composite of spirit and corpse - encounters two terrifying angels, Munkar and Nakir, recognized by their bluish faces, their huge teeth and their wild hair.

These angels carry out a trial to probe the soundness of a Muslim's faith. If the dead Muslim answers their questions convincingly and if he has no sin on record, then the grave is transformed into a luxurious space that makes bearable the long wait until the final judgment.

But if a Muslim's faith is imperfect or if he has sinned during life by, for example, failing repeatedly to undertake purity rituals before prayer, then the grave is transformed into an oppressive, constricting space.

The earth begins to weigh down heavily upon the sentient corpse, until the rib cage collapses; worms begin to nibble away at the flesh, causing horrible pain.

This torture does not continue indefinitely. It occurs intermittently and ends at the very latest with the resurrection - when God may well forgive Muslims who have endured the punishment.

=== Greater Resurrection ===
The greater resurrection' (al-qiyamah al-kubra) refers to the universal resurrection from the dead of all humanity to be judged by God. On this Judgement Day, the resurrected will stand in a grand assembly or place of assembly (al-maḥshar), each person's Book of Deeds – where "every small and great thing is recorded" – will be read. Each soul will be interrogated about their performance of religious duties—their īmān (faith), ṣalāt (ritual prayer), zakāt (almsgiving), ḥajj (pilgrimage), wudū', ghusl, (ritual washings) and responsibility to their relatives.

The ultimate judgement will be made and the resurrected will then walk over the bridge of As-Sirāt; those judged worthy for the Garden (paradise) continuing to their heavenly abode, those damned to The Fire (hell), falling off the bridge into the pit of Jahannam. For sinners, the bridge will be thinner than hair and sharper than the sharpest sword, impossible to walk on without falling below to arrive at their fiery destination,

A "major theme" in the stories told about Judgement Day in the Muslim community believed by both scholars and lay Muslims is the possibility of intercession (shafa'a) by Muhammad (Note: The Quran never mentions Muhammad or the office of prophethood in the 20+ times it talks about shafa'a, but it is understood in the Muslim community that he will intervene "on behalf of the Muslims on the day of judgement".) to save those Muslims condemned to hell in the Reckoning. "All but the mushrikun, those who have committed the worst sin of impugning the tawḥīd of God, have the possibility of being saved;"

=== Questions and skepticism ===
Skepticism of the concept of the resurrection of the dead has been part of both compatriots of Muhammad and the "rational and scientifically-infused" inhabitants of the contemporary world. Contemporary scholars Smith and Haddad write:

The fact of the resurrection of the body has been of continuing importance to Muslims and has raised very particular questions in certain circles of Islamic thought, such as those reflected in the later disputations between philosophy and theology. (Note: See al-Ghazali's Tahafut al-falasifa, Problem XX, "Refutation of their Denial of the Resurrection of Bodies" (tr. S. A. Kamali, [1963]), in which al-Ghazali replies point by point to objections raised by Muslim philosophers to the fact of physical resurrection. This position was countered by Ibn Rushd in his Tahafut al-tahafut, in which he contends that only the soul survives the death of the physical body.) It was not really a point of issue for early Islam, however, and bodily resurrection has never been seriously denied by orthodoxy. It is, as many have observed, basic to the message of God as proclaimed by Muhammad and articulated clearly by the Qur'an, (Note: Ash'ari theology taught that the resurrection of the body is not an element of faith common to Judaism, Christianity, and Islam, but that it was revealed in its full understanding for the first time in the Qur'an.) especially in those passages in which the contemporaries of Muhammad are presented as having scoffed or raised doubts. It continues to be, ... a point of conviction for many of the contemporary interpreters of Islam to a world in which a rational and scientifically-infused populace continues to raise the same eyebrows of skepticism as did the compatriots of the Prophet.

Early skeptics are quoted in the Quran as saying: "Are we to be returned to our former state when we have become decayed bones? They say, that would be a detrimental return!" (Q79: 10–12).

== Doctrinal/theological issues ==
Scholars have not always agreed on questions such as

- why humans believe in an afterlife;
- whether descriptions of paradise and hell, Resurrection and Judgment Day in the Quran and other Islamic literature are literal, are allegorical, or perhaps are beyond human understanding;
- whether there is a third state in the afterlife between heaven and hell;
- whether the creation of paradise and hell will wait until Judgement Day, and whether all parts of the two abodes are eternal;
- whether all actions that humans will be punished or rewarded for in the afterlife are preordained by God; (Note: (along with everything else in the universe))
- who might go to heaven or hell and why;
- whether those consigned to hell will be there for eternity.

=== Basis of belief ===
"Fear, hope, and finally ... faith", have been given (by Jane I. Smith, Yvonne Y. Haddad) as motivations offered by the Quran for the belief of Muslims in an afterlife, although some (Abū Aʿla al-Mawdūdī) have asserted it is simply a matter of reason:

The fact is that whatever Muhammad (peace be upon him) has told us about life after death is clearly borne out by reason. Although our belief in that Day is based upon our implicit trust in the Messenger of God, rational reflection not only confirms this belief but it also reveals that Muhammad's (peace be upon him) teachings in this respect are much more reasonable and understandable than all other view-points about life after death.

=== Literal or allegorical ===
Descriptions of the physical pleasures of paradise have been interpreted as allegories, symbolic of the state of joy believers will experience in the afterlife. For some theologians, even being able to see God is not a question of sight, but of awareness of God's presence. Although early Sufis, such as Hallaj, took the descriptions of paradise literally, later Sufi traditions usually stressed an allegorical meaning.

On the issue of Judgement Day, early Muslims debated whether scripture should be interpreted literally or figuratively, with a literal interpretation of the Ashʿarī school of thought eventually prevailing. It affirmed that things connected with Judgement day such as "the individual records of deeds (including the paper, pen, and ink with which they are inscribed), the bridge, the balance, and the pond" were all to be understood "in a concrete and literal sense."

In the contemporary era, according to scholars Jane I. Smith, Yvonne Y. Haddad, "the vast majority" of believers, understand verses of the Quran on Jannah (and hellfire) "to be real and specific, anticipating them" with joy or terror.

==== Modernist and postmodernist thought ====
Earlier Islamic Modernists did not accept literal interpretation. The beliefs of Pakistani modernist Muhammad Iqbal (died 1938), were similar to the Sufi "spiritual and internalized interpretations of hell" of ibn ʿArabī, and Rumi, seeing paradise and hell "primarily as metaphors for inner psychic" developments. Thus "hellfire is actually a state of realization of one's failures as a human being", and not a supernatural subterranean realm. Egyptian modernist Muhammad ʿAbduh, thought it was sufficient to believe in the existence of an afterlife with rewards and punishment to be a true believer, even if you ignored "clear" (ẓāhir) hadith about hell.

According to Smith and Haddad, "the great majority of contemporary Muslim writers, ... choose not to discuss the afterlife at all". Islamic Modernists, according to Smith and Haddad, express a "kind of embarrassment with the elaborate traditional detail concerning life in the grave and in the abodes of recompense, called into question by modern rationalists". Consequently, most of "modern Muslim Theologians" either "silence the issue" or reaffirm "the traditional position" that the afterlife is real and should not be denied but that "its exact nature remains unfathomable".

===== Gender equity in the afterlife =====
A well known series of sahih hadith narrate 'Imran bin Husain and others quoting Muhammad saying, "I was shown the Hell-fire and that the majority of its dwellers are women." In opposition to this, Amina Wadud notes that the Qur'an does not mention any specific gender when talking about hell. Verse Q.43:74–76, for example, states that "the guilty are immortal in hell's torment". When discussing paradise, the Quran includes women, Q.3:14–15, for example, states that "Beautiful of mankind is love of the joys (that come) from women and offspring..."

=== "Limbo" or al-aʿrāf in Islam ===
In terms of classical Islam, "the only options" afforded by the Qur'an for the resurrected are an eternity of horrible punishments of The Fire (hell) or the delightful rewards of The Garden (paradise). Islamic tradition has raised the question of whether or not consignment to The Fire is eternal, or eternal for all, but "has found no reason to amend" the limit of two options in the afterlife. However, one verse in the Quran has "led to a great deal of speculation concerning the possibility of a third place".

- There will be a barrier [ḥijāb] between paradise and hell. And on the heights [al-aʿrāf] of that barrier˺ will be people who will recognize ˹the residents of˺ both by their appearance. They will call out to the residents of paradise, "Peace be upon you!" They will have not yet entered paradise, but eagerly hope to (Q.7:46).

This has been called the "Limbo" theory of Islam, as described by Jane Smith and Yvonne Haddad. It implies that some individuals are not immediately sent to The Fire or The Garden, but are held in a state of limbo. Smith and Haddad believe it is "very doubtful" that the Qur'anic meant for al-aʿrāf to be understood as an abode for those deceased in an "intermediate category", but this has come to be "the most commonly held interpretation".

As for who the inhabitants of al-aʿrāf are, the "majority of exegetes" support the theory that they are those whose actions in dunya were balanced – whose good deeds keep them from the Fire and whose evil deeds keep them from the Garden. After everyone else has been let into the Garden, and if the mercy of their Lord permits it, they will be allowed in.

=== Predestination ===
Orthodox Islam teaches the doctrine of Qadar (Arabic: قدر, aka Predestination, or divine destiny in Islam), whereby everything that has happened and will happen in the universe—including sinful human behavior—is commanded by God. At the same time, we human beings are responsible for our actions and rewarded or punished for them in the Afterlife.

Qadar/predestination/divine destiny, is one of Sunni Islam's six articles of faith and is mentioned in the Quran in verses such as:

- "Nothing will ever befall us except what Allah has destined for us" (Q.9:51).
- "Allah leaves whoever He wills to stray and guides whoever He wills." (Q.14:4).

Of course, the fate of human beings in the afterlife is especially crucial. It is reflected in Quranic verses such as

- Had We willed, We could have easily imposed guidance on every soul. But My Word will come to pass: I will surely fill up Hell with jinn and humans all together. (Q.32:13).

Muhammad also talked about the doctrine of predestination multiple times during his mission according to hadith. Thus the consensus of the Sunni Muslim community has been that scripture indicates predestination. Nonetheless, some Muslim theologians have argued against predestination, (including at least some Shia Muslims, whose article of faith includes Adalah (justice), but not Qadar. (At least some Shia – such as Naser Makarem Shirazi – denounce the doctrine of predestination).

Opponents of predestination in early Islam, (al-Qadariyah, Muʿtazila) argued that if everything that will ever happen has already determined, God's human creation cannot really be free to make decisions to do good or evil, or be in control of whether they suffer eternal torment in Jahannam—which is something that (the opponents believe) a just God would never allow to happen. While Qadar is the consensus of Muslims, it is also an issue scholars discourage debate and discussion about. Hadith narrate Muhammad warning his followers to "refrain from speaking about qadar"; and according to the creed of Al-Tahawi, "the principle of providence" is such a secret that God did not let even angels, prophets and messengers in on the mystery.

=== Creation of heaven and hell ===
==== Whether heaven and hell have already been created ====
Islam, like Christianity, conceptualizes the relationship between Dunyā (temporal world) and Ākhirah (hereafter) in a diachronic timeline. Humanity's history in the world (dunya) begins with the Fall of Adam and ends with God's Judgement, after which the world is no more and humanity is sent to heaven or hell—the akhirah.

This might suggest that akhirah follows dunya. The Mu'tazila believed so, arguing that God creates only with a purpose, and since all except God will be destroyed by the trumpet before the Day of Resurrection, paradise and hell would have no function until Judgement Day, after the annihilation of the world, and so must be created afterwards.

Others disagree. Māturīdism objects, asserting that paradise and hell do fulfill the before mentioned functions. Ash'ariya argue that although the trumpet's sounding will precede all being destroyed, creation was a "constant process". Furthermore, Islamic literature is filled with interactions between the world and the hereafter and the world is closely intertwined with both paradise and hell. Muhammad visited during his Miʿrāj (Night Journey) both paradise and hell. The same is said about the Islamic prophet ʾIdrīs. The palm-tree as well as the pomegranate are supposed to originate from paradise. A Walī (saint) grabs a pomegranate out of a vision from paradise. Muhammad reportedly states that river flows from hell. The infernal tree Zaqqum manifests in this world. Some animals, scorpions and snakes in particular, are said to travel between the world and hell. People may interact with the souls of the deceased, receive blessings, or ease the dead's abode in the otherworld. Māturīdi scholar Abu al-Layth al-Samarqandi (944–983) explains that the otherworldly abodes coexist in order to inspire hope and cause fear.

The overlap of the earthly and otherworldly domain is anchored in the Quran itself. Challenging the pre-Islamic Arabian conception of time (dahr) as a linear and irreversible process, time has become subject to God. According to Lange, the Quran in general "is lacking a notion of time as divided into past, present and future." Therefore, Quranic eschatology cannot be understood through a linear conceptualization of time. The difference between the earth and the otherworld is not that of time but rather that of space. Paradise and hell are spatially connected to earth. At Judgement Day, paradise and hell do not perish, nor are they created anew, rather paradise and hell are "brought near" (26:90-91) Before that event, paradise is suggested to be somewhere in the high regions of the world and hell located in the depths.

Muslim theologians (mutakallimun) referred to multiple verses of the Quran for evidence that paradise and hell coexist with the current world. It is implied someone has gone to the Garden or the hell (3:169, 36:13-26, 66:10, 3:10-11, 6:93). In the Story of Adam and Eve, they once resided in Garden of Eden, which is often considered to be Jannah. This identification, however, is not universal. Al-Balluti (887 – 966) reasoned that the Garden of Eden lacked the perfection and eternal character of a final paradise: Adam and Eve lost the primordial paradise, while the paradisiacal afterlife lasts forever; if Adam and Eve were in the otherworldly paradise, the devil (Shaiṭān) could not have entered and deceived them, since there is no evil or idle talk in paradise; Adam slept in his garden, but there is no sleep in paradise.

The discussion may have been incited by Jahm bin Ṣafwān who claimed that paradise and hell will end, but coexist with the world. Insisting on the impermanence of everything but God, he asserts that "eternity" is used hyperbolically and means that people abide in paradise and hell only as long as both worlds last. Most Sunnis, however, hold the opinion that paradise and hell are eternal.

==== Whether hell, or some parts of it, are not eternal ====
In Classical Islam, there was a consensus among the theological community regarding the finality of jannah (also called heaven, paradise, the gardens); after Judgement Day, faithful servants of God would find themselves here for eternity. However, some practitioners in the early Muslim community held that the other abode of the hereafter (hell/jahannam), or at least part of that abode, might not be eternal. This belief was based upon interpretations of scripture that hell, or at least the upper levels of hell, would eventually be empty as all its inhabitants would eventually be admitted into Paradise, so the need for their existence would be gone. These interpretations are centered on verses 11:106–107 in the Quran, stating,

"As for those who are wretched, they shall be in the Fire, wherein there shall be for them groaning and wailing, abiding therein for so long as the heavens and the earth endure, save as thy Lord wills. Surely thy Lord does whatsoever He wills".

The possibility that God may ultimately commute a sentence to hell suggests that it may serve a function analogous to purgatory in Christianity. Arguments questioning the permanence of hell take the view that hell is not necessarily solely there to punish the evil, but to purify their souls, whereas the purpose of the Garden is simply to reward the righteous. Evidence against the concept of hell being in part temporary, is the Quran verse stating that hell will endure as long as Heaven will, which has been established as eternal.

=== Who will enter heaven or hell ===
Scholars do not all agree on who will end up in jannah and who in jahannam, and the criteria for which one. Issues include whether all Muslims, even those who've committed major sins, will end up in jannah; and whether any non-Muslims will go to jannah.

According to the Quran, the basic criterion for salvation in the afterlife is the belief in the oneness of God (tawḥīd), angels, revealed books, messengers, as well as repentance to God, and doing good deeds (amal salih). This is qualified by the doctrine that ultimately salvation can only be attained through God's judgement.

==== Muslims, jinn, angels, devils ====
Muslim scholars mostly agree that ultimately all Muslims will be saved, but disagree about the possibility for salvation of non-Muslims.

The idea that jinn as well as humans could find salvation was widely accepted. Like humans, their destiny in the hereafter depends on whether they accept God's guidance. The surah Al-Jinn says:

And among us are those who have submitted ˹to Allah˺ and those who are deviant. So ˹as for˺ those who submitted, it is they who have attained Right Guidance. And as for the deviant, they will be fuel for Hell.'" (Q.72:14-15)

Angels, who are not subject to desire and do not commit sin, are found in paradise. The devils cannot return to paradise, because Islamic scripture states that their father, the fallen angel Iblis, was banished, but never suggests that he or his offspring were forgiven or promised to return.

==== Early Muslim thought on damnation ====
One of the primary beliefs pertaining to Islamic eschatology during the early Muslim period was that all humans could receive God's mercy and were worthy of salvation. These early depictions even show how small, insignificant deeds were enough to warrant mercy. Most early depictions of the end of days describe only those who reject Tawhid, (monotheism), as being subject to eternal punishment. However, everybody is held responsible for their actions. Concepts of reward and punishment were seen as beyond this world, a view that is also held today.

==== Whether some non-Muslims' will be able to enter paradise ====
Scholars and schools of Islam have a variety of opinions on the subject.

===== Notable scholars =====
Muslim scholars arguing in favor of non-Muslims being able to enter paradise cite the verse:

- "Indeed, those who believed and those who were Jews or Christians or Sabians—those who believed in Allah and the Last Day and did righteousness—will have their reward with their Lord, and no fear will there be concerning them, nor will they grieve," (Q.2:62).

Those arguing against non-Muslim salvation regard this verse to have applied only until the arrival of Muhammad, after which it was abrogated by another verse:

- "And whoever desires other than Islam as religion—never will it be accepted from him, and he, in the Hereafter, will be among the losers. (Q.3:85).

Although the Quran acknowledges the Bible as gospel, rejecting Muhammad and his message is seen as a rejection of salvation by them.

According to Mohammad Hassan Khalil, on the subject of whether self-proclaimed non-Muslims might be allowed into Jannah, Islamic theologians can be classified as

- 'Exclusivists' – who maintain that only Muslims will be saved.
- 'Inclusivists' – who also affirm that Islam is the only path to heaven, but that some who do not call themselves Muslims will go to Jannah because there is actually Islam under a different name.
- 'Pluralists' – assert that there are several religious traditions or interpretations that are equally effective saving their adherents from damnation, regardless of the circumstances.
- 'Universalists' – believe that after a 'significant' period of time and suffering, even the most foul of hell's inhabitants will have been admitted into heaven.

(In addition there are those who could be described as 'interim inclusivists' or 'ultimate universalists'.)

Based on these categories, four "well-known and particularly influential Muslim thinkers" can be sorted as:

- al-Ghazālī – "optimistic" or "liberal inclusivist";
- Ibn al-ʿArabī – "liberal inclusivist" to "quasi-universalist";
- Ibn Taymiyya and
- Ibn Qayyim al-Jawziyya – both universalists, (despite their status as "darlings" of "many who call themselves Salafīs");
- Rashīd Riḍā – a lenient inclusivist to cautious universalist;
- Ibn Hazm – "proclaimed that even the most upright and flawless moral-ethical monotheist is damned to hell if he knows anything about a person named Muḥammad or a religion called Islam and does not join, while even the most brutal and immoral person who converts sincerely to Islam the moment before he dies, is saved". Furthermore, "any Muslim who does not agree is not a Muslim himself."

===== Ash'arism =====
The theology of Ash'arism (Note: Ashʿarism (/æʃəˈriː/; Arabic: أشعرية: al-ʾAshʿarīyah), one of the main Sunni schools of Islamic theology, founded by the Islamic scholar, Shāfiʿī jurist, Abū al-Ḥasan al-Ashʿarī in the 10th century,) emphasizes God's mercy rather than God's wrath, and the likelihood of salvation for Muslims, but holds that God is neither obligated to punish disobedience nor to reward obedience.

Ash'aris believe revelation is necessary to understand good and evil, as well as religious truths. Accordingly, revelation is necessary to reach moral and religious truths and thus, people who hear from a prophet or messenger are obligated to follow the revealed religion. However, those who have not received revelation are not obligated, and can hope for salvation.

Ash'arite scholar al-Ghazali distinguished between the "saved" (from hell by al-Araf or Jannah) and "those who will attain success" (enter Jannah). He divided non-Muslims into three categories for purposes of the afterlife according to Mohammad Hassan Khalil:

1. Those who never heard the message of Islam, who live in far away lands, such as the Byzantines ("Romans"). These will be forgiven.
2. Those who were only exposed to a distorted understanding of Islam and had no opportunity to hear the correct version. These too will be forgiven. Members of the first two groups who are righteous will neither enter hell nor Jannah, but will stay in al-Araf).
3. People who heard of Islam because they lived in neighboring lands and/or mixed with Muslims. Only this group has no hope of salvation, and will be punished.

===== Maturidism =====
Scholars of the Maturidi school (Note: Māturīdism (Arabic: الماتريدية: al-Māturīdiyyah) is also one of the main Sunni schools of Islamic theology developed and formalized by the Islamic scholar, Ḥanafī jurist Abū Manṣūr al-Māturīdī in the 10th century.) are thought to have been less optimistic about the chances of sinners entering paradise than Ash'aris, but more optimistic than Muʿtazila. They generally acknowledge that even Muslims who have committed grave sins will enter paradise after an appropriate period of punishment in hell; that everyone with normal intellectual capacities is responsible for believing in a creator even if they haven't heard about Muhammad or any other prophetic mission, and that religious truths and the concepts of good and evil can be grasped by reason alone.

In other regards scholars believe Maturidi have different opinions on the afterworld fate of non-Muslims. While some (like Rifat Atay) regard Māturīdism to be exclusivistic, only allowing people who are Muslims to enter paradise, others argue that Māturīdi understood that "to believe in Islam" could mean having a subjective conceptualization of God and his laws by reason alone. Accordingly, people are judged by their degree of understanding God's universal law, not by their adherence to a particular belief system. In modern times, Yohei Matsuyama largely agrees with this interpretation. According to Abu'l-Qasim Ishaq, children cannot be considered unbelievers, thus all of them go to paradise.

===== Muʿtazila =====
The theology of Muʿtazila (Note: (Arabic: المعتزلة al-muʿtazilah)) emphasized God's justice, and the free will and responsibility of each human being for their actions. They have been called the "best known exponents" of Qadariyah, the idea that human beings must have free will otherwise it would be unjust to punish or reward them for their actions. Compared to Maturidi and Ashʿarī, Muʿtazila had the least amount of "salvific optimism", as they stressing individual accountability, rejecting intercession (Shafa'a) on behalf of sinners by Muhammad. The "divine threat" (al-wa'id) and "divine promise" (al wa'd) became key tenets of the Mu'tazilites, who stressed that justice required that they applied to both Muslims and non-Muslims. This meant that those who committed grave or heinous sins (Kabirah), even Muslims, might denied entry to paradise forever. The only way for a grave sinner to be forgiven, many theologians believed, is by repentance (tawba). Mu'tazilites believed God's justice obligated Him to forgive those who had repented (other schools believed He was not so constrained).

===== Twelver Shia =====
Like most Sunni, Shia Islam hold that all Muslims will eventually go to Jannah. (Note: Sayyed Mohammad Al-Musawi quotes: Shaikh al-Mufeed: The Imami (Shia) scholars are unanimous that remaining in hellfire for ever is for the Kuffaar only and not for the major sinners from those who believe in Allah.; Shaikh al-Sadouq: The Hellfire is the place of those who did not believe in Allah and some of the believers in Allah who committed major sins but they will not remain in it. No one will remain in Hellfire for ever but the non believers.)

On the fate of non-Muslims in the hereafter, Shia Islam (or at least cleric Ayatullah Mahdi Hadavi Tehrani of Al-Islam.org), takes a view similar to Ash'arism. Tehrani divides non-Muslims into two groups: the heedless and stubborn who will go to hell and the ignorant who will not "if they are truthful to their own religion":

1. Those who are termed 'Jahil-e-Muqassir' (lit. 'culpable ignorant' – jahil suggesting unbelief rather than literal ignorance). These are non-believers to whom the message of Islam has reached and who have understood its truthfulness. However, they are not prepared to accept the truth due to their obstinacy and stubbornness. This group deserves to be punished in hell.
2. Those who are termed 'Jahil-e-Qasir' (lit. 'inculpable ignorant'). These are non-believers to whom the message of Islam has not reached, or it has been presented to them in an incomplete or erroneous manner. Such people will attain salvation if they are truthful to their own religion.

(At least one Twelver Shia scholar 'Allama al-Hilli, insists that not only will non-Muslims be damned but suggests Sunni Muslim will be as well, as it is not possible for any Muslim to be ignorant of "the imamate and of the Return", and thus "whoever is ignorant of any of them is outside the circle of believers and worthy of eternal punishment." This statement is not indicative of all Shia eschatological thought.)

Also like mainstream schools, and unlike Muʿtazila, Twelver Shia hold that Jannah and Jahannam "exist at present ... according to the Qur`an and ahadith". However, they will not "become fully apparent and represented" until Judgement Day. As for three other issues in Islamic eschatology:

- the differences between Adam and Eve's Garden of Eden,
- "the heaven or hell of one's actions which envelopes a person"; and
- the Barzakh state of "purgatory" in Islam after death and before Resurrection; in Shia Islam,

these three "types" of jannah (or Jahannam) are "all simply manifestations of the ultimate, eternal heaven and hell".

===== Islamic Modernism and Salafism =====
Modernist scholars Muhammad Abduh and Rashid Rida rejected the notion that the People of the Book (usually described as Jews and Christians) would be excluded from Jannah, based on verse Q.4:123-124 (see above). The Fate of the unlearned is also a matter of dispute within Islamic theology. Like many modern scholars advocated, including Mawlana Ali, Ismail Hakki Izmirli, and Yusuf al-Qaradawi, Muhammad Abduh and Rashid Rida asserted the doctrine of a finite hell fanāʾ al-nār ("demise of hell").

Turkish theologian Süleyman Ateş cites the Quranic verse 5:66 to argue that there are good and bad people in any religion, and that some Muslims may not enter paradise, but those who believe without doubt in the hereafter and a God without partners, and who do good and useful deeds may enter paradise, whatever their religions.

Neo-Salafi commonly reject inclusive salvation theories. For example, Salafi scholar Umar Sulaiman Al-Ashqar, like proto-Salafi ibn Qayyim, rejects the doctrine of fanāʾ al-nār. He interprets the hadith that will be 73 Islamic sects from which only one will be saved in accordance with his belief that only those who stick close to the Quran and the Sunnah go to paradise, while those he considers deviant, such as Muʿtazila and Kharijites go to hell temporarily, while "extreme" groups such as Isma'ilis, Alevites, and Druze, go to hell forever. Al-Ashqar elaborates on a hadith that "most inhabitants of hell are women" that women are more likely to go to hell due to intellectual deficiencies, but adds that despite their flaws, there are also many good and pious women.

== Contemporary popular interest in Islamic eschatology ==
Prior to the 20th century, Islam had "strongly emphasized the hereafter" (ākhira). Desire to counter colonialism and "achieve material and technological parity with the West" turned modern thinkers to stress this world (dunyā), without suggesting ākhira was less important. The focus on end times/eschatology in Islam has tended to occur among those less exposed to scholarly learning. In the 1980s however, it again became much more popular generally. Islamic leaders and scholars have always urged Muslim to be prepared for Judgement Day, but "the particulars of the end of the world are not a mainstream concern in Islam," according to Graeme Wood. (Note: Smith and Haddad write, the "great majority of contemporary Muslim writers, ... choose not to discuss the afterlife at all. They are satisfied with simply affirming the reality of the day of judgment and human accountability without providing any details or interpretive discussion.)

However, in 2012 poll conducted by the Pew Research Center found that 50% or more respondents in several Muslim-majority countries (Lebanon, Turkey, Malaysia, Afghanistan, Pakistan, Iraq, Tunisia, Algeria, and Morocco) expected the Mahdi (the final redeemer according to Islam) to return during their lifetime. The expectation is most common in Afghanistan (83%), followed by Iraq (72%), Turkey (68%), Tunisia (67%), Malaysia (62%), Pakistan (60%), Lebanon (56%), and Muslims in southern Thailand (57%).

Stories of end times and doomsday tend to be passed on as bedtime stories or informal talk among the lay Muslims, rather than in the Imam's Friday khutbah. "Even Muslims with low levels of knowledge have heard parts of parts of it", according to scholar Jean Pierre Filiu. (Note: In conversation to Graeme Wood.) In Islamic bookstores, their "dramatic and sensational stories of final battles between good and evil, supernatural powers, the ultimate rise of a Muslim elite," are naturally more attention getting than more orthodox/studious works on prayer, purity or the lives of exemplary Muslims. More official Muslim sources have often either kept quiet about apocalyptic hadith or outright denied their existence—an example being Nihad Awad of the Council on American-Islamic Relations who insists there "is no apocalyptic bloodbath in Islam."

Popular Kurdish/Turkish revivalist Said Nursi highlighted the concept of Sufyani instead of Dajjal and applied numerologic methods to some Āyah/hadith fragments, making signs of his followers community as Mahdi (Note: (Collective ID; Sahs al-manawi") Even more important is the realization of some of the difficulties and needs of the modern era, the Mahdi thought, contrary to the classical sources are defended by a "person" from the "spiritual personal" name is given to his community.) and possible dates for apocalypse.

Popular Islamic pamphlets and tracts on the End Times have always been in circulation, but until around 2010 their "impact on political and theological thinking was practically nil" among Sunnis. Interest in the End Times is particularly strong among jihadis and "since the mid-2000s, the apocalyptic currents in jihadism have surged." As of 2011, the belief that the end of the world is at hand and will be precipitated by an apocalyptic Great Battle has been noted as a "fast-growing belief in Muslim countries" though still a minority belief. (Note: from blurb for Filiu, Jean-Pierre (2011). Apocalypse in Islam. Translated by DeBevoise, M. B. Berkeley: University of California Press. ISBN 978-0-520-26431-1.)

=== Shiʿi Islam ===
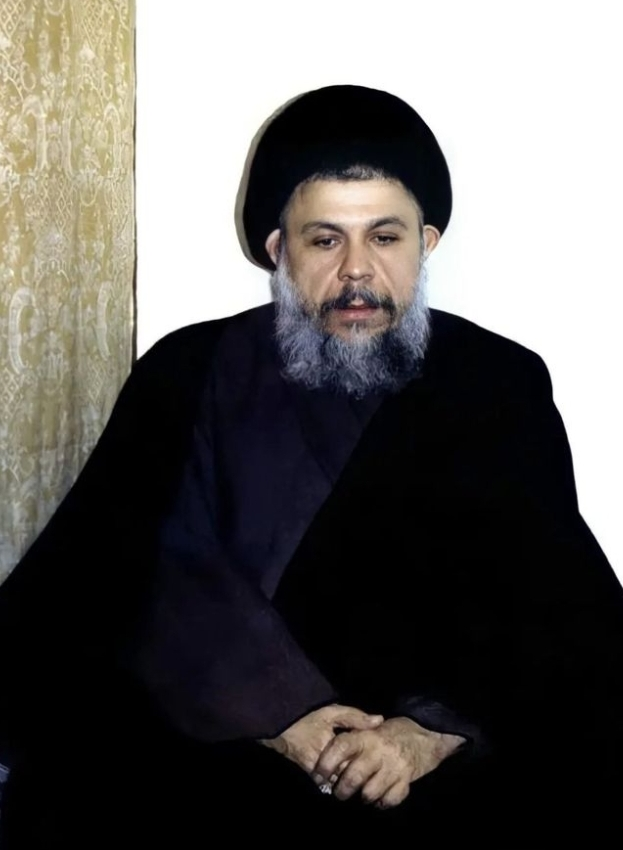
Muhammad Baqir al-Sadr

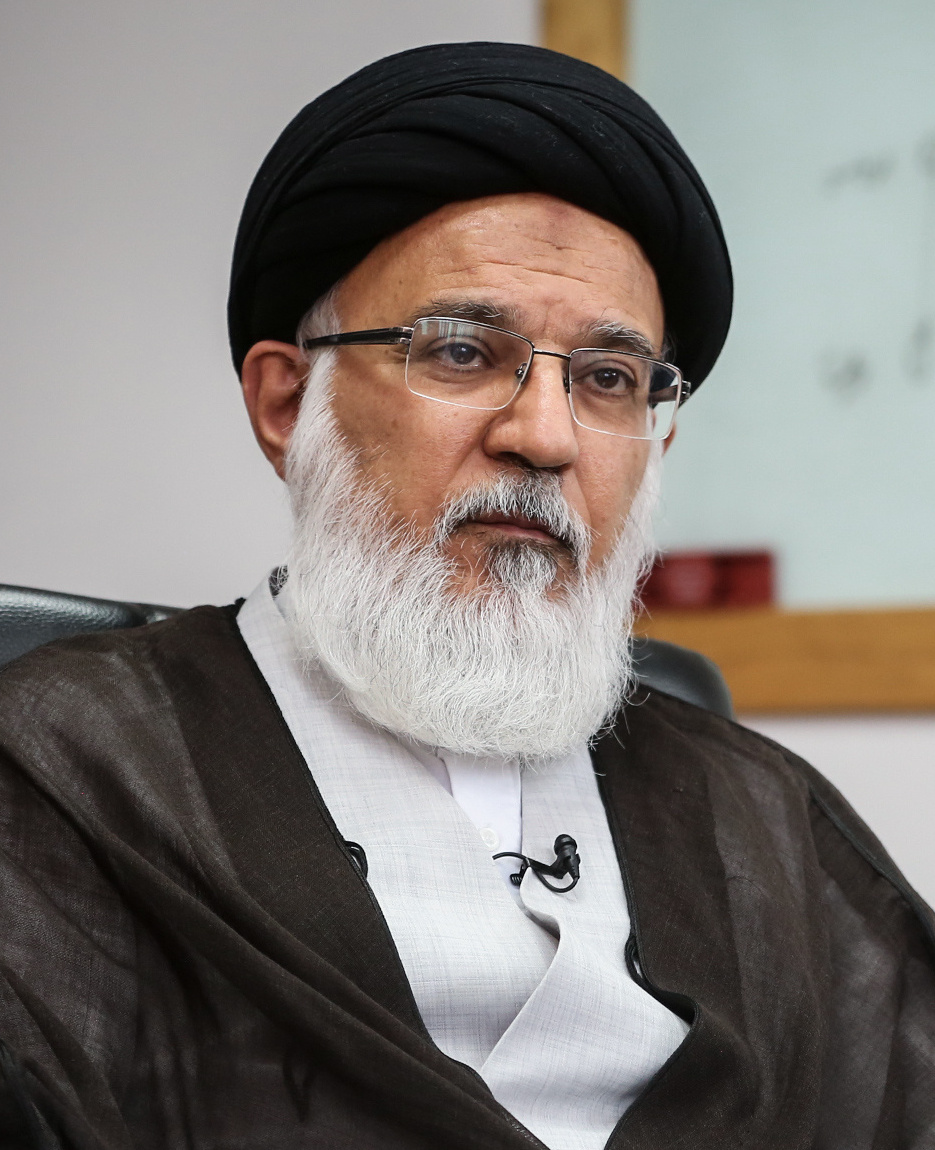
Mahdi Mirbaqiri

One Shiʿi Ayatollah, Muhammad Baqir al-Sadr, revered as "the fifth martyr" of Shiʿi Islam (killed by Saddam Hussein in 1980), went to the trouble of trying to explain how the Hidden Imam could be over 1000 years old, and why the present is a propitious time for the reappearance of him. Muqtada al-Sadr's Mahdi army waged a violent struggle against the American military through 2004, and its ranks swelled with thousands of recruits. Muqtada's political faction won seats in parliament.

According to J.-P. Filiu, the uprising of the (Shiʿi) Mahdi Army (2003–08) in Iraq and July 2006 war between Israel and (Shiʿi) Hizbullah are "at least in part" a consequence of "mounting eschatological expectations" coming from copious literature preaching that the return of the Hidden Imam was imminent; literature emanating from the Shiʿi seminaries and scholars of holy city of Najaf, Iraq, from Lebanon, and from Iran during the administration of its president Mahmoud Ahmadinejad. During Mahmoud Ahmadinejad's presidency (2005–2013), he shared with Iranians his "avowed conviction" that believers must actively work for the Mahdi's reappearance, despite this bringing him "into conflict with the highest authorities of Shiism".

In 2026, Iranian Shia cleric and politician Mahdi Mirbaqiri said in an interview that he wants to accelerate the end of times by inspiring "widespread fighting" and a "comprehensive clash" with the Western world. He believes that conflict between "believers and infidels" is inevitable.

=== Popular apocalyptic literature ===
"Dramatic and sensational stories" of the apocalypse first made an impact in the mid-1980s when Said Ayyub's Al-Masīh al-Dajjāl (The Anti-Christ) started a whole new genre of Islamic "apocalyptic fiction" or "millenarian speculation" throughout the Arab world. The book was so successful Ayyub went on to write a half-dozen other spinoff books, inspired imitators who enjoyed even greater success (Muhammad Izzat Arif, Muhammad Isa Dawud, and Mansur AbdelHakim).

The book (and the genre) was noteworthy for rupturing the "organic link between Islamic tradition and the last days of the world", using Western sources (such as Gustave Le Bon and William Guy Carr) that previously would have been ignored; and lack of Sahih Bukhari (i.e. top quality) hadith (he does quote Ibn Kathir and some hadith "repeated at second hand"); and for an obsessively anti-Jewish point of view ("in all great transformations of thought, there is a Jewish factor, avowed and plain, or else hidden and secret", "the Jews are planning the Third World War in order to eliminate the Islamic world and all opposition to Israel", and cover art featuring a grotesque cartoon figure with a Star of David and large hooked nose).

Unlike traditional popular works of Islamic eschatology that kept close to scripture and classical manuals of eschatology in describing al-Dajjāl, Said Ayyub portrayed the Dajjāl as 1) the true Jewish messiah, that Jews had been waiting for, 2) a figure who will appear or reappear not only in end times, but one who has been working throughout the history of humanity to create havoc with such diabolical success that human history is really "only a succession of nefarious maneuvers" by him. Intermediaries of al-dajjal (according to Ayyub) include St. Paul the Apostle, who (Ayyub maintains) created Christianity by distorting the true story of Jesus, the Emperor Constantine who made possible "the Crusader state in service to the Jews", the Freemasons, Napoleon, the United States of America, Communists, Israel, etc. He concludes that the dajjal is hiding in Palestine (but will also "appear in Khurasan as the head of an expansionist state") and the Great Battle between Muslims and his forces will be World War III fought in the Middle East.

Later books, The Hidden Link between the AntiChrist, the Secrets of the Bermuda Triangle, and Flying Saucers (1994), by Muhammad Isa Dawud, for example, move even farther away from traditional themes, disclosing that the Anti-Christ journeyed from the Middle East to the archipelago of Bermuda in the 8th century CE to make it his home base and from whence he fomented the French Revolution and other mischief, and now sends flying saucers to patrol Egypt and prepare for his eventual triumphal return to Jerusalem.

The success of the genre provoked a "counteroffensive" by pious conservatives (Abdellatif Ashur, Muhammad Bayyumi Magdi, and Muhammad Shahawi) disturbed by the liberties Said Ayyub and others had taken with Islamic doctrine.

=== Jihadist references ===
In the early 1980s, when Abdullah Azzam, called on Muslims around the world to join the jihad in Afghanistan, he considered the fight "to be a sign that the end times were imminent". Also around that time, popular Islamic writers, such as Said Ayyub, started blaming Islamic decline in the face of the Western world, not on lack of technology and development, but on the forces of the Dajjal.

Al-Qaeda used "apocalyptic predictions in both its internal and external messaging" according to Jessica Stern, and its use of "the name Khorasan, a region that includes part of Iran, Central Asia, and Afghanistan, and from which, it is prophesied, the Mahdi will emerge alongside an army bearing black flags", was thought to be a symbol of end times. But these claims were "mostly symbolic", and according to Wood, Bin Laden "rarely mentioned" the Apocalypse and when he did, "he implied he would be long dead when it arrived" (a reflection of his more "elite" background according to Will McCants). According to J.-P. Filiu, out of the mass of Al-Qaeda documents seized after the fall of the Taliban, only one letter made any reference to the apocalypse.

A prominent jihadist, Abu Musʿab al-Sūri, (called a "sophisticated strategist" and "articulate exponent of the modern jihad"), somewhat independent and critical of Al-Qaeda, was also much more interested in end times. He wrote, "I have no doubt that we have entered into the age of battles and tribulations [zāman al-malāhim wal-fitan]" He devoted the last 100 pages of his magnum opus on jihad (A Call to Global Islamic Resistance, made available online around 2005) to matters such as the proper chronology and location of related battles and other activities of the Mahdi, the Antichrist, the mountain of gold to be found in the Euphrates river, the Sufyani, Gog and Magog, etc.

Abu Musʿab al Zarqawi, the founder of what would become the Islamic State "injected" the apocalyptic message into jihad. ISIS has evoked "the apocalyptic tradition much more explicitly" than earlier jihadis. Dabiq, Syria – a town understood "in some versions" of the eschatological "narrative to be a possible location for the final apocalyptic battle" – was captured by ISIS and made its capital. ISIS also declared its "intent to conquer Constantinople" – Muslims conquering Constantinople being another end times prophesy. Interviews by The New York Times, and Jurgen Todenhöfer with many dozens of Muslims who had traveled to fight with Islamic State, and by Graeme Wood with Islamic State supporters elsewhere, found "messianic expectation" a strong motivator to join Islamic State.

Shiʿi Islam

While Al-Qaeda and Islamic State are Sunni, Shia insurgents/militants have also been "drawn to the battlefield" by "apocalyptic belief", according to William McCants, who quotes a Shia fighter in Iraq saying, "'I was waiting for the day when I will fight in Syria. Thank God he chose me to be one of the Imam's soldiers.'"

Some dissident Shiʿa in Iraq, oppose not only Sunni, US and Iraqi government forces, but the Shiʿi religious hierarchy as well. In Najaf, in late January 2007, at least 200 were killed in the Battle of Najaf, when several hundred members of an armed Iraqi Shi'a messianic sect known as the Soldiers of Heaven or Jund As-Samāʾ(Arabic: جند السماء), allegedly attempted to start a "messianic insurrection" during the holy day of Ashura in the holy city of Najaf; planning to disguise themselves as pilgrims and kill leading Shi'a clerics. The group allegedly believed that spreading chaos would hasten the return of the 12th Imam/Mahdi, or alternately, that their leader, Dia Abdul Zahra Kadim, was the awaited Mahdi. The next year during Ashura a reported 18 officers and 53 militia members were killed in clashes between "millenarian rebels" and police, the violence blamed on followers of one Ahmad al-Hassan, a man claiming the Hidden Iman had designated him as his (the Hidden Imam's) representative (wassi), and who accused Ayatollahs/Shia clerics of being guilty of "aberration and treason, of occupation and tyranny".

=== Islamic State claims of prophecy fulfilment ===
Jihadis of the Islamic State see the fulfillment of many of the "lesser signs" of the coming of Judgement Day in current events. Its generally agreed that Israel Arab wars have been wars between Muslims and Jews (which were prophesied), and that moral standards have declined leading to rampant fornication, alcohol consumption, and music listening. "A slave giving birth to her master" can happen when the child of a slave woman and the slave's owner inherits the slave after the owner's death—slavery being practiced in the Islamic State (until its defeat). An embargo of Iraq is alleged to be foretold in the hadith "Iraq would withhold its dirhams and qafiz". That Muslim states are being led by those who do not deserve to lead them, is an article of faith among jihadis and many other Muslims. ISIS alleges that worship of the pre-Islamic deity al-Lat is being practiced by its Shia enemy Hezbollah. The naked shepherds who will build tall buildings is interpreted to refer to builders of skyscrapers in the Gulf State who are "only a generation or two out of desert poverty".

But the Islamic State is also attempting to fulfill prophecies itself to hasten end times. Zarqawi published "communiqués detailing the fulfillment of specific predictions" found in a famous book on jihad and end times called, A Call to a Global Islamic Resistance by Abu Musab al Suri. His successor, Al-Baghdadi, took "the fulfillment of apocalyptic portents even more seriously". According to Hassan Abbas, (Note: "an expert on jihadi movements") at least part of ISIS's motivation in killing and otherwise provoking Shia is to "deliberately ... instigate a war between Sunnis and Shi'a, in the belief that a sectarian war would be a sign that the final times has arrived"; and also explains the ISIS Siege of Kobanî—a town of 45,000 was under siege by ISIS from September 2014 to January 2015. "In the eschatological literature, there is reference to crisis in Syria and massacre of Kurds—this is why Kobane is important."

Thus, "ISIS's obsession with the end of the world" helps explain its lack of interest in the "ordinary moral rules" of the temporal world, according to Jessica Stern. If you are "participating in a cosmic war between good and evil", (and if everyone will be dead and then resurrected relatively soon anyway), pedestrian concerns about saving the lives of the innocent are of little concern.

== Similarities among Abrahamic beliefs ==
Islam is similar to other Abrahamic religions in teaching the bodily resurrection of the dead, the fulfillment of a divine plan for creation, and the immortality of the human soul, that the righteous are rewarded with the pleasures of Heaven and the wicked punished with the torment of Hell.

== Questions and criticism ==
Among the problems critics see with some of the concepts of, and attention given to, the eschatology of Islam, are its effect on the socio-economic health of the Muslim world, the basis of the scripture (particularly the hadith) dealing with end times, and the rational implausibility of some of the theological concepts such as resurrection of the dead.

Mustafa Akyol criticizes the current focus of the Muslim community on apocalypticism and the use of the forces of the Dajjal to explain stagnation in the Muslim world in the past two centuries vis-à-vis the West (and now East Asia). He argues that if supernatural evil is believed to be the cause of the problems of Muslims, then practical solutions such as "science, economic development and liberal democracy" will be ignored in favor of divine intervention. (On the other hand, some point out that a sahih hadith reports Muhammad saying that, "If the Final Hour comes while you have a shoot of a plant in your hands and it is possible to plant it before the Hour comes, you should plant it.")

== See also ==
- Eschatology
- Signs of the coming of Judgement Day
- Imran N. Hosein
- Nafs-e-Zakiyyah (Pure soul)
- Schools of Islamic theology
- Shia eschatology
- Signs of the reappearance of Muhammad al-Mahdi
