= List of Mahdi claimants =

List of Muslims who have claimed to be the Islamic Mahdi

In Islamic eschatology, the Mahdi is a Messianic figure who, it is believed, will appear on Earth before the Day of Judgment, and will rid the world of wrongdoing, injustice and tyranny. People claiming to be the Mahdi have appeared across the Muslim world and throughout history since the birth of Islam.

A claimant Mahdi can wield great temporal, as well as spiritual, power: claimant Mahdis have founded states (e.g. the late 19th-century Mahdist State in Sudan), as well as religions and sects (e.g. Bábism, or the Ahmadiyya movement). The continued relevance of the Mahdi doctrine in the Muslim world was most recently emphasised during the 1979 seizing of the Grand Mosque in Mecca, Saudi Arabia, by up to 600 militants led by Juhayman al-Otaibi, who had declared his brother-in-law, Muhammad bin abd Allah al-Qahtani, the Mahdi.

== Background ==
Traditionally interest in "apocalyptic speculation", (with the appearance of the Mahdi being central), has been strongest among mainstream Twelver Shia, Isma'ili, and Sunni Muslims living on the "doctrinal and geographic margins" – such as present day Morocco or Sudan – but was weaker in the heartland of Sunni Islam.

While at least in Shi'a Islam, waiting for the Mahdi "is hailed as a form of worship; joining him when he appears and fighting under his banner to fill the world with justice is an everyday aspiration of the faithful", so that more pious Muslims are naturally attracted to support for someone convincingly claiming to be a Mahdi, there is sometimes considerable clash between a claimant on the one hand, and orthodox believers and Islamic scholars on the other. In Iraq claimants have been condemned as "infidels, charlatans and liars", while in Iraq one self-proclaimed mahdi, Dia Abdul Zahra Kadim, and Ahmad al-Hassan, who claims the mahdi has appointed him his representative (wassi), both with militias, have both vigorously attacked Ayatollahs of Shi'i Islam.

Mahmoud Pargoo offers the explanation that according to Shīʿa hadiths, the mahdi "will bring a new religion, a new book and a new law"; making hard won Islamic learning and beloved, established religious rituals and institutions "redundant".

== Eighth century ==
=== Abdallah ibn Mu'awiya ===
Abdallah ibn Mu'awiya was a descendant of Ja'far ibn Abi Talib. At the end of 127 AH / AD 744 Shias of Kufa set him up as Imam. He revolted against Yazid III, the Umayyad Caliph, with the support of Shias of Kufa and Ctesiphon. He moved to west of Iran and Isfahan and Istakhr. He managed to control the west of Iran for two years. Finally, he was defeated by the caliph armies in AD 746–7 and fled to Harat in Khurasan. He allegedly died imprisoned by Abu Muslim, his rival. His followers did not believe his death and said that he went to occultation and he would return as Mahdi.

=== Muhammad ibn Isma'il ===
Muhammad ibn Isma'il (740–813 CE), son of Isma'il ibn Ja'far (for whom Isma'ili sect of Islam was named), did not claim to be a Mahdi, and most Isma'ili believe the line of Imams continued through his son Ahmad al-Wafi (Abadullah ibn Muhammad), but after his death was revered by his followers as "the seventh and last imam ... whose return was awaited under the signs and powers customarily ascribed to the Mahdi."

== Tenth century ==
In the tenth century the Isma'ili sect split into two – the Salamiyids, headquartered in Salamiyah and led by Abdullah al-Mahdi Billah; and the Qarmatians, centred in al-Hasa (Eastern Arabia) – each proclaiming a Mahdi. The Qarmatians broke away from the Salamiyah after Abdullah al-Mahdi Billah (Salamiyid leader) proclaiming himself mahdi. About 30 years later, Qarmatian leader Abu Tahir al-Jannabi, proclaimed his own Mahdi, a "young prisoner", Abu'l-Fadl al-Isfahani.

=== Abdullah al-Mahdi Billah ===
In 899 CE, Abdullah al-Mahdi Billah (born Abdullah Sa'id) (r. 909–934), the head of the Isma'ili sect at the time, declared himself to be the Mahdi. The first caliph of the Fatimid state, established in 909, was one of few claimants who succeeded in establishing a state. (See Abū ʿAbd Allāh Muḥammad ibn Tūmart and Muhammad Ahmad bin Abdullah bin Fahal below). His authority as Mahdi was invoked to seize central Syria in 903, but his forces there were crushed by Iraqi troops. His preacher, Abu 'Abdullah Al-Husayn Al-Shi'i, helped secure for him parts of north Africa using the support of the Berber locals some years later. The date of the apocalypse that was to follow the arrival of the Mahdi was "indefinitely postponed", and Abdullah was unable to deploy any of the supernatural powers he (in theory) possessed as Mahdi – those who insisted he use them were dismissed, and sometimes put to death.

The Fatimids eventually "abandoned millenarian rhetoric" completely and devoted themselves to empire building. They built Cairo as capital in Egypt and their descendants continued to rule as Caliphs. The sixth caliph, Al-Hakim bi-Amr Allah, was known for "unpredictable commands" (destruction of churches, nocturnal ceasefires, liquidation of all dogs, prohibition of music) carried out with extreme violence – and occasionally rescinded with equal suddenness. His impulsiveness was believed by some to be divinely inspired and inspired the Druze religion, adherents of whom believe he is in occultation and due to return as Mahdi on Judgment Day.

The dynasty ended when Salah-ud-Din Ayubi (also called Saladin) took over Egypt and ended the Fatimid state. He imprisoned the last Fatimid Caliph and his family in the Fatimid Palace for the rest of their lives.

=== Kadu ibn Mu'arik al-Mawati ===
A young Kutama Berber, al-Mawati was proclaimed as the Mahdi by disillusioned adherents of al-Mahdi Billah, in the aftermath of the purge of Abu Abdallah al-Shi'i and anti-Kutama riots in the cities of Ifriqiya. The Fatimid heir-apparent, al-Qa'im was given command of an army sent against the rebels. On 21 June 912, the Fatimid army decisively defeated the rebels near Mila. The anti-Mahdi al-Mawati and the other rebel leaders were soon captured, and prominently featured in al-Qa'im's triumphal entry into Kairouan in autumn.

=== Abu'l-Fadl al-Isfahani ===
Abu'l-Fadl al-Isfahani, also known as the Isfahani Mahdi, was a young Persian man who in 931 CE was declared to be "God incarnate" by Qarmatian leader of Bahrayn, Abu Tahir al-Jannabi. This new apocalyptic leader, however, caused great disruption by rejecting traditional aspects of Islam, and promoting ties to the old Persian religion of Zoroastrianism; "urging his followers" to denounce Abrahamic prophets and "celebrate fire" as Zoroastrians did. Abu Tahir disavowed him as an "imposter" and had him put to death.

=== Muhammad al-Mahdi Billah ===
In the summer of 945, during the Kharijite revolt of Abu Yazid against the Fatimid Caliphate, a man claiming to be an Abbasid prince rose in revolt against Abu Yazid at Béja. He used a black banner and claimed to be the Mahdi, with the name Muhammad al-Mahi Billah. Very quickly he was arrested by Abu Yazid's son, Ayyub, and interrogated. After he was tested about his knowledge of Baghdad and proved to be unable to respond, he was crucified in front of the city gate.

=== Muhammad ibn al-Mustakfi ===
Muhammad ibn al-Mustakfi was the son and designated heir of the Abbasid caliph al-Mustakfi, he assumed the mantle of the Mahdi in a conspiracy to overthrow the Buyid Emirs and their puppet caliph, al-Muti.

== Twelfth century ==
=== Hassan II of Alamut ===
In the late eleventh century, as the Fatimid dynasty relinquished any supranatural claims or interest in millenarianism, the Isma'ilis suffered another split. The head of the Fatimid army (Al-Afdal), sidelined the son designated heir (Abu Mansur Nizar) of the deceased caliph for a more compliant son-in-law. A revolt led by Nizar was crushed, but in Iran the commander of Isma'ili forces, Hasan-i-Sabbah, broke from the Fatimids in Cairo and commenced a reign of terror against both leaders of the Sunni Abbasids and the Fatimid court in Cairo from his citadel in Alamut.

In the middle of Ramadan in 559 AH (1164 CE), a successor of Hasan-i-Sabbah, Hassan II gathered his followers and announced to "jinn, men and angels" that the Hidden Imam had freed them "from the burden of the rules of Holy Law". With that, the assembled took part in a ritual violation of Sharia, a banquet with wine, in violation of the Ramadan fast, with their backs turned towards Medina. Hassan II explained that he had abrogated the exoteric practice of Sharia and stressed on the esoteric (batini) side of the laws. And "while outwardly he was known as the grandson of Buzurgumid", in his esoteric reality, Hasan claimed "he was the Imam of the Time" (the last Imam of Shia Islam). Observance of Islamic rites was punishable by the utmost severity. Resistance was nonetheless deep, and Hasan was stabbed to death by his own brother-in-law. Islamic law was reintroduced after the death of his son.

=== Ibn Tumart ===
In Sunni Morocco, Muhammad ibn Abdullah ibn Tumart (c. 1078/1080 – c. 1130), sought to reform Almoravid decadence in the early 12th century. Rejected in Marrakech and other cities, he turned to his Masmuda tribe in the Atlas Mountains for support. Because of their emphasis on the unity of God, his followers were known as al-Muwahhidun ('Unitarians', in English; Almohads in the corrupted form). Ibn Tumart rejected all other Islamic legal schools, and saw in the lax morality of the ruling Almorvid dynasty signs of that The Hour of Judgement was nigh.

Although declared mahdi by his followers in 1121 CE, and calling himself imam and masum (literally in Arabic: innocent or free of sin), Ibn Tumart consulted with a council of ten of his oldest disciples, and conform traditional Berber representative government, later added an assembly of fifty tribal leaders. The Almohad rebellion began in 1125 with attacks on Moroccan cities, including Sus and Marrakech.

His failure to capture Marrakech in 1130 "undermined his messianic pretentions to invulnerability", and he died shortly after he designated Abd al-Mu'min his successor with the title of Caliph. Abd al-Mu'min claimed universal leadership in Islam – and placed members of his own family in power, converting the system into a traditional sultanate.

== Fourteenth century ==
=== Musa ===
Öljaitü had executed a Kurdish man named Musa who claimed to be the Mahdi of Shia Muslims.

=== Shia in Iran and Iraq ===
With the Mongol invasion of the eastern Muslim world in the 13th century, many Muslims were killed, and Iran and Iraq came under Mongol control. By the early 14th century Shi'a in Iran and Iraq began "clandestine dissidence". For example, in Hilla, a center of Shi'i learning in central Iraq, each day from afternoon to evening prayer, 100 townsmen participated in a ritual appealing to the Mahdi to reappear. Drums were beaten, trumpets and bugles blown, a saddled horse for the Mahdi led to the sanctuary of the 'Master of the Hour' where the Shiʿa townsmen would cry: 'In the name of Allah, Master of the Hour, in the name of Allah, come, for disorder is rampant and iniquity rife! This is the moment for you to appear! Through you, Allah will make known the true [and separate] from the false!" Similar messianic events occurred in Iran.

Fazlallah al-Astarbadi

After the Mongol Khanate disintegrated after the death of Abu Sa'id Bahadur Khan in 1335, itinerant brotherhoods propagated "popular spirituality", with the "foremost" group, the Shaykhiyya-Juryya, announcing the imminent coming of the Mahdi and calling on Shia to prepare for his arrival by taking up arms. They were subdued by Timur from 1381 to 1392. Messianic agitation was taken up in 1386 by a dream interpreter by the name of Fazlallah al-Astarbadi who proclaimed himself the "manifestation of divine glory" and possessing the attributes of the "Master of the Age", including the ability to discern hidden meanings of letters of the alphabet (hurūfiyya). He was executed in 1394, but his disciples "venerated him as a divine incarnation" and awaited his return under the signs of the "Master of the Sword". This sect was "hounded on all sides for heresy" in Iran and Syria, and gradually assimilated into the Sufi brotherhood of the Bektashis in Anatolia.

== Fifteenth century ==
=== Nurbakhsh ===
A generation after the execution of Fazlallah al-Astarbadi in the early fifteenth century, Ishaq al-Khuttalani, a Sufi master of the Kubrawiyya order in what is now Tajikistan, proclaimed one of his followers, Nurbakhsh (the Gift of Light), the awaited Messiah (i.e. Mahdi). This movement "grew in size and influence", staged an unsuccessful revolt, whereupon Khuttalani and dozens of followers – but not Nurbakhsh – were executed in 1425. Nurbakhsh eventually established his own order in Kurdistan "but was forced to publicly renounce any claims to the imamate."

=== Muhammad ibn Falah ===
Another example of how a "millenarian insurrection " gave rise "to a new dynastic power" is Muhammad ibn Falah (1400–1465/66). He proclaimed himself the wali (friend) of the Mahdi circa 1415 CE. (The first Imam, Ali is regarded by Shiʿa as the wali of Allah.) By 1436 his following had grown in southwestern Iran and he now claimed to "the seventh imam's ultimate incarnation" and delivered "an address of the Mahdi". His sect became known as Musha'sha'iyyah. Opponents of his heresy arose in holy cities of Iraq, but his power was such that he destroyed the cities of Hilla and Najaf, even desecrating Ali's tomb. He also established an emirate in Khurzestan passed on to his descendants, who became provincial governors after the emirate was conquered by the Safavids in 1508.

=== Muhammad Jaunpuri ===
Muhammad Jaunpuri (1443–1505), born in Jaunpur (modern-day Uttar Pradesh, North India), reportedly claimed to be the Mahdi on three occasions: in front of the Kaaba in Masjid al-Haram (901 AH), at the Taj Khan Salaar Mosque, Ahmedabad, Gujarat (903 AH), and in Badli, Gujarat, where he attracted followers but also opposition from the ulema (905 AH). Jaunpuri died in 1505 AD, aged 63, at Farah, Afghanistan. His followers, known as Mahdavis, continue to exist, focused around the city of Hyderabad but also present in other parts of India and around the world.

=== Sheikh Bedreddin ===
Sheikh Bedreddin (Ottoman Turkish: شیخ بدرالدین; 1359–1420) was a theologian and revolutionary best known for his role in a 1416 revolt against the Ottoman Empire, in which he and his disciples posed a serious challenge to the authority of Sultan Mehmed I and the Ottoman state. According to the 15th-century Sunni historian Idris of Bitlis, Bedreddin considered himself the Mahdi, who would bring about God's unity in the world by distributing his lands among his followers.

== Sixteenth century ==
In 1509, the Banū Saʿdid, a family claiming ancestry from Muhammad and aided with the military support of the Shaziliyya, "the most powerful brotherhood in the region", took control of Sous. It leader, born Muhammad al-Mahdi, was proclaimed sovereign, and his followers "saw in him the realisation" of a famous hadith stating that "a descendant of the Prophet, bearing the same name, Muhammad, will come to restore justice on earth." The dynasty of Banū Saʿdid went on with the help of firearms to rule Morocco for most of the following century.

=== Ahmed ibn Abi Mahalli ===
Unsuccessfully challenging the Saʿdid dynasty was another figure making use of Mahdi title, Ahmed ibn Abi Mahalli (Arabic: ابن أبي محلي); n (1559–1613). A Moroccan Imam and the Sufi leader, who proclaimed himself Mahdi in 1610 after denouncing his Sufi master as an innovator and reviling the ruling Sa'did dynasty for alleged religious laxness and failure to attack Western colonialists. He took the city of Marrakesh in the south of Morocco, but after he was killed in combat in 1613 his followers saw "their faith in his invincibility disproven" and fled. His head was severed and hung from the city ramparts until it disintegrated, but despite this graphic evidence "part of the population" in the region refused to accept his death and believed that he "had hidden himself from public view."

=== Shah Ismail I Safavid ===
Nurbakhsh influence was felt in the Safavid dynasty (1501–1736). The dynasty was named after a Sufi order (Safaviyya) that converted to Shiʿism in the fifteenth century, (although the dynasty was "probably of Kurdish origin"). The Safavids depended for military power on "fanatical Turkmen tribes", known as "Qizilbash", who were accused of paganism and shamanism and even ritual cannibalism. After its leader (Haydar) died in combat, he was succeeded by his twelve-year-old son Ismail I.

"Strongly influenced" by one of Nurbakhsh's disciples, Ismail used eschatology to justify the savagery of Qizilbash, claiming he was the Mahdi. The ferocious Qizilbash took successively Baku, Tabriz, Isfahan, Shiraz, Baghdad, but were routed in 1514 by the Ottoman artillery.

"Unable any longer to pose as the Mahdi, he now claimed to be an ambassador of the Hidden Imam. The Anatolian origins of the Safavid family were conveniently forgotten and replaced by a prophetic ancestry that allowed the dynasty to represent itself as the instrument of the twelfth imam during the course of the Great Occultation. A minority of the Qizilbash nonetheless continued to consider the shah to be the Mahdi himself."

This heresy was suppressed by Ismail's son and successor. Today, he is revered by many Azeris, Turkmen and Kurds, especially by the Alevi sect of Islam and in the religious practice of the Shabaks.

== Seventeenth century ==
=== Ahmad al-Mansur ===
Ahmad al-Mansur (1578–1603), sultan of Morocco. The jurist Ahmad bin Muhammad bin al-Siddeeq wrote a treatise exclusively on the Mahdi, presenting a hundred arguments in support of the Mahdism of al-Mansur.

=== Ahmed ibn Abi Mahalli ===
Ahmed ibn Abi Mahalli (1559–1613), from the south of Morocco, was a Qadi and religious scholar who proclaimed himself mahdi and led a revolution (1610–13) against the reigning Saadi dynasty.

== Eighteenth century ==
=== Āghā Muḥammad Rezā ===
Agha Muhammad Reza, a Shia Muslim of Iranian ancestry living in the Sylhet region of Bengal rose to prominence as a Sufi pir. He gained a large following of thousands and started a movement in 1799 by invading the Kachari Kingdom and claiming independence from the British. Declaring himself the Mahdi, he was defeated after a number of battles against the East India Company. He escaped but was later caught and sent for lifetime imprisonment in Calcutta.

== Nineteenth century ==
The 19th century provided several Mahdi claimants, some of whose followers and teachings survive to the present day.

=== Bu Ziyan ===
One Mahdi who did not aim to reinvent Islam but to uphold it against kafir invaders, was Bu Ziyan. In 1849, Muhammad appeared to him in a series of dreams, commanding him "three times" to "assume the duties of the Mahdi" and drive the French colonists from Algeria. Bu Ziyan had served as representative of the Anti-French leader Abd al-Qadir, but now led an uprising with the help of many members of the strongest Sufi brotherhood, Rahmaniyya. The French besieged their headquarters at the oasis of Zaʿatsha for 52 days, breaking through and annihilated the population. Bu Ziyan's head was mounted on a pike at the village entrance, but "word spread through the Sahara that the Mahdi – or at least one of his sons had escaped alive."

=== Alí Muḥammad (Báb) ===
Alí Muḥammad (1819–1850) claimed to be the Mahdi in 1844, taking the name the Báb (the Gate) and founding a religious movement known as Bábism. He taught that a greater Prophet would soon appear ("Him Whom God shall make manifest"). He was executed by firing squad in 1850 in the town of Tabriz. Bábism was violently opposed. The large majority of its followers accepted the claim of Baha'u'llah to be the one whom the Bab had foretold. Thereafter, for the large majority, it continued in the form of the Baháʼí Faith, whose followers consider the Báb as a central figure of their own.They also regard him as the return of Elijah, John the Baptist, the Qa'im, the 'Úshídar Máh from the Jewish, Christian, Islamic and Zoroastrian religions respectively, according to the official history of the first Baha'i century.

=== Muḥammad Aḥmad ===
Muhammad Ahmad bin Abd Allah (1844–1885) was a Sudanese Sufi sheikh of the Samaniyya order. Expelled for puritanical outbursts of anger, he founded his own order amidst Sudanese popular protest and millenarian unrest over Anglo-Egyptian rule. In June 1881 he declared himself Mahdi, announcing he had dreamt that he had been enthroned by Muhammad. He established control over the province of Kordofan and went on to lead a successful military campaign against the Turko-Egyptian government of Sudan, defeating the Anglo-Egyptian army and capturing the Sudanese capital, Khartoum in 1885. He predicted he would soon say prayers in Mecca, Medina, Cairo, and Jerusalem, but died a few months after his victory. The Mahdist State continued under his successor, Abdallahi ibn Muhammad, until 1898, when it fell to the British Army following the Battle of Omdurman.

=== Mīrzā Ghulām Aḥmad ===
Mirza Ghulam Ahmad (1835–1908) claimed to be both the Mahdi and the second coming of Jesus in the late 19th century in British India. In 1880, Ahmad claimed to be the Mahdi in his book Braheen-e-Ahmadiyya, in which he claimed to have received revelations. In 1889, he founded the Ahmadiyya religious movement, which is not recognised as Islam by most mainstream Muslims. In 1974, Pakistan declared that Ahmadis are legally not Muslims. Since Ghulam Ahmad's death, the Ahmadiyya community has been led by his successors.

=== Mouhammadou Limamou Laye ===
Mouhammadou Limamou Laye (1843–1909) was the founder of the Layene Sufi order, based in Senegal. After the death of his mother he declared himself to be the Mahdi on May 24, 1884. This caused controversy with the French and many orthodox Muslims. His message emphasised cleanliness, prayer, alms, and social justice.

== Twentieth century ==
=== Muḥammad bin Abd Allah al-Qahtani ===
Muhammad bin Abd Allah al-Qahtani (1935–1979) was proclaimed Mahdi by his brother-in-law, Juhayman al-Otaibi, who led over 200 militants to seize the Grand Mosque in Mecca on 20 November 1979. The uprising was suppressed after a two-week siege in which at least 300 people were killed.

=== Riaz Aḥmed Gohar Shahi ===
Riaz Ahmed Gohar Shahi (born 1941) is the founder of the spiritual movements Messiah Foundation International (MFI) and Anjuman Serfaroshan-e-Islam. He is controversial for being declared the Mahdi, Messiah, and Kalki Avatar by the MFI. Shahi's supporters claim that his face became prominent on the Moon, Sun, nebula star and the Black Stone in Mecca. Shahi disappeared from public view in 2001. There have been claims that he died in that year or in 2003, but these are unconfirmed.

=== Ariffin Moḥamed ===
Ariffin Mohammed (born 1943), also known as "Ayah Pin", the leader and founder of the banned Sky Kingdom, he was born in 1943 in Beris, Kampung Besar Bachok in Kelantan, Malaysia. In 1975 a spiritual group was formed in Bagan Lebai Tahir, Butterworth, Penang. He claimed to be the incarnation of Jesus, as well as Muhammad, Shiva, and Buddha. Devotees of Sky Kingdom believe that one day, Ayah Pin will return as the Mahdi.

== Twenty-first century ==
=== Dia Abdul Zahra Kadim ===
In 2006, an Iraqi named Dia Abdul Zahra Kadim announced he was the Mahdi and organised an armed group called the Soldiers of Heaven. In late January 2007, Kadim allegedly tried to seize Najaf. He was killed with many of his followers by Iraqi forces in the Battle of Najaf. Unofficially, Iraqi and American forces are accused of wiping out the entire community of the Soldiers of Heaven, including women and children, at a "camp in Zarga, north of Najaf".

=== Other cases ===
According to seminary expert, Mehdi Ghafari, some dozens of Kurdish Sufis who claimed to be the Mahdi were imprisoned in Iran in 2012.

== People claimed to be the Mahdi by their followers or supporters ==
- Al-Hakim bi-Amr Allah, the sixth Fatimid caliph and 16th Ismaili Imam (r. 996–1021). Al-Hakim is an important figure in a number of Shia Ismaili sects, such as the world's 15 million Nizaris and 1–2 million Musta'lis, in addition to 2 million Druze.
- Adnan Oktar, a Turkish Islamic televangelist and cult leader.
- Ja'far al-Sadiq, a hadith transmitter and the last agreed-upon Shia Imam between the Twelvers and Isma'ilis. Claimed to be the Mahdi according to the Tawussite Shia.
- Wallace Fard Muhammad, founded the Nation of Islam, a religious movement, in Detroit, United States on 4 July 1930. The Nation of Islam teaches that W. Fard Muhammad was both the "Messiah" of Christianity and the Mahdi of Islam.
- Muhammad Bayazeed Khan Panni, a Bangladeshi politician, homeopathic medicine practitioner, writer, and social reformer. He was a member of East Pakistan provincial assembly. Claimed by the followers of him to be The Mahdi according to the Hezbut Tawheed.
- Muhammad ibn Abdullah al-Aftah ibn Ja'far al-Sadiq, a figure whose existence is contested: a portion of the Fathite Shia Muslims (followers of Abdullah al-Aftah ibn Ja'far al-Sadiq), believed that Muhammad was the son of Imam Abdullah al-Aftah, whom they believed to be the Imam after his father Ja'far al-Sadiq.
- Muhammad ibn Abdallah an-Nafs az-Zakiyya, a descendant of the Islamic prophet Muhammad, through his daughter Fatimah. Known for his commanding oratory skills, amiable demeanor, and impressive build, he led the Alid Revolt in Medina, a failed rebellion, against the second Abbasid caliph Al-Mansur.
- Muhammad ibn Ali al-Hadi, a descendant of the Islamic prophet Muhammad and the son of Ali al-Hadi and the brother of Hasan al-Askari, the tenth and eleventh Imams in Twelver Shia, respectively.
- Muhammad ibn Qasim (al-Alawi), an Alid who led an unsuccessful Zaydi revolt against the Abbasid Caliphate in Talaqan, in what is now northeastern Afghanistan.
- Musa al-Kazim, a descendant of the Islamic prophet Muhammad and the seventh imam in Twelver Shia Islam. Claimed to be the Mahdi according to the Waqifite Shia.
- Usman dan Fodio, a Fulani scholar, Islamic religious teacher, poet, revolutionary and a philosopher who founded the Sokoto Caliphate and ruled as its first caliph.
- Yahya ibn Umar, In the days of the Abbasid caliph Al-Musta'in, he marched out from Kufa and lead an abortive uprising from Kufa in 864-65 C.E., but was killed by the Abbasid forces led by Husayn ibn Isma'il, who had been sent to deal with him.

== People claiming to be representatives of the Mahdi ==
According to at least Shi'i beliefs, before the hidden imam or the Mahdi himself appears, "a messenger that represents him and serves as an intermediary between him and the people" will appear, conveying his commands and carrying out some of his tasks.

- Haidar al-Munchidawi, an Iraqi man nicknamed al-Qahtani, wears a turban and describes himself as "the mediator of the Mahdi"; his followers opened a Facebook page entitled, "Fully Dedicated Youth".
- Fadel al-Marsoumi, self-described as "the divine preacher", claims to be sent by God to unify all sects in a single group; also has a Facebook page.
- Ahmed al-Hasan, an engineer from Basra and leader of the Shia Iraqi movement Ansar al-Imam al-Mahdi declared in 1999 that the hidden Imam had designated him as his representative (wassi). He has denounced the errancy of religious seminaries in Najaf, and established a militia dubbed the Supporters of the Iman Mahdi (Ansar al-Imam al-Mahdi). Although a native of Iraq, he calls himself (and his followers believe him to be) al-Yamani, the eschatological leader from Yemen who will precede the return of the Imam, although this is not a mainstream belief in Shia Islam. Following the American invasion of Iraq, he called for a defensive jihad against "the American Satan", and threatened all those who resisted him with being put to the sword or dying "in the shadow of the sword". In addition, he has called on Iranian Supreme Leader Ali Khamenei and "all other" Muslim leaders to "yield their power to him", and "excoriated" all leading Shi'a who deny that "the end of Great Occultation is at hand".
- Abdullah Hashem, an Egyptian-American disciple of Ahmed al-Hasan, claimed to be the Qa'im Al Muhammad and founded the Ahmadi Religion of Peace and Light (AROPL) in 2015.

== See also ==
- Messiah
- Messiah complex
- List of Jewish messiah claimants
- List of people claimed to be Jesus
- List of messiah claimants
- List of avatar claimants
- List of Buddha claimants
- Second Coming of Christ
- Unfulfilled Christian religious predictions
- List of founders of religious traditions
- List of people who have been considered deities
- Signs of the reappearance of Muhammad al-Mahdi
- Reappearance of Muhammad al-Mahdi
- Mahdism

== External sources ==
- Filiu, Jean-Pierre (2011). Apocalypse in Islam. Translated by DeBevoise, M. B. Berkeley: University of California Press. ISBN 978-0-520-26431-1.
- Yohanan Friedmann, "Prophecy Continuous – Aspects of Ahmadi Religious Thought and Its Medieval Background"; Oxford University Press (2003) ISBN 965-264-014-X
- Timothy Furnish, "Holiest Wars: Islamic Mahdis, their Jihads and Osama bin Laden" (Greenwood, 2005)
- Peter Smith, the Bábí and Baháʼí Religions – from messianic Shi'ism to a world religion; Cambridge University Press (1987); ISBN 0-521-30128-9
- Abbas Amanat, Resurrection and Renewal – the Making of the Bábí Movement in Iran 1844–1850; Cornell University Press (1989); ISBN 0-8014-2098-9
- Esslemont, J.E. (1980). Bahá'u'lláh and the New Era, An Introduction to the Baháʼí Faith (5th ed.). Wilmette, Illinois: US Baháʼí Publishing Trust. ISBN 0-87743-160-4.
