= Black Banner =

Black Banner may refer to:

- Chernoe Znamia, a Russian anarchist organization
- the Black Standard of Muhammad in Islamic tradition
- Flag of ISIS, used by Salafi jihadist militant group Islamic State
- the Banner of the Mongols, used in wartime
- the Black Banners, or Ahmadi Religion of Peace and Light

== See also ==
- List of black flags
