= 2008 Iraqi Day of Ashura fighting =

- Part of the Iraq War, Iraqi insurgency
Date	January 18–19, 2008
Location	Basra & Nasiriyah, Iraq
Result	Iraqi security forces victory

Belligerents
Iraq	Soldiers of Heaven

Commanders and leaders
(Iraq) Gen. Abdul-Jalil Khalaf (Iraq) Col. Abdel Amir Jabbar †	Ahmed Hassani al-Yemeni; Abu Mustapha Ansari †

Strength
Unknown	200+

Casualties and losses
18 killed 33 wounded	58 killed 166 captured
- 4 civilians killed Unconfirmed reports suggest 147 killed on both sides

The 2008 Iraqi Day of Ashura fighting was a series of clashes that occurred on the Islamic holy day of Ashura on January 18, 2008 and the next day in the Iraqi cities of Basra and Nasiriyah. The battles were fought between the Iraqi security forces and fighters of an Iraqi cult called the Soldiers of Heaven, which a year before fought a similar battle, also on Ashura, near the city of Najaf. Then their leader was reported killed along with his deputy Ahmed Hassani al-Yemeni but this time around it was reported that al-Yemeni was still alive and leading the cultists.

== The battle ==
Cultist fighters started attacking members of the security forces in the two cities on January 18 and heavy fighting ensued. Initially the rebels had the upper hand and even took control of a police station in Nasiriyah and set up a command center in a mosque in the city. Fighting raged late in the evening, and burned out police vehicles were seen on the streets of Basra. Rebels captured an oil facilities building and a hospital in Basra and at one point there was fighting in 75 percent of the city.

The next morning a coalition air strike destroyed the police station which was taken over, and late in the afternoon an Iraqi Army raid on the mosque ended the fighting.

== Aftermath ==
Up to 58 cultist fighters and 18 members of the security forces were killed, along with four civilians. 33 policemen were wounded. Among the casualties of the security forces, 15 were Police and 3 were Army. The Iraqi Police and Army also detained 166 militants.

In fighting in Basra: 5 policemen, 3 soldiers, 40 rebels and 2 civilians were killed. In the fighting in Nasiriyah: 10 policemen, 18 rebels and 2 civilians were killed. Among the dead were Abu Mustapha Ansari, the leader of the Soldiers of Heaven in Basra and four police colonels: Colonel Zamel Khazaal Badr, the head of police intelligence in Nasiriyah, Colonel Abdel Amir Jabbar, the commander of the rapid-intervention force in Ziqar province, Colonel Naji Rustom, head of the emergency police force of Nasiriyah and Lt. Colonel Ali Hashim, commander of the Nasiriyah transport police. 166 cultists were captured in Basra, Nasiriyah and Musayyib. Among the captured rebels were two 14-year-old snipers that were responsible for the deaths of two policemen in Basra.

However some reports only days later suggested that the death toll from the fighting was much higher than firstly reported with at least 50 people killed in Nasiriyah and up to 97 people killed and 217 wounded in Basra.

Once again the fate of Ahmed Hassani al-Yemeni remained unknown.
