= Dia Abdul Zahra Kadim =

Iraqi self-declared messiah

Dia Abdul Zahra Kadim (Arabic: ضياء عبد الزهرة كاظم; c. 1970 – January 29, 2007), also known as al-Ali bin Ali bin Abi Talib (Arabic: العلي بن علي بن أبي طالب), was an Iraqi militant who was the leader of a militant Shia Islamist cult named Soldiers of Heaven based in Iraq. He claimed to be the Hidden Imam and Mahdi.

He claimed to be from Hilla, Iraq. He was detained twice in recent years. He was also known to have connections to the former regime of Saddam Hussein since 1993.

After Saddam Hussein was toppled in the U.S.-led 2003 invasion of Iraq, Abdul-Zahra's group appeared to be a legitimate political movement. Soon Abdul-Zahra, who was in his mid-30s, began telling followers that he was the reincarnation of the Ali ibn Abu Talib, the first Shia Imam as well as the last of the Rightly Guided Caliphs.

He was killed by Iraqi forces in late January 2007 in the "Battle of Najaf", as he and his group Jund al-Samaa marched towards the Shiite holy city of Najaf, reportedly planning to kill the Shiite authorities and Grand Ayatollahs there and "take over their hawzas."

== 2007 Ashura attacks ==
Abdul-Zahra Kadim was accused of planning a massive attack in Najaf during the Day of Ashura holy commemoration. Plans called for members of the Jund al-Samaa to disguise themselves as pilgrims then open fire in the attempt to assassinate as many leading Shia clerics as possible and cause overall disruption of the commemoration. Abdul-Zahra Kadim dispatched a three-man assassination squad to a hotel where senior Shia spiritual leader Grand Ayatollah Ali al-Sistani had his office with plans to attack the office.

== Death ==
Abdul-Zahra Kadim was killed during a fierce gun battle with United States, British, and New Iraqi army forces in Najaf on January 29, 2007. He was found wearing jeans, a coat, and a hat, in addition to being armed with two pistols. He was thirty-seven years old.

The footage appeared to show the body of Dia Abdul Zahra Kadim, wrapped in a blanket. His face, with a neatly trimmed beard, matched a photo in a pamphlet found at the site entitled "Holy Coming", which identified him as the Mahdi.

Apparently, he had been claiming he was the Mahdi, in efforts to hide his real identity and recruit new members to the cult.

== See also ==
- Ahmad al-Hasan al-Yamani
- People claiming to be the Mahdi
