= Kanz al-Ummal =

Sunni literature

- Author: Ali ibn Abd-al-Malik al-Hindi
- Original title: كنز العمال في سنن الأقوال والأفعال
- Language: Arabic
- Subject: Hadith collection
- Genre: Islamic literature
- Publisher: Dār al-Kutub al-‘Ilmīyah (1998 edition)
- Publication date: 15th–16th century
- Publication place: India
- Media type: Print

The Treasures of the Doers of Good Deeds (Arabic: كنز العمال في سنن الأقوال والأفعال, kanz al-ʿummāl fī sunan al-aqwāl wa l-afʿāl), better known simply as Kanz al-Ummal, is a Sunni hadith collection, collected by the Islamic scholar Ali ibn Abd-al-Malik al-Hindi (1472 AD– 1567 AD).

== Description ==
Kanz al-Ummal is an arrangement of Jalaluddin al-Suyuti's work, Jami' al-Kabir. It contains around 46,000 hadith, which are an assortment of varying reliability. It means that the Ahadith found in it may be authentic, weak or fabricated.

== Editions ==
- First published by Dā’irat al-Ma‘ārif Hyderabad Deccan, edited by the scholars of Jamia Nizamia.
- Published by Dār al-Kutub al-‘Ilmīyah, Lebanon, 1998, edited by Mahmud Umar al-Dumyati.

== See also ==
- List of Sunni books
