= Battle of Najaf (2007) =

Iraq War battle

- Part of the Iraq War, Iraqi insurgency, and the Iraqi civil war
Date	28–29 January 2007
Location	Zarqa, Najaf Governorate, Iraq
Result	Iraqi and Coalition victory

Belligerents
Iraq; United States; United Kingdom	Soldiers of Heaven, possibly Iraqi tribesmen

Commanders and leaders
(United States) Michael Garrett (United States) Barry F. Huggins (Iraq) Othman al-Ghanmi	Dia Abdul Zahra Kadim †; Ahmed al-Hasan

Strength
800	1,000

Casualties and losses
(Iraq) 11–25 killed (United States) 2 killed 1 AH-64 shot down	263 killed, 407 captured (actual count by US Forces conducting detainee operations post battle)

The Battle of Najaf took place on 28 January 2007 at Zarqa (also spelled Zarga) near Najaf, Iraq, between Iraqi Security Forces (later assisted by U.S. and UK forces) and fighters, initially thought to be Sunni insurgents but later reported to be members of the Shia Islam cult Soldiers of Heaven, who had joined a gathering of worshippers – or, by other accounts, a conflict, originally between an Iraqi government forces checkpoint and 200 armed pilgrims, which then expanded to include local residents, the Soldiers of Heaven group, and UK and U.S. forces. Reportedly, over 250 cult members and 11-25 members of the Iraqi security forces, and two U.S. soldiers were killed.

== Iraqi official account ==
In the lead-up to the Day of Ashura, which involves large numbers of pilgrims travelling, some to Najaf, for Shiite festivals, the Iraqi officials claimed to have discovered a plot by "a heavily armed cult" to assassinate the Grand Ayatollah Ali al-Sistani and other Shia religious leaders. Alleged plans called for the insurgents to disguise themselves as pilgrims and suddenly open fire, in attempts to assassinate as many leading Shiite clerics as possible and cause overall disruption of the holiday. Violent attacks have occurred in Najaf during previous Ashura festivals (see Ashura massacre).

The initial raid by the Iraqi security forces against suspected insurgent hideout turned into heavy fighting, with the Iraqi Army almost being overwhelmed. The government forces began to retreat but were soon surrounded and pinned down. During the hours-long battle, rebel fighters captured one wounded Iraqi soldier; they treated him at the compound and sent him back to his comrades with a message saying "the imam is coming back." The fighting became so intense that support from U.S. and British attack helicopters and F-16 fighter jets were called in. The airstrikes carried out by Special Forces operators partnered with the Iraqi Army helped break the stalemate, but not before one American AH-64 attack helicopter was shot down, killing two U.S. soldiers. Military Transition Team (MiTT) 0810 partnered with the Iraqi Army was first to respond to the Apache helicopter crash as the Soldiers of Heaven cult was attempting to seize the crash site. Once the crash site was secured by U.S. forces and the enemy disposition was ascertained, further support was requested. The Iraqi Army was still unable to advance, and they called for support from an Iraqi SWAT team in Hillah and U.S. motorised infantry troops. Around 1:00PM, elements of the Charlie Company 2nd Battalion, 3rd Infantry Regiment, part of 3rd Stryker Brigade Combat Team, 2nd Infantry Division were dispatched from near Baghdad.

Some of the gunmen managed to break out toward Karbala. On 1 February, the city of Najaf was cordoned off, and subsequently Iraqi Government and U.S. forces appeared to be involved in heavy fighting, including helicopter gunship support. The opposing forces seem to be militants inside the city limits. This seemingly contradicted initial assessment that the hostile group was effectively destroyed after the battle of 28 January, but independently verified information was not available at the time.

== Controversy ==
Another account of the incident was presented in the newspaper articles by Patrick Cockburn, Dahr Jamail and Ali al-Fadhily. According to their version of events, at around 6:00AM, Hajj Sa'ad Sa'ad Nayif al-Hatemi, chief of the Hawatim Shia tribe, led a group of armed pilgrims from that tribe to a security checkpoint. Security forces killed al-Hatemi, his wife, and his driver. The pilgrims, who had walked alongside the car to the checkpoint, then attacked the security forces in retaliation. A local tribe, the Khaza'il, tried to stop the fighting but were shot at in the crossfire. Iraqi troops at the checkpoint reported al-Qaeda forces were attacking and more security forces arrived in response, surrounding the Hawatim. The Hawatim tried unsuccessfully to stop the fighting at this stage. Firing continued and a U.S. helicopter was shot down. U.S. aircraft bombarded the area until early the next morning. 120 Hawatim and local residents were killed. The group led by Ahmad al-Hassani was based in the local area of the fighting and was drawn into it. They, the Hawatim and the Khaza'il, are opposed to groups that make "the core of the Baghdad government". The presence of Ahmad al-Hassani's group provided justification for a massacre of opponents to important groups in the Iraqi government.

A radical Shiite cleric, Ayatollah Mahmud al-Hasani al-Sarkhi, was reported on 6 February 2007, to be calling for an independent inquiry into what "many in Iraq now regard as a 'massacre' in which scores of women and children were killed." The Speaker of the Iraqi Parliament, Mahmoud al-Mashhadani, accused the government of concealing the truth about the event.

According to an article by Jean-Pierre Filiu, substantial numbers of women and children were killed, as they lived with the fighters in Zarga (not Najaf as reported by the government) and everyone in the camp was killed in the fighting. This contradicts the official tally of casualties as "263 terrorists killed". The LA Times reported, "More than 36 hours after the initial assault, estimates by Iraqi officials on the number of dead fighters varied from 150 to 400."

== Aftermath ==
At least six Iraqi policemen, five Iraqi soldiers, and two American soldiers died as a result of the conflict. Another 15 policemen and 15 soldiers were wounded; among them was Najaf's police chief. Another Iraqi military official put the death toll for Iraqi security forces at 25. U.S. and Iraqi troops killed 400 and captured 406 rebels in the fierce fighting around the city. The majority of the fighters were Iraqi, but Brigadier General Fadhil Barwari stated that the group included 30 Afghans and Saudis and one Sudanese fighter. Shi'ite political sources said the gunmen appeared to be both Sunnis and Shi'ites loyal to a heretical cleric called Ahmed Ismail Katte, and linked to the militant group Ansar al-Sunna. The Iraqi army said it captured some 500 automatic rifles in addition to mortars, at least 40 machine guns, and even some Russian-made Katyusha rockets and anti-aircraft missiles.

Information recovered from dead and captured fighters indicate they belonged to a renegade Shi'ite group which called themselves the Soldiers of Heaven (Jund al-Samaa) and have been described as an apocalyptic religious cult. The cult leader, Ahmed Ismail Katte, who claimed to be the Mahdi, a messiah – in Shia Islam. Iraqi officials said that the militant leader, Ahmed Ismail Katte, was a Sunni from a Sunni stronghold of Zubayr near Basra in the south. He represented himself as Ahmed Hassan al-Yamani (a Shia name) to win over support for his cause. He was identified as a deputy to the cult leader Dia Abdul Zahra Kadim, who was believed to be a former security officer from the old regime. Their actual names and identities were also questioned. Another report (Associated Press) said Maj. Gen. Othman al-Ghanemi, "the Iraqi commander in charge of the Najaf region" claimed cult leader Dia Abdul Zahra Kadim "died in the battle".

The U.S. military has referred to them only as gunmen, not insurgents or terrorists. Dia Abdul-Zahra was killed in the fighting while the whereabouts of Ahmed Hassani al-Yamani were not known.

The Iraqi authorities may also have exaggerated their own military success. The signs are that they underestimated the strength of the Soldiers of Heaven and had to call for urgent American air support. One U.S. adviser to Iraqi security forces cautioned against exaggerated casualty reports from the Iraqi government, saying, "There are rumors everywhere, the whole situation is so bizarre." The adviser also questioned how the Soldiers of Heaven force had grown and remained undetected until this conflict. Iraqi officials say the group's stronghold included tunnels, trenches and blockades. The same location was also reported to include a swimming pool, air conditioned beauty salon, car-bomb making workshop and a car dismantling workshop and was described as a "compound". A neighbor said the residents had a history of "criminal activity, including car theft."

After the battle, Iraqi police rounded up hundreds of sect members and put them on trial. On 2 September 2007, the criminal court passed judgement on 458 accused. Ten leaders of the Soldiers of Heaven were sentenced to death, 54 members were released, and the rest were sentenced to jail terms ranging from 15 years to life, Najaf police chief Brigadier General Abdel Karim Mustapha said.
