= Ahmadi Religion of Peace and Light =

Islam-derived new religious movement

Coordinates: 53.0997°N 2.4693°W

The Ahmadi Religion of Peace and Light

Founder
- Abdullah Hashem Aba Al-Sadiq

Scriptures
- The Goal of the Wise (2022); The Mahdi's Manifesto (2024); The Divine Jurisprudence (2025)

Website
- theahmadireligion.org

The Ahmadi Religion of Peace and Light (AROPL; Arabic: دين السلام والنور الأحمدي; Persian: دىن صلح و نور احمدى), also known as the Ahmadi Religion, is a new religious movement derived from Twelver Shia Islam and founded in 2015. The leader of the religion is Abdullah Hashem Aba Al-Sadiq (Arabic: عبدالله هاشم أبا الصادق), an Egyptian-American who claims to be the Qa'im (i.e. the Mahdi) and to have been appointed by name in the will of the Islamic prophet Muhammad. The Ahmadi Religion espouses a religious, political, and economic ideology known as Ahmadism, whose practitioners are called Ahmadis.

== History ==
Abdullah Hashem was a follower of Ahmed al-Hasan, who claimed to be the prophesied "Yamani" and the first of 12 Mahdis who was appointed in the will of Muhammad.

In 2015, Abdullah Hashem announced that he was the Qa'im Al Muhammad ("Second Mahdi") succeeding Ahmed al-Hasan. He then founded the Ahmadi Religion of Peace and Light.

In the United States, AROPL is registered as a 501(c)(3) public charity in Reno, Nevada. It is also registered as a charity in the United Kingdom, where it is headquartered at Webb House in Crewe.

== Beliefs and doctrines ==
AROPL preaches tolerance and contains features of religious syncretism. Some beliefs and doctrines of Ahmadi Religion of Peace and Light are:

- There are seven covenants, including six historical covenants with Adam, Noah, Abraham, Moses, Jesus, and Muhammad, and the current covenant with Ahmed al-Hasan.
- Belief in the transmigration of the soul or reincarnation, per the text Al-Haft Al-Shareef.
- Ramadan is considered to be identical to December, since the Hijri months are considered identical to the solar Gregorian months.
- The actual Ka'aba is in Petra, Jordan, rather than in Mecca, Saudi Arabia.
- The Friday prayer is not obligatory.
- Alcohol is allowed if consumed in moderation.
- Religious head coverings (such as hijabs) are not mandatory.
- LGBTQ people are tolerated, and are allowed to join the religion.

Several media sources have reported that the movement also embraces conspiracy theories about the Illuminati and extraterrestrials. According to the The Telegraph, Hashem has also declared himself the "true and legitimate pope".

== Regional leaders ==
Regional leaders of the Ahmadi Religion of Peace and Light are known as "bishops". They include Kashfullah Amaluddin Ahl Al-Mahdi, Bishop of Malaysia and Indonesia.

== Persecution in Islamic countries ==
According to Human Rights Without Frontiers, AROPL members have been persecuted in numerous Islamic countries, including Algeria, Egypt, Iran, Iraq, Malaysia, Morocco, and Turkey.

On 24 May 2023, 104 AROPL members seeking asylum at the Turkish border crossing point Kapıkule on the Bulgaria–Turkey border were detained and violently harassed by Turkish authorities.

In July 2023, eight AROPL members in Malaysia were arrested by police at an LGBTQ gathering.

== In the United Kingdom ==
AROPL moved headquarters from Sweden to the United Kingdom in 2021, following an investigation by the Swedish authorities regarding visas.

In March 2026, The Guardian reported that the British Home Office was investigating AROPL Studios, a company linked to AROPL which produced social media and YouTube videos about AROPL, over its use of skilled worker immigration visas. Previously the Swedish migration court had issued 69 deportation orders for AROPL members associated with three AROPL-linked companies. AROPL's lawyers said any suggestion that visas were used improperly was false.

On 29 April 2026, 500 UK police officers were involved in raids at three addresses in Crewe, arresting twelve people on charges of modern slavery, forced marriage, and sexual offences in 2023, following reports from a former member of AROPL in Ireland. As of May 2026 they were free on bail pending further enquiries; the police investigation was code-named Operation Decker. The police operation was stated to be "the outcome of a detailed and robust investigation", and to be arresting members and not investigating the religion itself. In November 2026, following the overturning of reporting restrictions, the Guardian reported that "a very significant number of children" were subject to care proceedings, with more than 40 cases being investigated by the family courts: conditions in the children's dormitories were "observed to be neglectful with dirty bedding", with CCTV cameras present. Concerns were also raised about the children's educational provision, with the majority being home schooled via computers.

== Official scriptures ==
- Hashem, Abdullah (2022). The Goal of the Wise: The Gospel of the Riser of the family of Mohammed Abdullah Hashem Aba Al-Sadiq. The Ahmadi Religion of Peace and Light. ISBN 978-1-7392629-0-7.
- Hashem, Abdullah (2024). The Mahdi's Manifesto. The Ahmadi Religion of Peace and Light.
- Hashem, Abdullah (2025). The Divine Jurisprudence. The Ahmadi Religion of Peace and Light.

== See also ==
- Mahdism
