= Al-Muttaqi al-Hindi =

Muslim scholar

‘Ala al-Din ‘Ali ibn ‘Abd-al-Malik Husam al-Din al-Muttaqi al-Hindi

Personal life
- Born: 1472 CE Burhanpur
- Died: 1567 CE Mecca
- Resting place: Jannat al-Mu'alla cemetery, Mecca
- Notable work: Kanz al-‘Ummāl
- Occupation: Islamic scholar

Religious life
- Religion: Islam
- Denomination: Sunni

‘Ala al-Din ‘Ali ibn ‘Abd-al-Malik Husam al-Din al-Muttaqi al-Hindi (Arabic: علاء الدين علي بن عبدالملك حسام الدبن المتقي الهندي; 1472–1567 CE/888–975 AH) was a Sunni Islamic scholar best known for being author of Kanz al-Ummal.

== Biography ==
Al-Muttaqī was born in 1472 CE (888 AH) in Burhanpur, an Indian town in southern Madhya Pradesh on the banks of the Tapti River. ‘Alī al-Muttaqī writes in his autobiography that when he was eight years old, it occurred to his father to enroll him in the service of Shaykh ‘Abd al-Raḥīm Bajan. The Shaykh instructed him in samā‘ and taught him adhkār [pl. of "dhikr"]. ‘Ali al-Muttaqī soon after earned his living as a scribe. He travelled to different regions of Hindustan and travelled to Multan to meet Ḥisām al-Dīn al-Muttaqī and stayed under his guardianship, where he was instructed in Taṣawwuf (Sufism). ‘Alī al-Muttaqī then travelled to Mecca and stayed in the company of Abu al-Ḥasan al-Bakrī al-Ṣiddīqī, from whom he acquired knowledge of hadith and Taṣawwuf. Ali Muttaqi was the follower of Sheikh Muse. He read his books in Hartmut, Yemen. ‘Alī al-Muttaqī wrote some of his early works in Mecca. He also studied with the hadith scholar Shihāb al-Dīn Aḥmad bin Hajar al-Makkī. ‘Alī al-Muttaqī returned twice to India to Gujarat, which was ruled by Maḥmūd Shāh, who was an admirer of the Shaykh.

== Works ==
Regarding ‘Alī al-Muttaqī, the Ahl-i Hadith scholar Siddiq Hasan Khan of Bhopal says: "I have read and studied the works of Shaykh ‘Alī al-Muttaqī, his works are very beneficial and informative and complete."

‘Alī al-Muttaqī's works include:

1. Kanz al-‘Ummāl, his most famous work. This work has been published.
2. Talkhīṣ al-Bayān, regarding the Mahdi of the last time.
3. Maṭla‘ al-Ghāyah, a summary of Ibn al-Athīr’s "Al-Nihāyah fī Gharīb al-Aḥādīth". A manuscript of this was available in the Berlin Library.
4. Ghāyat al-Kamāl fī Bayān Afḍal al-‘Amaml, a copy of it is in the Dār al-‘Ulūm library of Peshawar, a copy also exists in Institute of Oriental Manuscripts Leningrad.
5. Al-Fuṣūl fī Sharḥ Jami‘ al-Uṣūl, a hand written manuscript by ‘Alī al-Muttaqī is in the collections of Khuda Bakhsh Oriental Public Library
6. Jawāmi‘ Kalim fī al-Mawāḍi‘ wa'l-Ḥikam, manuscripts of this work is available in many Indian collections also in Paris, Berlin, and al-Azhar.
7. Al-Aḥādīth al-Mutawattira, a manuscript is available Raza Library Rampur, India.
8. Al-Rutba al-Fākhira, this deals with "taṣawwuf".
9. Tabyīn al-Ṭarīq, also "taṣawwuf".
10. Al-Ḥukm al-‘Irfānīya, also "taṣawwuf".
11. Al-Burhān al-Jalī fī Ma‘rifat al-Walī.

Other books by ‘Alī al-Muttaqī are mentioned in the introduction of "Kanz al-‘Ummāl". A rare manuscript of this is available in the Chester Beatty Library in Dublin, Ireland.

== Death ==
‘Alī al-Muttaqī died in Mecca (1567 CE/975 AH), where he was buried at the Jannat al-Mu'alla cemetery.

== See also ==
- Islamic scholars
