= Al-Qa'im (disambiguation) =

Al-Qa'im is an Arabic name or honorific.

Al-Qa'im may also refer to the following places:

- Al-Qa'im District, a district of Iraq
  - Al-Qa'im (town)
- Al-Qa'im border crossing, between Syria and Iraq
