= Qa'im Al Muhammad =

Messiah-like figure in Shia Islam

In Shia Islam, Qāʾim Āl Muḥammad (Arabic: قائم آل محمد, lit. 'the one who shall rise of the family of Muhammad') is an epithet for the Mahdi, the eschatological figure in Islam who is widely believed to restore the religion and justice in the end of time. The term was used as early as the eighth century to refer to a future member of the family of the Islamic prophet Muḥammad who would rise against tyranny in the end of time and restore justice. This term was already common by the end of the Umayyad caliphate and largely replaced the term Mahdi in Shia literature. The term was often qualified as al-Qa'im bi 'l-sayf (lit. 'the one who shall rise with the sword') or al-Qa'im bi-amr Allah (lit. 'the one who shall rise by the order of God').

== Twelver Shia ==
Twelver eschatology is dominated by the figure of the twelfth Imam, Muhammad al-Mahdi, the son of the eleventh Imam. The twelfth Imam is also known by the titles al-Mahdi (lit. 'the rightly guided'), al-Qa'im (lit. 'he who will rise'), and Saheb al-Zaman (lit. 'lord of the age'). It is believed that he was born around 868, and has been concealed by God from the humanity after the death of his father in 874, who was possibly poisoned by the Abbasids.

During the Minor Occultation (874–941), it is held that the twelfth Imam remained in contact with his followers through Four Deputies. During the Major Occultation (941-present), his life has been prolonged by divine will until the day he manifests himself again by God's permission to fill the earth with justice. In particular, there is no direct communication during the Major Occultation, though it is popularly held that the twelfth Imam occasionally appears to the pious in person or, more commonly, in dreams and visions. He is also viewed responsible in Twelver belief for the inward spiritual guidance of humankind (whereas his outward role begins with his reappearance).

=== Identification with the Mahdi ===
As early as the Minor Occultation (874–941), or possibly much earlier, Twelver sources identify the twelfth Imam with the messianic figure of Mahdi in Islam, though he is often referred to as al-Qa'im and less frequently as al-Mahdi. Al-Nu'mani, for instance, lived during the Minor Occultation and preferred the title al-Qa'im to al-Mahdi in his writings or joined the two as "al-Qa'im al-Mahdi." There is also a tradition ascribed to Ja'far al-Sadiq (d. 765), the sixth Imam, which explicitly identifies the promised al-Mahdi with al-Qa'im, which might indicate some confusion among the Shia about this.

=== Significance ===
Qa'im is also often contrasted with qa'id (lit. 'sitting'), in reference to those Imams who remained politically quiescent, especially the sixth Imam and his successors. At the same time, some traditions emphasize that every imam is the qa'im of his own age (qa'im ahl zamanihi).

Sachedina notes that the titles al-Qa'im has more of a political emphasis than the eschatological title al-Mahdi. More specifically, the title al-Qa'im signifies the rise of the twelfth Imam against tyranny, though a wahid (lit. 'alone') hadith from Ja'far al-Sadiq connects this title to the rise of al-Qa'im after his death. As a wahid hadith, this report is not viewed as reliable by experts, writes Majlesi, especially because it contradicts the Twelver belief that the earth cannot be void of Imam at any time, as the hujjat Allah (lit. 'proof of God'). Majlesi instead suggests that death is meant figuratively in this hadith, referring to the forgotten memory of al-Qa'im after his long occultation.

=== Alternate use ===
While the title itself is for Messianic use some Shia scholars ascribed it to Imam Sadiq, according to some traditions narrated from his father in al Kafi Imam Baqir said about him : By God this is Qaim āl Muhammad. Some scholars like Ali Khamenei in his book, A 250 Years Old Person said : that this title is about his rising in his time to spread religion by peace and this was similar to the Messianic rising of Imam Mahdi to spread religion by sword for that Imam Sadiq is Qaim āl Muhammad fī zamānihi.

However In Imam Sadiq time many saw him as a Messianic figure in Rijāl al Kashi, Manaqib and al Kafi even some historical sources some of his companions wanted to rise by his name in Kufa and Khurasan even Abu Muslim and Abu Salamah wanted to plege alleigience to him instead of Abbasids however He never claimed to be a Messianic figure and refused political uprising or Caliphate or even Alleigence.

== Isma'ilism ==
One of the titles of the Ismaili Imam is qa'im, conveying that it is the Imam who ushers in the resurrection (qiyama). According to Nasir Khusraw, a senior dignitary of the Fatimid Ismaili Imams, the line of Imams from among Ali's descendants though Husayn will eventually culminate in the arrival of the Lord of the Resurrection (Qa'im al-Qiyama). This individual is believed to be the perfect being and the purpose of creation, and through him the world will come out of darkness and ignorance and "into the light of her Lord" (Quran 39:69). His era, unlike that of the enunciators of divine revelation (natiqs) who came before him, is not one where God prescribes the people to work, rather, his is an era of reward for those "who laboured in fulfilment of (the prophets') command and with knowledge." Preceding the Lord of the Resurrection is his proof (hujjat). The Quranic verse stating that "the night of power (laylat al-qadr) is better than a thousand months" (Quran 97:3) is said to refer to him, whose knowledge is superior to that of a thousand Imams, though their rank, collectively, is one. Nasir Khusraw also recognizes the successors of the Lord of the Resurrection to be his deputies (khulafa').

== People claiming to be the Qa'im ==
- al-Saffah (d. 754), Abbasid Caliph who is known today as Saffah but the truth that al-Saffah title was given to his uncle but his title according to Ibn al-Kathīr and ibn al-Athīr was al-Qaim, he claimed to be al-Qaim who will avenge the death of Imam Ali, Imam Hussein, Zayd ibn Ali ibn al-Hussein and Yahiya ibn Zayd, and according to the 8th-9th century book Akhbar al-Abbas wa Wildihi by unknown author Muhammad ibn Ali ibn Abdallah the father of caliph said about him: this is the lord of Bani Hashem al-Qaim al-Mahdi not the son of Abd Allah al-Mahd ibn al-Hassan.
- Alí Muḥammad (Báb) (1819-1850), claimed to be prophet, Qaim and the physical manifestation of Twelfth Imam in 1844 and went to Mecca to proclaim himself as Mahdi and Qaim and from there promised his devotees of Shia to gather them in Karbala and Najaf in 10th of Muharram, Saturday, 1845 (1261 Islamic Hijri calendar) which means 1000 years after death of Imam Hasan al-Askari and the occultation of Twelfth Imam to begin the holy war but he changed the plan (Bada'), he has fulfilled many prophecies about Qaim then he was imprisoned in Iran after return from Mecca by Qajars and executed in year 1850 but his movement the Babism is still alive today and have two sects Azali and Baháʼí Faith they believe that what happened to him was similar to what happened to Jesus in Adam's Cycle and that Muslims and Shias were similar to Jews and he is al-Qaim al-Mahdi, the true and physical Twelfth Imam.
- Ahmed al-Hasan (21 March 1968), an Iraqi Shia preacher, he claimed to be al-Yamani, descendant of Twelfth Imam and Mahdi then in 2008, 10th of Muharram, Saturday, he proclaimed Zuhur and started a battle in Basara but disappeared and later, the largest sect of Ansar, the White Banners claimed that he appeared from first occultation in 2015 and he is Qa'im not Mahdi (Twelfth Imam) and that he is the savior of mankind, they claimed that he has an official page of Facebook which have 1 million Followers worldwide especially in Iraq.
- Abdullah Hashem (27 July 1983), an Egyptian-American who is a disciple of Ahmed al-Hasan, announced himself as the Qa'im Al Muhammad in 2015 and founded the Ahmadi Religion of Peace and Light (AROPL).

== See also ==
- Al-Yamani (Shiism)
- Muhammad al-Mahdi
- al-Qaim
- Great Disappointment
- Babism
- Occultation (Islam)
- Yahya ibn Umar
- Qiyama (Nizari Isma'ilism)
- al-Saffah
- Abbasid Caliphate

== Sources ==
- Madelung, W. (2022a). "Ḳāʾim Āl Muḥammad". In Bearman, P. (ed.). Encyclopaedia of Islam (Second ed.). Brill Reference Online.
- Madelung, W. (2022b). "Al-Mahdī". In Bearman, P. (ed.). Encyclopaedia of Islam (Second ed.). Brill Reference Online.
- Hussain, Jassim M. (1986). Occultation of the Twelfth Imam: A Historical Background. Routledge Kegan & Paul. ISBN 9780710301581.
- Modarressi, Hossein (1993). Crisis and Consolidation in the Formative Period of Shi'ite Islam: Abū Ja'far Ibn Qiba Al-Rāzī and His Contribution to Imāmite Shī'ite Thought (PDF). Darwin Press. ISBN 9780878500956. Archived from the original (PDF) on 2022-06-16.
- Amini, Ibrahim (1996). Al-Imam Al-Mahdi: The Just Leader of Humanity, translated by Abdulaziz Abdulhussein Sachedina. Islamic Education and Information Center. ISBN 0-9680717-0-8.
- Sachedina, Abdulaziz Abdulhussein (1981). Islamic Messianism: The Idea of Mahdī in Twelver Shīʻism. Suny press. ISBN 978-0873954426.
- Amir-Moezzi, Mohammad Ali (1998). "ESCHATOLOGY iii. Imami Shiʿism". Encyclopaedia Iranica. Vol. VIII/6. pp. 575–581.
- Momen, Moojan (1985). An Introduction to Shi'i Islam. Yale University Press. ISBN 9780300034998.
- Donaldson, Dwight M. (1933). The Shi'ite Religion: A History of Islam in Persia and Iraḳ. AMS Press.
- Daftary, Farhad (2013). A History of Shi'i Islam. I.B. Tauris. ISBN 9780755608669.
- Corbin, Henry (2014). History Of Islamic Philosophy. Translated by Sherrard, Liadain. Routledge. ISBN 9781135198893.
- Amir-Moezzi, Mohammad Ali (2007). "ISLAM IN IRAN vii. THE CONCEPT OF MAHDI IN TWELVER SHIʿISM". Encyclopaedia Iranica. Vol. XIV/2. pp. 136–143.
- Tabatabai, Sayyid Mohammad Hosayn (1975). Shi'ite Islam. Translated by Sayyid Hossein Nasr. State University of New York Press. ISBN 0-87395-390-8.
- Virani, Shafique (2011). "Taqiyya and Identity in a South Asian Community". The Journal of Asian Studies. 70 (1): 99–139. doi:10.1017/S0021911810002974. ISSN 0021-9118. S2CID 143431047.
- Virani, Shafique (2005). "The Days of Creation in the Thought of Nasir Khusraw". Nasir Khusraw: Yesterday, Today, Tomorrow.
