= Ahmed al-Hasan =

Iraqi Shia Yamani-claimant (born 1968)

- احمد الحسن
- Born: Ahmed bin Ismail أحمد بن إسماعيل; 1968 (age 57–58); Basra, Iraq
- Occupation: Religious Leader
- Known for: Claiming to be al-Yamani and the deputy of Muhammad al-Mahdi
- Movement: Ansar of Imam al-Mahdi
- Website: saviorofmankind.com

Ahmed al-Hasan (Arabic: أحمد الحسن, romanized: ʾAḥmad al-Ḥasan) is an Iraqi Shia Muslim religious leader. He has been called the most prominent of figures claiming to be the pre-messianic al-Yamani, in the upheaval following the US invasion of Iraq in 2003. In Twelver Shi'ism Islam, the majority religion of Iraq, al-Yamani is "the deputy of the Mahdi, the Twelfth Imam, and a precursor to his Reappearance" and to End Times.

Ahmed al-Hasan, who was born in Iraq, started his call in 1999 and began a public "religious call" in 2002. He was last seen, photographed, and interviewed in 2007, and is presumed to have gone into hiding following the Battle of Najaf sometime in 2008. An office in Najaf claims to exclusively speak for him through various social media platforms including Facebook and Telegram, which his followers believe to be managed by Ahmed al-Hasan himself.

== Life ==
Ahmed al-Hasan was born in Basra, Iraq. He is the son of Ismael, son of Saleh, son of Hussain, son of Salman, who Ahmed claims to be son of Muhammad al-Mahdi. His uncle, Muhsin ibn Saleh, claims that the family tree traces back to Muhammad al-Mahdi. Along with two tribal Sheikhs among others, Sheikh Idaan Khizaawi Muhammad and Sheikh Shayaa' Ismail, who testify that the family tree traces back to Muhammad al-Mahdi. Twelver scholar Sayyid Muneer al-Khabbaz has said that Muhammad al-Mahdi was married and has an offspring, and that there is a well known tribe which traces its lineage to Imam al-Mahdi, which tribe exists until today.

In an interview given in 2007, Ahmed al-Hasan said that he had received a bachelor's degree in Civil Engineering while living in Basra, Iraq. He also reportedly received seminary education in Najaf in the school of Sayyed Mohammad al-Sadr.

=== Religious call ===
I want freedom and salvation for you, so, for the sake of yourself assist me. I am calling you on behalf of Imam Mahdi. I do not want anything for myself but for him. I do not want my glory but his glory. Whoever does not answer my call, he has not accepted my father's call who has sent me to you. Let me tell you the truth: whoever does not respect the child, he has not respected the father.

— Ahmed al-Hasan

According to one of his sermons, in 1999, Ahmed al-Hasan had been commanded by Muhammad al-Mahdi, the twelfth Imam of Shiites, to enter the Hawza Najaf and make some reformation in it. He criticized the available financial corruption, which caused some minor changes in their financial policies. As for scientific activities, in that interval, he published two books, Wilderness or the Path to Allah and The Calf, which were admired by some of the scholars of Hawza at that time.

He publicly started his call in 2002. In the sermon of Hajj and the sermon of Meeting Story, he states that a group of students in Hawza Najaf, decided to give allegiance to him as the messenger of Muhammad al-Mahdi, after seeing visions, revelations, and miracles. Ahmed al-Hasan is referred to as the "savior of mankind" on his official website.

== Claims ==
Ahmed al-Hasan, in his books like The Ideology of Islam, after discussing the meaning of the religion, elaborates on the method by which the previous prophets and representatives of God introduced themselves and proved their righteousness. He states that the most important element of their method is an identifying text or statement from their previous prophets, and anyone who claims that he is a representative of God, including himself, should come up with an identifying text in which he is mentioned. He also emphasizes a lot on visions and revelations seen by people in confirmation of messengers and representatives of God. He considers it a direct way by which God testifies to them. Many of his followers have reported experiences such as seeing visions and revelations confirming him .

Ahmed al-Hasan claims there are many texts and prophecies, in the scriptures of different religions, mentioning him and his matter. He has brought up texts, narrations, and prophecies from different resources like the Quran, the Gospel, and the Torah, and has addressed why they are referring to him.

=== Purpose ===
Regarding the purposes of his movement, he claimed: "The goal of my message is the goal of the Prophets: Noah, Abraham, Moses, Jesus, and Muhammad, which is to spread the true monotheism with which God is satisfied, and for the earth to be filled with peace and justice after it had been filled with oppression and injustice."

=== Muslims ===
" O Ali, there will be twelve Imams after me, and after them there will be twelve Mahdis. You, O Ali, are the first of the twelve Imams... Then if death approaches him, let him hand it over to his son, Muhammad, the Preserver of the Holy family of Muhammad. These are the twelve Imams. After him there will be twelve Mahdis. So if death approaches him, let him hand it over to his son, the first of the close ones. He has three names, one like mine and my father’s: Abdullah and Ahmed, and the third name is al-Mahdi. He is the first of the believers."

— Muhammad's Will according to Occultation by Al Tousi

The most important text that Ahmed al-Hasan refers to is the Muhammad's will, in which he states after him there will be twenty-four successors, twelve Imams, and twelve Mahdis. Muhammad names the first thirteen of his successors, from the first Imam, Ali ibn Abi Talib, to the first Mahdi, Ahmed, and Ahmed al-Hasan claims he is the Ahmed mentioned in the will of Muhammad. In other words, Ahmed al-Hasan introduced himself as the thirteenth successor of Muhammad and the direct successor of Imam Muhammad al-Mahdi.

Muhammad's will is narrated in one of the oldest and most reliable narration books for Shiites, The Occultation (Arabic: کتاب الغیبه) by Shaykh Tusi. There are many studies about the will of Muhammad and its authenticity, such as The Sacred Will by Ahmed Alhasan and Frequency of Narrating the Will by Nadhem Aloqaili. There exist other narrations in which Muhammad describes his will as a statement after which his nation never goes astray. Ahmed al-Hasan by emphasizing this description, states the first person who brings this will as his identifying text must be the true claimant.

Ahmed al-Hasan has claimed, "I am the Messenger of Imam Mahdi, and I am his vicegerent, and I am the first of the twelve Mahdis from the sons of Imam Mahdi". He claims he is the Yamani, who paves the way for the appearance of Imam Mahdi, after his major occultation. The appearance of Al-Yamani is one of the major signs of the appearance of the Mahdi, the 12th Imam of Shi'a Muslims.

Also concerning the Sunni Muslims, as it is narrated in their narration books, Muhammad named the Mahdi The Vicegerent of God Al-Mahdi, and has urged people to pledge allegiance to him.

Ahmed al-Hasan, in some of his books like The Allegories and The Sacred Will, interprets some verses of the Quran that mention Imam Mahdi, himself, and the twelve Mahdis.

=== Christians ===
"Then if any man shall say unto you, Lo, here is Christ, or there; believe it not. For there shall arise false Christs, and false prophets, and shall shew great signs and wonders; insomuch that, if it were possible, they shall deceive the very elect. Behold, I have told you before. Wherefore if they shall say unto you, Behold, he is in the desert; go not forth: behold, he is in the secret chambers; believe it not. For as the lightning cometh out of the east, and shineth even unto the west; so shall also the coming of the Son of man be. For wheresoever the carcase is, there will the eagles be gathered together."

— Matthew 24:23-28 (KJV)

Ahmed al-Hasan has introduced himself as the messenger of Imam al-Mahdi, Jesus, and Elijah. He has brought forth many verses of the Bible as his identifying text. Among these texts, one can mention the one sitting on the throne and the twenty-four elders mentioned in the Book of John's Revelation. He interprets them as Muhammad and his twenty-four successors, i.e. the twelve Imams and the twelve Mahdis mentioned in Muhammad's will. Also, he has introduced himself as the comforter sent by Jesus mentioned in the Gospel of John, the Son of Man coming from the east and the faithful and sensible slave in the Gospel of Matthew, one like a son of man on the white cloud, and the lamb in the Revelation of John In addition to these verses from the New Testament, Ahmed al-Hassan also presented other verses from the Old Testament as identifying texts, the interpretations of which are available in his books.

=== Jews ===
"'I saw in the night visions, and, behold, one like the Son of man came with the clouds of heaven, and came to the Ancient of days, and they brought him near before him. And there was given him dominion, and glory, and a kingdom, that all people, nations, and languages, should serve him: his dominion is an everlasting dominion, which shall not pass away, and his kingdom that which shall not be destroyed."

— Daniel 7:13-14 (KJV)

There are other verses in the old testament that Jews also believe in, and Ahmed al-Hasan has brought them up as his identifying text. For example, in the book of Isaiah chapter 11, he has interpreted that the shoot will spring from the stem of Jesse as Imam Al-Mahdi, and the branch from his roots as himself. Ahmed al-Hassan has interpreted The Ancient of Days mentioned in the book of Daniel as referring to Imam Al-Mahdi. In the same verse, One like a Son of Man that came up to The Ancient of Days is also interpreted as the messenger of Imam Al-Mahdi, Ahmed al-Hasan himself. Ahmed al-Hasan brings forth The Stone seen in the vision of Nebuchadnezzar, the king of Babylon, in the book of Daniel as another identifying text. There exist other verses interpreted as referring to Ahmed al-Hasan and his matter. Multiple books have been written about the evidence of this call, the connection between these texts, and why they refer to their interpreted characters like Imam Al-Mahdi and Ahmed al-Hasan. Among these works by the followers of Ahmed al-Hasan concerning the Bible, one can mention the books by Adil Alsaeedi, Alas Alsalem, Abdurazaq Aldeeravi, Ali Abdulreza, Sadiq Al-Muhammadi, and Hussain Al-Mansuri.

== Supporters and opponents ==
=== Supporters ===
The adherents of Ahmed al-Hasan collectively identify themselves as Ansar al-Mahdi (lit. supporters of the Mahdi, Arabic: أنصار المهدي), (also Ansar al-Imam al-Mahdī), and are sometimes called Ansars. His followers have described his call as being universal, because his preaching addresses Muslims, Christians, Jews, and all of mankind.

Many of his supporters are in his native land, Iraq. While his prominence has wained since his first burst of publicity, there are reportedly "more than 15 official public offices and representatives in major cities" there. He is believed to have followers in many other countries as well, including Iran, Indonesia, Pakistan, Afghanistan, the United States and Australia. And his websites provide teachings in several languages. In Iran, the Yamani movement is said to have "more than 6,000" converts and to be more popular among clerics than lay people, especially due to clerics being more knowledgeable eschatological hadiths and because of the similarities between Ahmed al-Hasan's characteristics and the descriptions given of the promised al-Yamani in the Shīʿa scriptures. This support has begun to cause friction with the Iranian government. According to the chief of Basra police his followers are mostly intellectuals and educated people, including university professors, seminary graduates and engineers.

Ahmed al-Hasan has an official website and Telegram channels. There are many books devoted to supporting or debunking him.

=== Arrests and fabricated charges ===
Ahmed al-Hasan's supporters said that their cause is humanitarian, not terrorist, and that they have no worldly ambitions. Rather, their cause is reform as Sayeed Ahmed al-Hasan has said: "I did not come to demolish."

The group said that the judicial rulings that took place in Iraq and the charges that were falsely and slanderously imposed on people from the group are considered an infringement on the freedom of belief of a group with a non-utilitarian religious orientation. They raise demands to the relevant Iraqi authorities, whether judicial or governmental, to the governments of major countries, and to humanitarian organizations to intervene, reopen investigations with the detainees, and remove Article 4 terrorism charges against them. It is noted that the fatwas to arrest Sayeed Ahmed Al-Hasan, shed his blood, and target his group were issued by the Iraqi Shia authority, followed by the Iranian Shia authority. In 2008, sentences were passed against 43 individuals within days amidst continuous torture and coercion to confess to fabricated charges: 19 men were sentenced to life imprisonment, and 24 men from our group were sentenced to death.

Additionally, one of Sayed Ahmed Al-Hasan's followers was arrested while performing the Husseini rituals during the Arbaeen pilgrimage procession. He had no prior arrest warrant against him, and the charge was his affiliation with the Yamani group, which is Sayeed Ahmed Al-Hasan's group. This has no connection to terrorism, yet they included it under Article 4 terrorism and sentenced him to ten years in prison. The religious authorities in Iraq have influence over the government authorities, intelligence, and police departments, so it is no surprise that they are fighting Sayeed Ahmed Al-Hasan by pushing their agendas. They continue to incite against Sayeed Ahmed Al-Hasan's group through their channels and media, monitoring their movements, and fabricating charges against them whenever the opportunity arises.

=== Saraya al-Qaem ===
Ahmed al-Hasan founded the Riser Brigades in 2015 which fought together with the Iraqi Army against ISIS. Ahmed al-Hasan has stated that Riser Brigades were founded to fight ISIS and protect the Shia shrines and not against the government or the Sunni brothers. He also asked the members of Saraya al-Qaem to refrain from any armed demonstrations inside the cities unless they coordinate with the security authorities in those cities.

According to a colonel from the police in Dhi Qar Governorate a number of officers and members of the security forces were within the ranks of Ahmed al-Hasan.

=== Declaration of disassociation ===
In April 2023, the Najaf office published a declaration of disassociation, to explicitly reannounce that Ahmed al-Hasan allegedly disassociated from the group The Black Banners led by Abdullah Hashem, and the group The Army of Anger led by Razaq al-Jaberi. The disassociation from Abdullah Hashem was also announced in 2015, and before that, the disassociation from Razaq al-Jaberi and his group took place in 2014. They stated that none of these people have ever met Ahmed al-Hasan. Ahmed al-Hasan reposted this declaration on his Facebook account too.

=== Opponents ===
The Shia clerics that are informed about Ahmed al-Hasan's call have largely condemned him, and issued corresponding fatwas classifying Ahmed al-Hasan as an impostor, a fabricator, a deceiver, an innovator, and a liar. According to Iraqi Basra police, investigations conducted revealed that his ancestry does not go back to the prophet. Shi'a Muslim scholars such as Sheikh Ali al-Korani and Jalal al-Din Ali al-Saghir have expressed their negative views of Ahmed al-Hasan's claims in numerous TV broadcasts. He has been accused by his opponents of plotting to assassinate Grand Ayatollah Ali al-Sistani.

An example of his opposition is a question and answer in the pro-Islamic Republic of Iran, Shi'i website "Al-Islam":
Question: What do scholars say about Ahmed al-Hasan, who "makes a various claims, including being the son, messenger, vicegerent, and executor of the affairs of Imam Mahdi, al-Yamani, an infallible Imam, the first of 12 Mahdis."
Reply: "He is a liar. He has been appointed and financially supported by our enemies to create dispute and cause trouble among the followers of Ahlul Bayt" (i.e. Shia Muslims).

Sheikh Ali al-Korani says about the Yamani: "And from them are those who will not obey him! And the reason is, that the clerics and the Hawzas will find it from the difficult matters to accept what opposes what they have studied about and were used to in their concepts and Sharia rulings."

Ahmed al-Hasan claims that Shia Muslims are being "deceived" by the Marja'. He claims that imitating (following and obeying) a scholar is not obligatory for Muslims, and it is considered Shirk (polytheism) to blindly follow a scholar.

=== Muhammad al-Sadr ===
The Shia scholar Muhammad al-Sadr has said that there is a Messenger from the 12th Imam Muhammad al-Mahdi in 1999 and Ahmed al-Hasan's followers bring it forward as proof. Sayyid al-Sadr has said that "the man with the Iqala is the Messenger of the Imam and this must be kept a secret". Another statement made by al-Sadr which is connected with the first one is when he said 12 days before his martyrdom that "Basra has great advantage over the rest of the nations and that there is a great point in Basra but that they should not speak about it now and it should remain a secret". al-Sadr was also teaching his followers that al-Yamani will not come from Yemen and that this was a common misconception, rather he was tied to Iraq.

Another Shia figure Sheikh Jalal al-Din Ali al-Saghir has said in a lecture that al-Yamani has nothing to do with Yemen but Iraq. al-Saghir has said: "There are those who say that Yamani's emergence has nothing to do with Yemen at all. And his army has nothing to do with Yemen at all. Rather, his army and this is what I say: His army, his personality and the map of his movements is all tied to the awaited Iraqi area."

Ahmed al-Hasan has said: "First, it is necessary to know that Mecca is from Touhama and that Touhama is from Yemen. Sheikh AlMajlesy: He (Prophet (p)) said that because Imaan (faith) started from Mecca which is Touhama from the region of Yemen and so it was called: The Yamani Kaaba. Thus, Muhammed℗ and the Holy Family of the Muhammed℗ are all "Yamanis" (they are from Yemen). Muhammed℗ is "Yamani", Ali ℗ is "Yamani", Imam Al Mahdi ℗ is "Yamani", the twelve Mahdis are "Yamani", and First Mahdi is also "Yamani". The working jurists in the past knew that (May God's mercy be upon them). "Now there hath succeeded them a later generation whom have ruined worship and have followed lusts. But they will meet deception." (Maryam: 59). Also Al-Majlisi (may God's mercy be upon him) in the book of Bihar Al-Anwar, named the speech of the progeny of Muhammed℗ as the "Yamani wisdom." That was also reported by the messenger of God℗, as he named Abd Al-Mutalib℗ the sacred house the Yamani Ka’aba. Concerning the Features defining Al Yamani's character, it was narrated by Al-Imam Al-Baqir℗ "There is no banner better than that of the banner of Yamani, it is the banner of guidance because he calls to your companion, so if the Yamani comes out, selling weapons to people or any Muslim becomes prohibited, and if the Yamani appears, stand up to him, because he’s banner is the banner of faith, and it is prohibited for any Muslim to turn away from him, and whoever turns away from him, then he’s from the people of hell because he calls to the truth and to the right path." In this account there is the following:- First: "and its prohibited for any Muslim to turn away from him, and whoever turns away from him, then he’s from the people of hell"... : and this means that Al Yamani has the role of a Divine vicegerent because no character can be a Hujjah (i.e. proof) upon people to a point that if they turn away from him they will enter hell, even if they pray, fast, unless they are the vicegerents of God on his earth and they are Prophets, messengers, Imams and Mahdis. Second: "because he calls to the truth and to the right path": And the call to the truth and the straight path means that this person never makes a mistake where it will make people enter into falsehood or takes them out of the path of truth. Therefore, this person is an infallible and his infallibility is mentioned in a text. And based on that meaning, this constraint or limitation to his character will be useful for us to determine the character of the Yamani. So if one makes his own assumption to the meaning of this narration "because he calls to the truth and to the right path", is rendering the words of the Imams ℗ useless since there will be no limits or restrictions to the character of the Yamani, and may God forbid people saying such a thing about our holy Imams℗. The result of what was discussed above (in the first and second part) is that Al Yamani is one of the proofs of God on His earth and he is infallible, his infallibility is mentioned in a text. And it has also been proven by many frequently narrated accounts and irrefutable texts that the proofs after the Prophet Muhammed℗ are the 12 Imams℗ and after them, there are 12 Mahdis and that there is no proof from God on this earth who is infallible other than them. And through them is the completion of favors and the perfection of religion and the heavenly messages are sealed. Additionally speaking, the 11 Imams ℗ have all been deceased and there only remains imam al Mahdi℗ and the 12 Mahdis℗. The Yamani calls to imam al Mahdi℗. Therefore, the Yamani must be the First of the Mahdis because the 11 Mahdis after him are from his progeny "They were descendants one after another. God is the Hearer and Knower." (34 Al-Imran) They also come after the period of the appearance of Imam al-Mahdi℗, indeed they arrive during the state of divine justice and what is known and is proven is that the first Mahdi will be during the time of imam al Mahdi and he is the first believer in imam al Mahdi℗ when he first emerges. His aim is to provide the necessities for the emergence of imam al Mahdi as it was narrated in the will of Prophet Muhammed℗. And from the characteristics of the Yamani become limited to the fact that the Yamani is the first Mahdi and he is from the 12 Mahdis..."

=== Battle of Najaf ===
Shortly after the January 2007 Battle of Najaf, conflicting reports and news coverage emerged as to who exactly was involved in the clashes. The Los Angeles Times and RFERL identified the leader of the Soldiers of Heaven group as Dia Abdul Zahra Kadim, who was killed in the clashes. However, The New York Times reported that Iraqi officials at a press conference had named the group that was involved in the clashes as Soldiers of Heaven (Jund al-Samaa’), but offered several names for the group's leader, including Ahmad Ismail and Diyah Abdul Zahraa Khadom. The Times article also reported that Diyah Abdul Zahraa Khadom was the same person as Ahmed al-Hasan al-Yamani, and whose alleged role was deputy of the group, not the leader.

Timothy Furnish of mahdiwatch.org wrote, "Security officials say that Ansar Ahmed [al-Hasan] al-Yamani and the Jund al-Samaa [Soldiers of Heaven] are one and the same, while National Security Minister Shirwan al-Waili denies any relation between the two [groups]."

Sheikh Saadiq al-Hasnawi, who is a teacher in the Scientific Hawza of Honorable Najaf says, "This movement (Soldiers of Heaven), we have never heard about it before, and we used to guess that the leader of it is Sayed Ahmad al-Yamani, and they told me about the book Qathi al-Sama which was spread around in multitudes and by anonymous people, and when I read the content of the book I was shocked in its strange ideas completely, over the method of Ahmad al-Hasan al-Yamani."

Sayyed Hasan bin Muhammad Ali al-Hamami (son of the late Marja Sayed Muhammad Ali Musawi al-Hamami) states that Soldiers of Heaven was led by Dhiyaa' [Abdul-Zahra] Al-Qara'wi, who had rejected the 12 Imams of Shia Islam, had claimed to be the 12th Imam Mahdi himself, and had later died in the battle.

Ahmed al-Hasan himself and representatives of his group Ansar of Imam al-Mahdi have denied any involvement in these clashes, and claim they have no links to the group Soldiers of Heaven.

== Dar al-Zahra ==
The goal of orphan care organizations is to sponsor as many orphans as possible. We hope to take care of hundreds of thousands of orphans in the future and provide for every orphan that makes their way to these organizations...

— Ahmed al-Hasan

Ahmed al-Hasan established an orphanage called Dar al-Zahra to support thousands of orphans in Iraq. Ahmed al-Hasan said in regards to Dar al-Zahra: "Through our continuous interaction with thousands of orphans, a significant portion of whom have been left parentless due to the government's failure in effectively managing the country, we witness the dire circumstances faced by these orphans and impoverished individuals. Many of them struggle to fulfill even their most fundamental of life's necessities…"

== Ahmadi Religion of Peace and Light ==
The Ahmadi Religion of Peace and Light considers al-Hasan to be the prophesied Yamani and the first of twelve Mahdis appointed in the will of the prophet Muhammad. A group known as the "White Banners" or "Office of Najaf" emerged, sharing messages attributed to him that some followers rejected as inauthentic. This led to a division, with Egyptian-American disciple Abdullah Hashem spearheading a "Black Banners" faction based in the United Kingdom that accused the White Banners of fabricating messages under Iraqi government influence. The White Banners proceeded to excommunicate Abdullah Hashem in 2015 and again in 2023. While both groups venerate al-Hasan, they interpret his role differently. The AROPL has the largest international following, while the White Banners remains primarily an Iraqi-based faction.

In 2015, Abdullah Hashem announced that he was the Qāʾim Āl-Muḥammad, succeeding Ahmed al-Hasan. He and his followers linked the death of King Abdullah of Saudi Arabia to a widely circulated Shīa prophecy predicting the emergence of Imam al-Mahdī after the death of a King of Hejaz named "Abdullah". They further interpreted King Fahd's name and eye condition as aligning with these prophetic descriptions. Hashem, who was aged 32 in 2015 and of Egyptian descent, also connected his identity to prophecies about the Mahdi emerging from Egypt. The AROPL believes that the ancient Egyptian religion was originally aligned with Islamic monotheism. Citing Muhammad's "will", which allegedly mentions figures named Ahmed and Abdullah, AROPL asserts this refers to both Ahmed al-Hasan and Abdullah Hashem. The group claims al-Hasan personally identified Hashem as the Qāʾim of the family of Muhammad, meeting three prophesied criteria: being named in the last will, possessing exceptional knowledge, and advocating for God's supremacy over human rule. These same criteria, they argue, validated al-Hasan's role as the prophesied Yamani.

== See also ==
- Abdullah Hashem
- List of Mahdi claimants
