= Abdullah Hashem =

American religious leader (born 1983)

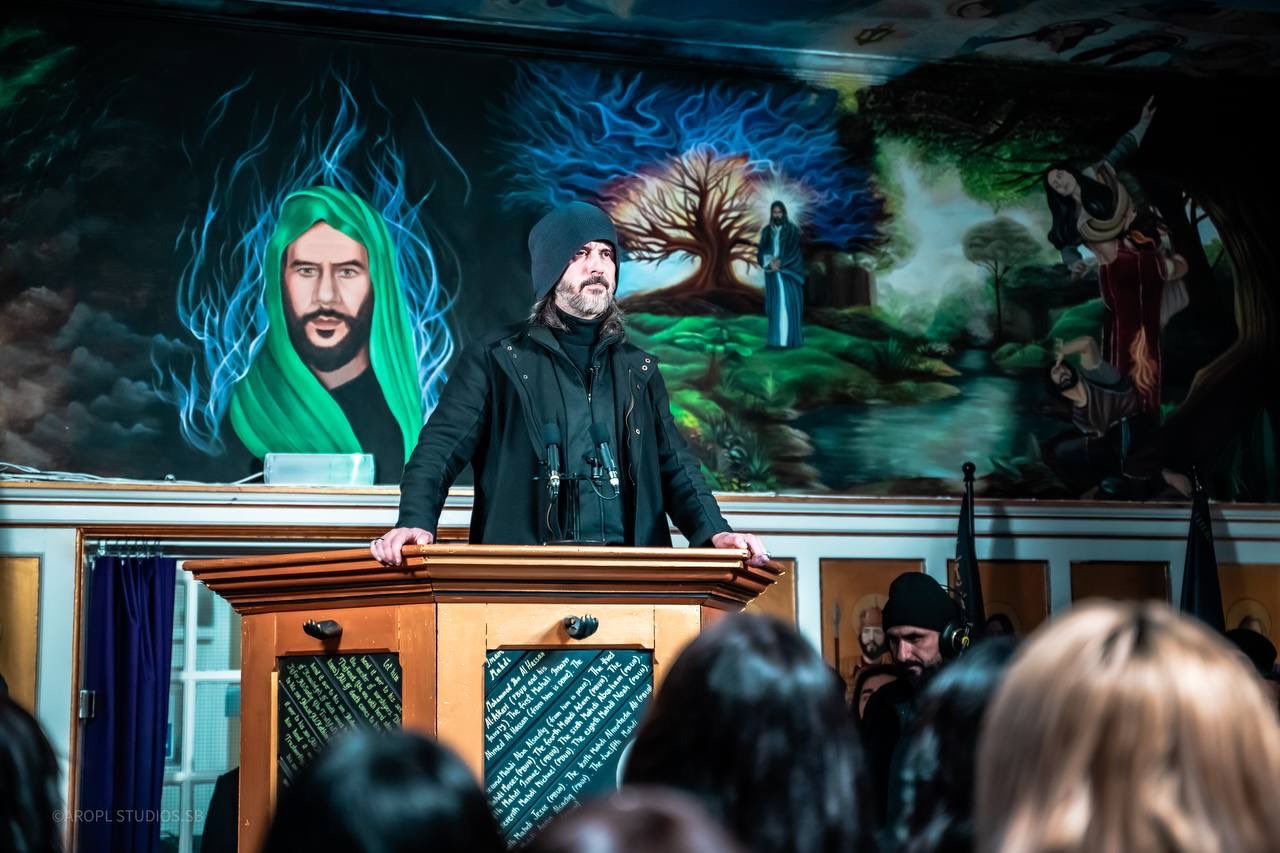
- Born: Abdullah Hashem; 27 July 1983 (age 43); Indiana, United States
- Other name: Abdullah Hashem Aba Al-Sadiq
- Occupation: Islamic new religious movement leader
- Predecessor: Ahmed al-Hasan (claimed)
- Movement: Ahmadi Religion of Peace and Light
- Spouse: Norhan Alquersh
- Children: 4
- Website: theahmadireligion.org www.youtube.com/@themahdihasappeared

Abdullah Hashem Aba al-Sadiq (Arabic: عبدالله هاشم أبا الصادق; born 27 July 1983) is the Egyptian-American founder of the Ahmadi Religion of Peace and Light (AROPL), a millenarian syncretic new religious movement derived from the Twelver branch of Shia Islam.

Adherents of the religion believe him to be the Qa'im of the Family of Muhammad, the Mahdi and the Abdullah who was appointed in the will of the Islamic prophet Muhammad. On his YouTube channel, The Mahdi Has Appeared, he also claims to be the successor of Jesus, Saint Peter, Muhammad, Mahdi, Ahmed al-Hasan and the true and only legitimate pope.

== Early life ==
Abdullah Hashem was born to an Egyptian Muslim father and an American Christian mother. He was raised as a Sunni Muslim.

In 2005, Abdullah Hashem and Joseph McGowen attended and filmed a Raëlian seminar in Las Vegas, claiming that they were making a student film. Then they used the footage as the basis of a documentary, which they presented as an exposé of the group.

== The Arrivals documentary ==
In his earlier years, Abdullah was involved with the internet Islamic conspiracy documentary The Arrivals (2008). The documentary made claims of Illuminati worship, the preparation for the arrival of the Antichrist (Dajjal), and argued that extradimensional jinn were manifesting themselves to humans as extraterrestrial beings in UFOs.

== The Mahdi Has Appeared YouTube channel ==
The Mahdi has Appeared is a YouTube channel created on 14 November 2022. It serves as the official platform of Abdullah Hashem and publishes video content presenting theological teachings, commentaries, and public statements on a range of subjects.

As of the most recent reported figures, the channel hosts 4,968 videos and has accumulated 86.9k subscribers and 33,804,605 total views.

== Personal life ==
Since 2012, Abdullah Hashem has been married to Norhan Alquersh. They have four children: two girls and two boys.

== Controversies ==
Members of Hashem's group, the AROPL, have been arrested for various offences including forced marriage, and sexual assault. The police described the operation as being the result of a "detailed and robust investigation".

== Publications ==
In 2022, Abdullah Hashem published The Goal of the Wise, the official gospel of the religion (Arabic: غاية الحكيم). The book, which has 42 "doors" or chapters, has been translated into Arabic, Urdu, Spanish, French, German, Turkish, Azeri, Persian, and other languages.

On 19 May 2025, The Goal of the Wise was awarded the 2025 Best International Book Award in the category of Religion and Spirituality at the International Book Fair in Turin, Italy.

- Hashem, Abdullah (2022). The Goal of the Wise: The Gospel of the Riser of the family of Mohammed Abdullah Hashem Aba Al-Sadiq. The Ahmadi Religion of Peace and Light. ISBN 978-1-7392629-0-7.
- Hashem, Abdullah (2024). The Mahdi's Manifesto. The Ahmadi Religion of Peace and Light.
- Hashem, Abdullah (2025). The Divine Jurisprudence. The Ahmadi Religion of Peace and Light.
