= Soldiers of Heaven =

Iraqi Shi'a militant group (c.2003 - c.2008)

- جند السماء
- Leaders: Dia Abdul Zahra Kadim †; Ahmed al-Hasan
- Dates active: c.2003 - c.2008
- Ideology: Millenarianism; Apocalypticism
- Size: 1000

The Soldiers of Heaven (Arabic: جند السماء; Jund As-Samāʾ) were an Iraqi Shia religious militant cult known for fighting in the Battle of Najaf in January 2007 against Iraqi, American and British forces. Led by Dia Abdul Zahra Kadim, who was killed in the battle, the Soldiers of Heaven were accused of trying to start a "messianic insurrection" at the holy city of Najaf during the event of Ashura.

Prior to the battle, members of the group were settled with their families at a "camp in Zarga, north of Najaf", where "the main part" of the fighting took place.

The group has been described as an apocalyptic Muslim cult that separated from another group called the "Supporters of the Imam Mahdi" led by Ahmed al-Hasan. The Soldiers of Heaven were said to believe that spreading chaos would hasten the return of the 12th Imam/Mahdi, who will then rule the world, destroying tyranny and falsehood and bringing peace and justice before the Day of Judgement.

While some sources report that the Soldiers of Heaven were annihilated at the Battle of Najaf, others report that a large number were captured and that there was continued activity by the sect.

== Leadership ==
Dia Abdul-Zahra, also known as Abu Kamar, claimed to be the Mahdi, a messiah-like figure in Islam. Iraqi officials have claimed that Ahmed al-Hassan, another leader in the group involved in the fighting against American and Iraqi forces, and was also a participant in the fighting in Najaf, is actually a Sunni pretending to be a Shiite, with an Iraqi general from the Babil Governorate telling the New York Times in an interview, "He is a Wahhabi he is from a Sunni town". Two rival Shiite clerics also made these claims regarding Hassan denying he was a Shiite, however other Shiite clerics have stated Hassan studied at a Shiite seminary in Najaf but later broke off from it. Iraqi MP Jalal al-Din Ali al-Saghir said regarding Hassan "I am 100 percent sure that the group's deputy was a security officer with the old regime."

== Background ==
=== Beliefs ===
According to reports, The Soldiers of Heaven are/were:

- "profoundly" Iraqi nationalist and anti-Iranian;
- hostile to the Shia clerical hierarchy and "particularly to Ayatollah Sistani, (a native of Iran, though he has lived in Najaf since 1952);
- believe their former leader Dia Abdul Zahra Kadim was the Mahdi and he was the reincarnation of Imam Ali ibn Abu Talib;
- believe spreading chaos will hasten the return of the Hidden Imam.

== Membership ==
The members of the group, which numbered around 1,000, appeared to be mostly poor Shi'a farmers from an agricultural area 19 kilometres northeast of Najaf, but they also seemed to have been heavily armed. In spite of their poverty, the group appeared to have amassed a great deal of wealth. Some (including Iraqi officials) have also claimed that the group included former Iraqi personnel affiliated with Saddam Hussein's government and the (formerly) ruling Baath Party. According to Iraqi officials according to the Associated Press, "Sunni extremists and Saddam Hussein loyalists were helping the cult" attempt to attack pilgrims and clerics.

== Activities ==
On January 28, 2007, the group apparently fought a bizarre battle with Iraqi and U.S. forces near Najaf where it is alleged about 200–300 of their members were killed, including its leader, and 300–400 were captured. Asaad Abu Gilel, the governor of Najaf has claimed that members of the group, including women and children, planned to disguise themselves as pilgrims and kill leading Shi'a clerics during the Ashoura holiday.

Significant questions remain regarding the group and the combat effectiveness it displayed, including shooting down an American AH-64 Apache helicopter gunship. Virtually all information about the group and the battle has come from Iraqi officials, who have released incomplete and sometimes contradictory accounts. Iraqi officials, including Najaf deputy governor Abdel Hussein Attan, had claimed that the group had links with al-Qaeda, but given that Sunni jihadists are fiercely anti-Shia, this seemed unlikely.

After the battle, Iraqi police rounded up hundreds of sect members and put them on trial. On September 2, 2007, the criminal court passed judgement on 458 accused. Ten leaders of the Soldiers of Heaven were sentenced to death, 54 members were released, and the rest were sentenced to jail terms ranging from 15 years to life, Najaf police chief Brigadier General Abdel Karim Mustapha said.

On January 18, 2008 the Soldiers of Heaven were involved in fighting in Basra and Nassiriya.

== See also ==
- List of extinct Shia sects
