= List of Shia hadith scholars =

Books of Shia Rijal
Basic principles
- Ikhtiar Marifat al-Rijal (Kashshi)^{*} Fehrist Asma' Musannifi al-Shia (Najashi)^{*} Rijal of Shaykh Tusi (Shaykh Tusi)^{*} Al-Fihrist (Shaykh Tusi)^{*} Rijal (Ibn al-Qazaeri)^{*} Tabaqat ol-Rijal (Barqi)^{*} Mashyakhah of Tahdhib (Shaykh Tusi); Mashyakhah of Faqih (Ibn Babawayh); Rasalah (Abu Qaleb Zorari)

Secondary principles
- Rijal (Ibn Davoud)^{*} Khulasat al-Aqwal (Allamah Al-Hilli)^{*} Fehrest Sheikh Montakhab ol-Din (Sheikh Montakhab ol-Din); Ma'alem ol-Olama (Ibn Shahr Ashub)

Comprehensives in Rijal
- Majma ol-Rijal (Enayatollah Qohpayi); Rijale Kabir (Estarabadi); Naqd ol-Rijal (Tafreshi); Jame ol-Rowat (Ardabili); Tanqih al-Maqal (Mamaqani); Qamus al-Rijal (book) (Mohammad-Taqi Shoushtari); Tabaghat Aa'lam Al-Shia (Agha Bozorg Tehrani); Moe'jamo Rijal el-Hadith (Abu al-Qasim al-Khoei)

Shia hadith scholars (Persian: رجال حدیث شیعه) are people who have quoted hadith from Shia Imams directly or indirectly through intermediary, and their biographies are found in the books of scholars of rijal (Biographical evaluation) science, such as Ikhtiar Marifat al-Rijal, Fehrist Asma' Musannifi al-Shia, Ae'yan ol-Shia, Moe'jamo Rijal el-Hadith and Az-Zaree'a books. The basis for categorization in this list is the time of death of each person.

== 1st century AH narrators ==
1st century AH (622 CE – 719 CE):

- Abu Rafe'
- Sulaym ibn Qays
- Ali ibn Abi Rafe'
- Kumayl ibn Ziyad
- Rabi'at ibn Sami'e

== 2nd century AH narrators ==
2nd century AH (719 CE – 816 CE):

- Abu Hamza al-Thumali
- Ja'far ibn Muhammad ibn Sharih Hazrami
- Omar ibn Udhayna
- Aban ibn Abi Ayyash
- Asem ibn Homayd el-Hannat
- Zayd ol-Zarad
- Zayd ol-Narsi

=== Fourth stratum: Companions of Muhammad al-Baqir and Ja'far al-Sadiq ===
Muhammad al-Baqir was the fifth Imam in Shia Islam, Ja'far al-Sadiq was the 6th Imam and founder of the Ja'fari school of jurisprudence according to Twelver and Isma'ili Shi'ites.

- Zurarah ibn A'yun (trustworthy and from the Consensus companions)
- Muhammad bin Muslim (trustworthy and from the Consensus companions)
- Burayd ibn Mu'awiya al-'Ijli (trustworthy and from the Consensus companions)
- Abu Basir Laith ibn Bakhtari Moradi (trustworthy and from the Consensus companions)
- Fozayl ibn Yassar (trustworthy and from the Consensus companions)
- Marouf ibn Kharrabouz (trustworthy and from the Consensus companions)
- Aban ibn Taghlib
- Ziad ibn Isa ibn Obaideh al-Haza'
- Bokayr ibn A'yan
- Homarn ibn A'yan
- Mohammad ibn Qayse Bajli
- Ismail ibn Abdorrahman Jo'fi
- Abu Basir Asadi
- Jabir ibn Yazid al-Ju'fi
- Soleiman ibn Khaled Aqta'

== 3rd century AH narrators ==
3rd century AH (816 CE – 913 CE):

- Ahmad ibn Abi Nasr Bazanti
- Al-Fadl ibn Shadhan
- Sa'd ibn Abdullah Ash'ari

== 4th century AH narrators ==
4th century AH (913 CE – 1009 CE):

- Abu Muhammad al-Hasan ibn Musa al-Nawbakhti
- Muhammad ibn Jarir al-Tabari
- Muhammad ibn Ya'qub al-Kulayni
- Muhammad Ibn Ibrahim Ibn Jafar al-Numani
- Abu Ja'far Muhammad ibn 'Ali ibn Babawayh al-Qummi

== See also ==
- The science of rijal
- Timeline of Islamic history
- List of expeditions of Muhammad
- Quranic timeline
- Zakaria ibn Idris Ash'ari Qomi
