= Abdullah ibn Muskan =

Abū Muḥammad ʿAbdullāh ibn Muskān (Arabic: ابومحمد عبدالله بن مُسكان; died before 183 AH/799 CE), commonly known as Ibn Muskān, was an early Twelver Shīʿī hadith transmitter and jurist from Kufa. He is recognized in Imami biographical literature as a reliable narrator and is counted among the consensus companions, whose narrations are accepted without further scrutiny.

== Name, kunya, and tribal affiliation ==
His full name is ʿAbd Allāh ibn Muskān, with the kunya Abū Muḥammad. Classical Imami sources describe him as a Mawla(client) of the tribe of ʿAnaza; according to another report, he belonged to the clients of the tribe of ʿIjl. He resided in Kufa, a major center of early Shīʿī hadith transmission.

== Life and historical context ==
Very little is known about Ibn Muskān's biography beyond his scholarly profile. The secure points are that he was a companion and narrator from Musa al-Kazim (d. 183/799) and that he died during the Imam’s imamate, i.e., before 183 AH (799 CE).

== Relationship with Ja'far al-Sadiq ==
There is a well‑recorded disagreement among Imami rijal scholars over whether Ibn Muskān was also a direct companion of Ja'far al-Sadiq.

Those who include him among al-Sadiq's companions: Ibn Faḍḍāl, al‑Barqī, and al‑Ṭūsī list him among the companions of Ja'far al-Sadiq, and many hadith collections contain numerous narrations transmitted by Ibn Muskān from al-Sadiq, some explicitly stated as direct. Those who restrict him to al-Kazim's circle: al-Najashi does not consider his narration from al-Sadiq as firmly established and counts him primarily among the narrators of al-Kazim. Al-Ayyashi, quoting Yūnus ibn ʿAbd al-Raḥmān (a companion of al-Kazim), reports that although Ibn Muskān transmitted many sayings of al-Sadiq, he directly heard only a single hadith from him.

This divergence is typical in early Shīʿī rijal, where "companionship" can denote direct attendance, authorized transmission through intermediaries, or both.

== Reliability and status in Imami rijal ==
Ibn Muskān is unanimously authenticated by Imami biographers and is classed among the consensus companions. Al‑Najjāshī describes him as thiqa (trustworthy) and ʿayn (a leading authority). Al-Shaykh al-Mufid includes him among the foremost jurists of the early Shīʿa, and later scholars such as Muḥaddith Qummī reiterate his high standing. His name appears in the chains of transmission (Isnad) of well over 1,250 narrations in major Twelver hadith collections.

== Masters ==
Ibn Muskān transmitted from numerous early Kufan Shīʿī authorities, including Abu Basir al-Moradi, Zurarah ibn A'yan, Jabir ibn Yazid al-Ju'fi, Burayd ibn Mu'awiya al-'Ijli, Hishām ibn Sālim al-Jawālīqī, Aban ibn Taghlib, Muhammad bin Muslim, ʿAbd Allāh ibn Abī Yaʿfūr, and Muḥammad ibn ʿAlī al-Ḥalabī.

== Students ==
Many prominent transmitters relied on Ibn Muskān, among them are Safwan ibn Yahya, Yūnus ibn ʿAbd al-Raḥmān, Muḥammad ibn Sinān, Ḥammād ibn ʿĪsā, Ḥammād ibn ʿUthmān, Ayyub ibn Nuh, Jamil ibn Darraj, Ḥasan ibn ʿAlī ibn Faḍḍāl, Hasan bin Mahbub al-Sarrad and Ibn Abī ʿUmayr.

== Works ==
Al‑Najjāshī attributes two works to Ibn Muskān; Kitāb fī l-Imāma (Book on the Imamate) and Kitāb fī l-Ḥalāl wa l-Ḥarām (Book on the Permissible and the Forbidden). He notes that much of the latter work was drawn from the narrations of Ibn Muskān's teacher, Muḥammad ibn ʿAlī al-Ḥalabī. These titles indicate his engagement with both doctrinal and legal topics, consistent with his status as an early Imami jurist.

== Death ==
According to al‑Najjāshī, Ibn Muskān died during the imamate of Musa al-Kazim, hence before 183 AH (799 CE).

== Legacy ==
Ibn Muskān remains a central figure in early Twelver hadith transmission due to his inclusion among the aṣḥāb al-ijmāʿ( consensus companions), the large number of hadiths transmitted through him, and his role as a Kufan link between the generation of Zurarah, Abu Basir, and Muhammad ibn Muslim and the next generation of transmitters such as Safwan and Yūnus.
