= List of Islamic jurists =

Notable faqīh include:

== Sunni jurists ==
- Abu Hanifa
- Malik ibn Anas
- Muhammad ibn Idris ash-Shafi'i
- Ahmad ibn Hanbal
- Sufyan al-Thawri
- Al-Awza'i
- Al-Hasan al-Basri
- Al-Layth ibn Sa'd
- Muhammad al-Bukhari
- Muslim ibn al-Hajjaj
- Abu Yusuf
- Al-Qadi Abu Ya'la
- Muhammad al-Shaybani
- Al-Hasan ibn 'Ali al-Barbahari
- Sahnun
- Abdul-Qadir Gilani
- Dawud al-Zahiri
- Ibn Qudamah al-Maqdisi
- Abul-Faraj Ibn Al-Jawzi
- Izz al-Din ibn 'Abd al-Salam
- Ibn Hazm
- Al-Ghazali
- Ibn Khaldun
- Sidi Boushaki
- Ibn Rushd
- Al-Nawawi
- Ibn Taymiyyah
- Ibn al-Qayyim
- Abu Bakr ibn al-Arabi
- Ibn Hajar al-Asqalani
- Ibn Hajar al-Haytami
- Al-Suyuti
- Al-Qurtubi
- Azizul Haque (scholar)
- Al-Bahūtī
- Al-Marghinani
- Ibn Abidin
- Rashid Ahmad Gangohi
- Mahmood Hasan Gangohi
- Taqi Usmani
- Ibn al-Nafis
- Ibrahim ibn Faïd
- Muzammil H. Siddiqi
- Abd al-Aziz ibn Baz
- Muhammad ibn al Uthaymeen
- Sidi Abd al-Rahman al-Tha'alibi
- Taha Jabir Alalwani
- Mufti Ghulam Rasool Jamaati
- Taqiuddin al-Nabhani
- Ahmed Raza Khan
- Yusuf Al-Qaradawi
- Mahmood Ahmed Ghazi
- Khaled Abou El Fadl

== Shia jurists ==
- Jafar al-Sadiq
- Muhammad al-Baqir
- Abu Basir al-Moradi
- Burayd ibn Mu'awiya al-'Ijli
- Muhammad bin Muslim
- Abu Basir al-Asadi
- Safwan ibn Yahya
- Zayd ibn Ali
- Ibn Shahr Ashub
- Mohammad Mohammad Sadeq al-Sadr
- Ali Khamenei
- Grand Ayatollah Ali al-Sistani
- Ruhollah Khomeini

== See also ==
- Fiqh
- Ulama
