= Fudayl bin Yasar =

Shia Muslim jurist and disciple of Shia Imams

Al-Fuḍayl b. Yasār

Personal life
- Born: 2nd century AH
- Region: Kufa

Religious life
- Religion: Islam
- Denomination: Shia
- Jurisprudence: Ja'fari

Muslim leader
- Teacher: Muhammad al-Baqir, Ja'far al-Sadiq

Fudayl bin Yasar (Arabic: الفضيل بن يسار) was a companion of Muhammad al-Baqir and Ja'far al-Sadiq, and is counted among the so-called consensus companions, a group of narrators whose reliability is widely accepted in early Shi‘i tradition. Biographers and scholars of biographical evaluation have described him as a jurist, a Quranic exegete, and a trustworthy transmitter of hadith. He passed away during the lifetime of al-Sadiq, who is reported to have said of him: "He is one of us, the People of Ahlul-Bayt."

== Life ==
Fudayl bin Yasar was born in Kufa during the late second half of the first century AH (c. late 600s to early 700s CE). He spent his childhood and youth in that city. Later, he moved to Basra, where he resided for the remainder of his life; hence he came to be known as "al-Basri". Because his eldest son was named Qasim, his most common patronymic (kunya) is Abu al-Qasim. Some sources, however, also refer to him as Abu Maswar.

Fudayl's scholarly focus was primarily oriented toward jurisprudence (fiqh), and one of the titles attributed to him is "the Shiite jurist" (al-faqīh al-shīʿī).

His exact place of death is not known, though it is likely that he passed away in the city of Basra.

== See also ==
- Consensus companions
