= Al-Najashi =

Najāshi or al-Najāshī (Arabic: النجاشي) may refer to:

- Najashi, also known as Armah or Aṣḥamah, ruler of the Kingdom of Aksum from 614 to 631
- Ahmad ibn Ali al-Najashi (c. 982–1058), Twelver Shi'ite scholar known for his work on the biographical evaluation of hadith transmitters, the Rijāl al-Najāshī
