= Abu Basir al-Moradi =

Shia Muslim jurist and disciple of Shia Imams (8th century)

Abū Baṣīr al-Murādī

Personal life
- Born: 2nd century AH
- Region: Kufa

Religious life
- Religion: Islam
- Denomination: Shia
- Jurisprudence: Ja'fari

Muslim leader
- Teacher: Muhammad al-Baqir, Ja'far al-Sadiq

Abū Baṣīr Layth ibn al-Bakhtarī al-Murādī (Arabic:ابوبصیر لیث بن البختری المرادی) known as Abu Basir al-Moradi or simply Abu Basir was a Shia Muslim jurist (faqīh), muhaddith and a disciple of the fifth Shia Imam Muhammad al-Baqir (712–732) and his son and successor Ja'far al-Sadiq (732–765). Al-Sadiq is reported to have told Moradi, Zurarah, Burayd, and Muhammad ibn Muslim that they were the "tent pegs of the world", and that the prophetic hadiths would have been lost without them

He was one of the Shia Muslim leaders in Kufa. In religious sources, he is considered as one of the companions of al-Baqir and al-Sadiq, though there is no definitive example of a hadith narration by Abu Basir from al-Baqir. He has also narrated from other hadith narrators of Ahlul Bayt such as Abdul Kareem bin Utbah al-Hashimi (a companion of Ja'far al-Sadiq and Musa al-Kadhim).

== Names ==
Abu Basir's main nickname according to Ibn Ghada'iri and Kashshi was "Abu Muhammad", and according to Ibn al-Nadim and Shaykh Tusi, "Abu Yahya". In the hadith series of Al-Mahasin al-Barqi, Laith Moradi's narration from Abu Basir (maybe Asadi) can be seen, and considering the fact that Najashi called Laith Moradi "Abu Basir Asghar"(lit. Younger Abu Basir), it is not unlikely that he was younger than Abu Basir Asadi. In Shia religious and hadith sources, other figures are also mentioned who are called "Abu Basir": Abu Basir Abdullah ibn Muhammad Asadi Kufi, one of the companions of al-Baqir; Abu Basir Yusuf ibn Harith one of the Batri companions of al-Baqir and Abu Basir Thaghafi.

== His stance towards Fathites and his relationship with al-Kazem ==
There is no clear report about his stance towards Fathites. Agarqoofi's narrative indicates that Abu Basir Moradi did not believe in the Imamate of Musa al-Kazim and the words of Ibn Ghada'iri, a scholar of the 12th century, indicate that his religion was not direct. Regarding his relationship with al-Kazem, although Shaykh Tusi has listed him among the companions of al-Kazim in his Al-Fihrist and al-Rijal, but this point has not been confirmed in the words of Barqi, Kashshi and Najashi. His narration from al-Kazem has not been proven in the Asanid hadiths either. According to Pakatchi, if we put the mentioned scattered evidences next to the laudatory narratives of Fathites about Abu Basir Moradi, it will help to draw conclusions about Abu Basir Moradi's religious orientation. For instance, a story quoted by Fatahi scholar, Ali bin Asbat, in which the name of Abu Basir Moradi is mentioned among several companions of al-Baqir and al-Sadiq, and the influence of Fatahi's point of view can be felt in the selection of characters. In another narration through Ali ibn Asbat, Abu Basir Moradi is considered one of the four people who were the adornment and honor of the Ahl al-Bayt in life and death. In another narration, through Ali ibn Asbat and Ali ibn Hadid Fatahi, Abu Basir Moradi is considered one of the four people who are the guardians of the land and proclaim the religion. From the point of view of non-Fathi sources, Kashshi has narrated two other narrations in which Abu Basir Moradi is considered one of the four "Mukhbatin" heralds of heaven, as well as one of the revivers of hadith from the people of hadith and the trustees of God's halal and haram. Kashshi also mentioned that some people have included Abu Basir Moradi instead of Abu Basir Asadi in the number of six companions of al-Baqir and al-Sadiq. Among other scholars of the Imamiyyah, Ibn Ghada'iri, while considering abu-Basir's religion to be taunted, it has been mentioned that his narrative credibility is not taunted, and Najashi is silent in his description of his condition, his religious orientation and his Rijali reputation.

== Works and students ==
The only work mentioned by Abu Basir Moradi is a book on jurisprudence. This book was more famous for the narration of Ibn Faddal Fatahi on the authority of Abu Jamila Mufadl ibn Saleh. This book has been used to a limited extent by Hadith scholars such as Barqi in al-Mahasin, Kulayni in Kitab al-Kafi, Ibn Babawayh in Man La Yahduruhu al-Faqih, Tusi in Tahdhib, and Al-Istibsar. One of the most important students of Abu Basir Moradi, who has narrated many traditions from him, is Abu Jamila Mufadl ibn Saleh Asadi, and in the next level, we can mention Abd Allah ibn Muskan, Abd Allah ibn Bukayr and Abdul Karim ibn Amr Khatami.

== Bibliography ==
In recent centuries, several works have been written about the Rijali character of Abu Basir, which are: 1. Abi Basir's translation ( or ‘’Risālat ʿadīmat al-naẓīr fī aḥwāl Abī Baṣīr’’ (Arabic: رِسالة عَدیمَة النَظیر فی أحوال أبي بَصیر) which is an essay concerning Abu Basir, distinguishing him from some unreliable transmitters of hadiths with the same name.), by Muhammad Mehdi Khansari (d. 1246 AH), which was lithographed together with Al-Juma'a al-Fiqhiyyah in 1276 AH. 2. A treatise on the investigation of Abu Basir's condition and his distinction from the reliable transmitter of hadiths who had this nickname.), by Mohammad Baqir Shafti (d. 1260 AH), which was published together with a collection of his Rijali treatises in 1314 AH; 3. The translation of Abi Basir, by Mohammad Hashim Khansari (d. 1318 AH), 4. Translated by Abi Basir and Ishaq bin Ammar, from Abu Tarab Khansari (1346 AH); 5. Al-Resaleh Al-Mobsareh Fi Ahval Abi-Basir, by Mohammad-Taqi Shoushtari, published as an appendix to entry 11 of the author's dictionary of al-Rajal; 6. Asanid Abi Basir, by Mousa Shubairi Zanjani.

== See also ==
- Consensus companions
