= Hasan bin Mahbub al-Sarrad =

- الحسن بن محبوب السرّاد
- Born: 129/746-7 or 149/766-7; Kufa, Iraq
- Died: 224/838-9
- Title: Sarrad; Zarrad

Hasan bin Mahbub al-Sarrad (Arabic: الحسن بن محبوب السرّاد, romanized: Al-Ḥasan b. Maḥbub al-Sarrād; (d. 224 AH / 838–39 CE) was a Sahabi (Companion) and transmitter of hadith associated with three Twelver Shia Imams: Musa al-Kazim, Ali al-Rida, and Muhammad al-Jawad. Biographical sources describe him as a reliable companion and a careful narrator. His transmissions, preserved in major hadith collections, reflect a measured and precise approach to recording religious traditions. Though details of his personal life are limited, his recurring presence in early compilations indicates that he was regarded as a trusted figure within the scholarly circles of his time. His works include Kitab al-Taqsir, Kitab al-Nikah, and Kitab al-Hudud wa al-Diyat, among others.

== See also ==
- Consensus companions
