= Consensus companions =

The consensus companions or "As'hab al-Ijma'" (Arabic: اصحاب الاجماع) are eighteen Muhaddith and Islamic scholars who had direct contact with Shia Imams and had great knowledge of religion. Shia scholars accept unquestioningly every hadith which was narrated by them.

== List of consensus companions ==
=== Companions of Imam Baqir and Imam Sadiq ===
- Zurarah ibn A'yan (زُرارة بن أعین)
- Maruf ibn Kharrabuz (معروف بن خَرَّبوذ)
- Burayd ibn Mu'awiya al-'Ijli (بُرَید بن معاویۀ عجلی)
- Abu Basir al-Asadi or Abu Basir al-Moradi (ابوبصیر اسدی (یا ابو‌بصیر مرادی))
- Fuzayl ibn Yasar (فضیل بن یسار)
- Muhammad ibn Muslim (محمد بن مسلم طایی)

=== Companions of Imam Kazim ===
- Jamil ibn Darraj (جمیل بن درّاج)
- Abdullah ibn Muskan (عبدالله بن مُسکان)
- Abdullah ibn Bukir (عبدالله بن بُکیر)
- Hammad ibn Eesa (حمّاد بن عیسی)
- Hammad ibn Uthman (حمّاد بن عثمان)
- Aban ibn Uthman (أبان بن عثمان)

=== Companions of Imam Riza and Imam Jawad ===
- Yunus ibn Abdurrahman (یونس بن عبدالرحمن)
- Safwan ibn Yahya (صفوان بن یحیی سابری)
- Muhammad ibn Abi Amir (محمد بن أبی‌عمیر)
- Abdullah Muqayrah (عبدالله مُغیرة)
- Hasan ibn Mahbub (حسن بن محبوب)
- Ahmad ibn Abi Nasr Bazanti (أحمد بن محمد بن ابی‌نصر بزنطی)

== See also ==
- Ijma
- Usuli
