= Muhammad ibn Munkadir =

Muhammad ibn Munkadir (died 747), the son of an Arab father and an umm walad also known as Ibn al-Munkadir or Muhammad al-Taymi, was a prominent tabi'i (plural: taba'een) and reciter of the Qur'an, who transmitted a number of hadith. His masters were Jâbir Ibn Abd Allah, Anas Ibn Malik, Orwa Ibn az-Zubair, etc. He had for pupils the imâm Malik, Shôba, ath-Thauri, Ibn Oyaina, Ibn Juraij, etc.
