= Burayd ibn Mu'awiya al-'Ijli =

Shia Muslim scholar and disciple of Shia Imams (8th century)

- بريد بن معاوية العجلي

Personal life
- Died: before 148 AH (765 CE)
- Region: Iraq and Medina
- Main interest(s): Ḥadīth, Fiqh

Religious life
- Religion: Islam
- Denomination: Shia
- Jurisprudence: Ja'fari

Muslim leader
- Disciple of: Muhammad al-Baqir, Ja'far al-Sadiq

Burayd ibn Muʿāwiya al-ʿIjlī (Arabic: بُرَیدِ بْن‌ معاویة العجلي) (before 148 AH / 765 AD) was a Shia Muslim jurist and a famous disciple of Shia Imams Muhammad al-Baqir (712–732) and later Ja'far al-Sadiq (732–765). His name is included in the companions of Consensus and was praised by both Imams.

== Life ==
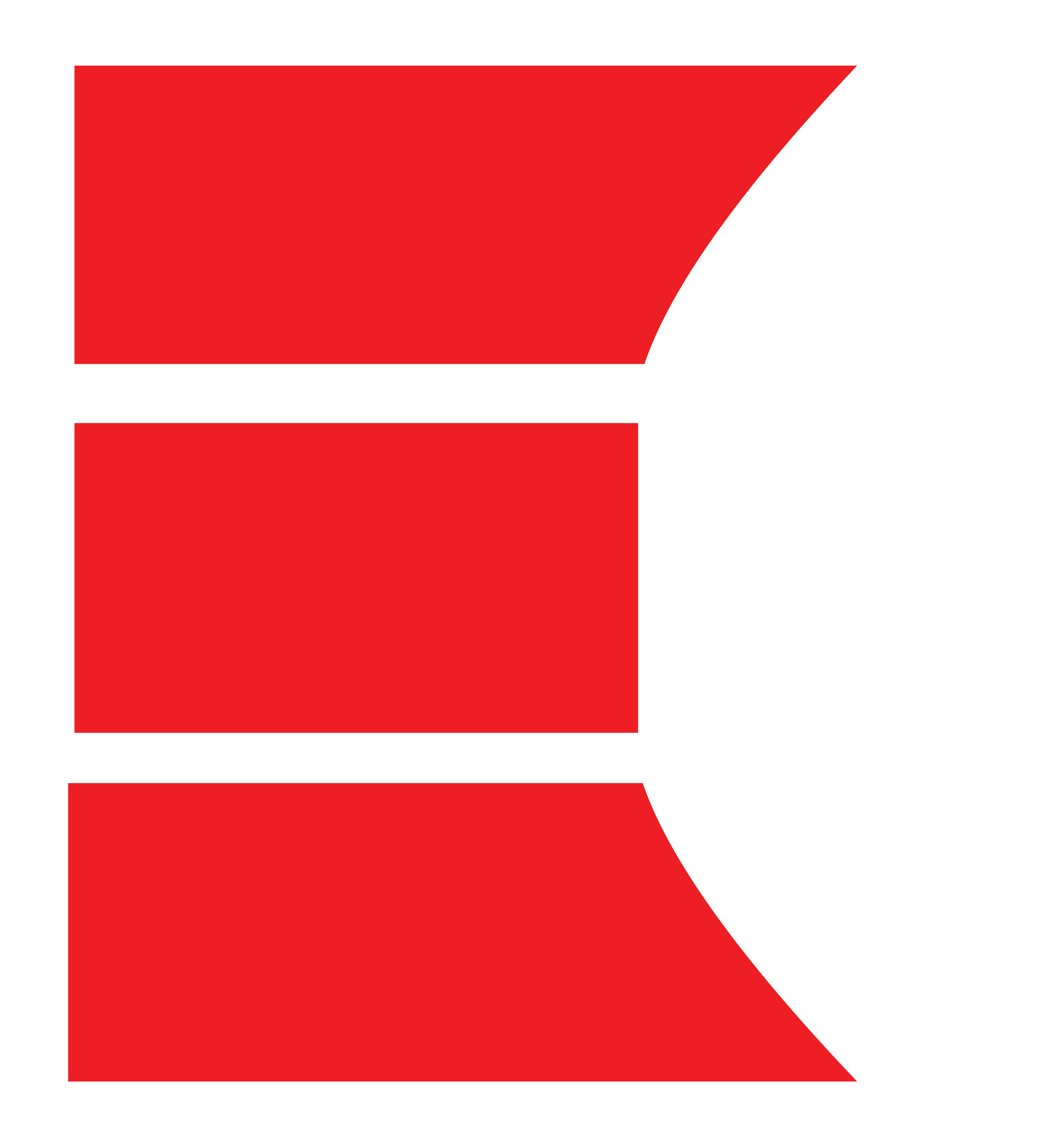
Banner of Banu 'Ijl, the tribe of Burayd

Burayd's father, Mu'awiya ibn Abi Hakim Hatim, was from a family of the Arab tribe of Banu Ijl who immigrated to Kufa following the Muslim conquest (633–651). Burayd began his studies in Kufa, and learned hadith from multiple scholars including Abu Ishaq Ismail ibn Raja al-Zubaydi. In the beginning of the 2nd century after Hijra, Burayd apparently had a trip or trips to Medina, and there he took advantage of Muhammad al-Baqir's study group and was considered one of his special companions. After the passing of Muhammad al-Baqir he followed his son Ja'far al-Sadiq for some time in Medina, and also became one of his special companions. Among the children of Burayd, Kassem and Musa were narrators and authors of Twelver Shi'ism.

Burayd reportedly died in 150 AH (767-68 CE) according to the narration of Ali Ibn Faddal, but Najashi considered his death during the lifetime of al-Sadiq (before 148 AH/765 CE) to be more correct.

== Position ==
He became a key authority in the Shia jurisprudence (fiqh) and one of the Companions of al-Baqir and al-Sadiq, and therefore, his name is included in the Consensus companions. Al-Baqir praised him (along with Abu Basir Moradi, Muhammad bin Muslim, and Zurarah ibn A'yun) as worthy of the paradise. Also al-Sadiq lauded him (along with the other three mentioned above) for upholding and promoting the Imami Madhhab, Al-Sadiq also said that the prophetic hadiths would have been lost without them.

== Contributions ==
Many narrators have learned from Burayd, among them famous names such as Hariz ibn 'Abd Allah al-Sijistani, Aban ibn Uthman, Hammad ibn Uthman, Yahya Halabi, Durust ibn Abi Mansur, Tha'laba ibn Maymun, Jamil ibn Saleh, Hisham ibn Salim al-Jawaliqi, Yunus ibn Abd al-Rahman, Safwan ibn Yahya Muhammad ibn Abi Umayr are seen. Among the Sunnis, Ahmad bin Hamad Hamadani also narrated from him. Najashi has mentioned that there was a book by Burayd, narrated by Ali bin Uqbah Asadi, of which Ibn al-Ghadāʾirī (ابن الغضائري) had seen a copy (p. 112); However, this book has not been known in most of the Imami circles. Dozens of hadiths quoted by Burayd have been recorded in Imamiyyah narrative sources, including The Four Books.
