= Zurarah ibn A'yan =

Shia Muslim scholar and disciple of Imams al-Baqir, al-Sadiq and al-Kazim

Zurārah ibn Aʿyan زُرارة بن أعيَن

Personal life
- Born: 689-90
- Died: 768
- Era: Islamic golden age
- Region: Kufa
- Main interest(s): Ḥadīth, Tafsir

Religious life
- Religion: Islam
- Denomination: Shia
- Sect: Twelver

Muslim leader
- Teacher: Muhammad al-Baqir, Ja'far al-Sadiq, Musa al-Kazim
- Students: Musa bin Bakr al-Wasiti, Aban ibn Taghlib, Jamil bin Darraj, Hisham bin Salem al-Jawāliqi

ʿAbd Rabbih ibn Aʿyan ash-Shaybāni al-Kūfī (about 690-768 AD) (Arabic: زُرارة بن أعيَن الشّيباني الكوفي) was a Shia Muslim muhaddith, theologian and a famous companion of Shia Imams Muhammad al-Baqir (712–732), Ja'far al-Sadiq (732–765), and Musa al-Kadhim (765–799).

Zurarah was reportedly a Muhaddith and Islamic scholar with great knowledge in religion, and was also one of the companions known as the companions of consensus whose hadith are given extra credence by Shia scholars. Muḥaddith Qummī in his book Tuḥfat al-Aḥbāb said that "his excellence and status are too great to mention here". It is believed that Zurarah first argued the theory that the knowledge of God is an obligation on every believer and cannot be attained without an Imam designated by God, and thus complete obedience to the Imam is a religious duty.

== Life ==
Zurarah was likely born around 80 AH (690 CE). Some reports say that Zurarah's real name was ʿAbd Rabbih (Arabic: عبد ربه), and Zurārah was a nickname. He was also known as Abū al-Ḥasan (lit. “the father of al-Ḥasan”). He was from "Al Ain", a famous and influential family in Kufa, which became affiliated to the Banu Shayban tribe through the mawali treaty, as non-Muslims often did after converting. Some reports that his father was a Byzantine monk who was captured and sold into slavery in a Muslim territory to someone from the Shaybānī clan, which Zurārah remained affixed to. Reports of his physical appearance describe him as stout and 'light skinned', with the effect of prostration visible on his forehead.

Zurārah was initially a disciple of al-Ḥakam bin ʿUtayba, a tabi'i from Kufa who narrated from some of the sahaba such as Zayd ibn Arqam, before joining Imam Muhammad al-Baqir. As a prominent traditionist and theologian, Zurārah played an important role in developing the Shia thought. Zurārah lived long enough to also become a close disciple of Jaʿfar al-Sadiq.

== Contributions ==
Zurārah's intellectual activities in the field of scholastic theology greatly strengthened the cause of Jaʿfar al-Sadiq and later that of Musa al-Kazim. Together with other theological and scholastic problems, Zurārah and his disciples evolved the theory that the knowledge of God is an obligation on every believer and cannot be attained without an Imam designated by God, and thus complete obedience to the Imam is a religious duty. The Imams by necessity are endowed with special knowledge. Therefore, what other men can attain by discursive reason (nadhar), an Imam always knows owing to his special knowledge and his superior and unequalled power of reasoning. ↵Zurārah and his circle promulgated their views on almost every question of what we now call scholastic philosophy, such as the attributes of God, His Essence and His Actions, His Intention or Will, and the human capacity. The impression we get of Zurārah from the sources, especially from Kashi, is that he played a very important role in the development of legitimist Shiʿi thought and contributed a great deal to the formation of the Imamiyya creed. He is one of the most frequently quoted authorities in all the major books of the Shiʿis.

== His students ==
Among Zurārah's pupils, who were all devoted followers of Jaʿfar, were his own sons Ḥasan, Ḥusayn, and ʿUbaydullāh; his brother Ḥumrān, the grammarian and one of the foremost companions of Al-Baqir. Ḥamza, the son of Ḥumrān; Bukayr ibn Aʿyan and his son ʿAbdullāh; Muḥammad ibn al-Ḥakam; Muḥammad ibn an-Nuʿmān al-Aḥwal, and Hishām ibn Sālim al-Jawālīqī.

== Authenticity of Zurarah ==
The fifth Shia Imam Muhammad al-Baqir praised him–along with Abū Baṣīr al-Murādī, Muḥammad ibn Muslim, and Burayd ibn Muʿāwiya al-ʿIjlī–as "worthy of paradise". Imam Ja'far al-Sadiq also lauded him, along with the other three, for upholding and promoting the madhhab (Imamiyyah), and asserted that the prophetic ahadith would have been lost without them. However, some reports in al-Kafi relate Jafar Al-Sadiq telling his followers to avoid Zurarah as a liar. Some of the narrations that were mentioned in his condemnation of Zurarah, as stated by Imam Sadiq, were stated in the position of taqiyyah and to protect Zurarah from the government. Some of his jurisprudential thoughts and methods have been criticized. Mirdamad, by confirming Zurarah and believing his belief to be true, has condemned him in the sources because of his mistake in understanding issues such as qadha, qadr, ability, and tolerance in understanding the position of Sadiq. In a narration from Sadiq addressed to Hamza bin Hamran, Zarara's nephew, it is also emphasized that Sadiq was acquitted by what others have narrated about Zarara, not by Zarara himself.

More than 2,000 hadith are attributed him. He is described in Shia biographical literature as “respected” and trustworthy”. It was narrated that: “Were it not for Zurārah, the sayings of my father would vanish soon”.

== Death ==
He died between 766 and 777 AD/149-150 AH in Kufa, Iraq.

== Furthrr reading ==
- Jafri, S.H.M (1979). Origins and Early Development of Shia Islam. London: Longman.
- Lalani, Arzina R. (2004). Early Shi'i Thought: The Teachings of Imam Muhammad Al-Baqir. I. B. Tauris. ISBN 978-1850435921.
- Kohlberg, Etan (2020). Ehteshami, Amin (ed.). In Praise of the Few. Studies in Shiʿi Thought and History. Brill. ISBN 978-90-04-40697-1.
