= Abu Basir al-Asadi =

Shia Muslim scholar and disciple of Muhammad al-Baqir and Ja'far al-Sadiq

Abū Baṣīr al-Asadī أبو بصیر الأسدي

Personal life
- Born: Kufa
- Died: 150 Hijri; 767-8 AD

Religious life
- Religion: Islam
- Denomination: Shia
- Jurisprudence: Ja'fari

Muslim leader
- Teacher: Muhammad al-Baqir, Ja'far al-Sadiq

Yaḥyā b. Abī l-Qāsim al-Asadī (Arabic: یحیی بن أبي القاسم الأسدي) (d. 150 AH / 767-8 AD), known as Abū Baṣīr al-Asadī (أبو بصیر الأسدي) or simply Abu Basir was a Shia Muslim figure in Kufa and a companion of Shia Imams Muhammad al-Baqir (712–732) and Ja'far al-Sadiq (732–765). He may have been a companion of Musa al-Kazim (765–799) as well. Abu Basir's name is included in the six companions of consensus by al-Baqir and al-Sadiq such that hadiths narrated by any one of them is considered authentic by many Shi'a scholars. Some consider Abu Basir al-Moradi as one of those six people instead of Abu Basir al-Asadi.

A large number of religious and jurisprudential traditions in Imamiyyah hadith books, which were narrated from al-Sadiq through Abu Basir, show the extent of their association.Shaykh Tusi listed him among the companions of Musa al-Kadhim too. In addition to narrating from imams, Abu Basir al-Asadi has conveyed Hadiths narrated from some Imami narrators such as Abu Hamza al-Thumali and Saleh (Imran) ibn Maytham.

== Names and lineage ==
His name is recorded as Ishaq, and his nickname was Abu Muhammad. He was called Abu Basir (literally, father of the sighted), maybe because he was blind. Qasim or Abu al-Qasim was his father's nickname. He was called Asadi as he was born in the Bani Asad Arab tribe. He is considered from the people of Kufa in the Rijāl by Shaykh Tusi.

== Miraculous treatment ==
In the early Shi'i writings, Abu Basir is portrayed as having gotten special treatment from Muhammad al-Baqir. Al-Baqir is said to have used his mystical powers during abu-Basir's visit to al-Baqir to give abu-Basir the ability to see the world for the first time.

In a different narrative, Abu Basir asks al-Baqir if the Prophet inherited the knowledge of all earlier prophets and if the Imams have inherited the Prophet's knowledge. when al-Baqir responds positively to both questions, Abu Basir wants to know if the Imams can make the blind see, make the dead rise from the dead, and make the leper recover. The Imam asserts that they can. "He then tells Abū Baṣīr to approach and strokes his eyes and face; Abū Baṣīr sees the sun, the sky, the earth and his immediate surroundings. The Imam offers him a choice: he can remain as he now is (i.e., sighted), though if he does, then on the Day of Resurrection he will have to face the final judgement; or he can return to the state of blindness and be assured of Paradise (laka l-janna khāliṣan/ khāliṣatan). Abū Baṣīr opts for the second alternative; the Imam strokes his eyes and he becomes blind again."

== His position towards deviant Shia sects ==
Abu Basir al-Asadi was considered one of the poles of the intellectual leadership of the Imami community of Kufa, there are several traditions that show that Abu Basir (apparently Asadi) was present in the scenes of intellectual struggle with opposing groups such as Mokhtariyah and Zaidiyyah. In 148 A.H., following the death of Ja'far al-Sadiq, his eldest son, known as Abdullah, claimed to be Imam, and his followers, who were called Fathites, were against a group of Shias who followed Imamate of Imam Musa al-Kazim. The occurrence of this crisis coincided with the last years of Abu Basir al-Asadi's life. Abu Basir's stance against Fathites made him a good figure among the followers of al-Kazim. As in their narrations, Abu Basir is counted among a group of companions of Ja'far al-Sadiq who turned their backs on Abdullah from the beginning and turned to Musa al-Kazim. In various sources, information has been narrated through Ali bin Abi Hamza, which states that Abu Basir (Asadi) shortly after the death of al-Sadiq, while Abdullah al-Aftah was still alive, went to Hijaz to perform Hajj and met al-Kazim and has declared his loyalty to the Imam. In the narrations narrated by the followers of al-Kazim from Abu Basir, he attacked the ideological foundations of Fathites about Imamate. Ali ibn Abi Hamzah and his son Hasan, who also followed the Waqifi religion, have used the traditions of Abu Basir in their works much more than other companions of the imams. In addition, in the sources of Waqefis, some narrations have been narrated from Abu Basir (Asadi) to prove the beliefs of the Waqifi religion. Some have identified Abu Basir Yahya ibn Abi al-Qasim al-Asadi to be the same as Yahya ibn Qasim Hazza Waqifi, and based on this, they have ruled that Abu Basir Asadi was a Waqifi. considering his death in 150 AH and the beginning of the division of Waqifi in 183 AH, his being a Waqifi is ruled out.

== Works ==
Abu Basir apparently narrated a hadith known as Hadith of Lowh in which the belief in twelve imams is discussed in relative detail. In addition to the scattered narrations in Imamiyyah hadith books, what are mentioned as the works of Abu Basir al-Asadi are the following two titles: the book Manasik al-hajj (the rituals of hajj) narrated by Ali ibn Abi Hamzah and Husayn ibn 'Alaa and the book al-Yawm wa l-qibla (the day and Qibla), according to the narration of Ali ibn Abi Hamzah. Ibn Babawayh also used a collection of his jurisprudential narrations narrated by Ali ibn Abi Hamzah in the book Man La Yahduruhu al-Faqih. Also, a collection of about 20 hadiths concerning the underlying grounds of the laws of Sharia narrated by Husayn ibn Yazid al-Nufali from Ali ibn Abi Hamzah has been used sporadically in the Ilal al-shara'i(lit. reasons of the rulings)) of Ibn Babawayh. In addition, Ibn Babawayh has narrated a compilation of the narrations of Abu Basir and Muhammad bin Muslim from the book Hadith al-Arba'ami'a in his Al-Khisal. In addition to what was mentioned, there was a writing by Abu Basir about the conditions of the first imams according to the narration of Muhammad ibn Sinan cited in some old works of Imamiyya and others.

== See also ==
- Consensus companions
