= Al-Dibaj =

Al-Dibaj (Arabic for 'the silk' or 'the brocade') may refer to the following individuals:

- Muhammad ibn Abdallah al-Dibaj, 8th-century Arab nobleman
- Muhammad al-Dibaj ibn Ja'far, 9th-century Alid rebel
