= Jamil ibn Darraj =

Jamil ibn Darraj was one of the Shia scholars and a reliable narrator and a companion of Ja'far al-Sadiq, Musa al-Kazim, and Ali al-Ridha. The date of birth is about 128 AH. His nickname was Abu Ali or Abu Muhammad.

== Family ==
His family lived in Kufa. His father, Abu al-Sabih, was a grocer. His younger brother, Nuh ibn Darraj, was a trustworthy narrator and a judge of Kufa and one time the eastern part of Baghdad.

== Position ==
Jamil ibn Darraj was one of the most reliable Shia narrators in hadith who is among the eighteen Faqīh that Imamiyyah are unanimous on the authenticity of their narrations.

Kashshi has listed the names of these eighteen in three groups of six; 1) the common companions of al-Baqir and al-Sadiq, 2) the companions of al-Sadiq, and 3) the common companions of al-Sadiq and al-Kazim. Jamil as the young companion of al-Sadiq, is considered the most reliable jurist of the second group.

Jamil is said to be one of the carriers of the al-Sadiq's special hadiths, and that the al-Sadiq taught him secrets that he did not teach to others. There is a hadith narrated from al-Sadiq saying "O Jamil! Do not narrate hadiths that are not known to our companions (Shiites), for they will deny you."

== Narrations ==
Jamil narrated nearly three hundred hadiths directly from Ja'far al-Sadiq, Musa al-Kazim, and Ali al-Ridha. In addition, he narrated from fifty or so hadith narrators, most of whom were from the companions of al-Sadiq.

== Works ==
Three compilations have been reported from Jamil: one independently, (referred to as Asl and sometimes as the book) and the other jointly with Murazim ibn Hakim Azdi Mada'ini, and the third jointly with Muhammad ibn Humran.

== Belief ==
Jamil doubted the Imamate of al-Ridha for a short time after the death of al-Kazim and was therefore considered a Waqifite Shia but after considering the evidence indicating the Imamate of al-Ridha, he deviated from this view and became one of the loyalists of al-Ridha. Jamil became blind towards the end of his life and died during the time of al-Ridha.
