= Muhammad al-Baqir =

Fifth of the Twelve Shia Imams

Muhammad al-Baqir مُحَمَّد الْبَاقِرُ Baqir al-'Ilm
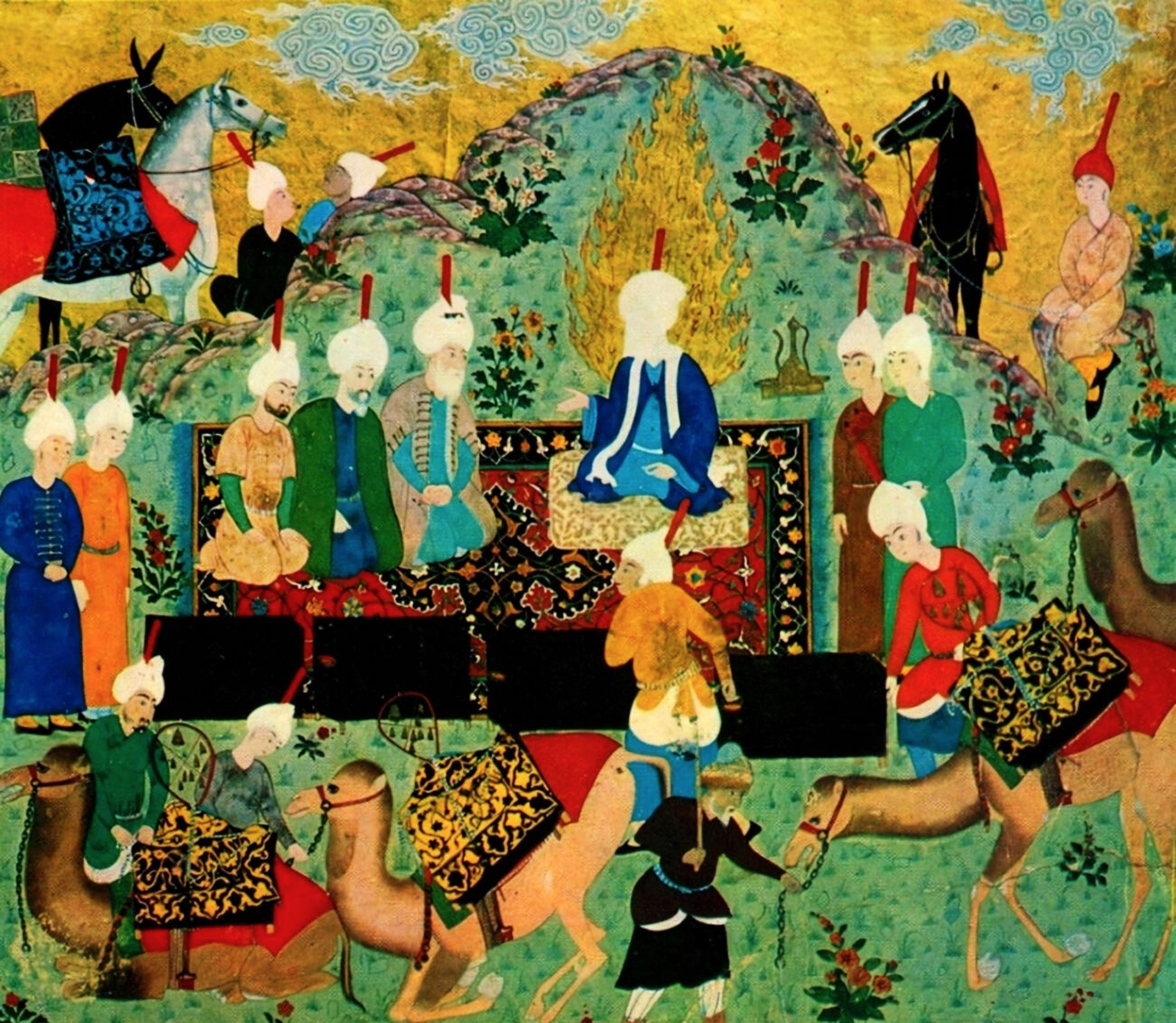
- A 1526 drawing depicting a delegation of merchants from Khorasan visiting al-Baqir

5th Shia imam
- In office 712–732
- Preceded by: Ali al-Sajjad
- Succeeded by: Ja'far al-Sadiq
- Title: Baqir al-'ilm ('The one who splits knowledge open')

Personal life
- Born: c. 676 Medina, Hejaz, Umayyad Caliphate
- Died: c. 732 (aged 57) Medina, Umayyad Caliphate
- Cause of death: Poisoning (Note: Poisoned by Hisham ibn Abd al-Malik according to most Shia scholars, whereas Sunni scholars believe he died a natural death.)
- Resting place: Jannat al-Baqi, Medina; 24°28′1″N 39°36′50.21″E
- Spouse: Umm Farwa bint al-Qāsim; Umm Hakīm bint Usayd ibn al-Mughīra al-Thaqafī
- Children: Ja'far al-Sadiq; Ibrāhīm, ʿAlī, ʿAbd Allāh, Aḥmad, ʿUbayd Allāh, Zaynab, Umm Salama.
- Parents: Ali al-Sajjad; Fatima bint Hasan

Religious life
- Religion: Islam
- Sect: Muslim

Muhammad ibn Ali al-Baqir (Arabic: محمد بن علي الباقر, romanized: Muḥammad ibn ʿAlī al-Bāqir; c. 676 – c. 732) was a descendant of the Islamic prophet Muhammad and the fifth of the Twelve Imams, succeeding his father Ali al-Sajjad. He was the grandson of Husayn on his father’s side, the grandson of Hasan on his mother’s side, therefore a great-grandson of Ali. Al-Baqir was the first Shia Imam descended from both of Muhammad's grandsons. Born in Medina around 676, al-Baqir witnessed the brutal massacre of his grandfather Husayn and his relatives by the forces of the Umayyad caliph Yazid at the Battle of Karbala when he was still a small child. Upon his father's death, al-Baqir was recognised as the next Imam by most followers of his father around 712. These were the Imamites, the forerunners of Twelvers, which now constitute the overwhelming majority of Shia Muslims. Like his father, al-Baqir was politically quiescent but was nevertheless harassed by the Umayyads, especially by caliph Hisham.

Al-Baqir led a pious and scholarly life in Medina, attracting a growing number of followers, students, and visitors. He is credited with laying the doctrinal and legal foundations of Twelver Shia Islam during some twenty years of his Imamate. He significantly contributed to Twelver exegesis of the Quran, and is regarded as the father of Ismaili and Zaydi jurisprudence. Most of al-Baqir's disciples were based in Kufa, many of whom later became outstanding Shia jurists and traditionists. Al-Baqir is also regarded as an authority in law and prophetic tradition in Sunni Islam. Muhammad al-Baqir died around 732, poisoned by the Umayyads. He was succeeded by his eldest son, Ja'far al-Sadiq, who played a pivotal role in the development of Shia theology and jurisprudence. Al-Baqir is buried in the Baqi Cemetery in Medina. The shrine that stood over his grave was demolished, along with the cemetery itself, by Wahhabis in 1806 and again in 1925.

== Ancestry ==
Muhammad al-Baqir was a descendant of the Islamic prophet Muhammad, through both of his grandsons, namely, Hasan and Husayn, who were the second and third of the twelve Shia imams, respectively. More specifically, al-Baqir's father was Husayn's son, Ali al-Sajjad, the fourth of the twelve imams. Muhammad's mother was Fatima Umm Abd Allah, while his maternal grandfather was Hasan.

Hasan and Husayn were the eldest sons of the first Shia imam, Ali ibn Abi Talib, through his first wife, Fatima, daughter of the Islamic prophet.

== Titles ==
Muhammad's kunya is Abu Ja'far, and his honorific title is al-Baqir, short for baqir al-'ilm, which means either 'the one who splits knowledge open' (brings it to light) or 'the one who possesses great knowledge', both of which are references to Muhammad's fame as a religious scholar.

By some accounts, Muhammad was already known in his lifetime by the title al-Baqir. Shia sources posit that this title was designated by the Islamic prophet, who sent his greetings via his companion Jabir ibn Abd Allah, who lived long enough to meet al-Baqir in his childhood. According to another Shia account, Caliph Hisham, a contemporary of al-Baqir, contemptuously referred to him as al-baqara (lit. 'the cow'), which again suggests that he was known by this title in his lifetime. The occasion was the caliph's meeting with al-Baqir's half brother, Zayd ibn Ali, who reprimanded Hisham and attributed al-Baqir's title to the Islamic prophet.

== Biography ==
Muhammad al-Baqir was born in Medina in about 676 CE (56 AH). Twelver Shias annually celebrate this occasion on the third of Safar. In 680, when Muhammad was a small child, his grandfather Husayn and most of his male relatives were massacred in the Battle of Karbala by forces of the Umayyad caliph Yazid. Muhammad was present in Karbala and witnessed the carnage. Muhammad's youth coincided with power struggles between the Umayyads, Abd Allah ibn al-Zubayr, and various Shia groups, while Muhammad's father, al-Sajjad, stayed aloof from politics. When al-Sajjad died around 712, most of his followers accepted the imamate of his son Muhammad, who was about thirty-seven years old. He lived a quiet pious life in Medina, like his father, but was nevertheless harassed by the Umayyads, especially by Caliph Hisham. Muhammad, however, enjoyed certain liberties because the Umayyads were more lenient in this period, or perhaps because they were busy infighting and quelling revolts. During the next twenty years or so, Muhammad al-Baqir thus expounded Shia doctrines and laws, attracting a growing number of followers, students, and visitors.

=== Abd al-Malik (r. 685–705) ===
The fifth Umayyad caliph, Abd al-Malik ibn Marwan, is credited with issuing an Islamic gold coinage for the first time to replace Byzantine coins. This was likely done at the suggestion of al-Baqir.

=== Umar II (r. 717–720) ===
Often praised for his piety, the Umayyad caliph Umar II was favorably disposed to al-Baqir. After meeting with him, the caliph apparently returned the disputed lands of Fadak to Alids, that is, descendants of Ali ibn Abi Talib. In a Sunni tradition, likely circulated by anti-Alids, al-Baqir identifies Umar II as the Mahdi, the promised savior in Islam. In a Shia tradition, however, al-Baqir suggests that Umar's good deeds would not redeem him, for he had usurped the imam's right to rule.

=== Hisham (r. 724–743) ===
Hisham ibn Abd al-Malik summoned al-Baqir to the Umayyad capital Damascus several times and imprisoned him at least once. During these visits, the caliph apparently held theological debates in which al-Baqir emerged victorious. On one occasion, the caliph ordered al-Baqir to join an ongoing archery practice, probably hoping to embarrass him, but was astonished by al-Baqir's excellent marksmanship.

=== Death ===
Although 732 (114 AH) and 735 (117 AH) are commonly reported, there is considerable disagreement about when al-Baqir died, ranging from 732 to 736. He was about fifty-seven years old at the time, and most likely died before Zayd's revolt in 740. Twelvers annually commemorate his death on the seventh of Dhu al-Hijja.

As with the rest of the twelve imams, Shia sources report that al-Baqir was killed. There is no consensus about the details, and different sources accuse Hisham or his successor, al-Walid II (r. 743–744), of poisoning al-Baqir. According to another account, al-Baqir was poisoned by his cousin, Zayd ibn al-Hasan, once the latter failed to wrest control of the Islamic prophet's inheritance from al-Baqir.

Al-Baqir is buried in the Al-Baqi Cemetery in Medina. A shrine stood over his grave until its demolition in 1806 and then again around 1925, both times carried out by Wahhabis.

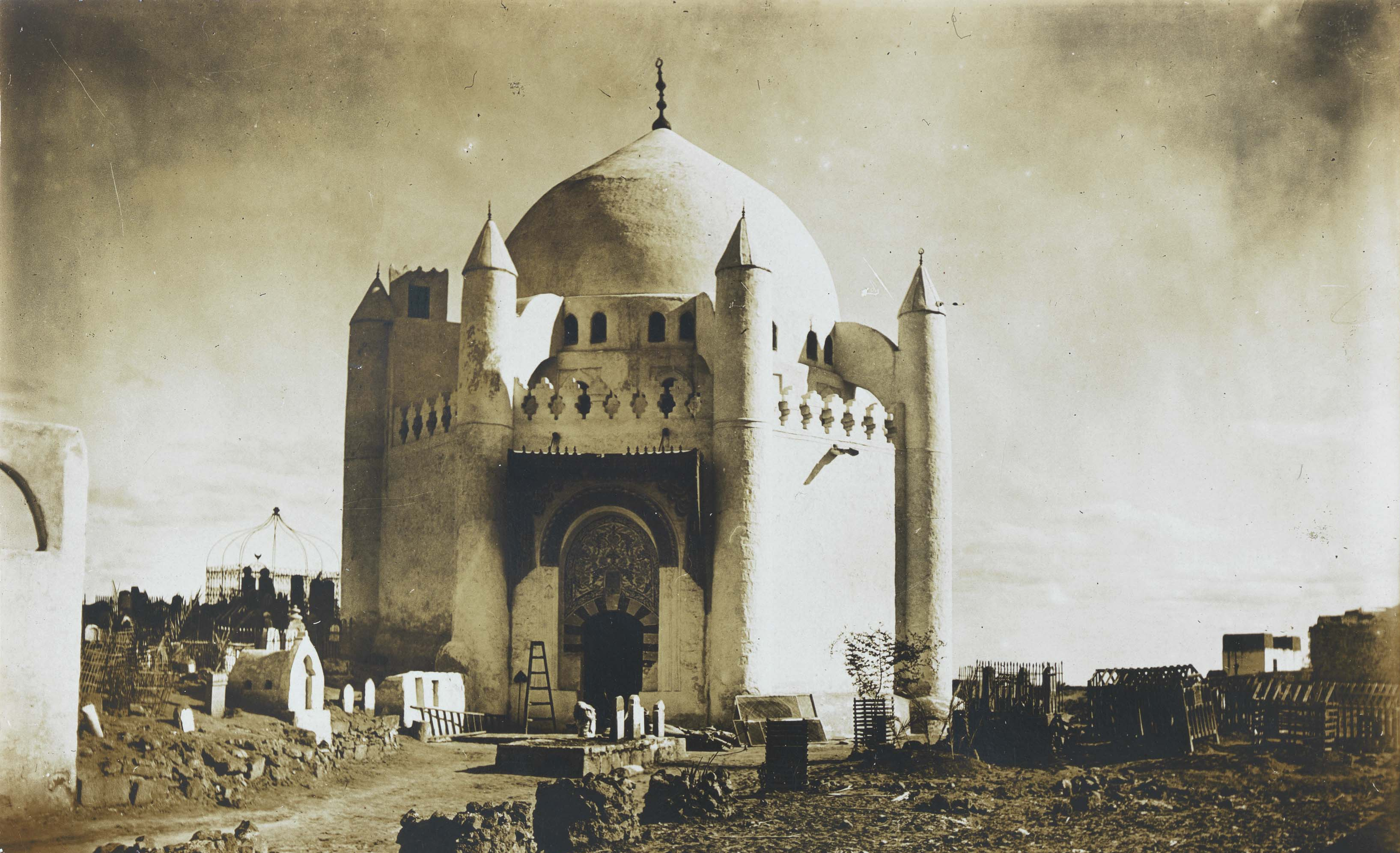
The Al-Baqi Cemetery was destroyed in 1926 during and by the Wahhabis in Saudi Arabia.

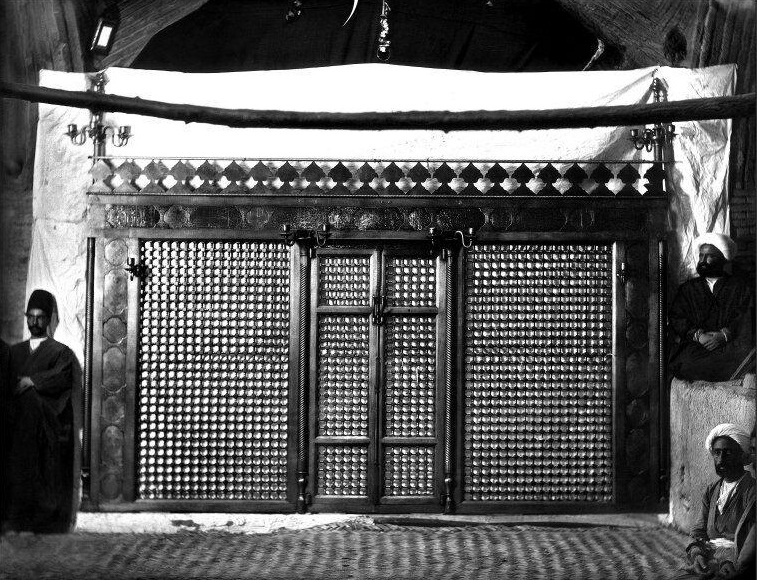
Now-destroyed zarih covering the grave of al-Baqir in the mausoleum of four Shia Imams

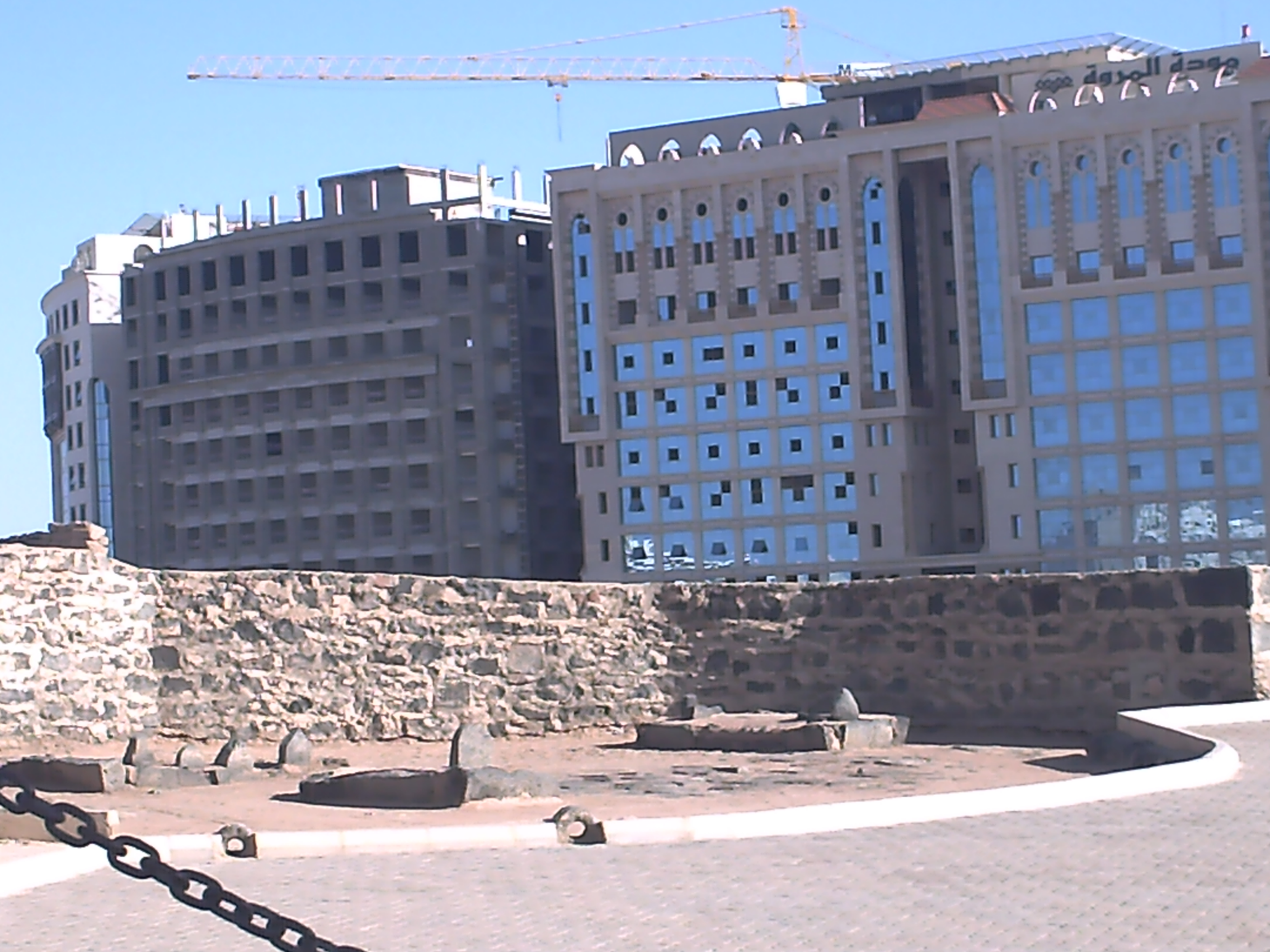
The Imam's destroyed gravesite in the al-Baqi Cemetery in the present

== Imamate ==
Muhammad al-Baqir calligraphy at the Prophet's Mosque in Medina

After al-Sajjad, most of his followers accepted the imamate of his eldest son Muhammad. These were the Imamites, who were the forerunners of Twelver and Isma'ili Shias. Twelver and Isma'ili sources indeed report that al-Sajjad had earlier designated al-Baqir as his successor. Followers of al-Baqir, however, were in minority compared to the rival Kaysanites, which was a (now-extinct) Shia group that traced the imamate through Muhammad ibn al-Hanafiyyah, son of Ali ibn Abi Talib and Khawla bint Ja'far, a woman from the Banu Hanifa tribe. Nevertheless, al-Baqir had an advantage over these non-Fatimid claimants because of his prestigious lineage from Ali ibn Abi Talib and Fatima, the only surviving daughter of the Islamic prophet.

=== Zayd ibn Ali ===
Another claimant to leadership was Zayd ibn Ali, a much younger half-brother of al-Baqir. It is not certain, however, if Zayd was a rival for al-Baqir. Despite their disagreements, relationship between the two brothers is described as cordial. The quiescent al-Baqir even attempted to dissuade the politically active Zayd from rebellion. In 740, not long after al-Baqir's death, Zayd took up arms against the Umayyads but was defeated and killed by Caliph Hisham.

Zayd's activism initially gained him a larger following than al-Baqir, especially because the former accommodated some of the majority views. For instance, even though Zayd regarded Ali ibn Abi Talib more qualified to succeed the Islamic prophet, he refused to condemn the first two caliphs, namely, Abu Bakr and Umar. Such views, however, cost Zayd part of his Shia support, most of whom condemn Abu Bakr and Umar as usurpers of Ali's right to the caliphate. Those Shia Muslims who thus rejected Zayd joined al-Baqir or his son Ja'far. Zayd's rebellion marks the beginning of the Zaydi movement, a Shia subsect that has survived to present day in Yemen. Muhammad al-Baqir also challenged al-Hasan al-Muthanna and two of his sons for controlling the prophet's inheritance and for claiming to be the Mahdi.

=== Politics ===
Like his father, al-Baqir was politically quiescent, to the point that some have suggested that he did not claim the imamate. Indeed, al-Baqir's notion of imamate was based primarily on knowledge rather than political power, although he also considered Shia imams entitled to the latter. Al-Baqir instead focused on religious teaching, attracting a growing number of visitors, students, and followers. He is often credited with laying the foundations of Twelver and Isma'ili doctrines and law. Among key Shia doctrines that took their definitive form under al-Baqir are imamate, sacred alliance (walaya) and separation (bara'a), and religious dissimulation (taqiyya). As for law, al-Baqir is often regarded as the founding father of Twelver and Isma'ili jurisprudence. In particular, al-Baqir's imamate marks the transition of the Shia community to completely rely on their own imams in matters of law and rituals. As for religious dues, al-Baqir accepted gifts but did not collect khums (lit. 'one fifth'), another Islamic alms which was likely enforced by later imams.

=== Ghulat ===
Several traditions of al-Baqir are against the Ghulat (lit. 'exaggerators'). These often conferred divinity on Shia imams or had other extreme beliefs, such as anthropomorphism and metempsychosis. For instance, al-Baqir condemned Mughira ibn Sa'id al-Bajali, who said that the imam was divine. Mughira has also been accused of falsifying al-Baqir's traditions. Similarly, al-Baqir denounced Bayan ibn Sam'an, who apparently claimed to be a prophet.

=== Miracles ===
Some miracles are attributed to al-Baqir in Shia sources. He is reported to have conversed with animals, returned sight to a blind, and foretold future events, such Zayd's death in battle, collapse of the Umayyads, and the accession of the Abbasid caliph, al-Mansur (r. 754–775).

=== Succession ===
When al-Baqir died, most of his followers accepted the imamate of his eldest son Ja'far, aged about thirty-seven at the time. Ja'far is often known by the honorific al-Sadiq (lit. 'the truthful'). On multiple occasions, al-Baqir seems to have told his followers about his preference for Ja'far. Apparently some did not accept al-Baqir's death and awaited his return as the Mahdi. After al-Baqir's death, some Ghulat figures claimed to have inherited extraordinary powers from him, including Bayan ibn Sam'an and Abu Mansur al-Ijli.

== Appearance and character ==
The Shia scholar Ibn Shahrashub (d. 1192) describes al-Baqir as medium height, with delicate skin and slightly curly hair. He adds that al-Baqir had birthmarks, one on his cheek, and that he had a beautiful voice and a slender waist. By contrast, al-Mufid (d. 1022), another Shia scholar, describes al-Baqir as a "well-built man", as translated by the Islamicist I.K.A. Howard, or "big-bodied", as translated by M. Pierce, another Islamicist. Such differences may reflect the changing social standards over centuries. Muhammad al-Baqir is said to have been extremely generous, pious, and peaceful by nature.

According to some Shia accounts, al-Baqir did not spare himself and his family from wearing good clothes and eating delicious food, and this behavior attracted attention at a time when the tendencies of giving up the world were widespread. He used to work in the field to earn a living on par with his servants, and the motivation for this work, he said, was obedience to God and not needing people. According to a narration by Ja'far al-Sadiq, al-Baqir had less income but more expenses compared to other family members. He treated his relatives with good food and gave them good clothes. He also helped his servants in difficult tasks. According to Ibn Asakir and Ibn Qutaybah, although he was saddened by his son's illness, he did not mourn his death, because he considered this to be an act of opposition to God.

== Contributions ==
In his lifetime, al-Baqir was regarded as a prominent transmitter of prophetic traditions. As a Shia imam, al-Baqir's own sayings and deeds have also been recorded in Shia sources, including some fifteen percent of the traditions collected in the celebrated Man La Yahduruhu al-Faqih. Such is the extent of his contributions that Shia traditions attributed to al-Baqir and his successor al-Sadiq outnumber all other Shia imams and the prophet combined. As the first Shia imam who engaged in systematic teaching, al-Baqir is also credited with laying the doctrinal and legal foundations of Twelver Shi'ism, which were further developed by al-Sadiq. Contributions of al-Baqir to Twelver doctrine and law are collected in the six-volume Musnad al-Imam al-Baqir, compiled by A. al-Utaridi. Al-Baqir may also be regarded as the father of Isma'ili and Zaydi jurisprudence. Finally, al-Baqir significantly contributed to Twelver exegesis of the Quran and two commentaries are attributed to him.

=== Contributions to theology ===
==== Imamate ====
Al-Baqir's doctrine of imamate, further elaborated by his successor al-Sadiq, characterised the necessary qualities of imams, particularly their divinely-inspired designation (nass), their esoteric knowledge (ilm), and their infallibility (isma), all of which distinguished imams as the best of mankind, representatives of God on earth, and the only source of spiritual guidance. In particular, after Muhammad, they are the only authoritative interpreters of the Quran, the exalted part of which actually refers to them and Muhammad. In contrast, as the executer of religious laws, imamate or caliphate is essentially a political function in Sunni Islam, where caliphs are ideally appointed by consensus, although hereditary caliphate is the norm.

In al-Baqir's view, imamate is confined to descendants of the Islamic prophet Muhammad, from the marriage of his daughter Fatima to his cousin Ali ibn Abi Talib. Following a divine mandate, each imam is designated by his predecessor (nass), beginning with Ali himself who was designated by the prophet at the Ghadir Khumm. For instance, al-Baqir cited the Quranic verse 2:124, according to which, God designated Abraham as imam and also granted this favor to those of his progeny who are not evildoers. Crucially, the hereditary nature of imamate in al-Baqir's doctrine closed the field to outside claimants. Nass is often accompanied in Shia sources by inheritance of secret religious scrolls and the prophet's weapons. The latter paralleled the Ark of the Covenant for the Israelites.

In al-Baqir's doctrine, imams are distinguished by their esoteric knowledge, which they inherited from Ali. In turn, Ali received this knowledge from the prophet, a reference to the well-known prophetic tradition, "I am the city of knowledge and Ali is its gate." In particular, imams know the true exegesis (ta'wil) of the Quran, a reference to the famous hadith of the thaqalayn, attributed to the prophet. Al-Baqir's doctrine of imamate was thus primarily based on knowledge rather than political power, although he also considered imams entitled to the latter. The divinely-inspired knowledge of imams and prophets are similar but imams could only hear (and not see) the archangels, according to al-Baqir.

According to al-Baqir, imams also inherit certain spiritual and primordial lights (nur) referenced in the Quran.Their divine knowledge and spiritual light protect imams from sins, for which al-Baqir cited the verse of purification. Already in his lifetime, some followers of al-Baqir regarded him as infallible.

By implication, al-Baqir's doctrine gave imams absolute spiritual authority over Muslims, resting on the absolute authority of the prophet. His doctrine also held imams as the sole spiritual guides in life and the source of intercession in the afterlife. In al-Baqir's view, imams are the highest proofs (sing. hujja) of God and guides towards Him, without whom the world cannot exist for a moment. Not only obedience to imams is obligatory in al-Baqir's interpretation of the verse of obedience, but love for them is also mandated in his exegesis of the verse of mawadda. Shias thus form an all-encompassing bond of spiritual loyalty (walaya) with their imams, who are both masters and supportive friends in the journey of the spirit. Identifying his imam is a religious duty for every Muslim, and those who die without knowing their imam have died a death of ignorance (Jahilliya). Furthermore, willfull opposition to imams is a grave sin and staunch enemies of imams are destined for hellfire.

To support his theory, al-Baqir relied on his interpretations of various Quranic verses and prophetic traditions. For instance, al-Baqir emphasised his interpretation of the verse of walaya, according to which Ali was granted the guardianship (walaya) of Muslims, on par with the prophet. According to al-Baqir, fearing backlash from some, the prophet was reluctant to publicly announce the walaya of Ali until he was spurred to do so (at the Ghadir Khumm) by the verse of tabligh. The prophetic traditions that al-Baqir invoked include the hadith of the Ghadir Khumm and the hadith of the position.

==== Nature of God ====
A hotly debated issue at the time was whether the Quran, thought to be the word of God, was created or eternal. Those who believed in predetermination argued that the Quran was eternal for God has always known the events referenced in the Quran. In contrast, those who advocated for free will thought that the Quran was created in time. Al-Baqir held that the Quran was neither created nor eternal. Rather, it is the word of the Creator.

More generally, al-Baqir held that all attributes of God were eternal but only as adjectives. For instance, "knowing", "hearing", and "seeing" are how God characterises himself. These help believers understand something about God but are not to be confused with Him. In al-Baqir's view, God is beyond human imagination. He thus advised his followers to discuss God's creation rather than his nature. When asked if he has seen God, al-Baqir responded that God could not be seen by eyes but can be apprehended by the inner reality of faith. On another controversial topic, al-Baqir held that God was a thing, but a thing incomparable to all other things, something neither cognisable nor delimited.

==== Faith (iman) ====
By definition, a mu'min (lit. '[true] believer') and a Muslim are characterised, respectively, by the two notions of iman (lit. 'faith') and islam (lit. 'submission [to God]'). Citing the Quranic verse 49:14, al-Baqir defined Muslims as those who confess Islam in words and outwardly practice Islamic rites, such as praying and fasting. In his view, however, iman is more exclusive than islam, that is, the former implies the latter but not vice versa. More specifically, al-Baqir held that mu'min is a Muslim with inner faith, a faith demonstrated through fulfillment of religious duties. The foremost among these duties is the walaya to (Shia) imams. There are indeed numerous traditions attributed to al-Baqir about walaya, the importance of which, in his view, is such that one's good deeds would not be accepted without walaya. Yet al-Baqir also curtailed this absolutist perspective by emphasising that walaya cannot be attained without virtue and piety. In addition to walaya, al-Baqir listed the remaining duties of a mu'min as tahara (lit. 'purification'), prayer, fasting, pilgrimage (Hajj), and jihad (striving in God's way). He also listed sabr (lit. 'patience'), yaqin (lit. 'certitude [in God]'), adl (lit. 'justice'), and (jihad) as the pillars of iman.

Al-Baqir thus identified an intermediate state between iman and kufr (disbelief). This gray area was further characterised by his successor al-Sadiq, who held that a Muslim who does not harbor enmity towards the Ahl al-Bayt and their followers is neither mu'min nor kafir (disbeliever). That is, such non-Shias are considered Muslims, with their due legal rights, but not (true) believers.

By implication, al-Baqir considered righteous action as an integral component of iman, a view that sharply differed from Murji'ites and Kharijites, two contemporary currents. The former did not consider good conduct essential to iman, with the political implication that dissent and disobedience were discouraged, even if Muslim rulers were corrupt. For Kharijites, in contrast, anyone who committed a mortal sin automatically apostated.

In al-Baqir's view, iman had degrees of perfection and could vary over time. In particular, he held that new (religious) knowledge, when put into action, would strengthen one's iman. Later Sunni thought similarly adopted the notion of gradated iman.

==== Predestination ====
Under Umayyads, predestination, the belief that God has pre-ordained everything, was likely promoted to justify their rule and encourage moral complacency. In contrast, there were others who believed in free will. Among this latter group, some held that all that is good is created by God and everything bad is from men. Al-Baqir rejected both views, saying that there was a third position between predestination and free will. He argued that God is too merciful to force his creatures to sin and then punish them and that He is too mighty to will a thing that would not transpire. In words of his successor al-Sadiq, God predestined some things but left others to man.

Closely related is the early doctrine of bada', that is, advancement or postponement of an act of creation, depending on circumstances, without any change to the overall design and intention of God. The doctrine of bada' thus describes an intermediate position between predestination and free will: God's decision on some matters remain suspended, according to al-Baqir, subject to advancement and postponement, until the autonomous choice of His creatures has occurred. Only then His definite decision is made. In turn, bada' is closely tied to the concept of abrogation (naskh) of some verses of the Quran.

==== Religious dissimulation (taqiyya) ====
Muhammad al-Baqir is often credited with formulating the Shia doctrine of taqiyya, that is, precautionary dissimulation to avoid persecution. Taqiyya was intended for the survival of Shia imams and their followers, for Shias were molested in al-Baqir's time to the point that he thought that it was easier to be a nonbeliever (zindiq). Traditions attributed to al-Baqir thus encourage his followers to hide their faith for their safety, some even characterising taqiyya as a pillar of faith. For instance, al-Baqir is not known to have publicly reviled Abu Bakr and Umar, most likely because he exercised taqiyya. Indeed, al-Baqir's conviction that the Islamic prophet had explicitly designated Ali ibn Abi Talib as his successor implies that Abu Bakr and Umar lacked legitimacy. Al-Baqir's quiescent views sharply differed from Mu'tazilites, who held that enjoining good and forbidding wrong should be enforced by force, if necessary.

The notion of taqiyya was not unfamiliar to early Muslims. When Ammar, an early companion of the Islamic prophet, renounced his faith under torture, Muhammad is said to have approved his conduct. The Quranic verse 16:106 is often connected to this episode. Other Quranic verses suggest that Abraham and Joseph both practice dissimulation, the former when he said he was ill and the latter when his brother was accused of theft.

==== Religious dissociation (al-bara'a) ====
Al-Baqir also taught the doctrine of al-bara'a, that is, dissociation from the first three caliphs and the majority of the prophet's companions as enemies of Shia imams. Indeed, Imamites regard the early caliphs as usurpers of Ali's right to succeed the prophet.

=== Contributions to jurisprudence ===
Al-Baqir founded what later developed into the Twelver school of law and consolidated some characteristic practices of the Shia. For instance, in the call to daily prayer (adhan), al-Baqir added the expression hayy ala khayr al-amal (lit. 'come to the best of deed'), an expression that was removed by Umar, according to Shia and some early Sunni sources. Al-Baqir also defended muta (lit. 'temporary') marriage, saying that it was a practice sanctioned by the Islamic prophet, but later abandoned by Umar. In these rulings, al-Baqir thus sided with Ali ibn Abi Talib and Ibn Abbas, two influential figures in early Islam. Another distinct ruling of al-Baqir was that wiping one's footwear before prayer, though common at the time, was unacceptable as a substitute for washing one's feet. Al-Baqir also forbade all intoxicants, whereas Kufan jurists of his time permitted fermented drinks (nabidth). He also maintained that, under threat of death or injury, self-protection through dissimulation (taqiya) is obligatory. Finally, al-Manasik is an extant treatise on the rituals of Hajj, attributed to al-Baqir and narrated by his disciple Abu al-Jurad Ziyad ibn Mundhir.

Shia imams expected their disciples to seek (and then follow) their advice about new legal questions, or else answer those questions by applying limited reasoning within the general framework provided by imams. Al-Baqir is indeed known to have rebuked those who went beyond this framework, including Muhammad ibn al-Hakim and Muhammad al-Tayyar. In particular, al-Baqir discouraged his followers from ijtihad (individual reasoning) or applying ra'y (lit. 'personal opinion') and qiyas (lit. 'analogy'). He considered these methods speculative and lacking in religious authority, which, in his view, was limited to Shia imams as the only authoritative interpretors of the Quran and the prophetic tradition (sunna).

=== Contributions to Quranic exegesis ===
Muhammad al-Baqir is credited with the Quranic exegesis Kitab al-Baqir (lit. 'Book of al-Baqir'), narrated by his disciple Ibn al-Mundhir. Parts of this work have survived in Tafsir al-Qummi, written by the Twelver scholar al-Qummi (d. 919). This commentary is ranked first by the Twelver bibliographer al-Najashi (d. c. 1058) among early Quranic commentaries. Similarly, Tafsir Jabir al-Ju'fi is a collection of exegetical traditions, ascribed to al-Baqir and narrated by his disciple Jabir ibn Yazid al-Ju'fi. In Tafsir Nur al-Thaqalayn, an extensive Twelver exegesis of the Quran, al-Baqir is the authority for thirteen percent of its traditions, behind only the prophet and al-Sadiq.

== Notable disciples ==
Muhammad al-Baqir may have been the first Shia imam who systematically taught Shia beliefs. Even though he lived in Medina, the main following of al-Baqir was in Kufa, where he attracted a number of distinguished theologians. Basra, Mecca, and Syria were other places where al-Baqir's students were based. More than four hundred and sixty names are listed as students of al-Baqir in al-Rijal, a Twelver work on biographical evaluation authored by al-Kashahi (d. c. 941).

=== Kufa ===
Al-Baqir had several distinguished disciples in Kufa, where Jabir al-Ju'fi was his main representative. Jabir is the authority for some traditions in Umm al-Kitab, which parallels Infancy Gospel of Thomas in gnostic Christology. In its "Apocalypse of Jabir", al-Baqir confides to Jabir how the cosmos were created, how men descended to this world, and how they can gain deliverance from it. Some have accused Jabir of extremism (ghuluw) and his reliability is debated in Shia circles. Risalat al-Ju'fi is said to contain Jabir's views about Isma'ilism.

Zurara ibn A'yan was already a prominent traditionist and theologian before joining al-Baqir's circle. Zurara apparently disagreed with al-Baqir about some theological issues. For instance, unlike al-Baqir, Zurara argued that there is no intermediate state between a believer and a nonbeliever. By some accounts, Zurara later fell out with al-Sadiq, but perhaps the imam distanced himself from Zurara only in public to save the latter from persecution.

Aban ibn Taghlib was another associate of al-Baqir and later of al-Sadiq. An outstanding jurist, Aban was authorised by al-Baqir to issue legal rulings for the public. Despite his Shia tendencies, Aban's traditions have been cited in Sunni sources. Abu Basir al-Asadi is among the consensus companions of al-Baqir and al-Sadiq, that is, those whose traditions are generally accepted in Shia circles. Muhammad ibn Muslim, another close associate of al-Baqir and al-Sadiq, was a prominent jurist and traditionist, who is said to have transmitted some thirty thousand traditions from al-Baqir. Fudayl ibn Yasar was another favorite of al-Baqir and al-Sadiq, whom the latter apparently compared to Salman al-Farsi, the famous companion of the Islamic prophet. Abu al-Qasim al-Ijli and Abu Basir al-Muradi, both notable jurists and traditionists, were associates of al-Baqir and al-Sadiq. Abu Hamza al-Thumali and Abu Khalid al-Kabuli, were two followers of al-Baqir and earlier of al-Sajjad. In particular, some traditions narrated by Abu Hamza are of miraculous nature.

Al-Kumayt ibn Zayd al-Asadi was a poet supporter of al-Baqir, praised by him for laudatory poems about the Ahl al-Bayt. Kumayt's Hashimiyyat, in praise of the Ahl al-Bayt, is indeed considered among the earliest evidence for the doctrine of imamate, and perhaps the earliest dateable reference to the Ghadir Khumm. Likely to avoid persecution, Kumayt also occasionally wrote in praise of the Umayyads. Mu'min al-Taq was another follower of al-Baqir, who wrote and debated about imamate. Ibn Mundhir was a close disciple of al-Baqir and the principal transmitter of Tafsir al-Baqir He later supported Zayd's rebellion and founded the Jarudiyya, the Zaydi sect closest in doctrine to Twelver Shi'ism.

=== Elsewhere ===
Basra was not a Shia center, but al-Baqir had a few notable disciples there, including Muhammad ibn Marwan al-Basri, Isma'il ibn Fadl al-Hashemi, Malek ibn A'yan al-Juhani. In Mecca, al-Baqir's circle included Ma'ruf ibn Kharbuz Makki and Maymun ibn al-Aswad al-Qaddah. The latter was likely a merchant and in charge of al-Baqir's property in Mecca. One of Maymun's sons, Abdullah, is the alleged ancestor of Isma'ili imams. Elsewhere, prominent followers of al-Baqir included Muhammad ibn Isma'il Bazi and other members of Bazi's family, Abu Harun and his namesake, Abu Harun Makfuf, and also Uqba ibn Bashir al-Asadi, Aslam al-Makki, and Najiyy ibn Abi Mu'adh ibn Muslim.

== Views ==
=== Sunni view ===
Muhammad al-Baqir is regarded as a reliable (thiqa) traditionist in Sunni Islam, distinct in that he accepted only those prophetic traditions that had been reported by his predecessors. Among those scholars who drew from al-Baqir's traditions are al-Shafi'i (d. 820) and Ibn Hanbal (d. 855), the eponymous founders of the Hanbali and Shafi'i schools of law, respectively, and the famed Sunni historian al-Tabari (d. 923). In particular, al-Baqir is the authority for over a hundred traditions in the six canonical collections of Sunni hadith. However, some have criticised al-Baqir for directly quoting individuals who had died before him.

Despite al-Baqir's reputation as a reliable traditionist, he is rarely cited in Sunni collections of hadith, compared to their Shia counterparts. This might be because Sunni traditionists "picked and chose" from traditions attributed to al-Baqir, or perhaps because they intentionally discarded the numerous Shia-colored traditions attributed to him. Those traditions of al-Baqir that do appear in Sunni collections have different chains of transmission compared to their Shia counterparts. These Sunni traditions portray al-Baqir as a proto-Sunni scholar who denounced Shias and their beliefs. For instance, unlike Shia sources, later Sunni authors maintain that al-Baqir supported Abu Bakr and Umar, called them imams, and said that one should pray behind Umayyads.

In Sunni Islam, al-Baqir is also regarded as an authority in jurisprudence. For instance, Abu Hanifa (d. 767), the eponym of the Hanafi school of law, Ibn Jurayj (d. 767), and Awza'i (d. 774) deferred to al-Baqir in legal matters.

The Sunni attitude towards al-Baqir is reflected in the following reports. The exegesis attributed to al-Baqir tops the list of Quranic works compiled by the Sunni bibliographer Ibn al-Nadim (d. c. 995). Abd Allah ibn Ata al-Makki thought that other scholars felt humbled in al-Baqir's presence. According to the Sunni traditionist Muhammad ibn Munkadir (d. 747), al-Baqir was the only scholar who surpassed his father, al-Sajjad. Sunni sources also describe Abu Hanifa as a prominent disciple of al-Baqir, even saying that the latter prophesied that the former would revive the sunna.

=== Twelver and Isma'ili view ===
Muhammad al-Baqir is an imam for Twelvers and Isma'ilis, who constitute the overwhelming majority of Shia Muslims. For them, after the prophet, Shia imams are regarded as the sole source of religious guidance, fostering an all-encompassing bond of loyalty (walaya) with their Shias. Al-Baqir is also regarded as a founding authority in Shia jurisprudence, and a significant contributor to Shia theology. Al-Baqir is considered here as the foremost religious authority of his time, unlike Sunnism. His status is such that a tradition with interrupted or broken chain of transmission would be deemed reliable when narrated by him.

=== Zaydi view ===
Muhammad al-Baqir is a prominent figure in Zaydism. His traditions appear in some Zaydi works, and he has heavily influenced Zaydi jurisprudence. However, the quiescent al-Baqir is generally not recognised as an imam in Zaydism, for Zaydi imams are required to be politically active. In Zaydi works, al-Baqir acknowledges Zayd's superior knowledge and implicitly Zayd's claims to the imamate.

=== Sufi view ===
Muhammad al-Baqir is regarded as a founding figure in Sufism, where he is noted for his asceticism and piety. In Sufism, al-Baqir is portrayed as an authority in esoteric sciences and the hidden dimensions of the Quran, and a gnostic who performed miracles (karamat). It is related that al-Baqir defined Sufism as "goodness of disposition: He that has the better disposition is the better Sufi."

== Family ==
Muhammad al-Baqir was married to Umm Farwa, who bore him two sons. One of them was Ja'far, who later succeeded al-Baqir. Umm Hakim, daughter of Usayd al-Thaqafi, was al-Baqir's other wife, from whom two more sons were born, although both died in childhood. Al-Baqir had three more sons, all of whom were born to a concubine. According to the Shia genealogist Alawi al-Umari, al-Baqir's lineage has continued only through Ja'far.

Ancestors of Muhammad al-Baqir

8. Ali ibn Abi Talib (= 12)
4. Husayn ibn Ali
9. Fatima bint Muhammad (= 13)
2. Ali ibn Husayn Zayn al-Abidin
10. Yazdegerd III of Persia
5. Shahrbanu
1. Muhammad al-Baqir
12. Ali ibn Abi Talib (= 8)
6. Hasan ibn Ali
13. Fatima bint Muhammad (= 9)
3. Fatima bint al-Hasan
14. Talha ibn Ubayd Allah
7. Umm Ishaq bint Talha
15. Al-Jarba bint Qasama

== See also ==
- Family tree of Muhammad
- Ali al-Sajjad
- Jafar al-Sadiq
- Jabir ibn Abd Allah
- Zayd ibn Ali
- Zaydism
- Mashhad Ardehal

== Sources ==
- Amir-Moezzi, M.A. (1994). Guide divin dans le Shi'isme originel [The Divine Guide in Early Shi'ism: The Sources of Esotericism in Islam]. Translated by Streight, D. Albany: State University of New York. ISBN 0791421228.
- Amir-Moezzi, M.A. (2014). "Ghadīr Khumm". In Fleet, K.; Krämer, G.; Matringe, D.; Nawas, J.; Stewart, D.J. (eds.). Encyclopaedia of Islam (Third ed.). doi:10.1163/1573-3912_ei3_COM_27419. ISBN 9789004269613.
- Amir-Moezzi, M.A.; Jambet, C. (2018). What is Shi'i Islam: An Introduction. Translated by Casler, K.; Ormsby, E. Routledge. ISBN 9781138093737.
- Bar-Asher, M.M. (2014). "Introduction". In Daftary, F.; Miskinzoda, G. (eds.). The Study of Shi'i Islam: History, Theology, and Law. I.B.Tauris. pp. 79–93. ISBN 9781780765068.
- Buckley, R.P. (2020). "Muḥammad al-Bāqir". In Fleet, K.; Krämer, G.; Matringe, D.; Nawas, J.; Stewart, D.J. (eds.). Encyclopaedia of Islam (Three ed.). doi:10.1163/1573-3912_ei3_COM_36641. ISBN 9789004413443.
- Corbin, H. (2001). The History of Islamic Philosophy. Translated by Sherrard, L.; Sherrard, P. Kegan Paul International.
- Crow, K.D. (2015). "Imam Ja'far al-Sadiq and the Elaboration of Shi'ism". In Daftary, F.; Sajoo, A.; Jiwa, S. (eds.). The Shi'i World: Pathways in Tradition and Modernity. I.B. Tauris. pp. 56–77. ISBN 9780857729675.
- Daftary, F. (2013). A History of Shi'i Islam. I.B. Tauris. ISBN 9780857723338.
- Daftary, F. (2015). "Shi'i Communities in History". In Daftary, F.; Sajoo, A.; Jiwa, S. (eds.). The Shi'i World: Pathways in Tradition and Modernity. I.B. Tauris. pp. 169–209. ISBN 9780857729675.
- Dakake, M.M. (2007). The Charismatic Community: Shi'ite Identity in Early Islam. State University of New York Press. ISBN 9780791470336.
- Haider, N. (2011). The Origins of the Shi'a: Identity, Ritual, and Sacred Space in Eighth-Century Kūfa. Cambridge University Press. ISBN 9781107424951.
- Haider, N. (2014). Shi'i Islam: An Introduction. Cambridge University Press. ISBN 9781107031432.
- Haywood, J.A. (2024). "Ja'far al-Ṣādiq". Encyclopedia Britannica.
- Hoyland, R.G. (2015). In God's Path: The Arab Conquests and the Creation of an Islamic Empire. Oxford University Press. ISBN 9780199916368.
- Jafri, S.H.M. (1979). Origins and Early Development of Shi'a Islam. Longman. ISBN 0582780802.
- Kohlberg, E. (2012a). "Muḥammad b. 'Alī Zayn al-'Ābidīn". In Bearman, P.; Bianquis, Th.; Bosworth, C.E.; van Donzel, E.; Heinrichs, W.P. (eds.). Encyclopaedia of Islam (Second ed.). doi:10.1163/1573-3912_islam_SIM_5346. ISBN 9789004161214.
- Kohlberg, E. (2012b). "Zayn al-'Ābidīn". In Bearman, P.; Bianquis, Th.; Bosworth, C.E.; van Donzel, E.; Heinrichs, W.P. (eds.). Encyclopaedia of Islam (Second ed.). doi:10.1163/1573-3912_islam_SIM_8144. ISBN 9789004161214.
- Kohlberg, E. (2012c). "al-Rāfiḍa". In Bearman, P.; Bianquis, Th.; Bosworth, C.E.; van Donzel, E.; Heinrichs, W.P. (eds.). Encyclopaedia of Islam (Second ed.). ISBN 9789004161214.
- Kohlberg, E. (2014). "Introduction". In Daftary, F.; Miskinzoda, G. (eds.). The Study of Shi'i Islam: History, Theology and Law. I.B. Tauris. pp. 165–179. ISBN 9781780765068.
- Lalani, A.R. (2000). Early Shī'ī Thought: The Teachings of Imam Muḥammad al-Bāqir. I.B. Tauris. ISBN 1850435928.
- Lalani, A.R. (2005). "Muhammad al-Baqir". In Meri, J.W. (ed.). Medieval Islamic Civilization: An Encyclopedia (First ed.). Routledge. pp. 523–524. ISBN 9780415966900.
- Madelung, W. (1983). "Abu'l-Jārūd Hamdānī". Encyclopædia Iranica. Vol. I/3. pp. 327–328.
- Madelung, W. (2012). "Zayd b. 'Alī b. al-Ḥusayn". In Bearman, P.; Bianquis, Th.; Bosworth, C. E.; van Donzel, E.; Heinrichs, W. P. (eds.). Encyclopaedia of Islam (Second ed.). doi:10.1163/1573-3912_islam_SIM_8137. ISBN 9789004161214.
- Madelung, W. (2014b). "Early Imāmī Theology as Reflected in the Kitāb al-kāfi of al-Kulaynī". In Daftary, F.; Miskinzoda, G. (eds.). The Study of Shi'i Islam: History, Theology, and Law. I.B.Tauris. pp. 465–474. ISBN 9781780765068.
- Madelung, W. (2014a). "Introduction". In Daftary, F.; Miskinzoda, G. (eds.). The Study of Shi'i Islam: History, Theology, and Law. I.B.Tauris. pp. 455–463. ISBN 9781780765068.
- Mavani, H. (2013). Religious Authority and Political Thought in Twelver Shi'ism: From Ali to Post-Khomeini. Routledge. ISBN 9780203694282.
- Melchert, C. (2014). "Renunciation (Zuhd') in the Early Shi'i Tradition". In Daftary, F.; Miskinzoda, G. (eds.). The Study of Shi'i Islam: History, Theology, and Law. I.B.Tauris. pp. 272–294. ISBN 9781780765068.
- Modarressi, H. (2003). Tradition and Survival: A Bibliographical Survey of Early Shī'ite Literature. Vol. 1. Oneworld Academic. ISBN 9781851683314.
- Momen, M. (1985). An Introduction to Shi'i Islam. Yale University Press. ISBN 9780300035315.
- Pakatchi, A. (2020). "ابو بصیر" [Abu Basir]. Center for the Great Islamic Encyclopedia (in Persian).
- Pierce, M. (2016). Twelve Infallible Men: The Imams and the Making of Shi'ism. Harvard University Press. ISBN 9780674737075.
- Rippin, A. (2014). "What Defines a (Pre-Modern) Shi'i Tafsīr? Notes towards the History of the Genre of Tafsīr in Islam, in the Light of the Shi'i Contribution". In Daftary, F.; Miskinzoda, G. (eds.). The Study of Shi'i Islam: History, Theology, and Law. I.B.Tauris. pp. 95–112. ISBN 9781780765068.
- Takim, L.N. (2006). The Heirs of the Prophet: Charisma and Religious Authority in Shi'ite Islam. State University of New York Press. ISBN 9780791467381.
- Taremi, H. (2014). "Al-Baqir, Muhammad ibn Ali". Encyclopaedia of the World of Islam (in Persian). Vol. 1. Encyclopaedia Islamica Foundation.
- Vida, G.L.D. (2012). "K̲h̲ārid̲j̲ij̲tes". In Houtsma, M.Th.; Arnold, T.W.; Basset, R.; Hartmann, R. (eds.). Encyclopaedia of Islam (First ed.). doi:10.1163/2214-871X_ei1_COM_0134. ISBN 9789004082656.
- Werner, E. (2010). "Baqī' al-Gharqad". In Fleet, K.; Krämer, G.; Matringe, D.; Nawas, J.; Stewart, D. J. (eds.). Encyclopaedia of Islam (Third ed.). doi:10.1163/1875-9831_isla_SIM_00000066. ISBN 9789004183902. S2CID 240012569.

Shia Islam titles
Preceded by Zayn al-‘Ābidīn (‘Alī ibn Ḥusayn)	5th Imam of Twelver and 4th Imam of Ismaili Shia; 713–732	Succeeded by Jaʿfar ibn Muhammad al-Sādiq
