= Safwan ibn Yahya =

Safwan ibn Yahya al-Bajali صفوان بن يحيى البجالي

Personal life
- Era: Islamic Golden Age
- Region: Iraq
- Known for: Hadith, Fiqh

Religious life
- Religion: Islam
- Denomination: Shia
- Creed: Twelver

Muslim leader
- Disciple of: Musa al-Kadhim, Ali al-Ridha, Muhammad al-Jawad
- Students: Al-Fadl ibn Shadhan

Safwan bin Yahya al-Bajali (Arabic: صفوان بن يحيى البجالي) was a Shia Muslim companion of the seventh, eighth and ninth Shia Imams Musa al-Kadhim (c. 765–799), Ali al-Ridha (c. 799–818) and Muhammad al-Jawad (c. 818–835) respectively. Shia scholars Shaykh Tusi and Ahmad ibn Ali al-Najashi describe him as one of the most trustworthy and authentic narrators of Hadiths. His piety and faith were well-known such that it's said that Safwan would offer one hundred and fifty Rakat during night, and fasted for three months every year. His nisba indicates he was from the tribe of Bajila. He died in 210 AH/825 CE in Medina and was buried in Al-Baqi'.

Banner of Bajila, the tribe of Safwan ibn Yahya

== His piety ==
It is said that one day a man asked him to carry two dinar for him and deliver them to his family in Kufa. Safwan said "My camels are hired and I have to take the permission of the tenants." It is also said that he made a promise to two of his pious friends that if they died before him, he would do for them what they do for themselves of good deeds and charity, as long as he is alive and did so.

== His jurisprudence ==
Safwan is known as one of famous jurisprudents of his time. He wrote about thirty books including the books of Wudu, Prayer, Fasting, the Hajj, Zakat, Marriage, Divorce, Obligations, Recommendations, Buying and Selling, Setting slaves free and Management, Good tidings and others.

== See also ==
- Muhammad al-Jawad
- Zakaria ibn Idris Ash'ari Qomi
- Ahmad ibn Ishaq Ash'ari Qomi
