= Muhammad bin Muslim =

Shia Muslim scholar and disciple of Muhammad al-Baqir and Ja'far al-Sadiq

Muḥammad ibn Muslim
- محمّد بن مسلم

Personal life
- Born: 80 AH / 699-700 AD Kufa
- Died: 150 AH / 767-768 AD
- Notable work: al-Arba'mi'a mas'ala fi abwab al-halal wa l-haram
- Other name: Abu Ja'far

Religious life
- Religion: Islam
- Denomination: Shia

Muslim leader
- Disciple of: Muhammad al-Baqir, Ja'far al-Sadiq
- Influenced: Abu Hanifa

Muḥammad ibn Muslim al-Thaqafī al-Kūfī (Arabic: محمد بن مسلم الثقفي الكوفي) (768–699) was a Shia Muslim muhaddith, qadi and an ascetic (zāhed) who was highly regarded in the legal circles of Kufa. He was a prominent companion of fifth Shia Imam Muhammad al-Baqir (712–732) and his son and successor Ja'far al-Sadiq (732–765), and is considered one of the People of Consensus (Asḥāb al-ijmāʿ) by Shia Muslims. The scholars of rijal (biographical evaluation) regard him as the most learned jurist among Shia hadith transmitters. According to a hadith from Ja'far al-Sadiq, Muhammad b. Muslim was one of the revivers of the teachings of Muhammad al-Baqir.

== Early life ==
Muhammad was born in Kufa. He was a mawla of Banu Thaqif and his kunya was Abu Ja'far. In rijal sources, several epithets have been attributed to him, including al-Awqas, al-A'war, al-Haddaj, al-Qasir, al-Tahhan, al-Samman, al-Ta'ifi, and al-Thaqafi.

== Scholarly status ==
Muhammad studied under Muhammad al-Baqir in Medina for four years. According to a report, Jafar al-Sadiq counted Muhammad b. Muslim among the trustees of his father, al-Baqir, in matters of religion and as a protector of the Shia. Ja'far al-Sadiq would refer the people who were not able to stay in contact with him to Muhammad. According to a hadith, Imam Ja'far al-Sadiq said that "None of the Shia were more knowledgeable in fiqh than Muhammad."

It is reported that primary Sunni figures such as Abu Hanifa would refer to him in scholarly issues. He reportedly heard thirty-thousand hadiths from al-Baqir and sixteen thousand hadiths from Imam al-Sadiq.
