= Ja'far al-Sadiq =

Muslim scholar and Shia imam (c.702–765)

Ja'far al-Sadiq جَعْفَرٌ ٱلصَّادِقُ: ʿĀlim Āl Muḥammad; Shaykh al-Aʾimmah; al-Ṣādiq al-Amīn
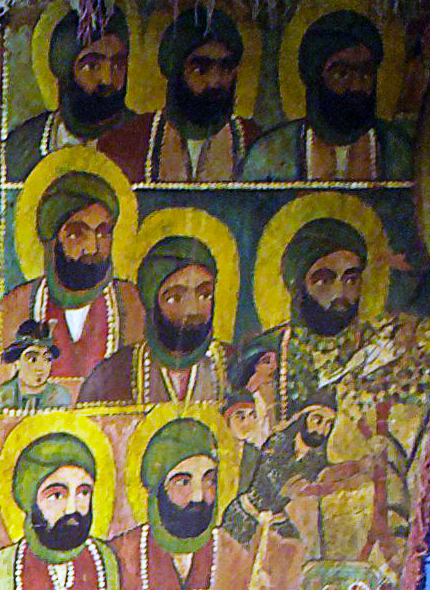
- Ja'far al-Sadiq (middle-right) depicted among other Shia Imams in a Qajar era artwork

6th Shia imam
- In office 732–765
- Preceded by: Muhammad al-Baqir
- Succeeded by: Musa al-Kazim (Twelverism); Isma'il al-Mubarak (Isma'ilism); Abd Allah al-Aftah (Aftahism)

Personal life
- Born: c. 702 (c. 83 AH) Medina, Hejaz, Umayyad Caliphate
- Died: 765 (aged 63–64) 148 AH Medina, Abbasid Caliphate
- Resting place: Al-Baqi, Medina, present-day Saudi Arabia; 24°28′1″N 39°36′50.21″E
- Spouse: Fāṭima bint al-Ḥusayn; Ḥamīda Khātūn
- Children: List: Mūsā al-Kāẓim; Ismāʿīl ibn Jaʿfar; ʿAbd Allāh al-Afṭaḥ; ʿAlī al-ʿUrayḍī; Muḥammad al-Dībāj; Isḥāq al-Muʾtamin
- Parents: Muḥammad ibn ʿAlī al-Bāqir; Umm Farwa
- Era: Late Umayyad – early Abbasid
- Other name: Jaʿfar ibn Muḥammad ibn ʿAlī

Religious life
- Religion: Islam
- Lineage: Ahl al-Bayt (Husaynid) Banu Hashim
- Sect: Shia

Muslim leader
- Students: Mālik ibn Anas
- Influenced: Abu Hanifa, Malik ibn Anas, Al-Shafi'i, Sufyan al-Thawri, Wasil ibn Ata, Zurarah ibn A'yan, Sayyida Nafisa, Shu'ba ibn al-Hajjaj

Ja'far ibn Muhammad al-Sadiq (Arabic: جعفر ابن محمد الصادق, romanized: Jaʿfar ibn Muḥammad al-Ṣādiq; c. 702–765) was a Muslim scholar, jurist, hadith transmitter and the sixth and last agreed-upon Shia Imam amongst Twelvers and Isma'ilis. Known by the title al-Sadiq ("The Truthful"), Ja'far was the eponymous founder of the Ja'fari school of Islamic jurisprudence. In the canonical Twelver hadith collections, more traditions are cited from Ja'far than that of the other Imams combined, although their attribution to him is questionable, making it hard to determine his actual teachings. Among the theological contributions ascribed to him are the doctrine of nass (divinely inspired designation of each Imam by the previous Imam) and isma (the infallibility of the Imams), as well as that of taqiya (religious dissimulation under persecution).

Al-Sadiq is also revered by Sunni Muslims as a reliable transmitter of hadith, and a transmitter to the Sunni scholars Abu Hanifa and Malik ibn Anas, the namesakes of the Hanafi and Maliki schools of jurisprudence. Al-Sadiq also figures prominently in the initiatic chains of many Sufi orders. A wide range of religious and scientific works were attributed to him, though no works penned by al-Sadiq remain extant.

Ja'far al-Sadiq was born around 700, perhaps in 702. He was about thirty-seven when his father, Muhammad al-Baqir, died after designating him as the next Imam. As the sixth Shia Imam, al-Sadiq kept aloof from the political conflicts that embroiled the region, evading the requests for support that he received from rebels. He was the victim of some harassment by the Abbasid caliphs and was eventually, according to Shia sources, poisoned at the instigation of the caliph al-Mansur. The question of succession after al-Sadiq's death divided the early Shi'a community. Some considered the next Imam to be his eldest son, Isma'il al-Mubarak, who had predeceased his father. Others accepted the Imamate of his younger son and brother of Isma'il, Musa al-Kazim. The first group became known as the Isma'ili, whereas the second and larger group was named Ja'fari or the Twelvers.

== Life ==
=== Birth and early life ===
Ja'far ibn Muḥammad ibn Ali al-Sadiq was born in Medina around 700, and 702 is given in most sources, according to Gleave. Ja'far was the eldest son of Muhammad al-Baqir, the fifth Shīʿīte Imam, who was a descendant of ʿAlī ibn Abī Ṭālib, Muhammad's cousin and son-in-law, and Fatima, Muhammad's daughter. Ja'far's mother, Umm Farwa, was a great-granddaughter of the first Rashidun caliph, Abu Bakr. During the first fourteen years of his life, Ja'far lived alongside his grandfather, Ali ibn Husayn Zayn al-Abidin, the fourth Shīʿīte Imam, and witnessed the latter's withdrawal from politics and his limited efforts amid the popular appeal of Muhammad ibn al-Hanafiyya. Ja'far also noted the respect that the famous scholars of Medina held toward Zayn al-Abidin. In his mother's house, Ja'far also interacted with his grandfather, Qasim ibn Muhammad ibn Abi Bakr, a famous traditionalist of his time. The Umayyad rule reached its peak in this period, and the childhood of al-Sadiq coincided with the growing interest of Medinans in religious sciences and the interpretations of the Quran. With the death of Zayn al-Abidin, Ja'far entered his early manhood and participated in his father's efforts as the representative of the Household of Muhammad (Ahl al-Bayt). Ja'far performed the hajj ritual with his father, al-Bāqir, and accompanied him when the latter was summoned to Damascus by the Umayyad caliph Hisham ibn Abd al-Malik for questioning.

=== Under the Umayyad rulers ===
Most Umayyad rulers are often described by Muslim historians as corrupt, irreligious, and treacherous. The widespread political and social dissatisfaction with the Umayyad Caliphate was spearheaded by Muhammad's extended family, who were seen by Muslims as God-inspired leaders in their religious struggle to establish justice over impiety. Al-Sadiq's imamate extended over the latter half of the Umayyad Caliphate, which was marked by many (often Shia) revolts and eventually witnessed the violent overthrow of the Umayyads by the Abbasids, the descendants of Muhammad's paternal uncle Abbas ibn Abd al-Muttalib. Al-Sadiq maintained his father's policy of quietism in this period and, in particular, was not involved in the uprising of his uncle, Zayd ibn Ali, who enjoyed the support of the Mu'tazilites and the traditionalists of Medina and Kufa. Al-Sadiq also played no role in the Abbasid overthrow of the Umayyads. His response to a request for help from Abu Muslim, the Khorasani rebel leader, was to burn his letter, saying, "This man is not one of my men, this time is not mine." At the same time, al-Sadiq did not advance his claims to the caliphate, even though he saw himself as the divinely designated leader of the Islamic community (umma). This spiritual, rather than political, imamate of al-Sadiq was accompanied by his teaching of the taqiya doctrine (religious dissimulation) to protect the Shia against prosecution by Sunni rulers. In this period, al-Sadiq taught quietly in Medina and developed his considerable reputation as a scholar, according to Momen.

=== Under the Abbasid rulers ===
The years of transition from the Umayyads to the Abbasids was a period of weak central authority, allowing al-Sadiq to teach freely. Some four thousand scholars are thus reported to have studied under al-Sadiq. Among these were Abu Ḥanifa and Malik ibn Anas, founders of the Hanafi and Maliki schools of law in Sunni Islam. Wasil ibn Ata, founder of the Mu'tazila school of thought, was also among his pupils. After their overthrow of the Umayyad Caliphate, the Abbasids violently prosecuted their former Shia allies against the Umayyads. Because they had relied on the public sympathy for the Ahl al-Bayt to attain power, the Abbasids considered al-Sadiq a potential threat to their rule. As the leader of the politically quiet branch of the Shia, he was summoned by al-Mansur to Baghdad but was reportedly able to convince the caliph to let him stay in Medina by quoting the hadith, "The man who goes away to make a living will achieve his purpose, but he who sticks to his family will prolong his life." Al-Sadiq remained passive in 762 to the failed uprising of his nephew, Muhammad al-Nafs al-Zakiyya. Nevertheless, he was arrested and interrogated by al-Mansur and held in Samarra, near Baghdad, before being allowed to return to Medina. His house was burned by order of al-Mansur, though he was unharmed, and there are reports of multiple arrests and attempts on his life by the caliph.

== Imamate ==
Ja'far al-Sadiq was about thirty-seven when his father, al-Bāqir, died after designating him as the next Shīʿīte Imam. He held the Imamate for at least twenty-eight years. His Imamate coincided with a crucial period in the history of Islam, as he witnessed both the overthrow of the Umayyad Caliphate by the Abbasids in the mid-8th century (661–750) and later the Abbasids' prosecution of their former Shia allies against the Umayyads. The leadership of the early Shia community was also disputed among its different factions. In this period, the various Alid uprisings against the Umayyads and later the Abbasids gained considerable support among the Shia. Among the leaders of these movements were Zayd ibn Ali (al-Sadiq's uncle), Yahya bin Zayd (al-Sadiq's cousin), Muhammad al-Nafs al-Zakiyya and his brother (al-Sadiq's nephews). These claimants saw the imamate and caliphate as inseparable for establishing the rule of justice, according to Jafri. In particular, Zayd ibn Ali argued that the imamate could belong to any descendant of Hasan ibn Ali or Husayn ibn Ali who is learned, pious, and revolts against the tyrants of his time. In contrast, similar to his father and his grandfather, al-Sadiq adopted a quiescent attitude and kept aloof from politics. He viewed the imamate and caliphate as separate institutions until such time that God would make the Imam victorious. This Imam, who must be a descendant of Muhammad through Ali and Fatima, derives his exclusive authority not from political claims but from nass (divinely inspired designation by the previous Imam) and he also inherits the special knowledge (ilm) which qualifies him for the position. Al-Sadiq did not originate this theory of imamate, which was already adopted by his predecessors, Zayn al-Abidin and al-Baqir. Rather, al-Sadiq leveraged the sudden climate of political instability to freely propagate and elaborate the Shia teachings, including the theory of imamate. (Note: Sunni sources, however, claim that doctrines such as imamate were formulated many years after al-Sadiq and wrongly ascribed to him.)

=== Succession ===
After the death of Ja'far al-Sadiq, his following fractured, and the largest group, who came to be known as the Twelvers, followed his younger son, Musa al-Kadhim. It also appears that many expected the next Imam to be al-Sadiq's eldest son, Isma'il ibn Ja'far, who predeceased his father. This group, which later formed the Isma'ili branch, either believed that Isma'il was still alive or instead accepted the imamate of Isma'il's son, Muhammad ibn Isma'il. While the Twelvers and the Isma'ilis are the only extant Jaf'ari Shia sects today, there were more factions at the time: Some followers of al-Sadiq accepted the imamate of his eldest surviving son, Abdullah al-Aftah. Several influential followers of al-Sadiq are recorded to have first followed Abdullah and then changed their allegiance to Musa. As Abdullah later died childless, the majority of his followers returned to Musa. A minority of al-Sadiq's followers joined his other son, Muhammad al-Dibaj, who led an unsuccessful uprising against Caliph al-Ma'mun, after which he abdicated and publicly confessed his error. A final group believed that al-Sadiq was not dead and would return as Mahdi, the promised savior in Islam.

== Death ==
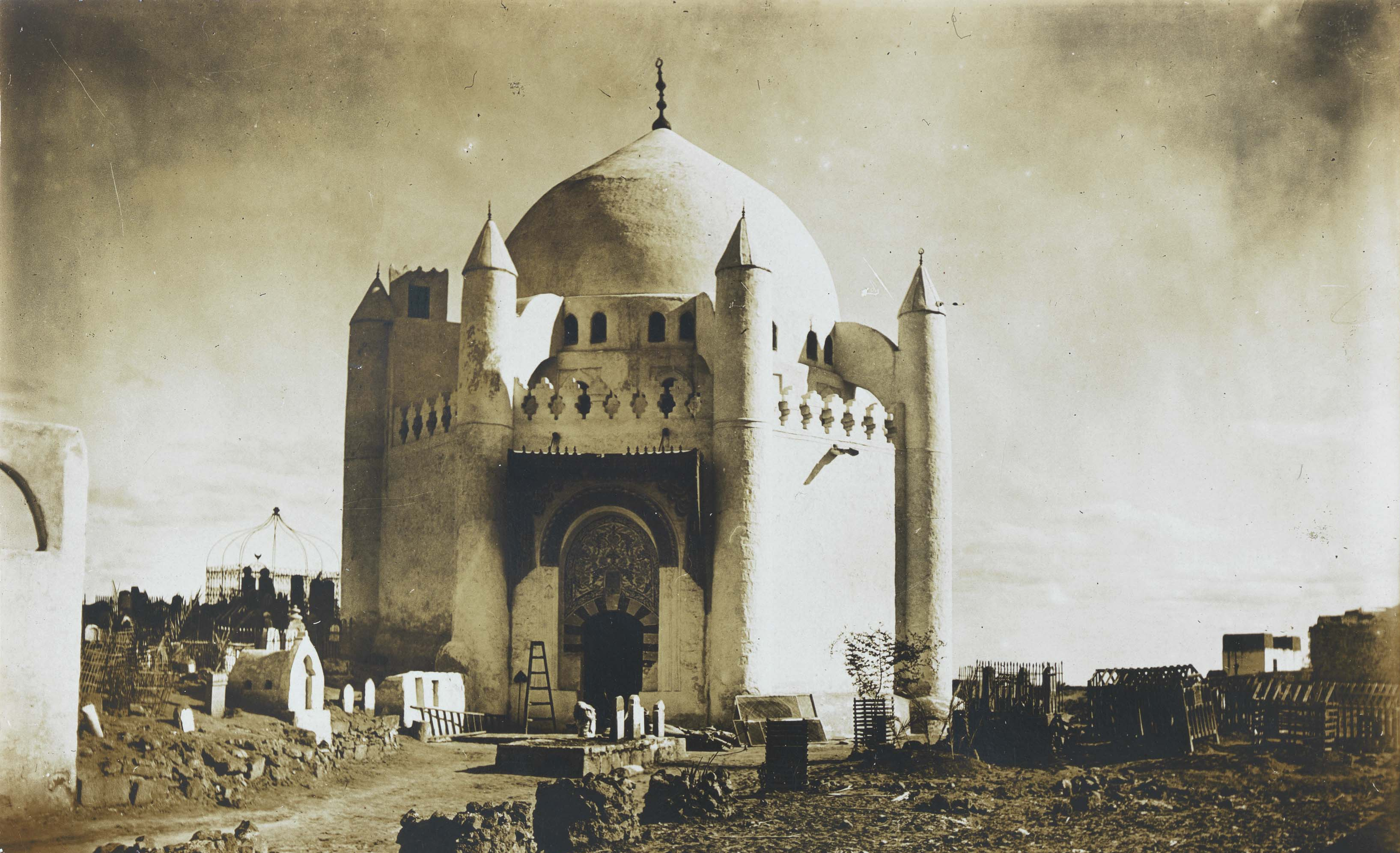
The historical tomb of al-Baqi was destroyed in 1926 during and by the Wahhabi movement in Saudi Arabia. Ja'far al-Sadiq is one of four Shia Imams buried there.

Al-Sadiq died in 765 (148 AH) at sixty-four or sixty-five. His death in Shia sources is attributed to poisoning at the instigation of al-Mansur. According to Muhammad Husayn Tabatabai, after being detained in Samarra, al-Sadiq was allowed to return to Medina, where he spent the rest of his life in hiding until he was poisoned by order of al-Mansur. Upon hearing the news of his death, al-Mansur ordered the governor of Medina to behead al-Sadiq's heir, the future Imam. The governor, however, learned that al-Sadiq had chosen four people, rather than one, to administer his will: al-Mansur himself, the governor, the Imam's oldest (surviving) son Abdullah al-Aftah, and Musa al-Kazim, his younger son. Al-Mansur's plot was thus thwarted.

Al-Sadiq was buried in the al-Baqi Cemetery in Medina, being one of the four Imams to be buried in the cemetery (the other Imams being Hasan Ibn Ali, Ali al-Sajjad and Muhammad al-Baqir). His tomb was a place of pilgrimage until Demolition of al-Baqi in 1926, when the Wahhabis, led by Ibn Saud, conquered Medina for the second time and razed all the tombs except that of the Islamic prophet.

== Family ==
Al-Sadiq married Fatima, a descendant of Hasan, with whom he had two sons, Isma'il ibn Ja'far (the sixth Isma'ili Imam) and Abdullah al-Aftah. He also married Hamida Khatun, a slave-girl from the Maghreb or Al-Andalus, who bore al-Sadiq three more sons: Musa al-Kazim (the seventh Twelver Imam), Muhammad al-Dibaj, and Ishaq al-Mu'tamin. She was known as Hamida the Pure and respected for her religious learning. Al-Sadiq often referred other women to learn the tenets of Islam from her. He is reported to have praised her, "Hamida is removed from every impurity like an ingot of pure gold." Ishaq al-Mu'tamin, is said to have married Sayyida Nafisa, a descendant of Hasan ibn Ali.

Ancestors of Ja'far al-Sadiq

8. Husayn ibn Ali
4. Ali ibn Husayn Zayn al-Abidin
9. Shahrbanu
2. Muhammad al-Baqir
10. Hasan ibn Ali
5. Fatima bint Hasan
11. Umm Ishaq bint Talha ibn Ubayd Allah
1. Ja'far al-Sadiq
12. Muhammad ibn Abi Bakr
6. Qasim ibn Muhammad ibn Abi Bakr
3. Umm Farwa
14. Abd al-Rahman ibn Abi Bakr
7. Asma bint Abd al-Rahman

== Contributions ==
After Ali, al-Sadiq is possibly the most famed religious scholar of the House of Muhammad, widely recognised as an authority in Islamic law, theology, hadith, and esoteric and occult sciences. Mohammad Ali Amir-Moezzi considers him possibly the most brilliant scholar of his time, and the variety of (at times contradictory) views ascribed to al-Sadiq suggest that he was an influential figure in the history of early Islamic thought, as nearly all the early intellectual factions of Islam (except perhaps the Kharijites) wished to incorporate al-Sadiq into their history in order to bolster their schools' positions. He is cited in a wide range of historical sources, including the works of al-Tabari, Ya'qubi, al-Masudi, and Ibn Khallikan. This popularity, however, has hampered the scholarly attempts to ascertain al-Sadiq's actual views. A number of religious and scientific works also bear al-Sadiq's name, though scholars generally regard them as inauthentic. It seems likely that he was a teacher who left writing to others. The most extensive contributions of al-Sadiq were to the Twelver Shia, helping establish them as a serious intellectual force in the late Umayyad and early Abbasid periods, according to Gleave. Muhammad Husayn Tabataba'i writes that the number of traditions left behind by al-Sadiq and his father, al-Baqir, were more than all the hadiths recorded from Muhammad and the other Shia Imams combined. Shia thought has continued to develop based on the teachings of the Shia Imams, including al-Sadiq. According to Sa'id Akhtar Rizvi, quoting the work of Syed Ameer Ali, al-Sadiq preached against slavery.

=== Doctrine of imamate ===
Following his predecessors, Zayn al-Abidin and al-Baqir, al-Sadiq further elaborated the Shia doctrine of imamate, which has become the hallmark of the Twelver and Isma'ili Shia theologies, but rejected by the Zaydis. In this doctrine, Imam is a descendant of Muhammad through Ali and Fatima who derives his exclusive authority not from political claims but from nass, that is, divinely-inspired designation by the previous Imam. As the successor of Muhammad, the Imam has an all-inclusive mandate for temporal and religious leadership of the Islamic community, though this doctrine views the imamate and caliphate as separate institutions until such time that God would make the Imam victorious. The Imam also inherits from his predecessor the special knowledge (ilm), which qualifies him for the position. Similar to Muhammad, Imam is believed to be infallible thanks to this unique knowledge, which also establishes him as the sole authorised source for interpreting the revelation and guiding the Muslims along the right path. This line of Imams in Shia Islam is traced back to Ali, who succeeded Muhammad through a divine decree.

=== Ja'fari school of law ===
Law in Islam is an all-embracing body of ordinances that govern worship and ritual in addition to a proper legal system. Building on the work of his father, al-Sadiq is remembered as the eponymous founder of the Ja'fari school of law (al-Madhab al-Ja'fari), followed by the Twelver Shia. According to Lalani, the Isma'ili jurisprudence (fiqh), as codified by Al-Qadi al-Nu'man, is also primarily based on the large corpus of statements left behind by al-Sadiq and his father, al-Baqir. Al-Sadiq denounced the contemporary use of opinion (ray), personal juristic reasoning (ejtehad), and analogical reasoning (qias) as human attempts to impose regularity and predictability onto the laws of God. He argued that God's law is occasional and unpredictable and that Muslims should submit to the inscrutable will of God as revealed by the Imam. He also embraced a devolved system of legal authority: it is ascribed to al-Sadiq that, "It is for us [the Imams] to set out foundational rules and principles (usul), and it is for you [the learned] to derive the specific legal rulings for actual cases." Similarly, when asked how legal disputes within the community should be solved, al-Sadiq described the state apparatus as evil (tagut) and encouraged the Shia to refer to "those who relate our [i.e., the Imams'] hadiths" because the Imams have "made such a one a judge (hakam) over you." The Sunni jurisprudence is based on the three pillars of the Quran, the practices of Muhammad (sunna), and consensus (ijma'), whereas the Twelver Shia jurisprudence adds to these pillars a fourth pillar of reasoning (aql) during the occultation of Mahdi. In Shia Islam, sunna also includes the practices of the Shia Imams.

=== Doctrine of taqiya ===
Taqiya is a form of religious dissimulation, where an individual can hide one's beliefs under persecution. Taqiya was introduced by al-Baqir and later advocated by al-Sadiq to protect his followers from prosecution at the time when al-Mansur, the Abbasid caliph, conducted a brutal campaign against the Alids and their supporters. This doctrine is based on verse 16:106 of the Quran, where the wrath of God is said to await the apostate "except those who are compelled while their hearts are firm in faith." According to Amir-Moezzi, in the early sources, taqiya means "the keeping or safeguarding of the secrets of the Imams' teaching," which may have resulted at times in contradictory traditions from the Imams. In such cases, if one of the contradictory reports matches the corresponding Sunni doctrine, it would be discarded because the Imam must have had agreed with Sunnis to avoid prosecution of himself or his community. Karen Armstrong suggests that taqiya also kept conflict to a minimum with those religious scholars (ulama) who disagreed with the Shia teachings.

=== Free will ===
On the question of predestination and free will, which was under much discussion at the time, al-Sadiq followed his father, portraying human responsibility but preserving God's autocracy, asserting that God decreed some things absolutely but left others to human agency. This compromise, widely adopted afterward, is highlighted when al-Sadiq was asked if God forces His servants to do evil or whether He had delegated power to them: he answered negatively to both questions and instead suggested, "The blessings of your Lord are between these two." Al-Sadiq taught "that God the Most High decreed some things for us and He has likewise decreed some things through our agency: what He has decreed for us or on our behalf He has concealed from us, but what He has decreed through our agency He has revealed to us. We are not concerned, therefore, so much with what He has decreed for us as we are with what He has decreed through our agency." Al-Sadiq is also credited with the statement that God does not "order created beings to do something without providing for them a means of not doing it, though they do not do it or not do it without God's permission." Al-Sadiq declared, "Whoever claims that God has ordered evil, has lied about God. Whoever claims that both good and evil are attributed to him, has lied about God." In his prayers, he often said, "There is no work of merit on my own behalf or on behalf of another, and in evil there is no excuse for me or for another."

=== Quranic exegesis ===
Al-Sadiq is attributed with what is regarded as the most important principle for judging traditions, that a hadith should be rejected if it contradicts the Quran, whatever other evidence might support it. In his books Haqaeq al-Tafsir and Ziadat Ḥaqaeq al-Tafsir, the author Abd-al-Raḥman Solami cites al-Ṣadiq as one of his major (if not the major) sources. It is said that al-Sadiq merged the inner and the outer meanings of the Quran to reach a new interpretation of it (ta'wil). It is ascribed to al-Sadiq that, "The Book of God [Quran] comprises four things: the statement set down (ibarah), the implied purport (isharah), the hidden meanings, relating to the supra-sensible world (lata'ij), and the exalted spiritual doctrines (haqaiq). The literal statement is for the ordinary believers (awamm). The implied purport is the concern of the elite (khawass). The hidden meanings pertain to the Friends of God (awliya'). The exalted spiritual doctrines are the province of the prophets (anbiya')". These remarks echo the statement of Ali, the first Shia Imam.

== Views ==
Ja'far al-Sadiq's significance in the formation of early Muslim thought is demonstrated by the fact that his name is used as a reference in Sufi, scientific, Sunni legal, Ismaili, and ghulāt circles. Most of these groups desired to use his legacy for their own agendas. However, the Imami Shia tradition is the most comprehensive source for his teachings.

=== Shia Islam ===
While the Sunnis respect al-Sadiq as a transmitter of hadith and a jurist (Faqīh), Shias view him as an Imam and therefore infallible and record his sayings and actions in the works of hadith and jurisprudence (Fiqh). In the Shia writings of the Imamiyya, his legal rulings constitute the most important source of Imamiyya law. In fact, the Imam's legal doctrine is called Ja'fari jurisprudence (Madhhab Ja'fari) by both the Imamis and the Sunnis in order to refer to his legal authority. The Shias considered al-Sadiq the only legitimate person who could represent the Sharia in his time and have the authority to rule. According to Imami Shi'as, Ja'far al-Sadiq, is the sixth imam who was responsible for turning the imamiya into a powerful intellectual movement during the late Umayyad and early Abbasid eras. Al-Sadiq is presented by Ya'qubi as one of the most respected personalities of his epoch, adding that it was customary to refer to al-Sadiq as "the learned one".

=== Sunni Islam ===
Early Islamic scholars

Muhammad, The final Messenger of God (570–632) the Constitution of Medina, taught the Quran, and advised his companions
Abdullah ibn Masud (died 653) taught	Ali (607–661) fourth caliph taught	Aisha, Muhammad's wife and Abu Bakr's daughter taught	Abd Allah ibn Abbas (618–687) taught	Zayd ibn Thabit (610–660) taught	Umar (579–644) second caliph taught	Abu Hurairah (603–681) taught
Alqama ibn Qays (died 681) taught	Husayn ibn Ali (626–680) taught	Qasim ibn Muhammad ibn Abi Bakr (657–725) taught and raised by Aisha	Urwah ibn Zubayr (died 713) taught by Aisha, he then taught	Said ibn al-Musayyib (637–715) taught	Abdullah ibn Umar (614–693) taught	Abd Allah ibn al-Zubayr (624–692) taught by Aisha, he then taught
Ibrahim al-Nakha’i taught	Ali ibn Husayn Zayn al-Abidin (659–712) taught	Hisham ibn Urwah (667–772) taught	Ibn Shihab al-Zuhri (died 741) taught	Salim ibn Abd-Allah ibn Umar taught	Umar ibn Abdul Aziz (682–720) raised and taught by Abdullah ibn Umar
Hammad ibn Abi Sulayman taught	Muhammad al-Baqir (676–733) taught	Farwah bint al-Qasim Jafar's mother
Abu Hanifa (699–767) wrote Al Fiqh Al Akbar and Kitab Al-Athar, jurisprudence followed by Sunni, Sunni Sufi, Barelvi, Deobandi, Zaidiyyah and originally by the Fatimid and taught	Zayd ibn Ali (695–740)	Ja'far bin Muhammad Al-Baqir (702–765) Muhammad and Ali's great great grand son, jurisprudence followed by Shia, he taught	Malik ibn Anas (711–795) wrote Muwatta, jurisprudence from early Medina period now mostly followed by Maliki Sunnis in North Africa, and taught	Al-Waqidi (748–822) wrote history books like Kitab al-Tarikh wa al-Maghazi, student of Malik ibn Anas	Abu Muhammad Abdullah ibn Abdul Hakam (died 829) wrote biographies and history books, student of Malik ibn Anas
Abu Yusuf (729–798) wrote Usul al-fiqh	Muhammad al-Shaybani (749–805)	al-Shafi‘i (767–820) wrote Al-Risala, jurisprudence followed by Shafi'i Sunnis and Sufis, and taught	Ismail ibn Ibrahim	Ali ibn al-Madini (778–849) wrote The Book of Knowledge of the Companions	Ibn Hisham (died 833) wrote early history and As-Sirah an-Nabawiyyah, Muhammad's biography
Isma'il ibn Ja'far (719–775)	Musa al-Kadhim (745–799)	Ahmad ibn Hanbal (780–855) wrote Musnad Ahmad ibn Hanbal jurisprudence followed by Hanbali Sunnis and Sufis	Muhammad al-Bukhari (810–870) wrote Sahih al-Bukhari hadith books	Muslim ibn al-Hajjaj (815–875) wrote Sahih Muslim hadith books	Dawud al-Zahiri (815–883/4) founded the Zahiri school	Muhammad ibn Isa at-Tirmidhi (824–892) wrote Jami` at-Tirmidhi hadith books	Al-Baladhuri (died 892) wrote early history Futuh al-Buldan, Genealogies of the Nobles
Ibn Majah (824–887) wrote Sunan ibn Majah hadith book	Abu Dawood (817–889) wrote Sunan Abu Dawood Hadith Book
Muhammad ibn Ya'qub al-Kulayni (864- 941) wrote Kitab al-Kafi hadith book followed by Twelver Shia	Muhammad ibn Jarir al-Tabari (838–923) wrote History of the Prophets and Kings, Tafsir al-Tabari	Abu al-Hasan al-Ash'ari (874–936) wrote Maqālāt al-islāmīyīn, Kitāb al-luma, Kitāb al-ibāna 'an usūl al-diyāna
Ibn Babawayh (923–991) wrote Man La Yahduruhu al-Faqih jurisprudence followed by Twelver Shia	Sharif Razi (930–977) wrote Nahj al-Balagha followed by Twelver Shia	Nasir al-Din al-Tusi (1201–1274) wrote jurisprudence books followed by Ismaili and Twelver Shia	Al-Ghazali (1058–1111) wrote The Niche for Lights, The Incoherence of the Philosophers, The Alchemy of Happiness on Sufism	Rumi (1207–1273) wrote Masnavi, Diwan-e Shams-e Tabrizi on Sufism
Key: Some of Muhammad's Companions	Key: Taught in Medina	Key: Taught in Iraq	Key: Worked in Syria	Key: Travelled extensively collecting the sayings of Muhammad and compiled books of hadith	Key: Worked in Persia

Al-Sadiq is respected in Sunni Islam as a jurist and a master teacher of hadith sciences, who is cited in several isnads (chains of transmissions). He was one of the Shiekhs (masters) of Imam Malik ibn Anas and he has narrated several narrations in Muwatta Imam Malik. He was also a teacher to Imam Sufyan al-Thawri. According to Jafri, the famous Sunni jurist Malik ibn Anas would quote al-Sadiq as "The truthful (thiqa) Ja'far ibn Muhammad himself told me that..." (A similar attitude is reported from Abu Hanifa.). The Sunni scholar al-Dhahabi recognises al-Sadiq's contribution to Sunni tradition, and al-Shahrastani, the influential Sunni historian, pays al-Sadiq a high tribute in his work. There are also many Sunni traditions in which al-Sadiq and other descendants of Ali ibn Abi Talib deny any Shia affiliation. Sunnis also point to several Shia narrations in which al-Sadiq denies any affiliation with Shias and denies claiming to be the Imam. The Hadith Scholar Yahya ibn Ma'in said "If reliable transmitters transmit hadith from Ja'far Al-Sadiq, then his [Ja'far's] hadith is steadfast; but if the likes of Ma'tab and Hammad b. Isa transmit from him, then it is worthless".

=== Sufism ===
Al-Sadiq holds a special prominence among Sufi orders: a number of early Sufi figures are associated with al-Sadiq; he is praised in the Sufi literature for his knowledge of ṭariqat (lit. 'path'), and numerous sayings and writings about spiritual progress are ascribed to him in Sufi circles. He is also viewed at the head of the Sufi line of saints and mystics by the Sufi writers Abu Nu'aym al-Isfahani and Attar of Nishapur. Attar praises al-Sadiq as the one "who spoke more than the other imams concerning the ṭariqat", who "excelled in writing on innermost mysteries and truths and who was matchless in expounding the subtleties and secrets of revelation." However, some of the material attributed to al-Sadiq in the Sufi literature is said to be apocryphal. Among others, the Shia Ahmad ibn Muhammad Ardabili has thus dismissed the alleged links between al-Sadiq and Sufism as an attempt to gain the authority of al-Sadiq for Sufi teachings. Gleave and Bowering suggest that Tafsir al-Quran, Manafe' Sowar al-Quran and Kawass al-Qoran al-Azam, three mystical commentaries of the Quran attributed to al-Sadiq, were composed after his death because these works demonstrate a mastery of the recent lexicon of Muslim mysticism. Alternatively, Taylor is certain that the traditions in the Quranic exegesis edited by the mystic Dhu al-Nun Misri can be traced back to the Imam. Given the appeal and influence of al-Sadiq outside the circle of his Shia supporters, Algar suggests that he likely played some role in the formation of Sufism. Both Abu Nu'aym and Attar narrate several encounters between al-Sadiq and contemporary proto-Sufis to highlight his asceticism (zuhd). One encounter describes how Sofyan Ṯawri, the jurist and ascetic, allowed himself to reproach the Imam for his silken robe, only for the Imam to reveal beneath it a modest white woolen cloak, explaining that the finery was for men to behold and the woolen cloak for God. The Imam thus displayed the former and concealed the latter.

=== Ghulat ===
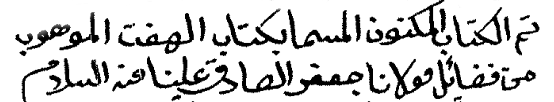
Two lines from the end of the ghulāt work Kitab al-Haft wa-l-azilla ("Book of the Seven and the Shadows"). Manuscript of unknown provenance. "Thus is finished the concealed book called the Book of the Seven, which was a gift of grace from our lord Ja'far al-Sadiq, peace be upon us from him,"

One of the distinctive features of the ghulāt is the imam's deification. One group of them called the Mufawidda, preached that God gave Muhammad and the imams the authority to create and take care of all living things. Many Twelver Shi'i traditions state that al-Baqir and al-Sadiq did not have supernatural abilities and did not perform the miracles attributed to them. Despite these denials, a number of hadiths that contained ghulāt concepts found their way into Twelver Shia hadith collections.

According to some early Imami heresiographers, Abu al-Khattab (died 755) asserted that he had been chosen to serve as al-Sadiq's envoy and had been given access to his hidden doctrines. It seems that Abu al-Khattab's views on al-Sadiq's divinity and his own status as a prophetic messenger of God eventually led al-Sadiq to repudiate him in 748. His adherents were referred to as Khattabiyya. Later Twelver tradition disavows any connection between al-Sadiq and the views of Abu al-Khattab.

The same Imami heresiographers also claim that al-Mufaddal ibn Umar al-Ju'fi (died before 799) and his followers, the Mufaddaliya, likewise regarded al-Sadiq as a god and themselves as his prophets. However, it is not certain whether the Mufaddaliya ever existed, and in Twelver hadith al-Mufaddal consistently appears as the intimate companion of Ja'far al-Sadiq and his son Musa al-Kazim, with the exception of the brief period of disgrace with Jaʿfar al-Sadiq due to his Khattabiyya leanings. According to Twelver traditions, al-Mufaddal was even appointed by al-Sadiq to control the excesses of Khattabiyya. Nevertheless, al-Mufaddal's status as a close confidant of Ja'far al-Sadiq led to a large number of writings being attributed to him by later authors, including major ghulāt works such as the Kitab al-Haft wa-l-Azilla ("Book of the Seven and the Shadows") and the Kitab al-Sirat ("Book of the Path").

=== Yarsanism ===
In Yarsanism, Ja'far al-Sadiq is regarded as an incarnation of one of the angels belonging to the group known as the "Haft Sardār" (The Seven Commanders).

According to the Yaresan text Doureh-ye Bahlul, the Yaresan saint Bahlul Mahi visited Ja'far al-Sadiq in Baghdad and studied under him.

== Works ==
A large number of religious books bear al-Sadiq's name as their author, but none of them can be attributed to al-Sadiq with certainty. It has been suggested that al-Sadiq was a writer who left the work of writing to his students. In this regard, some of the works attributed to Jabir ibn Hayyan (c. 850 – c. 950) also claim to be mere expositions of al-Sadiq's teachings.

A Quran commentary (tafsir), a book on divination (Ketb al-Jafr), numerous drafts of his will, and several collections of legal dicta are among the works attributed to al-Sadiq.

=== Exegesis ===
Most of the extant writings attributed to al-Sadiq are commentaries (tafsir) on the Quran: in Sufi circles, a number of mystical Quranic exegeses are attributed to al-Sadiq, such as Tafsir al-Quran, Manafe' Sowar al-Quran, and Kawass al-Quran al-Azam.

Another attributed work is the book of Jafr, a mystical commentary which according to Ibn Khaldun was written by al-Sadiq about the hidden (batin) meanings of the Quran. According to Ibn Khaldun this book was transmitted from al-Sadiq and written down by Hārūn ibn Saʿīd al-ʿIjlī.

Perhaps the most influential mystical exegesis attributed to al-Sadiq is the Ḥaqāʾiq al-tafsīr, composed by Abū ʿAbd al-Raḥmān al-Sulamī (d. 330/942). This text was first introduced to modern scholarship by Louis Massignon, and was later published in a critical edition by Paul Nwyia. (Note: see "Le Tafsir mystique attribué à Ğaʿfar Ṣādiq - Édition critique" (Nwiya, Le Tafsir mystique, 179-230)) Another version was published by ʿAlī Zayʿūr. (Note: He published a corrected version under the title alTafsīr al-Ṣūfī lil-Qurʾān ʿinda l-Ṣādiq) One of the outstanding features of this exegesis is its emphasis on letter mysticism. It is considered to be the oldest mystical commentary of the Quran after Sahl al-Tustari's exegesis.

Tafsīr al-Nuʿmānī is another exegesis attributed to al-Sadiq, which he supposedly narrated on the authority of Ali from Muhammad. This treatise was compiled by Muhammad ibn Ibrahim al-Nu'mani – known as Ibn Abi Zainab. The 17th-century scholar Mohammad-Baqer Majlesi recorded it in his Bihar al-Anwar. A summary of it has also been attributed to the Twelver theologian Sharif al-Murtaza and was published under the title Risālat al-Muḥkam wa-l-Mutashābih.

Tafsīr al-Imām al-Ṣādiq is another commentary attributed to al-Sadiq, which Agha Bozorg Tehrani mentions it in his book al-Dharī'a under the title Tafsir al-Imam Ja'far bin Muhammad al-Sadiq and it is believed that one of Sadiq's students narrated it from him. Fuat Sezgin calls this work Tafsīr al-Qurʾān. A copy of it with the title Tafsīr al-Imām al-Ṣādiq, according to Bankipur Oriental Library's catalogue, is written by al-Nuʿmānī based on the sayings of al-Sadiq. This commentary is arranged according to the Surahs of the Quran and covers only the words of the Quran that require explanation. This commentary, which is a type of mystical commentary, deals with both the exoteric (ẓāhir) and the esoteric (bāṭin) aspects of the Quran. It is mostly about God and his relationship with mankind, also man's knowledge of God and the relationship between Muhammad and God.

=== Tawhid al-Mufaddal ===
The Tawḥīd al-Mufaḍḍal ('Declaration by al-Mufaddal of the Oneness of God'), also known as the Kitāb fī Badʾ al-Khalq wa-l-Hathth ʿalā al-Iʿtibār ("Book on the Beginning of Creation and the Incitement to Contemplation"), is a ninth-century treatise concerned with proving the existence of God, attributed to Ja'far al-Sadiq's financial agent al-Mufaddal ibn Umar al-Ju'fi (died before 799). The work presents itself as a dialogue between al-Mufaddal and Ja'far al-Sadiq, who is the main speaker.

Like most other works attributed to al-Mufaddal, the Tawḥīd al-Mufaḍḍal was in fact written by a later, anonymous author who took advantage of al-Mufaddal's status as one of the closest confidants of Ja'far al-Sadiq in order to ascribe their own ideas to the illustrious Imam. However, it differs from other treatises attributed to al-Mufaddal by the absence of any content that is specifically Shi'i in nature, a trait it shares with only one other Mufaddal work — also dealing with a rational proof for the existence of God — the Kitāb al-Ihlīlaja ("Book of the Myrobalan Fruit"). Though both preserved by the 17th-century Shi'i scholar Muhammad Baqir al-Majlisi (died 1699), the only thing that connects the Tawḥīd al-Mufaḍḍal and the Kitāb al-Ihlīlaja to Shi'ism more generally is their ascription to Ja'far al-Sadiq and al-Mufaddal. Rather than by Shi'i doctrine, their content appears to be influenced by Mu'tazilism, a rationalistic school of Islamic speculative theology (kalām).

The Tawḥīd al-Mufaḍḍal is in fact a revised version of a work falsely attributed to the famous Mu'tazili litterateur al-Jahiz (died 868) under the title Kitāb al-Dalāʾil wa-l-Iʿtibār ʿalā al-Khalq wa-l-Tadbīr ("Book of Proofs and Contemplation on Creation and Administration"). Both the Tawḥīd al-Mufaḍḍal and pseudo-Jahiz's Kitāb al-Dalāʾil likely go back on an earlier 9th-century text, which has sometimes been identified as the Kitāb al-Fikr wa-l-Iʿtibār ("Book of Thought and Contemplation") written by the 9th-century Nestorian Christian Jibril ibn Nuh ibn Abi Nuh al-Nasrani al-Anbari.

The teleological argument for the existence of God used in the Tawḥīd al-Mufaḍḍal is inspired by Syriac Christian literature (especially commentaries on the Hexameron), and ultimately goes back on Hellenistic models such as the pseudo-Aristotelian De mundo ("On the Universe", 3rd/2nd century BCE) and Stoic theology as recorded in Cicero's (106–43 BCE) De natura deorum.

=== Other works ===
Misbah al-Sharia and Miftah al-Haqiqah is another work attributed to al-Sadiq. It is on personal conduct, with chapters on various topics such as legal interests interspersed with general moral issues, and advice on how to lead a spiritual life and thus purify the soul.

As the first person who came across this book in the 7th century A.H., Sayyed Ibn Tawus described it as a collection of hadiths of Jafar al-Sadiq. It includes a prediction of future events and sufferings. There is a specific Shia chapter in "Knowledge of the Imams" in which the names of all the Imams (both before al-Sadiq and after him) are mentioned during the exchange of reports between Muhammad and Salman the Persian. Mohammad Baqer Majlesi considered this work to have been written by Shaqiq al-Balkhi, who supposedly quoted it from "one of the people of knowledge", and not explicitly from Ja'far al-Sadiq. Despite Majlesi's doubts about its authenticity, this work remains very popular as a manual of personal worship and has been the subject of a number of commentaries by prominent Shia and Sufi scholars. It has also been translated into different languages. Its manuscript is available in the library of Gotha.

There is also a book on dream interpretation that is attributed to al-Sadiq and is known by the name Taqsim al-roʾyā. It is identical to the work Ketāb al-taqsim fi taʿbir al-ḥolm, which is credited to Ja'far al-Sadiq. Eighty various types of dream sightings, ranging from the religious (dreams of God, angels, prophets, and imams) to the profane (dreams of meat, fat, and cheese), are interpreted by Ja'far al-Sadiq in this book. According to Robert Gleave, it is not always clear whether they can be regarded as works attributed to Jafar al-Sadiq or works attributed to Ali ibn Abi Talib that is transmitted through Ja'far al-Sadiq. From a Shia perspective, this is not problematic because there is no discernible difference between the knowledge of one imam and that of another from a religious perspective.

The Kitāb al-Ihlīlaja is presented as al-Sadiq's opinions transmitted through al-Mufaddal. The work is allegedly a response to al-Mufaddal's request for a refutation of atheists.

Jafar al-Sadiq describes his own argument with an atheist Indian doctor in it. The discussion took place as the doctor prepared a myrobalan plant-based medication (known in Arabic as Ihlīlaj, and hence the title of the work).

== Shia disciples ==
Momen contends that of the few thousand students who are said to have studied under al-Sadiq, only a few could have been Shia, considering that al-Sadiq did not openly advance his claims to the imamate. Notable Shia students of al-Sadiq reportedly included:

- Hisham ibn al-Hakam was a famous disciple of al-Sadiq, who proposed a number of doctrines that later became orthodox in the Twelver theology, including the rational necessity of the divinely-guided imam in every age to teach and lead God's community.
- Aban ibn Taghlib was an outstanding jurist and traditionist and an associate of al-Sadiq in Kufa, but also of Zayn al-Abidin and al-Baqir. The latter is reported to have praised Aban, "Sit in the mosque of Kufa and give legal judgment to the people. Indeed I would like to see among my Shia people like you".
- Burayd ibn Mu'awiya al-'Ijli in Kufa was a famous disciple of al-Baqir and later al-Sadiq, who later became a key authority in the Shia jurisprudence (fiqh). Al-Baqir praised him (along with Abu Basir Moradi, Muhammad bin Muslim, and Zurarah) as worthy of the paradise.
- Abu Basir al-Asadi was considered one of the poles of the intellectual leadership of the Imami community of Kufa. His name is included in the number of six companions of al-Baqir and al-Sadiq that hadiths narrated by any one of them is considered authentic by many Shi'a scholars. Some consider Abu Basir al-Moradi as one of those six people instead of Abu Basir al-Asadi.
- Abu Basir Moradi, a famous Shia jurist (faqih) and traditionist, was another associate of al-Baqir and al-Sadiq. Al-Sadiq is believed to have told Moradi, Zurarah, Burayd, and Muhammad ibn Muslim that the prophetic hadiths would have been lost without them.
- Abu Ja'far Muhammad ibn Ali ibn Nu'man known as Mu'min al-Taq was a distinguished theologist in Kufa and a devoted follower of al-Baqir and al-Sadiq, whose debates about imamate are famous. Kitab al-Imamah and Kitab al-Radd alla al-Muazila fi Imamat al-Mafdul are among his works.
- Zurarah ibn A'yan in Kufa was a disciple of al-Hakam ibn Utayba before joining al-Baqir. As a prominent traditionist and theologian, Zurarah played an important role in developing the Shia thought. Zurarah lived long enough to also become a close disciple of Ja'far al-Sadiq.
- Fudayl ibn Yasar is another notable associate of both al-Baqir and al-Sadiq, about whom al-Sadiq said what Muhammad had said about Salman the Persian, that "Fudayl is from us, the Ahl al-Bayt."
- Maymun ibn al-Aswad al-Qaddah was a devout supporter of al-Baqir and his son, al-Sadiq. Not educated but with an impressive personality, Maymun probably committed to writing what he heard from the Imams. His son, Abd Allah, is the alleged ancestor of the Isma'ili imams.

== Selected quotes ==
- "The most perfect of men in intellect is the best of them in ethics."
- "Charity is the zakat (alms) of blessings, intercession is the zakat of dignity, illnesses are the zakat of bodies, forgiveness is the zakat of victory, and the thing whose zakat is paid is safe from taking (by God)."
- "He who answers all that he is asked, surely is mad."
- "Whoever fears God, God makes all things fear him; and whoever does not fear God, God makes him fear all things."
- "God Almighty has said: people are dear to me as family. Therefore, the best of them is the one who is nicer to others and does his best to resolve their needs."
- "One of the deeds God Almighty appreciates the most is making his pious servants happy. This can be done through fulfilling their hunger, sweeping away their sorrows, or paying off their debts."

== See also ==
- Family tree of Muhammad
- Imamate (Shia doctrine)
- Imamate (Twelver doctrine)

== Notes ==
Ja'far al-Sadiq of the Ahl al-Bayt Banu Hashim Clan of the Quraysh Born: c. 83 AH (c. 702 CE) Died: 148 AH (765 CE)
Shia Islam titles
Preceded by Muhammad al-Baqir	6th Imam of Shia Islam; 732–765	Succeeded by Musa al-Kazim; Twelver successor
Preceded by Muhammad al-Baqir	6th Imam of Shia Islam; 732–765	Succeeded by Isma'il al-Mubarak; Isma'ili successor
Preceded by Muhammad al-Baqir	6th Imam of Shia Islam; 732–765	Succeeded by Abdullah al-Aftah; Fathite successor
