= Ahmad ibn Ali al-Najashi =

11th-century Twelver Shi'ite scholar

- أحمد بن علي النجاشي
- Title: Ibn al-Kufi

Personal life
- Born: 372 AH / 982 CE Baghdad
- Died: 1058 or 1071 CE Samarra
- Era: Islamic golden age
- Notable work: Rijal al-Najashi

Religious life
- Religion: Islam
- Denomination: Shia
- Jurisprudence: Ja'fari
- Creed: Twelver

Muslim leader
- Teacher: Shaykh al-Mufid, Sharif al-Murtaza, Sharif al-Radi, Ibn al-Ghada'iri

Abū al-ʿAbbās Aḥmad ibn ʿAlī ibn al-ʿAbbas ibn Muḥammad ibn ʿAbdullāh al-Najāshī al-Asadī (Arabic: أحمد بن علي بن أحمد بن العباس بن محمد بن عبد الله النجاشي الأسدي; c. 982–1058), often simply referred to as al-Najāshī, was a Twelver Shi'ite Muslim scholar mainly known for his work on the subject of biographical evaluation (ʿilm al-rijāl, Islamic science dealing with the reliability of hadith transmitters), called the Rijāl al-Najāshī. His family is descended from Abu Samal ibn Hubayra al-Asadi (d. 60 AH / 679 CE), a poet of the Ridda Wars who repented and fought in the Battle of al-Qadisiyyah in 636, during the Muslim conquest of Persia. His ancestor was Abdullah al-Najashi, the wāli of al-Ahwaz at the time of Abu Ja'far al-Mansur (754–775), who was an "adamant Rāfiḍi" according to Basran historian Abu al-Yakzan (d. 805). Abdullah is also known for his correspondence of inquiry with Ja'far al-Sadiq. His son, Muhammad ibn Abdullah, was also the governor of Istakhr in Iran.

== See also ==
- Muhammad ibn Umar al-Kashshi, and his Rijāl al-Kashshī
