= List of Shia books =

A list of religious books of Shia Islam:

== Books attributed to Shia Imams ==
1. Mus'haf of Ali, a Tafseer of the Quran by Imam Ali
2. Al-Jafr by Imam Ali
3. Nahj al-Balaghah, a collection of sermons, letters and quotes attributed to Ali
4. Ghurar al-Hikam wa Durar al-Kalim compilation of over ten thousand short sayings of Imam Ali
5. Al-Sahifa al-Alawiya (Book of Supplications (Du'a)) by Imam Ali, translated by William Chittick.
6. Book of Ali by Ali
7. Book of Fatimah by Fatimah
8. Al-Sahifa al-Sajjadiyya by Imam Zayn al-Abidin
9. Risalatul Huquq by Zayn al-Abidin
10. The Fifteen Whispered Prayers by Zayn al-Abidin
11. Dua Abu Hamza al-Thumali by Zayn al-Abidin
12. Ma'athiru'l-Baqir by Imam Muhammad al-Baqir
13. Umm al-Kitab by Imam Muhammad al-Baqir
14. Tafsir al-Baqir by Imam Muhammad al-Baqir
15. Tafsir Imam Ja'far al-Sadiq by Imam Jafar al-Sadiq
16. Al-Sahifat al-Ridha by Imam Ali al-Ridha
17. Al-Risalah al-Dhahabiah by Imam Ali al-Ridha
18. Tafsir al-Askari by Imam Hasan al-Askari

== Quranic Tafsirs ==
List of Quran Exegesis books and related Concepts:
1. Tafsir Al-Qummi attributed to Mohammad bin Ali bin Ibrahim Al-Qummi (?? - 919 AD)
2. Tafsir Ayyashi by Mohammad ibn Masoud Ayyashi (died 932 AD)
3. Tafsir Furat Kufi by Furat Ibn Ibrahim al-Kufi (died 964 AD)
4. Tafsir al-Nu'mani by Muhammad b. Ibrahim al-Nu'mani (died 971 AD)
5. Al-Tibbyan Fi Tafsir al-Quran by Shaikh Tusi (995 AD - 1067 AD)
6. Majma' al-Bayan by Shaykh Tabarsi (1073 AD - 1153 AD)
7. Tafsir Safi by Mohsen Fayz Kashani ( ?? - 1680 AD)
8. Al-Burhan Fi Tafsir al-Quran by Syed Hashim al Bahrani (died 1696 AD)
9. Tafsir Noor al-Thaqalayn by Abd al-Ali ibn Juma Aroosi (died 1701 AD)
10. Tafsir al-Mizan by Allamah Tabatabai (1903 AD - 1981 AD)
11. Al-Bayan Fi Tafsir al-Quran by Abu al-Qasim al-Khoei (1899 AD - 1992 AD)
12. Fasal Khizab by Mufti Jafar Hussain (1914 AD - 1982)
13. Tafsir Anwar e Najaf fi Asrar Mushaf by Hussain Bakhsh Jarra (1920 AD - 1990 AD)
14. Tafsir Nemooneh by Naser Makarem Shirazi (1927 AD - Present)
15. Faizan Ur Rehman by Muhammad Hussain Najafi (1932 AD to present)
16. Tasneem Tafsir by Abdollah Javadi Amoli (1933 AD to present)
17. Tafsir Rahnama by Akbar Hashemi Rafsanjani (1934 AD - 2017 AD)
18. Al Kauthar fi Tafsir Al Quran by Mohsin Ali Najafi (1938 AD to Present)
19. Tafseer e Masoomeen (as) compiled by Wilayat Mission

== Hadith collections ==
=== Al-Kutub Al-Arb'ah- the Four books ===
1. Kitab al-Kafi of Kulayni (divided into Usul al-Kafi, Furu al-Kafi and Rawdat al-Kafi)
2. Man La Yahduruhu al-Faqih of Shaikh Saduq
3. Tahdhib al-Ahkam of Shaikh Tusi
4. al-Istibsar of Shaikh Tusi

=== Primary Hadith Collection ===
(Primary Hadith books are those books which are collected, compiled and written by author or their students themselves).

1. Kitaab al-Sulaym ibn Qays al-Hilali by Sulaym ibn Qays
2. Al-Mahasin by Ahmad b. Muhammad al-Barqi
3. Basair al-Darjaat by Sheikh Safaar al-Qummi
4. Kitab al-Ghayba by Muhammad Ibn Ibrahim Ibn Jafar al-Numani
5. Kamil al-Ziyarat by Ibn Qulawayh
6. Uyun Akhbar al-Ridha by Shaykh Saduq
7. Kamal al-din wa tamam al-ni'ma by Shaikh Saduq
8. Ilal al-sharayi by Shaykh Saduq
9. Al-Tawhid by Shaykh Saduq
10. Ma'ani l-akhbar by Shaykh Saduq
11. Al-Amali by Shaykh Saduq
12. Al-Khisal by Shaykh Saduq
13. Thawab al-Aa’maal by Shaykh Saduq
14. Fada'il al-Shi'a by Shaykh Saduq
15. Tuhaf al-Uqul by Ibn Shuba Harrani
16. Al-Ikhtisaas by Shaykh Mufid
17. Al-Amali by Shaykh Mufid
18. Al-Amali by Shayhk Murtaza
19. Al-Amali by Shaykh Tusi
20. Kitab al-Ghayba by Shaykh Tusi
21. Khasais of Al Aemmah by Sharif Al-Radi
22. Al-Ihtijaj by Allama Tabrisi
23. Al Saqib Fi al-Manâqib by Ibn Hamaza Tusi

=== Secondary books of Hadith ===
(Secondary Hadith books are those books which are not collected, compiled and written by author himself but rather they are selected from already existing Hadith books i.e. Primary Hadith books)

1. Al-Wafi by Mohsen Fayz Kashani
2. Wasā'il al-Shīʿa by Shaikh al-Hur al-Aamili
3. Bihar al-Anwar by Allama Majlesi
4. Haq ul-Yaqeen by Allama Majlisi
5. Ayn al-Hayat by Allama Majlisi
6. Hilyat al-Muttaqin by Allama Majlisi
7. Mustadrak Al-wasa'il by Mirza Husain Noori Tabarsi
8. Safinat al-bihar by Shaykh Abbas Qumi
9. Mustadrak safinat al-bihar by Shaykh 'Ali Namazi
10. Jami' ahadith al-Shi'a by Hossein Borujerdi
11. Nahj-al feṣāḥa by Abul Qasem Payandeh
12. Mizan Al Hikma by Mohammad Reyshahri

=== Hadith's Anthologies & Commentaries ===
1. Sharh Usul al-Kafi — by Mohammad Salih al-Mazandarani
2. A Bundle of Flowers — collected by Ayatollah Sayyid Kamal Faghih Imani; a popular English language secondary collection of Shi'a hadith. It narrates traditions from such Shia collections as Kitab al-Kafi and Man la Yahdhuruhu'l Faqih.
3. A Shi'ah Anthology — by William Chittick, Hossein Nasr and Muhammad Husayn Tabataba'i; a brief introduction to exemplary hadith from the 12 Imams.
4. Mir'at al-Uqul (Mirror of the Mind) — by Mohammad Baqir Majlisi is a hadith commentary considered among the most significant commentary on Al-Kafi by the Twelver Shi'a community.

== Shia Jurisprudence (fiqh) ==
1. Urwa al-Wuthqa by Ayatollah Mohammed Kazem Yazdi
2. Shara'i' al-Islam fi masail al-halal wal-haram by Muhaqqiq al-Hilli
3. Jawahir Al Kalam by Ayatollah Muhammad Hasan al-Najafi
4. Madarik al-ahkam fi sharh shara'i' al-Islam by Ayatollah Muhammad Musawi al-Amili
5. Tawdih al-Masa'il by Ayatollah Ali al-Sistani
6. Tawdih al-Masa'il by Grand Ayatollah Hossein Vahid Khorasani

== Theology of Shi'a ==
These books include discussions about Theology of Shi'a (Usul al-din or principles of religion): (Tawḥīd, Nubuwwah (Prophecy), Imamah, Adalah (Justice of God), Maʿad (Resurrection)), etc.

=== Classic Kalam ===
These books seek to give a rational account of Shi'a theology in contrast with the Ash'ari, Mu'tazili and other theological schools of Islam. The contents of these books are taken from the 8th to the 13th century (2nd to 7th century of Islam).

1. Eʿteqādātal-Emāmīya by Shaykh Saduq (923 AD - 991 AD)
2. Al-Amali by Shaykh Saduq (923 AD - 991 AD)
3. Al-Khisal by Shaykh Saduq (923 AD - 991 AD)
4. Awail Al Maqalat by Shaykh Mufid (948 AD - 1022 AD)
5. Al-Amali by Sheikh al-Mufid (948 AD to 1022 AD)
6. Tashih al-I'tiqad by Shaykh Mufid (948 AD - 1022 AD), a correction of Shaykh Saduq's Eʿteqādātal-Emāmīya.
7. Al-Amali by Shayhk Murtaza (965 AD - 1044 AD)
8. Al-Amali by Shaykh Tusi (995 AD - 1067 AD)
9. Tajrid al-I'tiqad by Nasir al-Din Tusi (1201 AD - 1274 AD)
10. E’teqadaat al-Imamiya by Allama Majlisi

=== Modern Kalam ===
These books seek to give a rational account of Shi'a theology in contrast with modern Western ideologies including Marxism and Liberalism during the 20th century.

1. Fundamentals Of Islamic Thought by Morteza Motahhari, trans. R. Campbell: Berkeley, California, Mizan Press, 1982.
2. Man and Universe by Morteza Motahhari

== Ilm ar-Rijal ==
1. Rijal al-Barqi
2. Rijal al-Kashshi by al-Kashshi
3. Rijal al-Najashi by Ahmad ibn Ali al-Najashi
4. Rijal al-Tusi by Shaykh Tusi
5. Al Fehrist by Shaykh Tusi
6. Mojam Rijal e Hadith by Grand Ayatollah Khoei

== History books ==
List of History books
1. Maqtal al-Husayn by Abu Mikhnaf (689 AD - 774 AD)
2. Waq'at Siffin (book) by Nasr ibn Muzahim (737-8 AD - 827 AD)
3. Book of Idols by Hisham ibn al-Kalbi (737 AD - 819 AD)
4. Al-Gharat (book) by Ibrahim ibn Muhammad al-Thaqafi al-Kufi (815 AD - 897 AD)
5. Tarikh al-Yaqubi by Ya'qubi (died 898 AD)
6. Ithbat al-wasiyya (book) by Al-Masudi (896 AD - 956 AD)
7. Kamaaluddin wa Tamamum ul Ne'amah — by Shaikh Saduq (923 AD - 991 AD)
8. Tarikh Qom (book) by Hasan ibn Muhammad ibn Hasan al-Qummi (died 1015 AD)
9. Kitab al-Irshad also known as Tazkar-tul-Athar by Shaykh Al-Mufid (948 AD - 1022 AD)
10. Al-Jamal (book) by Shaykh Al-Mufid (948 AD - 1022 AD)
11. Masarr al-Shi'a (book) by Shaykh Al-Mufid (948 AD - 1022 AD)
12. Dala'il al-imama (book) by Muhammad ibn Jarir al-Tabari al-Saghir (10th century AD)
13. Kashf al-ghumma fi ma'rifat al-a'imma (book) by Baha' al-Din 'Ali ibn 'Isa al-Irbili (1223-28 AD - 1294 AD)
14. Al-Luhuf ala qatla l-tufuf (book) by Sayyed Ibn Tawus (1193 AD - 1266 AD)
15. Majalis al-muminin— by Qazi Nurullah Shustari (1542 AD - 1610 AD)
16. Hayat al-qulub (book) by Mohammad-Baqer Majlesi (died 1699 AD)
17. Hilyat al-abrar fi ahwal Muhammad wa alih al-athar (book) by Seyyed Hashem Bahrani (1640 AD - 1698 AD)
18. Al-Tatimma fi tawarikh al-a'imma by al-Sayyid Taj al-Din al-Husayni al-'Amili (11th century AH)
19. Riyad al-abrar fi manaqib al-a'immat al-athar (book) by Nematollah Jazayeri (1640 AD - 1701 AD)
20. Jala' al-'uyun (book) by Mohammad-Baqer Majlesi (died 1699 AD)
21. Nafas al-mahmum (book) by Abbas Qomi (1877 AD - 1940 AD)
22. Al-Shia wa l-hakimun (book) by Muhammad Jawad Mughniyya (1904 AD - 1979 AD)
23. The Message — by Grand Ayatollah Ja'far Sobhani (1929 - Present)
24. Al-Sahih Men Sirat Al-Nabi Al-Azam by Jafar Morteza Ameli (15th Century) (1945 AD - 2019 AD)
25. Tragedy of al-Zahra’ (book) by Jafar Morteza Ameli (1945 AD - 2019 AD)
26. Saadat ud-Darain fi Maqtal al-Hussain— by Muhammad Hussain Najafi

== Bibliography of Ahl al-Bayt ==
The following books are based on the biographies of the 12 Imams:

- Kitab al-Irshad by Shaykh Mufid
- Bihar al-Anwar (contains 110 volumes out of which various volumes are based on the biographies of the 14 Infallibles) by Allama Majlisi
- Jila al-Uyoon by Allama Majlisi
- Kashf al-ghumma fi ma'rifat al-a'imma by Baha'al-Din Ali b. Isa al-Irbili
- Hilyat al-Abraar by Shaykh Yusuf al-Bahrani
- Muntahi al-Amal by Shaykh Abbas Qumi
- Encyclopedia of the Biography of Ahl Al-Bayt (English) (Arabic) (40 Vol.) by Baqir Sharif Al-Qurashi (1925 - 2012)
- Fatemeh is Fatemeh by Ali Shariati (1933 – 1977) (about Fatimah al-Zahra)

== Polemics ==
1. Al Muraja'at — by Abd al-Husayn Sharaf al-Din al-Musawi (1872 AD - 1957 AD)
2. Peshawar Nights — by Sultanu'l-Wa'izin Shirazi (1894 AD - 1971 AD)
3. Al-Ghadir — by Allamah Amini (1902 AD - 1970 AD) — (About the Hadith of Ghadir from Sunni books)
4. The Role of Holy Imams (a.s.) in the Revival of Religion (Vol.1& Vol.2& Vol.3) — by Sayyid Murtadha al-'Askari (1914 AD - 2007)
5. Imamate and Leadership — by Mujtaba Musavi Lari (1925 AD – 2013 AD)
6. Then I was Guided (book) — by Muhammad al-Tijani (1943 AD - Present)
7. The Shi'ah are (the real) Ahl al-Sunnah (book) — by Muhammad al-Tijani (1943 AD - Present)
8. Ask Those Who Know (book) — by Muhammad al-Tijani (1943 AD - Present)
9. To be with the truthful (book) — by Muhammad al-Tijani (1943 AD - Present)
10. A Shi'ite Encyclopedia (book) — by Ahlul Bayt Digital Islamic Library Project (https://www.al-islam.org/)
11. Isbat ul-Imamat (book)— by Muhammad Hussain Najafi
12. Tajalliat-e-Sadaqat fi Jawab Aftab-e-Hidayat (book)— by Muhammad Hussain Najafi
13. Tahqeeqat ul-Fariqain fi Hadis as-Saqlain (book)— by Muhammad Hussain Najafi
14. Tanzeeh ul-imamia (book)— by Muhammad Hussain Najafi

== Dua (Invocation) ==
List of Supplications books

1. Al-Sahifa al-Sajjadiyya by Imam Zayn al-Abidin (a collection of Duas)
2. Mafatih al-Jinan by Shaykh 'Abbas Qummi (a collection of Duas)
3. Misbah ul Mutahajid by Shaykh Tusi (a collection of Duas)
4. Zaad-ul-Ibad li-youmil-Ma'ad by Muhammad Hussain Najafi (a collection of Duas)from reliable books

== See also ==
- List of Sunni books
- List of Islamic texts
