= The Fifteen Whispered Prayers =

Collection of fifteen prayers attributed to Ali ibn Husayn Zayn al-Abidin

The Fifteen Whispered Prayers (Arabic: ٱلْمُنَاجَيَاتُ الخَمْسَ عَشْرَةَ), also known as The Fifteen Munajayat, is a collection of fifteen prayers attributed to Ali ibn Husayn Zayn al-Abidin (Imam Sajjad), the fourth Imam of Shia Muslims. Imam Sajjad is also the author of Al-Sahifa al-Sajjadiyya, another collection of prayers, and some researchers regard the Whispered Prayers as a supplementary part of the latter collection.

== Contents ==
[S]eparation from You has wrapped me in the clothing of my misery! My dreadful crimes have deadened my heart, so bring it to life by a repentance from You! (Note: Quoted from The Whispered Prayer of the Repenters (first prayer))

... Act toward me with the forgiveness and mercy of which You are worthy! Act not toward me with the chastisement and vengeance of which I am worthy! By Your mercy, O Most Merciful of the merciful! (Note: Quoted from the Whispered Prayer of the Desirous (fifth prayer))

... My God, who can have tasted the sweetness of your love, then wanted another in place of You? Who can have become intimate with Your nearness, then sought removal from You? (Note: Quoted from the Whispered Prayer of the Lovers (ninth prayer))

— Ali ibn Husayn Zayn al-Abidin

The Fifteen Whispered Prayers are meant to allow everyone to recite the prayer which is in most accordance with their present mood and feeling. The prayers start with 'repentance', as repentance is the first step towards a genuine communion with God.

1. The Whispered Prayer of the Repenters
2. The Whispered Prayer of the Complainants
3. The Whispered Prayer of the Fearful
4. The Whispered Prayer of the Hopeful
5. The Whispered Prayer of the Desirous
6. The Whispered Prayer of the Grateful
7. The Whispered Prayer of the Obedient Toward God
8. The Whispered Prayer of the Devotees
9. The Whispered Prayer of the Lovers
10. The Whispered Prayer of the Mediation Seekers
11. The Whispered Prayer of the Utterly Poor
12. The Whispered Prayer of the Enlightened
13. The Whispered Prayer of the Aware
14. The Whispered Prayer of the Asylum Seekers
15. The Whispered Prayer of the Ascetic

== Background ==
In the time of Imam Ali ibn Husayn Zayn al-Abidin, Islam was characterized by ignorance and corruption. Yazid and Marwan Ibn Hakam, who proclaimed themselves Amir al-Mu'minin, the leaders of Muslims, were, in fact, twisting the teachings of Islam. Nevertheless, no Muslim dared challenge their reign. The uprising of Imam Husayn ibn Ali against Yazid was mercilessly crushed. In a bloody encounter known as Battle of Karbala, all of Imam Husayn's men were slain except his young son, Ali, who was severely ill during that battle. At such a time when all freedom movements had been crushed and no one felt safe to speak out, prayer was the only vehicle to promote the true essence of Islam without arousing the caliph's ire.

== Analysis ==
Muhammad Jamaluddin al-Makki al-Amili, known as al-Shaheed al-Awwal (the first martyr) is said to have collected and added the fifteen prayers to the Al-Sahifa al-Sajjadiyya in his book Al-Lum'at al-Dimashqiyya (The Damascene Glitter). Afterwards, most scholars who have written about the fifteen whispered prayers, considered them as a complementary section of the Al-Sahifa al-Sajjadiyya, while some others distinguished between the 54 supplications which makes the main body of Sahifa, and the added part which consists of the fifteen whispered prayers. According to Chittick the original fifty-four supplications "show an undeniable freshness and unity of theme and style, while the latter… add a certain orderliness and self-conscious artistry which may suggest the hand of an editor." Nevertheless, these prayers have come to the attention of Shiites by Muhammad Baqir Majlisi who has narrated them in the authority of some companions of Imam Zayn al-Abedin from the Imam.

== See also ==
- Al-Sahifa al-Sajjadiyya
- Supplication of Abu Hamza al-Thumali
- Nahj al-Balagha
- Al-Risalah al-Dhahabiah
- Al-Risalah al-Huquq
- Al-Sahifat al-Ridha
- List of Shia books
