= Kamil al-Ziyarat =

Hadith collection by Ibn Qulawayh

- Front cover of Kamil al-Ziyarat
- Author: Ibn Qulawayh
- Language: English
- Published: Shiabooks.ca Press
- Media type: Book
- ISBN: 978-0978147815

Kamil al-Ziyarat (Arabic: كامل الزيارات, romanized: Kāmil al-Ziyārāt, lit. 'The Complete Pilgrimage Guide') is a Hadith collection of 843 traditions, by the famous Twelver Shia Hadith scholar Abu al-Qasim Ja'far b. Muhammad b. Ja'far b. Musa b. Qulawayh a-Qummi al-Bahdadi, commonly known as Ibn Qulawayh.

== Author ==
Abul-Gasem Jafar b. Mohammad b. Jafar b. Musab Qulawayh Qumi Bagdadi, known as Ibn Qulawayh was a dominant Shia traditionist and jurist. shaykh Al-Kulayni was his teacher and Al-Shaykh Al-Mufid was one of his students. Ibn Qulawayh studied at Qum and Egypt. He authored many books that the most prominent is kamil al-ziyarat.

== Authenticity ==
Ibn Qulawayh's father had relationship with Sad ibn Abdallah al-Qummi al-Ashari, a great Qummi traditionist. The reference of the narration attributed to al-Kulayni and Ali ibn Babawayh Qummi and al-Numani was Sad ibn Abdallah. In kamil al-ziyarat, 61 per cent of traditions had been collected from Qummis like his father in Qum and 13 per cent of them had been narrated from prominent Kufan, Muhammad b. Jafar, al-Bazzaz. This is contingent that in order to collecting traditions Ibn Qulawayh travelled to Baghdad and Egypt. kamil al-ziyarat had been used for developing of some reliable sources like al-Mazar by Al-Shaykh Al-Mufid, Tahdhib al-Ahkam and al-Istibsar by Shaykh Tusi, Bihar al-Anwar, Mustadrak al-Wasa'el and Wasa'el ash-Shi'a.

== Context ==
Kamil al-Ziyarat is known as other titles such as al-Ziyarat, Kamal al-Ziyarat but the author had considered Kamil al-Ziyarat for this book. It contains 843 traditions that set up in 801 chapters.

The Shia nature of the Kamil al-Ziyarat became apparent in some specific chapters of the book. There is 52 traditions at 8-15 chapters associated to Ziyarat of Imam Ali’s grave. Also 69 per cent of tradition are related to visiting of Husayn ibn Ali’s grave.

This book contains following subjects:

- The charity of visiting ( Ziyārah ) the Muhammad prophet’s grave
- The charity and manner of the visiting of the grave of Ali ibn Abi Talib
- The charity and manner of the visiting of the grave of Hasan ibn Ali
- The charity and manner of the visiting of the grave of Husayn ibn Ali, the charity of Mourning for him
- The manner of the visiting of the graves of Musa al-Kazim and Muhammad al-Jawad
- The manner of the visiting of graves of the others The Fourteen Infallibles
- The manner of the visiting of graves of the believers
- The manner of the visiting of graves of the Imamzadeh (an immediate descendant of a Shia Imam )

== Manuscripts ==
The following version are available:

- At the library of Islamic Consultative Assembly, written by Mohammad Shafi Rahmani, in 1083 AH
- At the Central Library of Astan Quds Razavi, written by Abu al-Qasim Najafi

== See also ==
- List of Shi'a books
- The Four Books
- Al-Kafi
- Man la yahduruhu al-Faqih*
