= Shia view of the Quran =

The Shia view of the Quran differs from the Sunni view, but the majority of both groups believe that the text is identical. While some Shia disputed the canonical validity of the Uthmanic codex, the Shia Imams always rejected the idea of alteration of Qur'an's text. Only seven Shia scholars have believed in omissions in the Uthmanic codex.

== History ==
The Shī‘ah use the same Qur'an as Sunni Muslims, however they do not believe that it was first compiled by Uthman ibn Affan. The Shī‘ah believe that the Qur'an was gathered and compiled by Muhammad during his lifetime. This completed version of the Qur'an was kept next to the pulpit of Muhammad within the Mosque of Madinah, where scholars would come to transcribe more copies. Furthermore, Grand Ayatollah Abu al-Qasim al-Khoei believed that Ali possessed a Quran (Tafseer) of his own, which included the divinely revealed commentary of the Quran.

However, Shia have been accused since at least the 10th century by anti-Shia Sunni Muslims of espousing a theory that the contemporary Quran differs from what was revealed to Muhammad because it was (allegedly) edited to remove mention of the importance of Ali — the Shia icon and first Shia Imam. The idea that the Quran was distorted is regarded by these Sunnis as one of the most blatant examples of Shia "heresy". (An example of a denunciation of tabdil — the belief that the Quran was altered — can be found in the work of the 11th century Muslim scholar Ibn Hazm replying to Christian debating point "that the Rawafid [a derogatory name for Shia] maintain that the Companions of your Prophet altered the Koran by way of omissions and additions".)

According to the western Islamic scholar Etan Kohlberg, Twelver Shia did at one time believe in the distortion of the Quran — and it was common among Shia during the early Islamic centuries, but waned during the era of the Būyid Amirs (934–1062). Kohlberg claims that Ibn Babawayh was the first major Twelver author "to adopt a position identical to that of the Sunnis". This change in belief was primarily a result of the Shia "rise to power at the centre of the Sunni 'Abbasid caliphate," from where belief in the corruption of the Quran became untenable vis-a-vis the position of Sunni “orthodoxy”. Among other reasons, the distortion was alleged to have been carried out to remove any references to the rights of Ali and the Imams, the approval of their supporters and the disapproval of their enemies, such as specific Umayyads and Abbasids. According to William St. Clair Tisdall, if such content had existed in the Quran then "Of course the Sunnite Khalifahs had very great reason to endeavour to suppress any such passages".

== Claims and defenses ==
There are some common disputed accusations about the Shī‘ah regarding their beliefs.

While Sunnis and the Shī‘ah accept the same text of the Qur'an, some, such as Muhibb-ud-Deen Al-Khatib, claim that Shī‘ah dispute the current version, including that they add two additional sūratayn, an-Nūrayn and al-Wilāya. This accusation of tahrīf "tampering" is antithetical to scholars and is considered polemical.

Shī‘ah Muslims consider the accusation that they are using a different Qur'an as one of the misconceptions about the Shi'a. The Shī‘ah recite the Qur'an according to the Qira’t of Hafs on authority of ‘Asim, which is the prevalent Qira’t in the Islamic world.

Shia hadith collections contain differing reports about the ahruf. Al-Kafi records a report attributed to Ja'far al-Sadiq rejecting revelation in seven ahruf and affirming one instead. Al-Khisal preserves another report attributed to him linking seven ahruf with an imam's ability to issue rulings in seven ways.

The issue of Tahreef [tampering] has been a matter of disagreement between many classical Shia scholars. It has been mentioned that the likes of Muhammad Baqir Majlisi (author of Bihar al-Anwar), Muhammad ibn Ya'qub al-Kulayni (author of Kitab al-Kafi), Ni'matullah Al Jazaa'iri (author of Anwar Al Nu'maniyyah, d. 1701) and Al Ayyaashi (author of Tafsir Ayyashi) among others were of the view that the present Qur'an is not the same as was revealed to Muhammad ibn Abdullah and that omission/corruption has taken place. Overall, it is claimed that the Shia have more than 1,000 hadiths ascribed to the Shia Imams which indicate the distortion of the Quran.

According to Muhammad Baqir Majlisi, the difference of opinion among the scholars and jurists was as follows:

No one from the people claimed…’: meaning, those other than the Imāms (as). What is meant by ‘the entire Qur’ān’ is all its words and letters, and what is meant by ‘as it was revealed’ is its arrangement, declensions, vowellike and vowelless diacritics, and the length of verses and chapters.

This is a refutation of the faction that claims that the Qur’ān is what is in the known copies and as read by the reciters of the seven variant readings and their likes.

Our associates differed concerning that; al-Şadūq ibn Bābawayh and a group opined that the Qur’ān did not alter from how it was revealed and nothing was deleted from it, while al-Kulaynī and al-Shaykh al-Mufīd—may Allāh sanctify both of their souls!—and a group opined that the whole Qur’ān is with the Imāms and what is in the copies is some of it. And the Commander of the Believers [`Alī] (as) compiled it as it was revealed after the Messenger, and went out to the hypocritical Companions, but they did not accept it from him and rather approached its compilation during the reigns of `Umar and `Uthmān, as it will soon be detailed in Kitāb al-Qur’ān.

Some accused Shī‘ah of alleging that Fatimah had her own Mus'haf (Qur'an), the Mushaf of Fatimah, which was allegedly three times larger than the current Qur'an. Again, Shī‘ahs reject this as a misrepresentation of facts aimed at discrediting them. According to Momen Shiite Imams had certain books (including of Fatimah (Mashafe Fatimah) a book revealed by Gabriel to Fatimah to console her on the death of her father) in their possession, none of them were Quran.

== Shia scholars who supported existence of Qur'anic distortion ==
Some Shia scholars who supported the view that the Qur'anic text had been distorted were:

- Shia author Ahmad ibn Muhammad al-Sayyari (9th century)
- Ali Ibn Ibrahim Qomi (d. 919)
- Al-Ayyashi (d. 932)
- Muhammad ibn Ya'qub al-Kulayni (d. 941)
- Al-Shaykh Al-Mufid (d. 1022) — spoke of the alteration which occurred in the ordering of Quranic verses (ta'līf).
- Mohsen Fayz Kashani (d. 1680)
- Mohammad Salih al-Mazandarani (d. 1680)
- Muhammad Baqir al-Majlisi (d. 1698)
- Ni'matullah Al Jazaa'iri (d. 1701)
- al-Sayyid `Alī Khān al-Madanī (d. 1708)
- Muhammad Baqir Behbahani (d. 1791) — who wrote in al-Fawā'id al-ḥā'iriyya: "It is clear from the many akhbār that [corruption] occurred... Our position is that it is permitted to act upon one of the famous seven variants [of the Qur'ān]. The indicator for this position is the statement, or rather the order, of the Imams that "You must recite as the people recite until the day of the return of the qā'im"."
- Muhammad Mahdi al-Naraqi (d. 1795)
- `Abdullah Shubbar (d. 1827)
- Mirza Husain Noori Tabarsi (d. 1902) — who authored the book Fasl al-Khitab fi Tahrif Kitab Rabb al-Arbab (The Decisive Statement on the Distortion of the Book of the Lord of Lords), a work entirely dedicated to gathering narrations that allege the distortion of the Quran.
- Sultan Muhammad al-Janabidhi (d. 1909)
- Muhammad al-Lucknawi
- Agha Bozorg Tehrani (d. 1970)

Many other Shia scholars have held ambiguous attitudes towards corruption of the Quran, such as Mulla Ahmad Naraqi (d. 1829), Morteza Ansari (d. 1864), Mohammad-Kazem Khorasani (d. 1911) and Ruhollah Khomeini (d. 1989).

== Tafsīr and additional chapters in Shia Islam ==
The Shī‘ah tafsīr on several verses are different from the traditional Sunni view either through a totally different interpretation or by giving the same interpretation, but giving that interpretation a larger impact on their jurisprudence. Shia also tend to interpret the Quran more allegorically (Batin) and less literally than Sunnis. For example, Shia writers, including Ali Ibn Ibrahim Qomi, usually allegorically interpret the term Bani Isra'il (sons/tribe of Israel) as a code word for the Ahlul Bayt.

William St. Clair Tisdall, among other western scholars, has published on the account of differences in content of a Shi'ite version of the Quran.

=== 33:33 ===
Ahl al-Kisa

=== 4:24 ===
4:24, or an-Nisa, 24, also called as "the verse of Mut‘ah", is the Qur'anic verse that some Shī'ites use to prove the legality of temporary marriages (Arabic: Nikah Mut'ah).

=== Sūrat al-nūrayn ===
Sura of Lights.

== See also ==
- List of Shia books
- Al-Jafr (book)
- Al-Jamia
- Criticism of Twelver Shia Islam
- Islamic schools and branches
- Schools of Islamic theology
