= Al-Wafi =

Hadith collection by Mohsen Fayz Kashani

- Author: Mohsen Fayz Kashani
- Language: Arabic
- Genre: Hadith

Al-Wafi (Arabic: الوافي) is a Hadith collection by Mohsen Fayz Kashani who is a scholar in different fields. It includes all traditions in the Four Books of Shia.

== Author ==
Mohsen Feyz Kashani known as Mulla Muhsin Fayz Kashani was a scholar expert in different fields such as hadith, exegesis, ethics, and in gnosis and intellectual intuition. He was a student of Bahāʾ al-dīn al-ʿĀmilī and Mir Damad and Mulla Sadra. He wrote more than a hundred and twenty books to Persian and Arabic.

== Prelude ==
Fayz Kashani described in the introduction what led him to write this book because the absence of a unique pattern to collect the hadith and Ahkam in the Four Books which were collected hadiths in the different times with various method. Therefore, he authored the book Al-wafi and collected narratives in specific categories, and removed the Repeated items. He made clear the obscure narratives, in terms of their meaning or vocabulary or from others aspect, which needed to brief explanation.

== Context ==
The book includes all traditions in the four books of Shia. Kashani explained and classified them in the book. He arranged his book on an introduction, 14 volumes, and a conclusion. Each volumes has an introduction and a conclusion. The list of 14 volumes includes:

- Reason and ignorance and tawhid
- Hujja
- Faith and unbelief
- purity and Al-Zaynah
- Salah and Quran and dua
- Zakat and khums and inheritance
- Fasting and Iʿtikāf and treaty
- Hajj and Umrah and pilgrimage
- Enjoining good and forbidding wrong and jurisdiction and witnesses
- Ways of living, jobs and transactions
- Food and drink and luxury
- Marriage in Islam and divorce and birth
- Death and religious duties and wills
- Rawda containing various hadiths

=== Recitations ===
Mohammad Alam-al-Hoda, son of Kashani, wrote a commentary on Al-Wafi.

== See also ==
- Shia Islam
- List of Shia books
- Shaikh al-Hur al-Aamili
