= Uyoun Akhbar Al-Ridha =

Book by Muḥammad Ibn-ʿAlī Ibn-Bābūya

ʿUyūn ʾAkhbār ar-Riḍā
- Author: Ibn Babawayh
- Language: Persian, English, Arabic
- Genre: Hadith, History of Islam
- Publication date: 1998
- Media type: Print book

Uyoun Akhbar Al-Ridha (Arabic: عُيُون أَخْبَار ٱلرِّضَا, ʿUyūn ʾAkhbār ar-Riḍā), counted as a Hadith book among Shia, the book was written by Ibn Babawayh, one of the great scholars of Shia Muslims. The book concerned with saying and life of the eighth Shia Imam Ali al-Ridha.

== Compiler ==
Abu Ja'far Muhammad ibn 'Ali ibn Babawayh al-Qummi, better known as Ibn Babawayh or Sheikh al-Saduq, was born circa 923 in Qom and died 991 in Rayy. He was also author of one of the authoritative four books of Hadith Man La Yahduruhu al-Faqih. Ibn Babawayh was a Twelver Shi‘icompiler of Man la Yahdaruhu al-Faqih (He Who Has No Jurisprudence with Him), which was later considered the second great collection of Twelver Shi‘i hadith, after Kulayni's al-Kafi, and numerous other collections of the Imams’ traditions. Ibn Babawayh collected many traditions from his father, a throughout the region collecting traditions. His Uyoun Akhbar al-Rida (Sources of the Traditions of al-Rida), was the product of a sojourn to Greater Khorasan in search of the traditions of the eighth Imam ‘Ali al-Rida (d. 202/818).

== Similar books ==
There are two books which titled by the name of Al Ridha. In other words they are also concerned to Imam Ridha' Life before Uyun Al Akhbar. They Are as follow: Wafat al-Rida written by Abu Salt Herawi; Akhbar Ali b. Musa al-Rida (a) written by Abd al-Aziz b. Yahya Juludi. Also there are three books with the title of Uyun, as named below:

- 'Uyun al-akhbar and 'Uyun sihah al-akhbar fi manaqib al-abrar, which were both written by Yahya b. Bitriq (7th century AH).
- 'Uyun al-akhbar written by Abu Muhammad 'Abd al-Rahman b. Abi Bakr Neyshaburi Razi.
- 'Uyun al-akhbar wa l-athar fi dhikr al-Nabi al-Mustafa al-mukhtar wa wasiyyat Ali b. Abi Talib qatil al-kuffar wa alih al-a'immat al-athar written by 'Imad al-Din Idris b. Hassan Abdullah al-Anaf.

== Importance ==
The book counted as the reference Hadith book among Shia such that many valuable books such as Bihar al-Anwar refer to it. The book also was respected by great philosophers like Mirdamad one of the great masters of Philosophical school of Isfahan. He says about Uyun Akhbar Al Ridha: "Uyun Akhbar al-Reza polishes the blight of sadness off the heart. There has never been anything to the world like it for the onlookers of the east and the west, and any knowledge in its parts suffice you like the sun of guiding light which fulfills desires of the heart."

== Motive of writing ==
The book has been written by Ibn Babawayh in response to Sahib Ibn Abbad, the minister and ruler in Daylami Dynasty, one who written a poem in praise of Ali. 'Uyun akhbar al-Rida.

== Structure ==
The numbers of chapters in each manuscript are different, in some manuscripts, there are 69 chapters, in some of them there are 71, and in some other 73 and 139 chapters are listed. The book includes the following subjects: - Imamate of Imam Reza - His characteristic - Debate of Imam's ancestors with the opponents - Imam's miracles - Imam's attitude - The status of crown-princeship.

== Translation and gloss ==
It was also translated into Persian by Muhammad Taqi Najafi Isfahani (d. 1914) and was published in 1908 in Isfahan. The book was also translated to English by Dr. Ali Peiravi and published by the Asnariyan Publication in 2 volumes. Seyyed Nemat Allah Jazayeri wrote an explanation for this book, called “The Shiny Light”. Aqa Bozorg Tehrani mentioned six glosses or commentary written on the book. Some of them are as follow:

- Persian commentary of Shaykh Muhammad Ali Hazin Zahedi Gilani (d. 1181 AH)
- The commentary written by Mawla Hadi Bonabi (d. 1281 AH) among students of Shaykh Murtada Ansari
- Persian commentary of Sayyid Ali Asghar Shushtari
- Marginal notes of Sayyid Hussayn Mujtahid Qazwini
- Glosses written by Sayyid Hussayn b. Hassan 'Amili Karaki

== See also ==
- Al-Khisal
- Al-Amali of Shaykh Mufid
- Al-Amali of Shaykh Saduq
- Eʿteqādātal-Emāmīya
