= Reality of Certainty =

Book by Muḥammad Bāqir Ibn-Muḥammad Taqī Maǧlisī

- Author: Muhammad Baqir Majlisi
- Original title: حق‌اليقين
- Language: Arabic
- Genre: Hadith collection
- Published: 16th century CE
- Publication place: Safavid Empire

Reality of Certainty (Arabic: حق‌اليقين, romanized: Ḥaqq al-Yaqīn) is a Shiite collection of hadiths (Islamic narrations) authored by Muhammad Baqir Majlisi in the 16th century.

It is a major secondary source of hadiths, which elaborates on hadith drawn from primary sources compiled centuries earlier such as Kitab al-Kafi and Man la yahduruh al-Faqih. Most of the primary Shia hadith collections are from the 10th and 11th centuries CE, and the secondary ones are either from the late Mongol (14th century) or Safavid era (16th-17th centuries).

Although it contains narrations that are considered weak by Shia scholars, it also has many considered as strong narrations, and it is a well-researched book and contains more or less complete chains of narrations, which many earlier books (including the Sunni collections of Bukhari and Muslim) tend to omit. According to the Shia scholarly point of view, all books of narration have at least a few weak narrators, since they were compiled by fallible people, therefore having weak narrators does not invalidate the whole book because narration are to be individually graded on their authenticity.

== Content ==
Contents of book include:

- Some hadiths related to the Shia view of Umar
- Hadiths related to Islamic ethics and the central beliefs of Islam
- Hadiths with practical advice on living life in accordance with Islamic law (Sharia)

== See also ==
- List of Shi'a books
- Nahj al-Balaghah
- Bihar al-Anwar
- Kitab al-Kafi
