= Sahifah =

Ṣaḥīfah (Arabic: صحيفة), also spelled sahifa or sahifeh, is an Arabic word meaning 'writing', 'book', or 'volume'. It may refer to:

- al-Sahifa al-Sajjadiyya, a book of supplications attributed to Ali ibn Husayn, the great-grandson of the Islamic prophet Muhammad and the fourth Shia Imam
- the Sahifah of al-Ridha, a collection of 240 hadiths attributed to Ali ibn Musa al-Rida, the eighth Shia Imam
- Sahifat Hammam ibn Munabbih, an early hadith collection attributed to Hammam ibn Munabbih (died 711BC or 748BC)

== See also ==
- Mushaf, a bound collection of ṣaḥīfahs.
