= Manaqib =

Manāqib (Arabic مَناقِب, also transliterated manāḳib; singular مَنْقَبَ, manqaba/manḳaba) is a genre in Arabic, Turkish, and Persian literature, broadly encompassing "biographical works of a laudatory nature", "in which the merits, virtues and remarkable deeds of the individual concerned are given prominence" and particularly hagiographies (biographies of holy people). The principal goal of such works "is to offer to the reader a moral portrait and information on the noble actions of the individuals who constitute their subject or on the superior merits of a certain group". Such texts are valuable sources for the socio-political and religious history of early and medieval Islam.

== Etymology and usage ==
The usage of the word manāqib has varied over time and from one author to another, which is reflected in medieval Arabic scholarship by diverse opinions about the word's etymological meaning. The main possible explanations are:

- The root n-q-b, which is associated with the meaning “perforate, pierce”, in which case the idea behind the term manāqib is that it succeeds in penetrating the secrets of its subject's biography.
- The verb naqaba means “walked, followed a narrow path”, so the term manāqib might derive from the idea that a biography is metaphorically a record of a person's journey through life: a similar development is apparent in the word sīra, which literally means "journey" but is the term for a genre of prophetic biographies.

Because the term manāqib came to be closely associated with Sufi saints, it later also came to mean "miracles".

Like many genre terms, the term manāqib is not neatly defined, and the usage of the term overlaps with a wide range of other Arabic genre terms. Some are fairly neutral in tone: tarjama ("biography"), taʿrīf ("history"), akhbār (collections of historical traditions), sīra ("biographies of prophets"). Others are more expressive: faḍāʾil (“virtues”), maʾāt̲h̲ir and mafākhir (“exploits”), and akhlāq (apparently synonymous with manāqib).

== Subject ==
The earliest texts labelled as manāqib have generally not survived, and their existence is known only from bibliographic lists made by medieval scholars.

From the 4th A.H. / 10th A.D. century onwards, manāqib were produced focusing on biographies of the imams (madhāhib) who founded different schools of Islamic thought (madhhab) about shariʿa, primarily: Abū Ḥanīfa (d. ca. 150/767), al-Awzāʿī (d. 157/774), Mālik b. Anas (d. 178/795), al-S̲h̲āfiʿī (d. 204/820), and Aḥmad b. Ḥanbal (d. 241/855). These were intended to edify the communities associated with these schools of thought, encouraging people to emulate their founders' (supposed) virtues. The fashion extended to biographical dictionaries of the disciples of each school, and sometimes biographies of particular disciples, primarily: Ibn Taymiyya (d. 728/1328), Saḥnūn (d. 240/854), al-Ḳābisī (d. 403/1012), and Abū Bakr Aḥmad ibn ʿAbd al-Raḥmān (d. 432 or 435/1040-3).

From this time too, however, manāqib were increasingly produced in praise of people who achieved the status of saints in some varieties of Islam, distinguished particularly by their (supposed) miracles. This trend pertained particularly to the Maghrib, with key subjects of manāqib including: Abū Yazīd (d. 336/947), al-Rabīʿ ibn al-Qaṭṭān (d. 334/946), al-Mammasī (d. 333/944), al-Sabāʾī (d. 356/966), al-Jabanyānī (d. 369/979), and the patron saint of Tunis, Sīdī Maḥrez (d. 413/1022). The genre then spread to Arab Africa more generally, and onto the Turkic- and Persian-speaking worlds. Production of such texts declined around the seventeenth century CE.

== See also ==
- Prophetic biography
- Manaqib Of Ale Abi Talib
- Al Saqib Fi al-Manâqib
