= Uyun al-akhbar =

Uyun al-akhbar ("Choice Narratives") can refer to:

- Uyoun Akhbar Al-Ridha an Ibn Babawayh work about Ali al-Ridha traditions.
- a four-volume biographical work of eminent figures by the 9th-century scholar Ibn Qutaybah
- a seven-volume history of the 15th-century Yemeni Ismaili leader Idris Imad al-Din
