= Abu Hamza al-Thumali =

Companion of Shia Imams Ali al-Sajjad and Muhammad al-Baqir

Abū Ḥamza al-Thumālī

Personal life
- Born: after 82 Hijri (701-2 CE)
- Died: after 150 Hijri (767-7 CE)
- Region: Kufa
- Notable work: Risalat al-Huquq (transmission)

Religious life
- Religion: Islam
- Denomination: Shia

Muslim leader
- Disciple of: Ali al-Sajjad, Muhammad al-Baqir

Thābit ibn Abī Ṣafiyya famously known as Abū Ḥamza al-Thumālī Thābit ibn Dīnār (Arabic: أبو حمزة الثمالي) (born before 82 Hijri/701 CE – died after 150 Hijri/767 CE), was a Shia Muslim and a companion of Shia Imams Ali al-Sajjad (680–712) and Muhammad al-Baqir (712–732). He is known for transmitting the text for Risalat al-Huquq and the Supplication of Abu Hamza al-Thumali from Ali al-Sajjad. He is regarded as a trustworthy hadith transmitter by Shias, but untrustworthy by Sunni hadith scholars.

== Life ==
Abu Hamza al-Thumali claimed to be a companion of Ali al-Sajjad. He also claimed to be a companion of Muhammad al-Baqir and Ja'far al-Sadiq. Al-Najashi said: “He was the best of our companions and the most reliable of them in narration and tradition.” It was reported that Ali al-Rida said: “Abu Hamza at his time is like Salman at his time.” Shia rijal books say that Abu Hamza consumed prohibited intoxicants. His sons died as martyrs with the great revolutionist, Zayd ibn Ali.

He died in the year 150 A.H.

== Status as a narrator ==
Sunni hadith scholars have made several remarks about Thābit ibn Abī Ṣafiyya:

- Umar ibn Hafs ibn Ghiyath (d. 222): “My father abandoned the hadith of Abu Hamzah Al-Thumali.”
- Ibn Sa'd (d. 230): “He was weak.”
- Yahya ibn Ma'in (d. 233): “He is worthless.”
- Imam Ahmad ibn Hanbal (d. 241): “He is weak, he is worthless.”
- ‘Amr Al-Fallas (d. 249): “He is not reliable.”
- Al-Jawzajani (d. 259): “He was extremely weak (wahi) in hadith.”
- Abu Zur’ah (d. 265): “He is weak.”
- Abu Hatem (d. 277): “He is weak in hadith. His hadith should be written but it cannot be relied upon.”
- Ya’qub b. Sufyan (d. 277): “He is weak.”
- Imam Al-Nasa'i (d. 303): “He is not reliable.”
- Al-‘Uqayli (d. 322), Al-Dulabi (d. 310), and Ibn Al-Jarud (d. 307) and others weakened him.
- Ibn Hibban (d. 354): “He was very delusional in his transmission such that he cannot be relied upon whenever he exclusively transmits anything, along with his extremism in Shi’ism.”
- Ibn ‘Adiyy (d. 365): “His weakness is apparent in his transmission, and he is closer to weakness.”
- al-Daraqutni (d. 385): “He is abandoned (matruk).”
- Ibn ‘Abdilbarr (d. 463): “He is not strong according to them. There was weakness in his hadith.”

In contrast, Shia hadith scholars consider him a reliable narrator.

== Works ==
- Kitab fi Tafsir al-Quran al-Karim (An exegesis of the Quran).
- Kitab al-Nawadir (A Book on the rare things).
- Kitab al-Zuhd (A Book on Asceticism).

== Supplication of Abu Hamza al-Thumali ==
Abu Hamza al-Thumali has related that during the month of Ramadhan, Ali Zayn al-Abidin used to spend a greater part of the night in prayers and when it used to be the time of beginning of the fast he recited a supplication which later known as Du'a Abi Hamzah al-Thumali (The supplication of Abi Hamzah al-Thumali). This supplication has been recorded in the book Misbah al-Mutahijjid of Shaykh Tusi.

== See also ==
- List of Shi'a Muslim scholars of Islam
- Sayyid Murtadhā
- Sayyid Radhī
- Shaykh al-Mufīd
- Shaykh al-Tūsī
- Shaykh al-Sadūq
- Muhammad al-Kulaynī
- Allāmah Majlisī
- Shaykh al-Hur al-Āmilī
- Zakaria ibn Idris Ash'ari Qomi
- Ahmad ibn Ishaq Ash'ari Qomi
- List of Shia books
