= Al-Risala al-Dhahabiyya =

Medical dissertation attributed to Ali ibn Musa al-Ridha

- The Golden Treatise
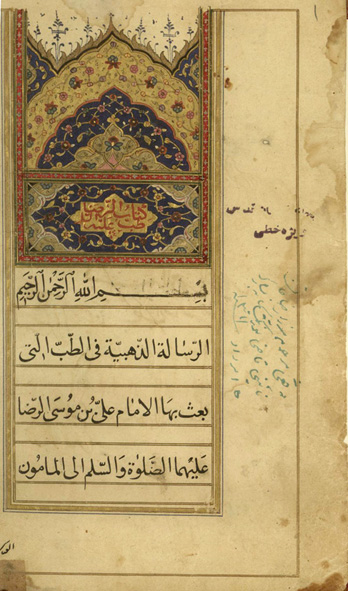
- A page from Al-Risala al-Dhahabiyya, The Golden Treatise.
- Arabic: ٱلرِّسَالَة ٱلذَّهَبِيَّة
- Romanization: Risālah az-Zahabīyah
- Literal meaning: The Golden Treatise

Al-Risala al-Dhahabiyya (Arabic: ٱلرِّسَالَة ٱلذَّهَبِيَّة) or The Golden Treatise, is a medical dissertation on health and remedies attributed to Ali al-Rida, the eighth of the Twelve Imams. It is revered as the most precious Islamic work in the Science of Medicine. Imam Reza wrote this dissertation in accordance with the demand of the Abbasid caliph Ma'mun. Due to its importance, the Imam wrote it in gold ink by order of Ma'mun, and was entitled "The Golden Treatise".

It includes scientific branches such as Anatomy, Histology, Physiology, Chemistry and Pathology when medical science was still primitive. According to the treatise, a person's health is determined by four humors of blood, yellow bile, black bile and phlegm, the suitable proportion of which maintains the health. The liver plays an important role in producing and maintaining the required proportions in the body. Ali al-Rida describes the body as a kingdom whose king is the heart, while the blood vessels, organs, and brain are its workers.

== Author ==
The treatise is authored by Ali al-Rida who was the seventh descendant of the Islamic prophet Muhammad and the eighth of the Twelve Imams. His given name was 'Alī ibn Mūsā ibn Ja'far. He was born in the house of Imam Musa al-Kadhim (the seventh Imam of Twelver Shia Islam) in Medina on the eleventh of Dhu al-Qi'dah, 148 AH (December 29, 765 CE). Ali al-Ridha was summoned to Khurasan and reluctantly accepted the role of successor to Ma'mun that was forced on him. He did not outlive Ma'mun, having been given poisoned grapes by him while accompanying him in Persia, and died at Tus on May 26, 818. Ali al-Ridha is buried within Imam Ridha Mosque, in Mashhad, Iran.

== Background ==
Ma'mun's palace was a center for philosophical and scientific researches in which many scientific seminars were held. One of the mentioned seminars was on man's body which included the greatest scholars and leaders. Ali al-Ridha, Ma'mun, Gabriel b. Bakhtishu (the physician), Masawaiyh (the physician) and Salih ibn Salhama (the Indian philosopher) were some participants of that medical seminar. The participants were involved in a lengthy discussion about the body makeup and various types of foods, while Ali al-Ridha kept silent. Afterwards, Ma'mun asked him to demonstrate his knowledge of physiology and nutrition and Imam replied:

I have of it knowledge of what I have personally tested and came to know about its accuracy by experience and by the passage of time in addition to what I was told by my ancestors of what no body afford to be ignorant of, nor excused for leaving it. I shall compile it with an equal portion of what everyone should know.

Soon after that, Ma'mun departed for Balkh, and wrote to Imam asking him to fulfill his promise and write a treatise on the body and its health, hence Imam authored "The Golden Treatise" at the request of Ma'mun.

== Contents ==
The dissertation of Ali al-Ridha includes scientific branches such as Anatomy, Physiology, Chemistry and Pathology when medical science was still primitive. it begins as follows:

In the Name of Allah, the Most Gracious, the Most Merciful. Know, when Allah tries a servant with a disease, he appoints for him a medicine in order to cure himself with it, and for every kind of disease there is a kind of medicine, conduct, and prescription.

Ali al-Ridha writes in his treatise that one's health is in accordance with the balance of phlegm, yellow bile, blood and black bile; an individual becomes sick when this proportion is unbalanced. Nutrition and traditional medicine may be used to cure imbalances. The liver plays an important role in producing and maintaining the required proportions in the body.

Ali al-Ridha describes the body as a kingdom whose king is the heart while the (blood) vessels, the limbs, and the brain are workers. He then continues as such:

The house of the king is his heart; the body is his land; his hands, his legs, eyes, lips, tongues, and his ears are the helpers; his storekeepers are his stomach; and his chamberlain is his chest. Therefore, the hands are two helpers which bring (things) near, take (them) away, and work as the king reveals to them. The legs are king's vehicle and carry him wherever he likes. The eyes lead the king to that which disappears from him

Imam al-Rida names the main organs of the human body as the heart, the nerves, the brain, the hands and the Legs the ear and the eye. He discusses their characteristics and functions in detail. Regarding the human body containing systems and cells he said:

Do you think that you are a small body, while the greatest world has folded itself in you.

In another part of the treatise, he discusses what kind of foods are suitable according to season, time of the day and the age of an individual. He says:

eat cold (foods) in summer, hot (foods) in winter, and moderate (foods) in the two seasons according to your strength and appetite; and start with the lightest food on which your body feed according to your material, your ability, your activity, and your time in which you must have food every eight hours or three meals every two days...

In other parts, he discusses body disease, months and seasons of the year.

== Reception ==
Ali ibn Musa al-Rida sent his dissertation to Ma'mun who was very pleased to receive it and showed his great interest by ordering that the treatise be written down in gold ink, hence it came to be known as the "Gold Treatise". Ma'mun praised it and said:

I have reviewed the dissertation of my learned cousin, the loved and virtuous one, the logical physician, which deals with the betterment of the body, the conduct of bathing, the balance of nutrition, and I found it very well organized and one of the best blessings. I carefully studied it, reviewed and contemplated upon it, till its wisdom manifested itself to me, and its benefits became obvious, and it found its place in my heart, so I learned it by heart and I understood it by my mind, for I found it to be a most precious item to post, a great treasure, and a most useful item, so I ordered it to be written in gold due to its being precious, and I deposited it at the depository of wisdom after I had it copied down by the descendants of Hashim, the youths of the nation. Bodies become healthy by balanced diets, and life becomes possible by overcoming disease, and through life wisdom is achieved, and through wisdom Paradise is won, and it is worthy of being safeguarded and treasured, and an object of value and esteem and a reliable physician and a counselor to refer to and a substance of knowledge in its injunctions and prohibitions. Because it came out of the house of those who derive their knowledge from the knowledge of the Chosen One (S), the missive of the prophets, the proofs of successors to the prophets, the manners of scholars, the cure to the hearts and the sick from among the people of ignorance and blindness..., may God be pleased with them, bless and be merciful to them, the first of them and the last, the young and the old, I showed it to the elite among my closest train who are known for their wisdom, knowledge of medicine, authors of books, those who are counted among the people of knowledge and described with wisdom, and each one of them lauded it and thought highly of it, elevated it with esteem and appreciated it in order to be fair to its author, submitting to him, believing in the wisdom he included therein.

== Commentaries on the treatise ==
Various commentaries have been written on this dissertation some of which are as follows:

1. Tarjamat al-Alawi lil Tibb al-Radawi by Sayyid Diaud-Din Abul-Rida Fadlallah ibn Ali al-Rawandi (548 AH)
2. Tarjamat al-Dhahabiyya by mawla Faydallah 'Usarah al-Shushtari
3. Tarjamat al-Dhahabiyya by Muhammad Baqir Majlisi. (Available at the private library of the late Sayyid Hassan al-Sadr, Kazimiyya, Iraq)
4. Afiyat al-Bariyya fi Sharh al-Dhahabiyya by Mirza Muhammad Hadi son of Mirza Muhammad Salih al-Shirazi
5. Sharh Tibb al-Rida by mawla Muhammad Sharif al-Khatoonabadi. (around 1120 AH)
6. Tarjamat al-Dhahabiyya by Sayyid Shamsud-Din Muhammad ibn Muhammad Badi' al-Radawi al-Mashhadi.
7. Sharh Tibb al-Rida by mawla Nawrooz Ali al-Bastami.

== See also ==
- Al-Risalah al-Huquq
- Nahj al-Balagha
- Al-Sahifa al-Sajjadiyya
- Al-Sahifat al-Ridha
- List of Shia books
