= Muhammad ibn Ibrahim al-Nu'mani =

Shia Muslim and disciple of Shia Imams al-Sajjad, al-Baqir and al-Sadiq

Muḥammad bin Ibrāhīm al-Nuʿmānī

Personal life
- Born: 10th century
- Main interest(s): Tafsir, Fiqh
- Notable work(s): Kitāb al-Ghayba; Tafsīr al-Nuʿmānī; Kitāb al-Farāʾiḍ; Kitāb al-Radd ʿalā al-Ismāʿīliyya

Religious life
- Religion: Islam
- Denomination: Shia
- Sect: Twelver
- Jurisprudence: Ja'fari

Muslim leader
- Teacher: Muhammad ibn Ya'qub al-Kulayni

Muḥammad ibn Ibrāhīm ibn Jaʿfar al-Nuʿmānī (Arabic: محمد بن إبراهيم بن جعفر النعماني), also known as Ibn Abī Zaynab (إبن أبي زينب), was a 10th-century Shia Muslim scholar. His last name suggest that his family came from al-Nuʿmāniyyah near Baghdad. He was reportedly a disciple of Muhammad ibn Ya'qub al-Kulayni (c. 864–941).

According to Ahmad ibn Ali al-Najashi (c. 982–1058), he wrote several books such as the Kitāb al-Ghayba ('Book of Occultation'), the Kitāb al-Farāʾiḍ ('Book of Commandments'), and the Kitāb al-Radd ʿalā al-Ismāʿīliyya ('Book of Refutation of Isma'ilism'). A tafsir is attributed to him titled Tafsīr al-Nuʿmānī. The commentary is incorporated into the Biḥār al-anwār by the 17th-century author Mohammad-Baqer Majlesi.
