= Mir'at al-Uqul =

Mir'at al-Uqul (Arabic: مرآة العقول lit. The Mirror Of Minds/Intellect) (Full name: Merʾāt al-ʿoqul fi šarḥ aḵbār āl al-rasul: Šarḥ ketāb al-Kāfi le’l-Kolayni) is a hadith commentary of Al-Kafi, one of the four main Shi'a hadith books, that contains hadith gradings and commentary by Shia scholar Mohammad-Baqer Majlesi (d. 1110/1698). It was originally written in Arabic in 25 volumes. The hadith commentary from this book is considered amongst the most important among the Twelver Shi'a community
