= Nahj-al feṣāḥa =

Hadith collection by Abul Qasem Payandeh

Nahj al-Feṣāḥa
- Author: Abul Qasem Payandeh
- Language: Persian, English, Tamil
- Genre: Hadith, History of Islam
- Media type: Printed book

Nahj al-Feṣāḥa: Kalamāt-e-Qeṣār-e-Ḥażrat-e-Rasul (Height of Rhetoric: Aphorisms of the Prophet) (Persian: نهج‌الفصاحه؛ کلمات قصار حضرت رسول) is a book providing narrations and words of Muhammad in ethics and virtues compiled by Abul Qasem Payandeh. The book is called Nahj-al Fasahah after Muhammad's saying: "I am the most eloquent among the Arabs".

== Compiler ==
Abul Qasem Payandeh was an Iranian author and translator, born in 1911 in Najafabad. He studied primary sciences in his birthplace, and continued his studies in Isfahan. In 1942, he went to Tehran and began translating. He published the weekly magazine Saba (until 1951) and was employed in the Iranian academy.

Gradually, he started political activities. In 1949, he was chosen as the deputy for the Islamic conference in Mecca. Payandeh was an expert story teller. Forty of his works survive. His most notable work, is the translation of the Quran which he completed in 1957. Another one of his books, Nahj-al-Feṣāḥa is a compilation of short sermons and sayings that are attributed to Muhammad in 1947. Abul Qasem Payandeh died in 1984.

Works:

- Translation of Murawwej al-Zahab (written by Mas’oudi)
- Translation of Muhammad ibn Jarir al-Tabari history (written by Arab historian)
- Translation of the book Muhammad’s (the Prophet) life (written by Muhammad Hasan Heykal)
- Translation of the book Nahj al-Fasaheh (containing aphorisms of Muhammad)
- Translation of The political history of Islam (Hasan Ibrahim Ayat)
- In embrace of happiness
- In cinema of life (1957)
- Translation of Arab's history (1966)
- The evolution of modern intellect
- Translation of The Islamic civilization (Will Durant)
- The excerpted stories (1946)
- Darkness of justice (1975)

== Subject ==
The author included sayings of Muhammad about virtues and akhlaq and avoided other hadiths in fiqh, etc. On the topic of the book and its accuracy, the author says: "I compiled this collection of the Prophet's (s) sayings through years of studying texts and spent as much of my life as possible on it and even with all my attention, there is any incorrect hadith in it, I would not be worried because I have not related something wrong to the Prophet (s) or quoted any week saying from others and also I might be allowed because this collection is not about [the rulings of] the permissible and the forbidden. It is about the good, virtues and perfection and leaders of the past have always been easy on the chain of the transmitters of such hadiths." Some of the sayings in this collection have been attributed to Imam Ali and in some cases, they are similar in meaning and wording. About such ambiguity of reference, the author says, “there are many cases, when similar sayings and reports related to Imam Ali (a) have been reported from the Prophet (s) which some think it is due to transmitters' mistakes. However, the fact is that the spiritual similarity between Muhammad (s) and Ali (a) has made such a result.”

== Structure ==
This book contains 3,227 hadiths and has two appendices: the first of which includes Muhammad's speeches and the second of which includes metaphorical sayings. The author has also written a lengthy introduction to the book and there has explained his goal for writing the book, of sharing Muhammad's fluency of speech and other topics. The order of hadiths in this book is alphabetical according to the first letter of the first word of hadiths. Later translations and editions have rearranged the hadiths based on their topics.

== Translation ==
The book was also translated to English by Dr. Hosein Vahid Dastjerdi and by Ansariyan Publications in Qom.

== Sources ==
- Payandeh, Abulqasim (2005). revised by Abd al-Rasul Peymani and Muhammad Amin Shari'ati, Khatam al-Anbya (ed.). Nahj al-Fasahah, Collection of sayings and speeches of the noble Prophet (s). Isfahan.
- NAHJ AL-FASAHA, PEAK OF RHETORIC, MAXIMS OF THE HOLY PROPHET, MUHAMMAD (p.b.u.h), ARABIC-ENGLISH, Translator: Dr. Hossein Vahid Dastjerdi, Ansariyan Publications, Qom, 2006

== See also ==
- List of Shia books
