= Sahifah of al-Ridha =

Collection of hadiths attributed to Ali ibn Musa al-Ridha

Sahifah of al-Ridha (Arabic: صَّحِيفَة ٱلرِّضَا, Ṣaḥīfah ar-Riḍā, lit. "Pages of al-Ridha"), also known as Sahifat of al-Reza and Sahifat al-Imam al-Ridha ("Book of Imam al-Ridha"), is a collection of 240 hadiths attributed to Ali al-Rida, the eighth Shia Imam. It is one of the major sources of Shia belief and has attracted the attention of Shia scholars such as Ibn Babawayh and Shaykh Tabarsi. It contains hadiths on various topics including the invocation of God; the importance of praying five times a day and of saying the prayer for the dead; the excellence of the household of Muhammad, of the believer, of good manners, of the names Muhammad and Ahmad, of various foods, fruits, and ointments, of obeying parents, of strengthening the bonds of kinship, and of jihad; a warning against cheating, backbiting, or tattling; and other miscellaneous traditions. The section on Muhammad's household discusses each of its fourteen members separately.

== Chain of authority ==
The book was reportedly first written by Abdallah ibn Aḥmad ibn 'Amer al-Ta'i (d. 324 AH/ 935 CE) (Arabic: عبد الله بن أحمد بن عامر الطائي), who said he had heard its contents from his father Aḥmad ibn 'Amer, who said he had heard them from Ali al-Ridha in Medina in 194 AH (809-10 CE). Abdallah ibn Aḥmad ibn Amer was subsequently recognized as a credible narrator of hadith by Najashi, one of the important Shia scholars.

The version printed in Cairo by al-Ma'ahid Press in the year 1340 AH (1921–1922) begins with the following chain of authorities: Its editor al-'Allāma 'Abd al-Wāsi' stated he received its contents on the authority of Sheikh 'Abd al-Wāsi', who received it from Imam al-Qāsim ibn Mohammed, who received it from Sheikh al-Sayyid Amīr al-Dīn ibn 'Abd Allah, who received it from al-Sayyid Ahmed ibn 'Abd Allah al-Wazīr, who received it from Imam al-Mutahhar ibn Mohammed ibn Sulayman, who received it from Imam al-Mahdi Ahmed ibn Yahya, who received it from Sulayman ibn Ibrahīm ibn 'Umar al-'Alawi, who received it from his father Ibrahīm, who received it from Rida' al-Dīn Ibrahīm ibn Mohammed al-Tabari, who received it from Imam Najm al-Dīn al-Tabrīzi, who received it from al-Hafiz Ibn 'Asakir, who received it from Zahir al-Sinjani, who received it from al-Hafiz al-Bayhaqi, who received it from Abu al-Qasim al-Mufassir, who received it from "Ibrahīm ibn Khu'ra" (by mistake in text "Ju'da"), who received it from Abu al-Qasim 'Abd Allah ibn Ahmed ibn 'Amir al-Ta'i in Basra, who received it from Ali al-Ridha, who claimed his father Musā claimed his father Ja'far claimed his father Muhammad claimed his father 'Ali claimed his father Husayn claimed his father 'Ali, son of Abū Tālib, had heard or witnessed its contents in the company of Muhammad.

== Context ==
The principal narrator of the work was Abdallah ibn Aḥmad ibn Amer, who retells the words of Ali al-Ridha with each entry beginning with a variation of "Through his chain of authorities, he said". (Note: A separate narrator of some of the hadiths of Ali al-Ridha was Abu Abd ar-Rahman as-Sulami who taught them to Abu Bakr Ahmed ibn Nasser ibn Abdallah ibn al-Fath Baghdadi al-Zare' who had participated in the Battle of Nahrawan. A third narrator of these hadiths was Sheikh Saduq. A fourth was Yahya ibn Isma'il who had heard some of these hadiths from his uncle, Hussein ibn Ali Juvayni, by a separate chain of authority.) His father, who was said to have related these words to him, was killed at the Battle of Siffin while supporting Ali. The family were descendants of Wahb ibn Amer who was killed with Husayn at the Battle of Karbala.

Ali al-Ridha was born around 151 AH (768–769) although possibly as late as 159 AH (775–76), to the Imam Musa al-Kadhim and one of his slaves, probably Nubian. His father died in a Baghdadi prison in Rajab, 183 AH (September, 799), during the caliphate of Harun al-Rashid, one of the Abbasid dynasty. Ali al-Ridha succeeded to his father's property but not fully to his title. He began to teach and issue fatwas from the mosque in Medina, where he lived, but the caliphs did not confirm his title and many of his father's trustees withheld their support (and tithes) under the pretense that his father would soon return as the Mahdi. Following Harun's death in 809, a civil war broke out between his sons Al-Amin and Al-Ma'mun. Al-Amin was beheaded in September 813 during the siege of Baghdad but his followers continued their resistance under local governors or in favor of Al-Ma'mun's uncle as late as 827.

The death of Al-Amin permitted Ali al-Ridha greater opportunity to teach. In 200 AH (815–816), Ali al-Ridha was invited or forced by Al-Ma'mun to quit his home and estates in Medina and leave for the imperial capital in Khorasan. Al-Ma'mun proclaimed him as the new Imam throughout the empire upon his arrival at Merv in 201 AH (817). He went further and named Ali al-Ridha as his crown prince and successor to the caliphate. Following the assassination of the imperial vizier and during a relocation of the capital back to Baghdad, Ali al-Ridha died suddenly, most probably on the last day of Safar, 203 AH (September, 818). (Note: Accounts vary, placing it anywhere from Safar, 202 AH (September 817), to Dhu al-Qi'dah, 203 AH (May, 819).) Most sources accuse Al-Ma'mun of having poisoned him.

== Contents ==
[T]he likeness of the believer with Allah is like an angel brought nigh; and the believer with Allah is better than an angel brought nigh; and there is nothing more lovable to Allah than a repentant believing man or a repentant believing woman! — Chapter V (Note: Al-Qarashi (2001), Ch. V, p. 346)

The version printed in Cairo by al-Ma'ahid Press in the year 1340 AH (1921–1922) contained 163 hadiths divided into ten sections, the first nine of which concern particular topics and the last of which includes the remainder on miscellaneous topics. The last section ends with a note that the author "dropped some traditions mentioned in these two books of the Imām", considering them to be fabricated. He further noted that other scholars do not ascribe the book to Ali al-Ridha at all. (Note: Al-Qarashi (2001), Ch. X, p. 366)

The ten sections are:

I: On the Invocation of God
II: On the Call to Prayer
III: On the Mandatory Prayers
IV: On the Excellence of the Household of the Prophet, in 3 parts:

Part One: On the Excellence of Ali bin Abu Talib
Part Two: On the Excellence of Fatima
Part Three: On the Excellence of Hasan and Husayn and the Household in General

V: On the Excellence of Believers, Good Manners, and Those Named Muhammad or Ahmad
VI: On Foods and Ointments
VII: On Filial Obedience and Strengthening Family Ties
VIII: On Avoidance of Cheating and Backbiting
IX: On the Excellence of Jihad, which is not given in full but condensed into a paraphrase (Note: Al-Qarashi (2001), Ch. IX, pp. 360–361)
X: Miscellaneous Hadith

Some hadiths from the Sahifah:

6. Through his chain of authorities, he, peace be on him, said [that Muhammad said]: "The best deeds with Allah are: belief without doubt, invasion without stealing from war booty before it is distributed (ghulul), and proper hajj. The first to enter the Garden will be a martyr; a slave who worships his Lord well and is sincere to his master; and a chaste man who abstains from what is forbidden, has a family, and strives to secure the daily bread of his own family. The first to enter the Fire will be a domineering Imam [or leader] who does not treat with justice; a possessor of wealth of property who does not pay the right against it; and a boastful, poor [person]." (Note: Al-Qarashi (2001), Ch. I, p. 317)

99. Through his chain of authorities, he, peace be on him, said [that Muhammad said]: "The best of the people in faith are the best of them in good manners and the gentlest of them toward their families, and I am the gentlest of you toward my family" (Note: Al-Qarashi (2001), Ch. V, p. 350)

122. Through his chain of authorities, he, peace be on him, said [that Ali, son of Abu Talib, said:] "Gabriel, peace be on him, came to the Prophet, may Allah bless him and his family, and said: 'Cling to al-Barni dates, for it is the best kind of your dates; it brings [men] nigh to Allah and send [them] away from the Fire'". (Note: Al-Qarashi (2001), Ch. VI, p. 356)

123. Through his chain of authorities, he, peace be on him, said [that Husayn ibn Ali said:] "The Commander of the Faithful, peace be on him, ordered us to rinse out mouth three times after we had eaten". (Note: Al-Qarashi (2001), Ch. VI, p. 356)

142. Through his chain of authority, he, peace be on him, said [that Ali ibn Husayn said that Ali, son of Abu Talib, was asked:] "'O Commander of the Faithful, tell me about the excellence of the invasion in the path of Allah.' He, peace be on him, answered: 'I was riding behind Allah's Messenger, may Allah bless him and his family, on his she-camel al-'Adbā' when we came beck from the Campaign of Dhāt al-Salāsil. I asked him about what you have asked me about, and he answered: 'Surely, if the invaders intend to make an invasion, Allah writes for them freedom from the Fire, and if they prepare themselves, Allah vies with the angels through them, etc.'" The tradition is long; the greatest of Messengers, may Allah bless him and his family, has presented therein the excellence of invasion and jihād in the path of Allah, which is one of the gates to the Garden, and which Allah has opened for his special friends, as it was said by the Commander of the Faithful, peace be on him". (Note: Al-Qarashi (2001), Ch. IX, p. 360)

== Manuscripts ==
The following versions are available:

- At the Allameh Amini library, written by Muhammad Ibn Muhammad Ibn Abd al-Qahhar Shirazi, in 761 AH
- At the library of the Grand Mosque in Qom, written by Ridha bin Nizam bin Fakhruddin Hasani Amolie in 848 AH
- At the library of Astan Quds Razavi, written by Ismail bin Abdul Momin Qaany in 881 AH
- At the National Library of the Academy of Rome, narrated by Judge Abu Abdullah Muhammad bin Abdullah bin Hamza bin Abi Najma
- In Egypt. The chain of narrators of this manuscript ends with Al-Bayhaqi.

== See also ==
- Al-Risalah al-Dhahabiah
- Al-Risalah al-Huquq
- Al-Sahifa al-Sajjadiyya
- List of Shia books
