= Khasais of Al Aemmah =

Book is by Sharif Razi

- Author: Sharif Razi
- Language: Persian, English, Arabic
- Genre: hadith, history of Islam
- Publication date: 1406 AH
- Media type: Print book

Khasais Al Aimmah (lit. Characteristics of the Shiite Imams) is a book on sayings and life of Imam Ali the first Imam of Shiite in Islam. The book is written by Sharif Razi or Sayyed Razi. In the book, Sayyed Razi depicts a clear and comprehensive picture of Ali's life.

== Author ==
Abu al-Hasan Muhammad ibn al-Husayn al-Musawi, popularly known as Sayyed or Sharif Razi was born in 359 AH/970 CE in Baghdad and died in 406/1015. He grew up in a sophisticated, religious family. He was trained by Al-Shaykh Al-Mufid, one of the great Shiite jurists. Sayyed Razi is famous for collecting sermons, letters, and sayings attributed to Imam Ali in Nahj al-Balagha.

== Subject ==
The book was supposed to reflect the life of all Shiite Imams but Sayyed Razi ended up dealing only the life and sayings of Imam Ali. The book is highly regarded for its distinguished historical and scholarly importance in the field.

== History ==
The book was probably written about 383 in the Hijri calendar. Sayyed Razi wrote the book when the Abbasid Dynasty was in decline.

== Motive ==
In the book's introduction he mentions his motive for authoring the book. According to Razi, someone had asked him: when he converted to Twelfth Shiite in mockery? Sayyed Razi replied to him and after that he tried to write a book defending Twelve Imam Shiite.

== Style ==
The author collects the sayings and miracles about life of Imam Ali.

== Importance ==
The book has important in many respects, some of them are as follow:

- A valuable source on Imam Ali' life and sayings and also the most referenced book by scholars
- One of the earliest books about Imam Ali
- A preliminary book for writing the Nahj al-Balagha

== Content ==
Some of the contents of book are as follow:

- Characteristics of Imam Ali
- Miracles of Imam Ali
- His knowledge of revelation and how it is revealed
- Fighting the Khawarij, a rebellious Muslim cult
- Omar's descriptions of Ali
