= Eʿteqādātal-Emāmīya =

Book by al-Shaykh al-Saduq

Creeds of Shia or Eʿteqādātal-Emāmīya is one of the most important works of al-Shaykh al-Saduq. It presents a summary of all of the core tenets of the Shi'ite creed.

== Subject ==
More than 200 separate works have been attributed to Ibn Bābawayh, although only a few are now extant. His Risālat al-iʿtiqādāt (Shīʿite Creed, 1942) is important for the study of the doctrinal development of Shīʿah. His works are still widely used wherever Twelver Shīʿī are found. the book include most important beliefs and theological subjects among Shia.

== Features ==
Ebn Bābawayh wrote three creeds: probably his earliest at the beginning of his Hedāya, the Creeds of Shia or Eʿteqādātal-Emāmīya, which is the longest, and another in his Al-Amali (of Shaykh Saduq). He wrote the creeds of Shia in Nishabur city.

== Authenticity ==
As well as other books of sheikh sadouq, Eʿteqādātal-Emāmīya respected by great jurists and theologian. The notification of great jurists and theologians to this book is for the sake of being translational and theological aspects of his works.

== Criticism ==
The book is criticized by Shaykh Al Mofid, the great pupil of al-Shaykh al-Saduq. Shaykh Al Mofid criticized and corrected the opinions of his master all in all in six parts:

- disagreement with holy Qur'an
- disagreement with other Hadith
- documentation of Hadith by reference to Weak Hadith
- incorrect attitudes of Hadith
- affection by other sects but Shia
- disagreement with rules of Arabic language

== Parts ==
This book has 46 titles, as follows:

- Tract on the Beliefs of the Shi'a Imamiya
- The Belief of the Imamiya Concerning Tawhid
- Attributes of (His) Essence and of (His) Actions
- Belief Concerning Taklif (Responsibility)
- The Belief in Respect of Human Actions
- Regarding the Denial of Both Constraint and Delegation
- The Belief Concerning (Allah's) Intention (Irada) and Will (Mashi'a)
- Concerning (qada') Destiny and Decree (qadar)
- Concerning Man's Original Nature (fitra) and His True Guidance (hidaya)
- Belief in the Capacity of Human Beings (al-istita'a)
- Regarding the Source of Creation (mabda' )
- Concerning Abstention From Disputation (jadal) and Contention About Allah (mira')
- Concerning the Tablet (lawh) and the Pen (qalam)
- Regarding the Chair (Kursi)
- Concerning the Throne
- Concerning Souls (nufus) And Spirits (arwah)
- Concerning Death (mawt)
- Concerning the Questioning in the Grave
- Concerning Resurrection (Raj'a)
- Concerning Return (Ba'th) After Death
- Concerning the Pond (al-Hawd)
- Concerning Intersession (ash-shafa'a)
- Concerning the Promise (al-wa`d) and the Threat (al-wa'id)
- Concerning What is Written Against the Slave
- Concerning Justice (al-'adl)
- Concerning Purgatory (al-A'raf)
- Concerning the Bridge (as-Sirat)
- Passes on the Road to Mahshar
- Concerning the Reckoning (al-hisab) and the Scales (al-mawazin)
- Concerning the Garden (al-janna) and the Fire (an-nar)
- The Manner of Descent of Revelation (nuzulu'l-wahy)
- Revelation of the Qur'an in the Night Of Power
- The Belief Concerning the Qur'an
- Concerning the Extent of the Qur'an
- Concerning Prophets Apostles, Imams and Angels
- The Number of Prophets and Vicegerents
- Concerning Infallibility ('isma)
- The Denial of Excess And Delegation
- Belief Concerning Evil Doers
- Concerning Dissimulation (Taqiyya)
- The Ancestors of the Prophet
- Concerning the Alids ('alawiya)
- Concerning Reports Detailed And Summary
- Concerning Prohibition and Permission
- Concerning the Reports Regarding Medicine
- Concerning Two Divergent Traditions

== Selected part ==
He says about the Manner Of Descent Of Revelation (nuzulu'l-wahy) Says the Shaykh Abu Ja'far: Our belief concerning this is that there is a tablet between the two eyes of Israfil. Whenever Allah wishes to speak by way of revelation, the Tablet comes in contact with the forehead of Israfil, then he looks into it and reads what is in it. Israfil would then convey it to Mika'il and he in turn would convey it to Gabriel, and the angel Gabriel, would convey it to the prophets, on whom be peace.

And as for the fainting fit which would come upon the Prophet, it used to take place at the time of Allah's addressing him by reason whereof he would also feel a heaviness and perspire. But Gabriel, on account of respect for the Prophet, would never enter his presence until he sought permission, and he used to sit before him (the Prophet) in the manner of a slave.

== See also ==
- Al-Majdi fi Ansab al-Talibiyyin
