= Risalat al-Huquq =

Work attributed to Ali al-Sajjad

Treatise of Rights
- Author: Ali al-Sajjad
- Original title: Risalat al-Huquq (رسالة الحقوق)
- Language: Arabic
- Published: Seventh century CE (first century AH)

Risalat al-Huquq (Arabic: رسالة الحقوق, lit. 'treatise of rights') is an early Islamic text about social and religious responsibilities. The book is attributed to Ali al-Sajjad (d. c. 712 CE), an imam in Shia Islam, and the great-grandson of the Islamic prophet, Muhammad. Risalat al-Huquq exhaustively describes the rights God has upon humans and the rights humans have upon themselves and on each other, as perceived in Islam. Risalat al-Huquq has been related by Abu Hamza al-Thumali, a close confidant of al-Sajjad.

== About the author ==
Risalat al-Huquq (lit. 'treatise on rights') is attributed to Ali al-Sajjad (d. c. 712 CE), probably written at the request of a disciple. Also known by the honorific title Zayn al-Abidin (lit. 'ornament of worshippers'), al-Sajjad was an imam in Shia Islam and the great-grandson of the Islamic prophet, Muhammad.

== About the book ==
Risalat al-Huquq is concerned with social and religious responsibilities. It exhaustively lists the rights God has upon humans and the rights humans have upon themselves and on each other, as perceived in Islam. The book describes the social duties each human must observe, and that those duties predicate on more fundamental ones, such as faith in God and obedience to Him.

Risalat al-Huquq has been viewed as an elaboration of Muhammad's saying, "Surely your Lord has a right against you, your self has a right against you, your wife has a right against you." Some versions of this well-attested hadith, possibly uttered on other occasions, include other rights and the clause, "So give everyone who possesses a right his right." What is meant by "everyone who possesses a right" is exhaustively detailed in Risalat al-Huquq by al-Sajjad, who bases himself in the Quran and hadith literature.

Risalat al-Huquq has been translated as Treatise of Rights, because the word huquq (Arabic: حقوق) in the title is the plural for haqq (Arabic: حق), which is often translated as 'right', although other closely related words are 'justice', 'truth', 'obligation', 'duty', and 'responsibility'. These latter translations might have been more appropriate because Risalat al-Huquq is primarily concerned with the rights of others which the individual must observe, in sharp contrast with Western views where human rights are often interpreted as the rights of the individual. In Islam, however, the only true right of the individual is that of salvation, to attain which the individual must follow the guidance of God. Without this divine guidance, Islam teaches, the individual is unable to perceive his best interests in the midst of his own ego and self-centered desires.

Risalat al-Huquq has been related by Abu Hamza al-Thumali, a close confidant of al-Sajjad. There are two recensions of the book, one of which appears in al-Khisal and al-Amali, authored by the Shia scholar Shaykh al-Saduq (d. 991). Another version is included in Tuhaf al-Uqul, authored by Ibn Shu'ba, a contemporary of al-Saduq. This second version contains clarifications, perhaps added later to the original text.

== Contents ==
Risalat al-Huquq begins with an introduction that briefly overviews the rights and begins as

Know–God have mercy upon you–that God has rights incumbent upon you and that these encompass you in every motion through which you move, every rest which you take, every way station in which you reside, every limb which you employ, and every instrument which you use. Some of these rights are greater than others.

The introduction is followed by a detailed statement of the rights, some of which are listed below.

=== Rights of God ===
The greatest right of God against you is that you worship Him without associating anything with Him. When you do that with sincerity (ikhlas), He has made it binding upon Himself to give you sufficiency in the affair of this world and the next.

=== Rights of yourself and your body organs ===
- Right of your tongue
- Right of your hearing
- Right of your sight
- Right of your legs
- Right of your hands
- Right of your stomach
- Right of your private parts

=== Rights of deeds ===
- Right of your ritual prayer
- Right of fasting
- Right of the pilgrimage
- Right of the charity (sadaqa)
- Right of the offering (hady)

=== Rights of leaders ===
- Right of the possessor of authority
- Right of him who trains you through knowledge
- Right of him who trains you through ownership

=== Rights of subjects ===
- Right of your subjects through authority
- Right of your subjects through knowledge
- Right of your wife
- Right of your slave

=== Rights of womb relatives ===
- Right of your mother
- Right of your father
- Right of your child
- Right of your brother

=== Rights of others ===
- Right of your master
- Right of your freed slave
- Right of the one who treats you kindly
- Right of the caller to prayer
- Right of the ritual prayer leader
- Right of your sitting companion
- Right of your neighbor
- Right of your companion
- Right of your partner
- Right of your property
- Right of the creditor
- Right of your associate
- Right of your adversary
- Right of him who seeks your advice
- Right of him whose advice you seek
- Right of him who seeks your counsel
- Right of your counselor
- Right of the older one
- Right of the younger one
- Right of him who asks you (sa'il)
- Right of whom you ask
- Right of him through whom God makes you happy
- Right of him who wrongs you
- Right of people of your creed
- Right of those under the protection of Islam

== Treatise of Life ==
The documentary Treatise of Life is about the lifestyle mindful of the rights listed in Risalat al-Huquq. It was directed by Amir Farrokh Saber, an Iranian director, and broadcast on the IRIB news channel.

== See also ==
- Al-Sahifa al-sajjadiyya
- List of Shia books

== Sources ==
- Ali al-Sajjad (1987). "The Treatise on Rights: Risālat al-Huqūq". The Psalms of Islam (As-sahifa Al-kamilah Al-sajjadiyya). The Muhammadi Trust of Great Britain and Northern Ireland. ISBN 094607951X.
- Baghestani, I.; Emadi Haeri, M. (2017). "سجاد, امام" [Sajjad, Imam]. Encyclopaedia of the World of Islam (in Persian). Vol. 23.
- Chittick, W. C. (1987). "Translator's Introduction". The Psalms of Islam (As-sahifa Al-kamilah Al-sajjadiyya). The Muhammadi Trust of Great Britain and Northern Ireland. ISBN 094607951X.
- Kohlberg, E. (2012). "Zayn al-'Ābidīn". In Bearman, P.; Bianquis, Th.; Bosworth, C. E.; van Donzel, E.; Heinrichs, W. P. (eds.). Encyclopaedia of Islam (Second ed.). doi:10.1163/1573-3912_islam_SIM_8144. ISBN 9789004161214.
- Madelung, W. (1985). "'Alī b. Ḥosayn b. 'Alī b. Abī Ṭāleb". Encyclopaedia Iranica. Vol. I/8. pp. 849–850. ISSN 2330-4804.
