= Majalis al-muminin =

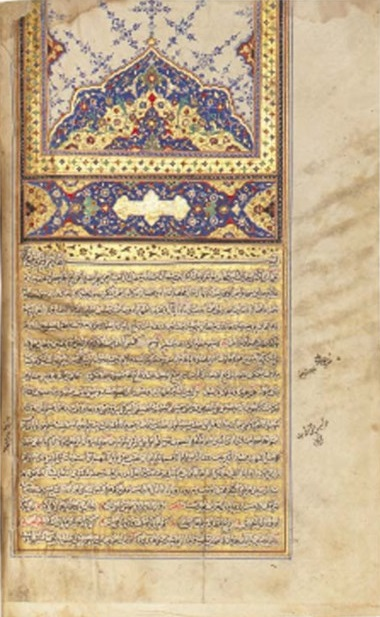
Majalis al-mu'minin (The Assemblies of Believers), Safavid Iran, AH 1043 i.e. 1633-4 AD

Majalis al Mo'minin (Persian:مجالس المومنین) is a book with biographies and works of Shia Islam scholars such as followers of the Twelve Imams, theologians and philosophers. This book is also about Shia Islam theological subjects.

== Author ==
Qazi Noorullah Shustari (1542-1610/11) also known as Shaheed-e-Salis (third martyr) was an eminent Shia Faqīh (jurist) and alim (scholar) of the Mughal period, in India. He may also have served as the Qazi-ul-Quzaa during the reign of Akbar the Great.

== Majalis ==
This book is considered an important biographical work in which there is much information about notable persons who were Shia. Qazi Noorollah divided the book into twelve Majlis or sections. The fifth section was concerned with the lives of lawyers and traditionalists. Qazi Noorollah does not mention the period of writing the book. Maybe the book was written in the first part of the eleventh century of the Hijrah.

Mirza Abdullah Afandi said the motive of writing the book was to deny belief in the appearance of Shia Islam in the Safavid dynasty. Afandi also said the book was written between the first day of Rajab and 23 Dhu al-Qadah in 1010 Hijrah lunar.

== See also ==
- Al-Majdi fi Ansab al-Talibiyyin
