= Kashf al-Ghumma =

Book written by Ali b. Isa al-Irbili

Kashf al-ghumma fi ma'rifat al-a'imma is a book written in the 13th century by Ali ibn Isa al-Irbili, a Shi'a scholar, about the family of Muhammad.

== See also ==
- Umdat al-Talib
