= Muhammad al-Tijani =

Tunisian Shia Scholar

Sheikh Muhammad al-Tijani
- محمد التيجاني
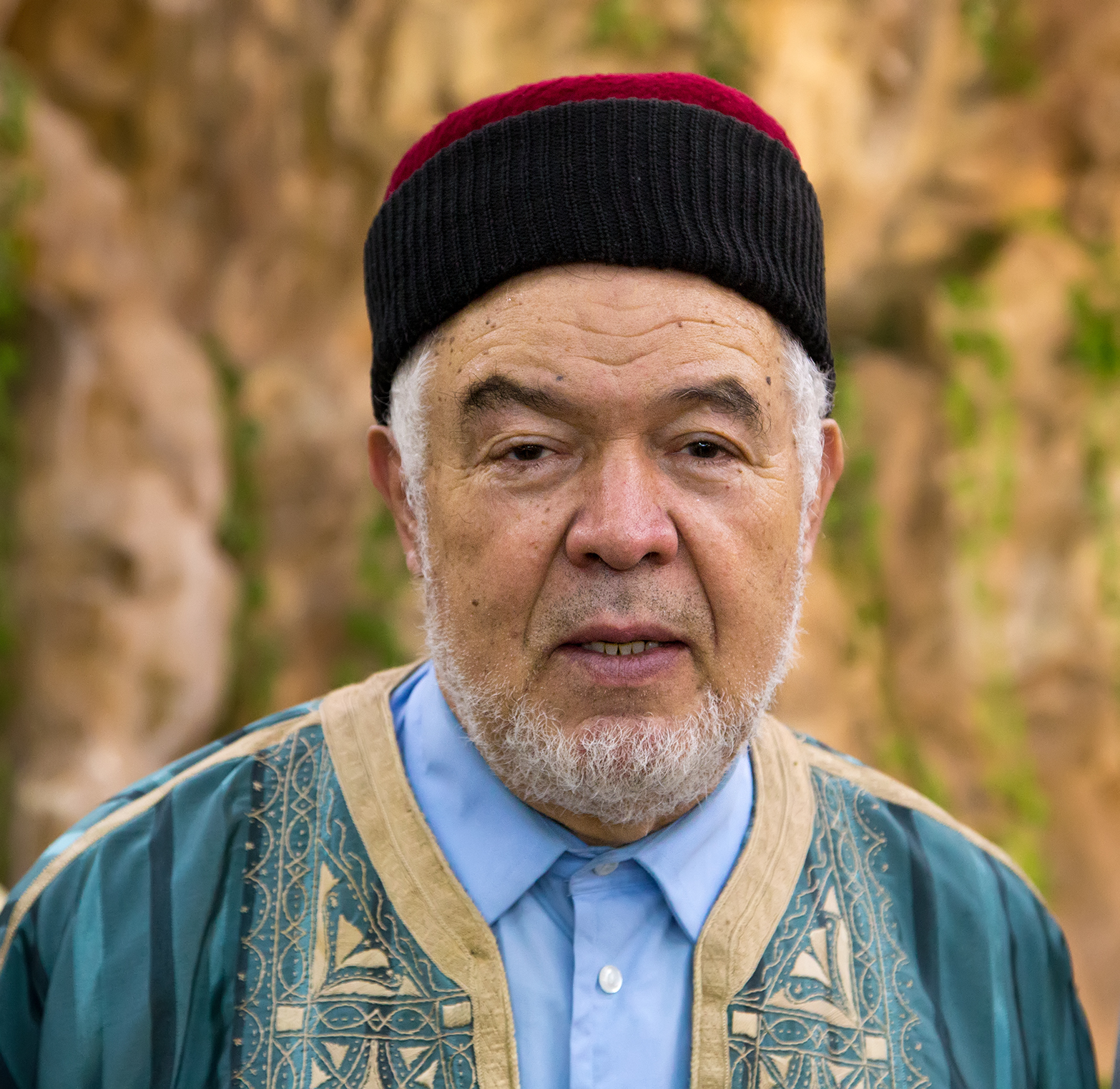

Personal life
- Born: 2 February 1943 (age 83) Gafsa, French protectorate of Tunisia
- Era: Modern era
- Region: North Africa

Religious life
- Religion: Islam
- Denomination: Shia
- Creed: Usuli Twelver Shi'a

Muslim leader
- Influenced by: Muhammad Baqir al-Sadr, Abu al-Qasim al-Khoei, Muhammad Husayn Tabataba'i

Muhammad al-Tijani (Arabic: محمد التيجاني, romanized: Muḥammad al-Tījānī; born 2 February 1943) is a Tunisian Islamic scholar, academic, and theologian. He converted from Sunni Islam to Twelver Shi'a Islam.

== Personal life ==
Al-Tijani was born in a Tunisian Sunni Muslim family of the Maliki school. Previously, his family added “al-Tijani” to their name after adopting the Tijani sufi order of Ahmad al-Tijani. He was eighteen years of age when the Les Scouts Tunisiens agreed to send him as one of six Tunisian representatives to the first conference for Islamic and Arab scouts which took place in Mecca. He used the opportunity to perform the Hajj. He stayed twenty five days in Saudi Arabia, during which he met many prominent Salafi scholars, listened to their lectures and became heavily influenced by the Salafi movement.

Upon returning to Tunisia, al-Tijani started actively promoting and spreading Salafism during the religious classes and sermons that he gave, including in the Great Mosque of Kairouan. He then traveled to Egypt’s al-Azhar University. On the way back to Tunisia, al-Tijani met a Shi'i Iraqi lecturer from the University of Baghdad named Mun'im. He came to Cairo to submit his Ph.D. thesis at al-Azhar University and Mun'im invited him to Iraq. Al-Tijani spent several weeks with Mun'im; visited Baghdad and Najaf, and met with several leading Twelver Shi'i scholars, including Abu al-Qasim al-Khoei, Muhammad Baqir al-Sadr, and Muhammad Husayn Tabataba'i, who taught him about Shi'a Islam. After long debates with the Shi'i scholars, he became a Shi'a Muslim.

== Works ==
Al-Tijani's books are banned in some countries, such as Saudi Arabia and Malaysia. He has written six books:

- Then I Was Guided (here at al-islam.org)
- Ask Those Who Know (here at al-islam.org)
- To Be with the Truthful (here at al-islam.org)
- The Shi'ah are the real Ahlul-Sunnah (here at al-islam.org), approx. 'The Shi'a are the real followers of the Sunnah'
- All Solutions Are with the Prophet's Progeny (here at al-islam.org)
- Black Thursday (here at al-islam.org)
