= Tafsir Numani =

- Author: Muhammad Ibn Ibrahim Ibn Jafar al-Numani
- Original title: تفسير النُعماني
- Language: Arabic
- Subject: Quranic exegesis
- Genre: Religious
- Media type: Print

Tafsir Numani is an exegesis on the Quran attributed to Muhammad Ibn Ibrahim Ibn Jafar al-Numani. The commentary is incorporated into Bihar al-anwar by Majlisi. The book does not include a continuous commentary on all the verses of the suras. It resembles an introduction to another Tafsir such as Tafsir Qomi. Tafsir Numani is a series of traditions from Muhammad transmitted by Ali in order for Muhammad to clarify for Ali important issues about the form and content of the Quran. The book divides verses into categories such as al-nasikh wa l-mansukh (abrogating and abrogated), al-khass wa l-amm (general and specific), al-rukhas min al-azaim (concessions concerning stringencies), al-makki wa l-madani (Meccan and Medinan), ma fihi min ilm al-qada wa l-qadar (destiny and pre-destination), ma huwa baqi muharraf ani jihatihi (which have remained falsified) and ma huwa ala khailaf tanzilihi (that are different from the way they were revealed). The significance of this work is in that it depicts verses based on which the Shia set its doctrines in the interpretation of various issues.
