= Who Is Muhammad? =

Book by Ja'far Sobhani

- Author: Ja'far Sobhani
- Language: English
- Subject: History of Islam
- Published: 2013 Tahrike Tarsile Qur'an
- Media type: Book
- ISBN: 978-0940368101

Who Is Muhammad? or The Message (Persian: فروغ ابدیت) is the biography of the Islamic prophet written by Islamic scholar Ja'far Sobhani.

The book was originally written in the Persian language and has been translated to English.

== Overview ==
The book gives a comparison between the diverse attitudes. It not only speaks about the life of Muhammad but also discusses the diverse attitudes.

== Translations ==
Sobhani wrote his work in Persian. It has since been translated to languages including English, Urdu, Bengali, Arabic (Arabic: سيد المرسلين, And also the book was summarized in a book of السيرة المحمدية), Turkish and French.

In 2013 Tahrike Tarsile Qur'an published an abridged English translation.

== Awards ==
The book won the 2006 Iran's Book of the Year Awards in the History of Islam category.
