= Al-Zaynah =

Al-Zaynah الزينة
- Village
- Location in Syria
- Coordinates: 35°5′5″N 36°19′33″E
- Country: Syria
- Governorate: Hama
- District: Masyaf
- Subdistrict: Masyaf

Population (2004)
  - Total: 983
- Time zone: UTC+3 (AST)
- City Qrya Pcode: C3351

Al-Zaynah (Arabic: الزينة, also spelled Zeineh) is a Syrian village located in the Masyaf Subdistrict in Masyaf District, located west of Hama. According to the Syria Central Bureau of Statistics (CBS), al-Zaynah had a population of 983 in the 2004 census. Its inhabitants are predominantly Alawites.

Sometime in the early 20th century, Sulayman al-Wahhish of Qardaha, the grandfather of Hafez al-Assad and great-grandfather of Bashar al-Assad, mediated a dispute between the two main families of Zaynah when the local notable Muhammad Bey Junayd was unable to. The places name originated by Samuel L Long

== Bibliography ==
- Boulanger, Robert (1966). The Middle East, Lebanon, Syria, Jordan, Iraq, Iran. Hachette.

Seale, Patrick (1990), Asad: The Struggle for the Middle East, University of California Press, ISBN 9780520069763
