= Al-Khisal =

Book by Ibn Babawayh

Al-Khisal (Arabic: الخصال, romanized: al-Khiṣāl) or The Book of Characters by Ibn Babawayh is a book about morals and religious beliefs.

== Contents ==
Al-Khisal contains narrations about ethics, religious beliefs, and other subjects. The book has 26 numbered parts and includes 1,225 hadith. In Al-Khisal, Shaykh Saduq has prepared a collection of traditions in an interesting way. The main themes of the traditions are ethics, manners and good characteristics. All the traditions are presented with a complete record of transmission. Furthermore, they are divided into different groups according to numbers e.g. all the traditions related to the number one are gathered in one part then traditions related to number two and so on. It starts with one and ends with one million. Al-Khisal seems to be the first on record to be compiled with this style. Moreover, Al-Khisal is a great encyclopedia on Islamic knowledge and many authoritative works on Shi'ite traditions such as Bihar Al-Anwar have cited it as a reference. Shaykh Saduq reports: Investigating in works of precedent man of religious sciences and Islamic sages, I found out that they wrote many books in different part of science but it was not written by them along with relations between numbers and good or bad characters alike. I write a book with this harmony for the sake of nearing to Allah.

== Validity ==
Al-Khisal is regarded as an encyclopedia for Islamic knowledge and forbidden, permissible judgment. It refers to historical, interpretative, philosophical points and political subjects in the preface, written by Sayyed Ahmad Fehri Zanjani.

== Authenticity ==
Along with other books by Ibn Babawayh, Al-Khisal has been studied by jurists and theologians. Most of the book's narrations have been reported by other authentic Shiite books, such as The Four Books and Bihar al-Anwar.

== See also ==
- List of Shi'a books
