= Al Saqib Fi al-Manâqib =

Book by Ibn Hamzeh Tousi

- Author: Ibn Hamzeh Tousi
- Language: Arabic
- Genre: hadith, history of Islam
- Publication date: 1412 lunar
- Media type: Print book

Al Saqib Fi al-Manâqib is a book on the miracles of Muhammad, other prophets, and Shiite imams. It has also been called Saqib Al Manaqib. The book was written by Ibn Hamzeh Tousi, also known as Emad al Din Tousi, an Imami jurist in the sixth year of Hijrah.

== Content ==
The book has fifteen chapters. The first focuses on Muhammad's miracles, while following chapters look at Ali, Fatimah, and Hasan Ibn Ali's miracles.

The text focuses only on miracles and wonderworks (Karamat), rather than the figures' biographies. Included miracles include speaking with animals, knowledge to Absent Things, and an instance when Hasan Ibn Ali was able to change the sexuality of a man and a woman.

=== Sources ===
Some sections of the text draw from other books, including:

- Bosatan Al Kiram by Muhammad Ibn Ahmad Ibn Shazan Qommi
- Mafakhir Al Riza by Hakem Neishabouri
- Helyat Al Oliyya by Hafiz Abu Naeem Isfahani
- Fazael Al Batoul by abu Mousa
- Siyyar Al Aemmah (destinies of Imams) by Moulini
