= Al-Hurr al-Amili =

Shiite Muslim cleric and scholar (1624–1693)

Coordinates: 36°17′17″N 59°37′01″E

Personal life
- Born: 1624 Machghara, Ottoman Empire (modern-day Lebanon)
- Died: 1693 (aged 68–69) Mashhad, Safavid Iran
- Buried: Imam Reza shrine

Religious life
- Religion: Islam
- Denomination: Shia
- Jurisprudence: Ja'fari
- Creed: Twelver

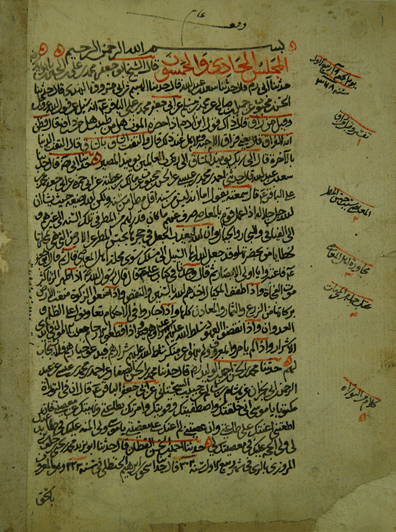
A manuscript attributed to al-Hurr al-Amili

Muḥammad bin al-Ḥasan bin ʿAlī bin al-Ḥusayn al-Ḥurr al-ʿĀmilī al-Mashgharī (Arabic: مُحَمَّد ٱبْن ٱلْحَسَن ٱبْن عَلِيّ ٱبْن ٱلْحُسَيْن ٱلْحُرّ ٱلْعَامِلِيّ ٱلْمَشْغَرِيّ; 1033/1624 - 1104/1693), commonly known as Al-Ḥurr Al-ʿĀmilī (ٱلْحُرّ ٱلْعَامِلِيّ), was a prominent Twelver Shia scholar, muhaddith, and poet. He is best known for his comprehensive hadith compilation known as Wasa'il al-Shia (also known as Wasa’il ush-Shi’a) and as the second of the “Three Great Muhammads” in later Shi’a Islamic history.

== Biography ==
=== Early life and education ===
He was born on Friday, 8th of Raj̲ab 1033AH/26 April 1624 CE in the Western Beqaa village of Machghara in the ʿĀmil mountains of Lebanon, a center of Shi’i Lebanese in the region, to Al-Hurr family descended from Al-Hurr ibn Yazid al-Riyahi al-Tamimi. His early education began with a family of teachers that included his father, his paternal uncle, his maternal grandfather (Shaykh ʿAbd Salām b. Muḥammad), and one of his father's maternal uncles (shaykh ʿAlī b. Maḥmūd; at Ḏj̲abʿ). He also studied under Ḥusayn b. Hasan b. Yunus Ẓahīr and Ḥasan b. Zayn al-Dīn ʿĀmili (d.1011/1602), who was the great-grandson of al-Shahid al-Thani, in al-Jaba, a nearby village. Ḥusayn Zahir was the first to give al-Ḥurr al-ʿĀmili ijaza, a license to teach and transmit ahadeeth.

=== Later life and travels ===
Al-Ḥurr Al-ʿĀmili performed the hajj twice and went on ziyarat, visiting of holy Shi’a shrines, in Iraq. Other than these trips, he remained in the Jabal ʿĀmil for the first forty years of his life. He lived during the era of the Safavid Empire, which at the time was pushing Imami Shi’ism upon the people of Iran. When Sunni ulama fled from the Safavid Empire, specifically the religious centers of Iran, the empire brought in many Shi’i scholars to replace them, a large amount coming from Jabal ʿĀmil.

Al-Ḥurr Al-ʿĀmili was one of the many scholars that migrated to take religious leadership positions in Iran at the time, eventually journeying to Mashhad, Iran and settling there in 1073/1663 where he became Shaykh al-Islam in the shrine of the 8th Imam, Ali al-Ridha. He settled after traveling first to Isfahan, Persia where he became acquainted with Muhammad Baqir Majlisi, the third of the Great Muḥammads (the first of the Three Great Muḥammads of later centuries is Muhammad Kashani, also known as Muhsin al-Fayz). The meeting between these two scholars left an impression on them both and they mutually granted each other ijāza to transmit hadiths. Majlisi also introduced al-ʿĀmili to Shah Sulayman of the Safavid Empire.

Al-ʿĀmili died in Mashhad on the 21st of Ramadhan 1104 AH / 26 May 1693 CE and is buried there. He was succeeded by his brother Ahmad (d. 1120/1708-9) as shaykh al-Islam in Mashhad. Some have claimed that al-Ḥurr al-ʿĀmili actually died in Yemen in 1079/1669, but there is no evidence in support of this.

Al-Ḥurr al-ʿĀmili was not only known as a scholar, but also as a poet. He is credited with a diwān of approximately 20,000 verses, which includes several didactic poems (manẓumas), most of which constitute panegyrics to the Prophet Muḥammad and to his descendants. However, in two verses, he also expressed his inner struggle between his poetic and scholarly leanings: “My scholarship and my poetry fought one another, then were reconciled / poetry reluctantly surrendering to scholarship” (ʿelmi wa-šeʿri qatalā wa-ṣṭalaḥā / fa-ḵażaʿa al-šeʿro le-ʿelmi rāḡemā); “My scholarship objected to my being considered a poet / poetry, however, conceded that I be regarded as a scholar” (fa-l-ʿelmo yaʾbā an oʿadda šāʿeran / wa’l-šeʿro yarżā an oʿadda ʿālemā).

== Works ==
1. Wasā'il al-Shīʿa: a vast but concise compilation and classification of Hadith based on the Four Books (al-Kafī, Man La Yahduruhu al-Faqih, al-Taththib, al-Istibrar) as well as on many later sources. It took 18 years to compose.
2. al-Jawāher al-saniya fī al-aḥādith al-qudsiya: considered the first collection exclusively devoted to Sacred Hadith, or aḥādith qudsiya.
3. Isbāt al-Hudāt bin al-Noṣuṣ wa al-Muʿjizāt: describes the miracles of the 12 Imams and deals with the question of the divine right of the Imams to rule
4. Risala fī Tawatur al-Qur'an
5. Risala fī Mas'ala al-Rija't
6. Risala fī Khalq al-Kafir
7. Risala ithnā ʿashariya fī al-radd ʿalā al-ṣufiya : an anti-Sufi treatise representing much of his literary activities regarding them.
8. Fawaid al-Toosiya: a rejection of Usoolism - Translated in English by Sayyed Athar Husain Rizvi
9. Amal al-āmil fī ʿulamāʾ jabal ʿāmil: a biographical dictionary of Twelver Shi’i scholars who originated from jabal ʿĀmil in southern Lebanon.

=== Students ===
1. Allamah Mohammad Baqir Majlisi (writer of Bahar al-anwar)
2. Sheikh Mostafa Hoveizy
3. Seyed Mohammad Hosseiny A'raji
4. Seyed Mohammad Bady'
5. Seyed Mohammad Moosavi Aamely
6. Mola Mohammad Taghi Abd al-Wahhab
7. Mohaddes Mola Mohammad Saleh Heravi
8. Mola Hassan ebn Mohammad Taher Ghazviny Taleghani
9. Mohammad Meymandi
10. Seyed Mohammad ibn Zein al-Abedin Moosavi Aameli
11. Sheikh Aboo al-Hassan ibn Mohammad al-Nabati al-Aameli
12. Nur al-Din Nimatullah al-Jazayiri

== See also ==
- Shia Islam
- Wasael ush-Shia
- Akhbari
- List of Shi'a Muslim scholars of Islam
- List of maraji
- List of Shi'a books
- The Four Books
- Sayyid Murtadhā
- Al-Sharif al-Radi
- Shaykh al-Mufīd
- Shaykh al-Tūsī
- Shaykh al-Sadūq
- Muhammad al-Kulaynī
- Allāmah Majlisī
