= Al-Sahifa al-Sajjadiyya =

Book by Ali al-Sajjad

Al-Sahifa al-Sajjadiyya ٱلصَّحِيفَة ٱلسَّجَّادِيَّة
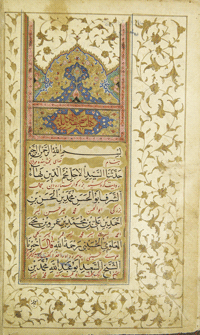
- Author: Ali al-Sajjad (c. 659–713)
- Language: Arabic
- Published: 7th Century CE; 1st Century AH

Al-Sahifa al-Sajjadiyya (Arabic: ٱلصَّحِيفَة ٱلسَّجَّادِيَّة, romanized: Al-Ṣaḥīfa al-Sajjādiyya, lit. 'the scripture of al-Sajjad') is a book of supplications attributed to Ali al-Sajjad (c. 659–713), the fourth imam in Shia Islam, and the great-grandson of the Islamic prophet, Muhammad. The oldest prayer manual in Islam, al-Sahifa has been praised as the epitome of Islamic spirituality and the answer to many of today's spiritual questions. In particular, Shia tradition holds the book in great esteem, ranking it behind the Quran, the central religious text of Islam, and Nahj al-Balagha, which is attributed to the fourth Caliph and first Shia imam, Ali ibn Abi Talib. 54 supplications form the core of al-Sahifa, which often also includes an addenda of 14 supplications and 15 whispered prayers (munajat).

== About the book ==
Al-Sahifa al-Sajjadiyya (lit. 'the scripture of al-Sajjad') is a collection of supplications. Regarded as a seminal work in Islamic spirituality, al-Sahifa has been praised as the epitome of Islamic spiritual expression and as a source of guidance for many contemporary spiritual questions. The book is attributed to Ali al-Sajjad, the great-grandson of the Islamic prophet Muhammad and an imam in Shia Islam, also known by the honorific title Zayn al-Abidin (lit. 'ornament of worshippers'). Within Shia tradition, al-Sahifa is held in great esteem, ranking immediately after the Quran—the central text of Islam—and Nahj al-balagha, attributed to Ali ibn Abi Talib, the first Shia imam and grandfather of al-Sajjad. The book is also known by several honorific titles, including “Sister of the Quran,” “Gospel of the Holy Household,” and “Psalms of Muhammad's Household.” It is additionally revered by certain Sufi orders. Numerous commentaries have been written on al-Sahifa.

Supplication refers to addressing God with praise, thanksgiving, hopes, and needs. Muslims often recite the supplications transmitted by their religious authorities—beginning with Muhammad and, for the Shia, continuing with their imams. Al-Sajjad likely composed al-Sahifa with the wider Muslim community in mind. The work includes prayers for communal occasions such as Eid al-Fitr, as well as a supplication for parents in which al-Sajjad speaks as though his parents were still alive.

Al-Sahifa may be viewed as a practical expression of the essential Islamic testimony of faith, the shahadah—that “there is no god but God,” meaning that God is everything and the human being is nothing without Him. Among its central themes are “There is no goodness but in God,” “There is no patience without God's help,” and “There is no gratitude except through God,” along with their complementary acknowledgements: “There is no evil but in me,” “There is no impatience but in my own ego,” and “There is no hate but in myself.” Once the worshipper admits his own shortcomings and sinfulness, he can humble himself before God and seek His generosity and forgiveness.

=== Predominance of mercy ===
Al-Sahifa has been likened to a mosaic in which each element corresponds to a component of the Quranic text. In particular, the predominance of divine mercy in the Quran is reflected throughout al-Sahifa, where al-Sajjad repeatedly seeks refuge in God's mercy and emphasizes its precedence over His wrath. He thus frequently asks God for forgiveness in al-Sahifa—as did Muhammad in his prayers—even though both figures are regarded as infallible in Shia Islam. Both likely repented with utmost sincerity, but their “sins” were not acts of deliberate disobedience. Instead, they repeatedly asked God to conceal (istighfar) their human limitations. The emphasis in al-Sahifa on God's mercy also mirrors the attitude of its author, al-Sajjad, who is reported to have said, “It is only strange if a person perishes as he perishes, given the scope of God's mercy.” This posture resembles that of Muhammad, who taught that a worshipper “should be firm and make his desire great, for what God gives is nothing great for Him.” At the same time, awareness of God's wrath is maintained, since hope in divine mercy must be coupled with “refraining from arrogance, pulling aside from persistence [in sin], and holding fast to praying [for] forgiveness,” as stated in passage 12:13 of al-Sahifa.

=== Other dimensions ===
In al-Sahifa, al-Sajjad sometimes alludes to the injustices suffered by Muhammad's household, the Ahl al-Bayt. There are also cases in the book where al-Sajjad prays for the Muslim community (umma) and the rectification of their affairs, as well as soldiers guarding Muslim frontiers. Al-Sahifa might have initially been a sectarian booklet for the Shia. For instance, salutations to Muhammad and his family frequently appear in the book in defiance of Umayyad policies. In some supplications, al-Sajjad refers to imamate, a central tenet of Shia Islam.

Besides its spiritual dimension, al-Sahifa is also a source of Islamic teachings. Its prayer, "Blessing Upon the Bearers of the Throne," for instance, summarizes Islamic views about angels.

== Authenticity ==
The attribution of al-Sahifa to al-Sajjad is often regarded as authentic, although parts of the books may have been artistically edited by others. In Shia tradition, the text is regarded as mutawatir, that is, handed down by numerous chains of transmission. The addenda were collected by the prominent Shia scholar Muhammad ibn Makki (d. 1385), while the munajat were popularized by Muhammad-Baqir Majlisi (d. c.1699), another leading Shia scholar.

== Translations ==
Al-Sahifa was translated into Persian during the Safavid era. An English translation of the book, entitled The Psalms of Islam, is also available with an introduction and annotations by the Islamicist W.C. Chittick.

== Other collections ==
In addition to al-Sahifa, there are other collections of prayers attributed to al-Sajjad. The second al-Sahifa was compiled in 1643 by al-Hurr al-Amili, a renowned Shia scholar. The third al-Sahifa was collected by Afandi, a student of Majlisi. The fifth al-Sahifa by Muhsin al-Amin, a well-known contemporary Shia scholar, is the longest such collection and subsumes all other collections.

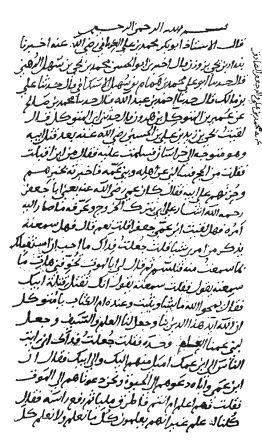
Oldest document from al-Sahifah al-Sajjadiyyah

== Passages ==
- And the heavens and their canopies praise Him, and the earth and its embroideries, and the mountains and their heights, and trees and their branches, and the seas and their monsters, and the stars in their rising, and the rains in their falling, and the wild beasts of the earth in their preying and their dens, and the fullness of the rivers and their ripples, and the sweetness and brackishness of waters, and the blasts of the winds and their roaring, and everything that may be described or heard.
- My worn mortal face is prostrate before Thine ever lasting, ever abiding Face. My face is prostrate, dust-soiled, before its Creator, and meet and right is this prostration. My face is prostrate before Him who created and formed it and pierced for it (the openings of) hearing and sight. Blessed be God, the Best of Creators. My miserable and lowly face is prostrate before the Mighty, the Glorious.
- My God, were it not incumbent on me too obey Thy command, I should have considered Thy transcendence too great for me to direct my invocation to Thee.
- My God, Thou hast created me, a body, and with it hast given to me instruments of obedience or disobedience, and hast appointed for me in my own nature a soul clamant for selfish ends, and after this Thou hast said to me, "Abstain, my servant!" Through Thee (only) can I guard my innocence. Keep me then from evil. Through Thee (only) can I be shielded from sin. Then do Thou keep me.
- Our God and Lord and Master, if we weep until our eyelashes fall out, and wail till our voices fail us, and stand till our feet shrivel, and bow till our joints are dislocated, and prostrate ourselves till our eyeballs burst, and eat the dust of the earth all our lives long, and make mention of Thee till our tongues fail, we shall not thereby have earned the wiping out of one of our misdeeds.
- One of the generous acts of the noble is compassionate kindness to captives, and I am a captive through my crime, the captive of my criminality, bound by my own deeds.
- I ask Thee to have mercy on me, on my delicate skin, this slender frame which cannot endure the heat of Thy sun. How then will it endure the heat of Thy Fire? And when it cannot bear the voice of Thy thunder, how can it bear the voice of Thine anger?
- My God my sins do not harm Thee and Thy pardon does not impoverish Thee. Then forgive me what does not harm Thee and give me what Thou wilt not miss.
- [O God!] Act toward me with the forgiveness and mercy of which Thou art worthy! Act not toward me with the chastisement and vengeance of which I am worthy!
- [O God!] Have mercy on me, laid on my bed, when the hands of my loved ones turn me over. Have mercy on me, laid on the washing table, when compassionate neighbors wash my corpse. Have mercy on me, borne among, when my relatives hold the sides of my bier. Have mercy on me, in that dark house, on my homesickness, my strangeness, my solitude. For whom has the slave to show mercy to him save the Master?
- O Companion of every stranger, be the Companion of my strangeness in the grave. O second with every solitary one, have mercy on my solitude in the grave.

== See also ==
- Al-Risalah al-huquq (attributed to Ali al-Sajjad)
- List of Shia books

== Sources ==
- Baghestani, I.; Emadi Haeri, M. (2017). "سجاد, امام" [Sajjad, Imam]. Encyclopaedia of the World of Islam (in Persian). Vol. 23.
- Chittick, W.C. (1987). "Translator's Introduction". The Psalms of Islam (As-sahifa Al-kamilah Al-sajjadiyya). The Muhammadi Trust of Great Britain and Northern Ireland. ISBN 094607951X.
- Dhalla, M.G. (2012). Alone with the Beloved: The Words of 'Alī b. al-Ḥusayn in The Ṣaḥīfa Sajjādiyya (PDF) (Thesis). University of Birmingham.
- Ilhami Niya, A.A. (2006). "Invocation Strategy in al-Sahifa al-Sajjadiyya". Hosun (in Persian) (4): 98–114.
- Kohlberg, E. (2012). "Zayn al-'Ābidīn". In Bearman, P.; Bianquis, Th.; Bosworth, C. E.; van Donzel, E.; Heinrichs, W. P. (eds.). Encyclopaedia of Islam (Second ed.). ISBN 9789004161214.
- Madelung, W. (1985). "'Alī b. Ḥosayn b. 'Alī b. Abī Ṭāleb". Encyclopaedia Iranica. Vol. I/8. pp. 849–850. ISSN 2330-4804.
- Momen, M. (1985). An Introduction to Shi'i Islam. Yale University Press. ISBN 9780300035315.
- Padwick, C.E. (1997). Muslim Devotions: A Study of Prayer-Manuals in Common Use. Oneworld Oxford. ISBN 1851681159.
- Shahri, M.H. (2006). "Human and Social Dimensions of al-Sahifa al-Sajjadiyya". Safina (in Persian) (9): 155–157.
