= Man La Yahduruhu al-Faqih =

Hadith collection by Ibn Babawayh

- Cover of the book
- Author: Ibn Babawayh
- Language: Arabic
- Published: 10th century

Man Lā Yaḥḍuruhu al-Faqīh (Arabic: مَنْ لَا يَحْضُرُه ٱلْفَقِيه, lit. 'He Who Has No Jurisprudent') is a Hadith collection by the famous Shia Hadith scholar Ibn Babawayh, commonly known as Ibn Babawayh or Sheikh al-Saduq (lit. The Truthful Scholar). This work is included among The Four Books of Shia Islam.

== Name ==
The book has also been translated as "Every Man His Own Lawyer."

== Compilation ==
In his introduction to the book the author explains the circumstances of its composition and the reason for its title. When he was at Ilaq near Balkh, he met Sharif al-Din Abu 'Abd Allah known as Ni'mah. He brought a book compiled by Muhammad b. Zakharia al-Razi entitled Man La Yahduruhu al-Tabeeb (English: He who has no Doctor) to the attention of al-Shaykh al-Saduq. He, then, asked him to compile a book on Fiqh (Islamic Jurisprudence), the Halal and the Haram (the permitted and prohibited) and al-shara-i' wa-'l-ahkam (revealed law and ordinary laws) which would draw on all the works which the Shaikh earlier had composed on the subject. This book would be called Man La Yahduruh al-Faqih and would function as a work of reference.

In the preface, Saduq explains that the book was compiled from earlier famous books which earlier Shiites had relied upon:

And all that which is in it (i.e. my book al-Faqih) is taken from famous books, on which we (the whole Ta’ifa) rely and to which we refer such as the book of Hariz b. Abdallah al-Sijistani, the book of Ubaydallah b. Ali al-Halabi, the books of Ali b. Mahziyar al-Ahwazi [etc.] [...]

== Contents ==
Man La Yahduruhu al-Faqih is mainly concerned with Furu al-Din. The book is meant to be a reference book to help ordinary Shia Muslims in the practise of the legal requirements of Islam. Generally, the Isnad's (list of the narrators) is absent. Thus, the book is a summary of the study of legal traditions. Shaikh al-Saduq himself said about his work:

I compiled the book without Isnads so that the chains (of authority) should not be too many (-and make the book too long-) and so that the book's advantages might be abundant. I did not have the usual intention of compilers (of books of traditions) to put forward everything which they (could) narrate but my intention was to put forward those things by which I gave legal opinions and which I judged to be correct.

== View ==
Shia Muslims regards this book as among the most reliable Hadith collections. Thus, the book is included in The Four Books of the Shia, together with Al-Kafi, Al-Istibsar and Tahdhib al-Ahkam. As with all Hadith collections, however, there is no guarantee of the authenticity of each individual hadith and the reliability of each must be separately assessed.

== See also ==
- List of Shia books
- The Four Books
- Al-Istibsar
- Kitab al-Kafi
- Tahdhib al-Ahkam
