= Bihar al-Anwar =

Shia hadith collection by Muhammad Baqir Majlisi

Bihar al-Anwar بِحَار ٱلْأَنْوَار
- Author: Mohammad-Baqer Majlesi
- Language: Arabic

Bihar al-Anwar (Arabic: بِحَار ٱلْأَنْوَار, romanized: Biḥār al-Anwār, lit. 'Seas of Lights') is a comprehensive collection of hadith (pl. ahadith) compiled by Shia scholar Mohammad-Baqer Majlesi (d. 1699 A.D.). It is the secondary Shi'ite hadith verification source after the Four Books.

== Overview ==
Bihar al-Anwar is the most comprehensive hadith collections, documenting over 100,000 items of Twelver Shia hadith along with Majlisi's commentary on these narrations. He used about 400 sources written by such Sunni and Shia scholars as Shaykh al-Saduq, Shaykh Tusi, Al-Shaykh Al-Mufid, Sharif al-Murtaza, Muhammad Jamaluddin al-Makki al-Amili, Sayyed Ibn Tawus, Al-Hilli, Zayn al-Din al-Juba'i al'Amili.

The full title of the book is:

Biḥār al-ʾAnwār al-Jāmiʿah li-Durar ʾAkhbār al-ʾAʾimmah al-Aṭhār

(Arabic: بِحَار ٱلْأَنْوَار ٱلْجَامِعَة لِدُرَر أَخْبَار ٱلَأَئِمَّة ٱلْأَطْهَار)

(lit. Oceans of Lights: The Compendium for Pearls of Traditions of the Pure Imams)

This lengthy title indicates Majlisi collected anything he had access to in the book. His primary goal was to preserve the knowledge for future generations and prevent forgery. Majlisi has acknowledged the forgery issue in the preface of Bihar al-Anwar, emphasizing that the traditions collected were not included without extensive scrutiny, although a consequence of his approach was that he has gathered both "pearls" and "pebbles".

The compilation of Bihar al-Anwar took 36 years, during which Majlisi received aid from other scholars and his students.

== Author ==
Mohammad-Baqer Majlesi was born in 1617 in Isfahan, the capital city of the Persian Empire. A student of Mulla Sadra, he was described in the journal Orient as "an unprecedentedly influential author in the world of Imami Shi'ism". On 1687, he was appointed as Sheikh ul-Islam of Isfahan by the emperor Sultan Husayn. He developed the Twelver doctrine by investigating Shia and Sunni hadith. He wrote over 100 books in Arabic and Persian.

== Editions ==
- Majlisī, Muḥammad Bāqir al-, Biḥār al-nwār al-Jāmiʿahli-Durar Akhbār al-Aʾimmat al-Aṭhār [The Oceans of Lights: A Compendium of the Pearls of the Narrations of the Pure Imāms], 110 vols (Beirut: Muʾassasat al-Wafāʾ, 1983).

== Commentaries ==
- Mashraʿa Biḥār al-Anwār – by Muḥammad Asif Mohseni
- Durrar al-Biḥār – by al-Mawlā Nūr al-Dīn Muḥammad ibn Murtaḍā
- Commentary on Biḥār al-Anwār – by ʿAbd al-Aʿlā al-Mūsawī al-Sabzawārī
- Gharīb al-Ḥadīth fī Biḥār al-Anwār (“Strange Expressions in Biḥār al-Anwār”) – by Ḥusayn al-Ḥusaynī al-Bīrjandī
- Anwār al-Biḥār – by Muḥammad ibn Muḥammad Hādī al-Nāʾīnī
- Manāhil al-Abrār fī Talkhīṣ Biḥār al-Anwār – by Ḥusayn Dargāhī
- Talkhīṣ al-Biḥār – by al-Mīrzā Muḥammad Ṣādiq al-Shīrāzī
- Ḥadīqat al-Azhār fī Talkhīṣ al-Biḥār – by al-Mīrzā Muḥammad ibn ʿAbd al-Nabī al-Nīshābūrī
- Talkhīṣ al-Anwār – by al-Mawlā Muḥammad Taqī, known as Āqā Najafī Iṣfahānī
- Mashrūʿ Biḥār al-Anwār (“Biḥār al-Anwār Project”) – by Muḥammad Āṣif Muḥsinī
- Talkhīṣ al-Biḥār – by al-Mīrzā Ibrāhīm ibn Ḥusayn ibn Ghafār al-Dunbulī al-Khūʾī
- Durrar al-Biḥār – by al-Mawlā Muḥammad Taqī ibn Muḥammad al-Khūʾī
- Banādir al-Biḥār – by Fayḍ al-Islām
- Muntakhab Biḥār al-Anwār – by Muḥammad Hādī ibn Murtaḍā al-Kāshānī

== See also ==
- Al-Hurr al-Aamili
- Al-Sharif al-Radi
- Al-Shaykh Al-Mufid
- Amina Bint al-Majlisi
- Du'a al-Kumayl
- ibn Babawayh
- List of Shi'a books
- Muhammad ibn Ya'qub al-Kulayni
- Nahj al-Balagha
- Safavid conversion of Iran to Shia Islam
- Sharif al-Murtaza
- Shaykh Tusi
- Umdat al-Talib fi Ansabi Ale Abi Talib
