= Al-Amali (Ibn Babawayh) =

Book by al-Shaykh al-Saduq

Al-Amali (Arabic: الأمالي, romanized: al-Amālī) means "book of dictations". The Al-Amali of Shaykh Saduq is a hadith collection by al-Shaykh al-Saduq, the shia jurist and theologian. Amālī or Majāles (Beirut, 1400/1980), recorded his regular Tuesday and Friday sessions in Nīšāpūr in 367-68/978-79. These dictations consist of miscellaneous traditions, but mostly accounts of the virtues of the Imams. These include the virtues and moral character of the household of Muhammad and moral exhortations.

== Subjects ==
Amali is a word applied to books in which prominent Muslims expressed their insights and thoughts, which they believed were bestowed upon them by Allah, a process which is viewed as a tradition among Muslim scholars.

== Features ==
This book is also known as Majlis, because it was collected as a result of meetings among Sheykh Al Sadouq and others. The book includes 97 Majlis. The first meeting took place in 18th of Rajab month 367 lunar Hijrah. The last summit occurred in Shaban month in Mashhad city near the shrine of imam Ali al-Ridha.

== Translation ==
Muhammad Baqir Kamarei translated the book into Persian. Ali Ibn Muhammad Ibn Asdollah Hoseini Arizi Sepahani Isfahani produced a translation into 11th century lunar Hijrah. Recently this book was translated to Persian by Hosein Abedi. It was translated in Urdu by moulana sundralvi of khushab Pakistan, which was later improved upon by Zishan Haider Zaidi of Lahore Pakistan.

Al-Amali was translated into English in 2022 by Bilal Muhammad.

The English translation of Al-Amaali (Shaykh Saduq) was done by Sayed Athar Rizvi and M/s Lantern Publications, Australia has released a bilingual version in Arabic and English, which can be sourced via Shiabooks Australia.
