= Kitab al-Kafi =

Book hadiths collected by Muḥammad ibn Yaʿqūb al-Kulaynī

Kitāb al-Kāfī
- Arabic: ٱلْكَافِي
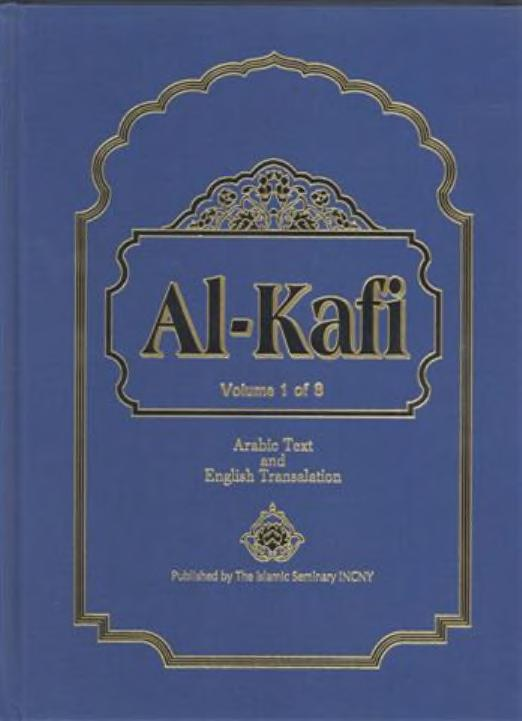
- Cover of the first volume of a modern edition of Al-Kafi

Information
- Religion: Islam (Twelver Shi'ism)
- Author: Muḥammad ibn Yaʿqūb al-Kulaynī
- Language: Arabic
- Chapters: 35 (in 3 sections)

Al-Kafi (Arabic: ٱلْكَافِي, al-Kāfī, 'The Sufficient') is the most important and authoritative hadith collection in Shia Islam, compiled in the first half of the 10th century CE (early 4th century AH) by Muḥammad ibn Yaʿqūb al-Kulaynī (c. 868–941). It is one of the Four Books (Kutub al Arba'a) of Shia Islam.

It is divided into three sections: Uṣūl al-Kāfī, dealing with epistemology, theology, history, ethics, supplication, and the Qurʾān; Furūʿ al-Kāfī, which is concerned with practical and legal issues; and Rawdat (or Rawḍat al-Kāfī), which includes miscellaneous traditions, many of which are lengthy letters and speeches transmitted from the Twelve Imams. In total, al-Kāfī comprises 16,199 narrations. It reportedly took him twenty years to finish the book.

== Contents ==
=== Usul al-Kafi ===
The first eight books of al-Kāfī are commonly referred to as Uṣūl al-Kāfī, Uṣūl meaning 'Fundamental'. The first typeset edition of the al-Kāfī, which was published in eight volumes, placed Uṣūl al-kāfī in the first two volumes. Generally speaking, Uṣūl al-kāfī contains traditions that deal with epistemology, theology, history, ethics, supplication, and the Qurʾān.

Uṣūl al-Kāfī:
Chapters	Traditions	Descriptions
Kitāb al-ʿaql wal jahl	The Book of Intellect and Ignorance	36 traditions
Kitāb faḍl al-ʿilm	The Book of Knowledge and its Merits	176 traditions
Kitāb at-tawḥīd	The Book of God and his Oneness	212 traditions
Kitāb al-ḥujjah	The Book of Divine Guidance	1015 traditions
Kitāb al-īmān wal kufr	The Book of Belief and Unbelief	1609 traditions
Kitāb ad-duʿāʾ	The Book of Supplication	409 traditions
Kitāb ʿadhamat al-Qurʾān	The Book of the Qurʾān and its Merits	124 Traditions
Kitāb al-muʿāsharah	The Book of Social Intercourse	464 traditions

=== Furūʿ al-Kāfī ===
Books 9 through 34 are referred to as Furūʿ al-Kāfī and are found in volumes three through seven of the first typeset edition. Furūʿ al-Kāfī contains traditions that deal predominantly with practical and legal issues.

Furū al-Kāfī
Chapters
The Book of Purity
The Book of Menstruation
The Book of Funeral Rites
The Book of Prayer
The Book of Charity
The Book of Fasting
The Book of Ḥajj
The Book of Jihād
The Book of Commerce
The Book of Marriage
The Book of Animal Sacrifice upon the Birth of a Child
The Book of Divorce
The Book of Emancipation
The Book of Hunting
The Book of Slaughtering
The Book of Food
The Book of Drink
The Book of Clothing, Beautification, and Honor
The Book of Domesticated Animals
The Book of Testaments
The Book of Inheritance
The Book of Capital and Corporal Punishments
The Book of Restitution and Blood Money
The Book of Testimonies and Depositions
The Book of Adjudication and Legal Precedents
The Book of Oaths, Vows, and Penances

=== Rawdat al-Kāfī ===
The final book stands alone as Rawdat or Rawḍah al-Kāfī, which is found in volume eight of the first typeset edition. Rawḍah al-Kāfī contains nearly 600 miscellaneous traditions, many of which are lengthy letters and speeches, not arranged in any particular order.

Rawdat al-Kāfī
Title
The Book of Miscellanea – literally a garden from which one can pick many kinds of flowers

== Authenticity ==
Most Shī‘ah scholars do not make any assumptions about the authenticity of a hadith book. Most believe that there are no ṣaḥīḥ ('sound', 'truthful') hadith books that are completely reliable. Hadith books are compiled by fallible people, and thus realistically, they inevitably have a mixture of strong and weak hadiths. Kulaynī himself stated in his preface that he only collected hadiths he thought were important and sufficient for Muslims to know, and he left the verification of these hadiths up to later scholars.

According to the Imami scholar Zayn al-Dīn al-ʿĀmili, known as ash-Shahīd ath-Thāni (1505–1559 CE, 911–966 AH), who examined the asanād or the chains of transmission of al-Kāfi traditions, 5,072 are considered ṣaḥīḥ; 144 are regarded as ḥasan ('good'), second category; 1,118 are held to be muwathaq ('trustworthy'), third category; 302 are adjudged to be qawi ('strong') and 9,485 traditions which are categorized as ḍaʿīf ('weak').

== Scholarly remarks ==
The author, Muḥammad ibn Yaʿqūb al-Kulaynī, stated in his preface to Al-Kafi:

You said that you would love to have a sufficient book [kitābun kāfin] containing enough of all the religious sciences to suffice the student; to serve as a reference for the disciple; from which those who seek knowledge of the religion and want to act on it can draw authentic traditions from the Truthful [imams] – may God's peace be upon them – and a living example upon which to act, by which our duty to God – almighty is he and sublime – and to the commands of his Prophet – may God's mercy be on him and his progeny – is fulfilled .... God – to whom belongs all praise – has facilitated the compilation of what you requested. I hope it is as you desired.

Imam Khomeini (a prominent 20th century Shī‘ah scholar and statesman) said:

Do you think it is enough [kafi] for our religious life to have its laws summed up in al-Kāfī and then placed upon a shelf?

The general idea behind this metaphor is that Khomeini objected to the laziness of many ignorant people who simply kept al-Kafi on their shelf, and ignored or violated it in their daily lives, assuming that they would somehow be saved from Hell just by possessing the book. Khomeini argued that Islamic law should be an integral part of everyday life for the believer, not just a stale manuscript to be placed on a shelf and forgotten. The irony of the allusion is telling; Khomeini implicitly says that al-Kāfī (literally 'the Sufficient') is not kafi ('enough') to make one a faithful Muslim or be counted among the righteous, unless one uses the wisdom contained within it and acts on it.

Shī‘ah scholar Shaykh Sadūq did not believe in the complete authenticity of al-Kāfī. Khoei points this out in his Mu‘jam Rijāl al-Hadīth, or Collection of Men of Narrations, in which he states:

Shaykh as-Sadūq did not regard all of the traditions in al-Kāfī to be Șaḥīḥ ['truthful']

Scholars have made such remarks to remind the people that one cannot simply pick the book up, and take whatever they like from it as truthful. Rather, an exhaustive process of authentication must be applied, which leaves the understanding of the book in the hands of the learned. From the Shī‘ah point of view, any book other than the Qurʾān, as well as individual hadiths or hadith narrators can be objectively questioned and scrutinized as to their reliability.

== Shia view of al-Kafi relative to other hadith books ==
Kulaynī stated in his preface that he only collected hadiths he thought were important and sufficient for Muslims to know, and he left the verification of these hadiths up to later scholars. Kulaynī also states, in reference to hadiths generally:

whatever [hadith] agrees with the Book of God [the Qurʾān], accept it. And whatever contradicts it, reject it

The author of al-Kāfi never intended for it to be politicized as "infallible", but compiled it to give sincere advice based on Islamic law (regardless of the soundess of any one particular hadith), and to preserve rare hadiths and religious knowledge in an easily accessible collection for future generations to study.

Al-Kāfi is the most comprehensive collection of traditions from the formative period of Islamic scholarship. It has been held in the highest esteem by generation after generation of Muslim scholars. Shaykh al-Mufīd (d. 1022 CE) extolled it as "one of the greatest and most beneficial of Shia books". Al-Shahīd al-ʾAwwāl (d. 1385 CE) and al-Muḥaqqiq al-Karāki (d. 1533 CE) have said, "No book has served the Shia as it has." The father of ʿAllāmah al Majlisī said, "Nothing [else] like it has been written for Islam."

== Commentaries ==
- Sharh Uṣul al-Kāfi, a commentary on Uṣul al-Kāfi by Mohammad Salih al-Mazandarani (17th century CE)
- Mir'at al-Uqul ('Mirror of the Mind'), a commentary on al-Kāfi by Mohammad-Baqer Majlesi (17th century CE)
- Sharh Uṣul al-Kāfi by Mulla Sadra (17th century CE)
- Șaḥīḥ al-Kāfi by Muhammad Baqir al-Behbudi (20th century CE)

== See also ==
- List of Shi'a books
