= Muhammad ibn Ya'qub al-Kulayni =

Persian Shia hadith collector (864–941 CE)

Muḥammad ibn Yaʿqūb al-Kulaynī مُحَمَّدُ بْنُ يَعْقُوبَ ٱلْكُلَيْنِيُّ
- Title: Thiqatul Islam ("The Trustworthy of Islam")

Personal life
- Born: 255 AH /868 CE
- Died: 329 AH /941 CE
- Era: Islamic Golden Age
- Region: Iran and Iraq
- Main interest: Ḥadīth
- Notable work: Kitāb al-Kāfī

Religious life
- Religion: Islam
- Denomination: Shia
- Sect: Twelver
- Jurisprudence: Akhbari

Muslim leader
- Teacher: Ali ibn Babawayh Qummi, Yaʿqūb al-Kulayni, Ali ibn Ibrahim al-Qummi
- Influenced by: Imam al-Mahdi
- Influenced: Shaykh al-Saduq, Ibn Qulawayh

Abū Jaʿfar Muḥammad ibn Yaʿqūb ibn Isḥāq al-Kulaynī ar-Rāzī (محمد بن یعقوب بن اسحاق کلینی رازی; أَبُو جَعْفَرٍ مُحَمَّدُ بْنُ يَعْقُوبَ بْنِ إِسْحَاقَ ٱلْكُلَيْنِيُّ ٱلرَّازِيُّ; c. 255 AH / 868 CE – 329 AH / 941 CE) was a Persian Shia Muslim scholar, hadith compiler, and the author of Kitāb al-Kāfī.

He was known for his extensive travels in search of hadith, particularly in Qom and Baghdad, and received his education under numerous teachers, many of whom were contemporaries of the tenth and eleventh Shia Imams, Ali al-Hadi (835–868) and Hasan al-Askari (868–874). He was also a teacher of several prominent scholars, including Shaykh al-Saduq and Ibn Qulawayh.

== Life ==
=== Birth ===
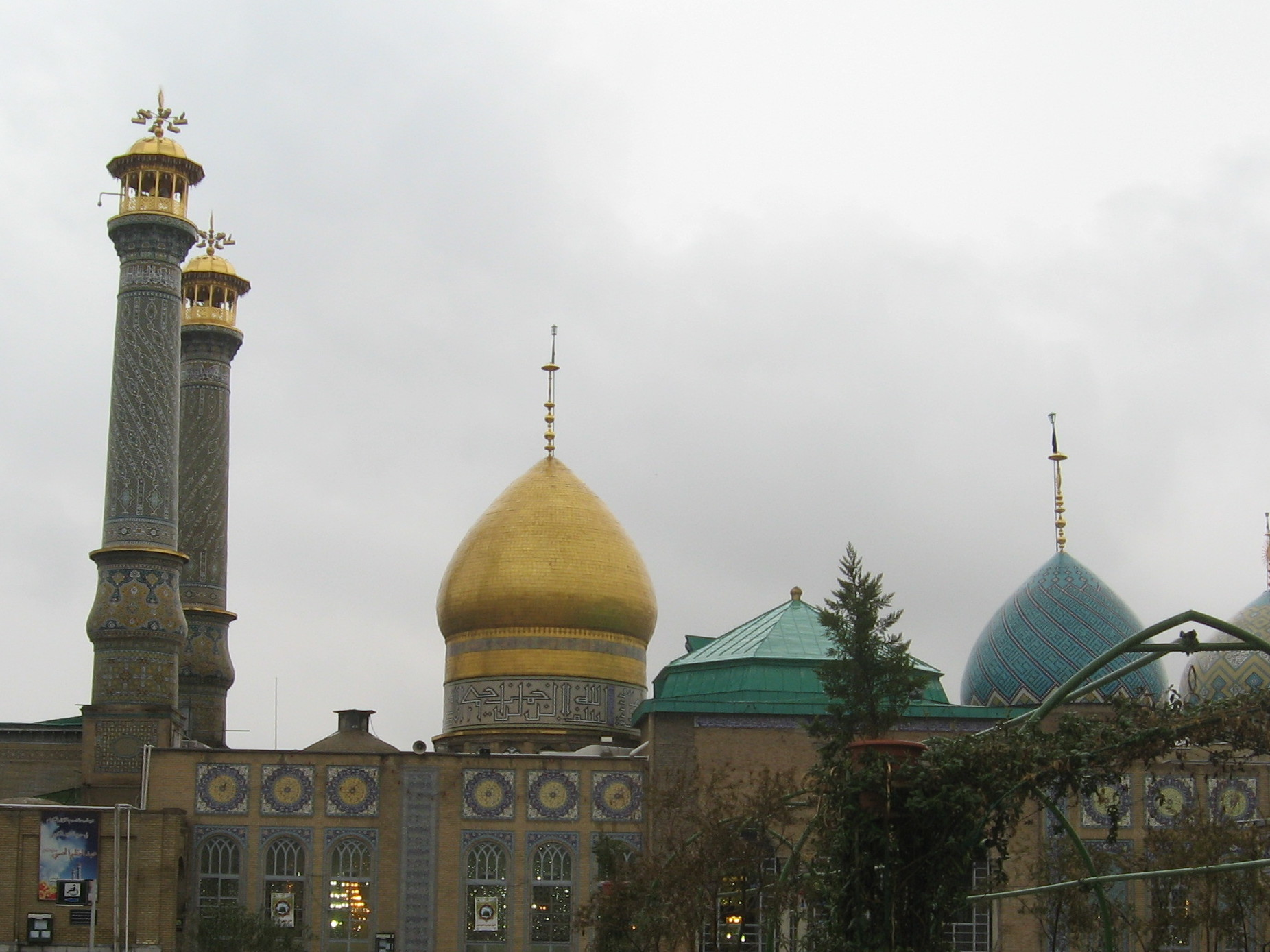
Shah Abdol-Azim Shrine in Ray, where Kulayni was born

Al-Kulayni was born in Kulayn, a village or small town situated near Rey, Iran, though sources do not specify the date of his birth. It's mentioned that his birth was around 255 AH (868), in the same time as that of Hujjat-Allah al-Mahdi, the last of the Twelve Imams who, according to Shia belief, is currently in major occultation (al-ghayba al-kubra) ever since 941, and will re-appear in the future. Others, like Abu al-Qasim al-Khoei, believe he(al-Kulaynī) was born after the passing of Hasan al-Askari (c. 874 CE). His father was Ya'qub al-Kulayni, who lived during the era of the Minor Occultation (874–941). He is claimed to have greatly benefited from al-Mahdi's divine knowledge by interacting with him through the Imam's Four Deputies.

=== Education ===
Kulayni received his early religious education in his native town and went to Rey for further education. According to Shia view he is among a special class of muhaddithin known as Rihalah-ye hadith (which means those who travelled in order to collect a hadith and met the persons considered to be the authority on hadith). He travelled to Baghdad, the capital of the Abbasid Caliphate, for this particular reason and lived there for twenty years, engaging in teaching and pursuing academic work, until he died in 329 AH/941 CE. He is known to have studied under more than fifty teachers, among them Ali ibn Ibrahim al-Qummi, who is the source of many narrations in his book. He is considered the foremost Shia compiler of hadith and was the author of Kitab al-Kafi.

== Work and contribution ==
Although Shaykh al-Kulaynī is most famous for al-Kāfī, this opus was not his only accomplishment. The following is a list of his known works:

- Kitāb al Kāfī
- Rasāʾil al ʾaʾimmah
- Kitāb ar-rijāl
- Kitāb ar radd ʿalā al qarāmitah
- Kitāb mā qīla fī al ʾaʾimmah min ash-shiʿr
- Kitāb taʿbīr al-ruʾyā

Of these only al-Kāfī has survived in its entirety.

Early Islamic scholars

Muhammad, The final Messenger of God (570–632) the Constitution of Medina, taught the Quran, and advised his companions
Abdullah ibn Masud (died 653) taught	Ali (607–661) fourth caliph taught	Aisha, Muhammad's wife and Abu Bakr's daughter taught	Abd Allah ibn Abbas (618–687) taught	Zayd ibn Thabit (610–660) taught	Umar (579–644) second caliph taught	Abu Hurairah (603–681) taught
Alqama ibn Qays (died 681) taught	Husayn ibn Ali (626–680) taught	Qasim ibn Muhammad ibn Abi Bakr (657–725) taught and raised by Aisha	Urwah ibn Zubayr (died 713) taught by Aisha, he then taught	Said ibn al-Musayyib (637–715) taught	Abdullah ibn Umar (614–693) taught	Abd Allah ibn al-Zubayr (624–692) taught by Aisha, he then taught
Ibrahim al-Nakha’i taught	Ali ibn Husayn Zayn al-Abidin (659–712) taught	Hisham ibn Urwah (667–772) taught	Ibn Shihab al-Zuhri (died 741) taught	Salim ibn Abd-Allah ibn Umar taught	Umar ibn Abdul Aziz (682–720) raised and taught by Abdullah ibn Umar
Hammad ibn Abi Sulayman taught	Muhammad al-Baqir (676–733) taught	Farwah bint al-Qasim Jafar's mother
Abu Hanifa (699–767) wrote Al Fiqh Al Akbar and Kitab Al-Athar, jurisprudence followed by Sunni, Sunni Sufi, Barelvi, Deobandi, Zaidiyyah and originally by the Fatimid and taught	Zayd ibn Ali (695–740)	Ja'far bin Muhammad Al-Baqir (702–765) Muhammad and Ali's great great grand son, jurisprudence followed by Shia, he taught	Malik ibn Anas (711–795) wrote Muwatta, jurisprudence from early Medina period now mostly followed by Maliki Sunnis in North Africa, and taught	Al-Waqidi (748–822) wrote history books like Kitab al-Tarikh wa al-Maghazi, student of Malik ibn Anas	Abu Muhammad Abdullah ibn Abdul Hakam (died 829) wrote biographies and history books, student of Malik ibn Anas
Abu Yusuf (729–798) wrote Usul al-fiqh	Muhammad al-Shaybani (749–805)	al-Shafi‘i (767–820) wrote Al-Risala, jurisprudence followed by Shafi'i Sunnis and Sufis, and taught	Ismail ibn Ibrahim	Ali ibn al-Madini (778–849) wrote The Book of Knowledge of the Companions	Ibn Hisham (died 833) wrote early history and As-Sirah an-Nabawiyyah, Muhammad's biography
Isma'il ibn Ja'far (719–775)	Musa al-Kadhim (745–799)	Ahmad ibn Hanbal (780–855) wrote Musnad Ahmad ibn Hanbal jurisprudence followed by Hanbali Sunnis and Sufis	Muhammad al-Bukhari (810–870) wrote Sahih al-Bukhari hadith books	Muslim ibn al-Hajjaj (815–875) wrote Sahih Muslim hadith books	Dawud al-Zahiri (815–883/4) founded the Zahiri school	Muhammad ibn Isa at-Tirmidhi (824–892) wrote Jami` at-Tirmidhi hadith books	Al-Baladhuri (died 892) wrote early history Futuh al-Buldan, Genealogies of the Nobles
Ibn Majah (824–887) wrote Sunan ibn Majah hadith book	Abu Dawood (817–889) wrote Sunan Abu Dawood Hadith Book
Muhammad ibn Ya'qub al-Kulayni (864- 941) wrote Kitab al-Kafi hadith book followed by Twelver Shia	Muhammad ibn Jarir al-Tabari (838–923) wrote History of the Prophets and Kings, Tafsir al-Tabari	Abu al-Hasan al-Ash'ari (874–936) wrote Maqālāt al-islāmīyīn, Kitāb al-luma, Kitāb al-ibāna 'an usūl al-diyāna
Ibn Babawayh (923–991) wrote Man La Yahduruhu al-Faqih jurisprudence followed by Twelver Shia	Sharif Razi (930–977) wrote Nahj al-Balagha followed by Twelver Shia	Nasir al-Din al-Tusi (1201–1274) wrote jurisprudence books followed by Ismaili and Twelver Shia	Al-Ghazali (1058–1111) wrote The Niche for Lights, The Incoherence of the Philosophers, The Alchemy of Happiness on Sufism	Rumi (1207–1273) wrote Masnavi, Diwan-e Shams-e Tabrizi on Sufism
Key: Some of Muhammad's Companions	Key: Taught in Medina	Key: Taught in Iraq	Key: Worked in Syria	Key: Travelled extensively collecting the sayings of Muhammad and compiled books of hadith	Key: Worked in Persia

== See also ==
- Tafsir Numani
- Tafsir Qomi
- Sharif al-Murtaza
- Al-Sharif al-Radi
- Al-Shaykh Al-Mufid
- Al-Hurr al-Aamili
