= The Four Books =

Four canonical hadith collections of Shia Islam

The Four Books (Arabic: ٱلْكُتُب ٱلْأَرْبَعَة, romanized: al-Kutub al-ʾArbaʿa) are the four canonical hadith collections of Twelver Shi‘a Islam.

Name	Collector	No. of hadith
Kitab al-Kafi (Note: Divided into Usul al-Kafi, Furu al-Kafi and Rawdat al-Kafi.)	Muhammad ibn Ya'qub al-Kulayni al-Razi (329 AH)	16,199
Man La Yahduruhu al-Faqih	Muhammad ibn Babawayh	9,044
Tahdhib al-Ahkam	Shaykh Muhammad Tusi	13,590
Al-Istibsar	Shaykh Muhammad Tusi	5,511
Total ahādith		44,344

Twelver Shi‘a Muslims use different hadith books than those used by Sunni Muslims, (Note: However, for example Zaydi Shi'a Muslims accept and hold Sunni Hadith collections in high esteem.) who prize the six major hadith collections. Unlike Sunnis, the Twelver Shi‘a uphold the Twelve Imams as their absolute authority of religion after the prophet Muhammad, and thus much of their hadith is transmitted on the authority of the Imams. Shi‘is consider many hadith transmitters in Sunni tradition to be unreliable, particularly due to their indifferent or, at times, antagonistic stance towards Ahl al-Bayt (Arabic: أهل البيت, lit. 'People of the Household [of Muhammad]').

== See also ==
- List of Shi'a books
- Kutub al-Sittah
