= Al-Mufaddal ibn Umar al-Ju'fi =

8th-century Shi'i ghulat leader

al-Mufaḍḍal ibn ʿUmar al-Juʿfī
- المفضل بن عمر الجعفي
- Born: before 748 (Note: Abu al-Khattab was repudiated by Ja'far al-Sadiq in c. 748 and died in 755–6 (Amir-Moezzi 2013). In this period al-Mufaddal was ordered by Ja'far al-Sadiq to bring Abu al-Khattab's followers back on the right path, and al-Mufaddal is said to have briefly become a follower of Abu al-Khattab himself. These events must have occurred in the middle period of al-Mufaddal's life (Turner 2006, p. 183).)
- Died: before 799
- Region: Kufa (Iraq)
- Affiliation: early Shi'ism / ghulāt

Mufaddal Tradition
- Ghulāt: Writings: Kitāb al-Haft wa-l-aẓilla; Kitāb al-Ṣirāṭ; al-Risāla al-Mufaḍḍaliyya; Mā yakūn ʿinda ẓuhūr al-Mahdī; Kitāb Mā iftaraḍa Allāh ʿalā al-jawāriḥ min al-īmān
- Ideas: pre-existent shadows; divinization of the Imam; tajallin; tanāsukh (metempsychosis); seven degrees of spiritual perfection; heavenly ascent; great chain of being; bāṭin (occult) knowledge; adwār (world cycles).; rajʿa (return of the Imam)
- Influenced: Alawism (Nusayrism); Isma'ilism
- Non-ghulāt: Writings: Tawḥīd al-Mufaḍḍal; Kitāb al-Ihlīlaja; Waṣiyyat al-Mufaḍḍal; Duʿāʾ samāt; Riwāyat al-ruzz wa-mā fīhi min al-faḍl; al-Ḥikam al-Jaʿfariyya
- Ideas: Teleological argument (argument from design)
- Influenced: Twelver Shi'ism

Abū ʿAbd Allāh al-Mufaḍḍal ibn ʿUmar al-Juʿfī (Arabic: أبو عبد ﷲ المفضل بن عمر الجعفي), died before 799, was an early Shi'i leader and the purported author of a number of religious and philosophical writings. A contemporary of the Imams Ja'far al-Sadiq (c. 700–765) and Musa al-Kazim (745–799), he belonged to those circles in Kufa whom later Twelver Shi'i authors would call ghulāt ('exaggerators') for their 'exaggerated' veneration of the Imams.

As a money-changer, al-Mufaddal wielded considerable financial and political power. He was likely also responsible for managing the financial affairs of the Imams in Medina. For a time he was a follower of the famous ghulāt leader Abu al-Khattab (died 755–6), who had claimed that the Imams were divine. Early Imami (Note: Although the term 'Imami' is synonymous with 'Twelver' when speaking about the period from c. 941 onward, it is also used by scholars to refer to that branch of early Shi'ism which would eventually develop into Twelver Shi'ism, before the number of Imams was fixed at twelve. The notion of twelve Imams is not yet found in the works of al-Barqi (died in 887 or 893), but a few hadiths mentioning that there would be twelve Imams were recorded by al-Saffar al-Qummi (died 903). The earliest text to unambiguously list the twelve Imams as we now know them is Ali ibn Ibrahim al-Qummi's (died 919) Tafsīr al-Qummī. Nevertheless, definitively fixing the number of Imams at twelve only became common from the time of al-Kulayni (died 941), and the doctrine that ultimately distinguished Twelver Shi'ism from earlier forms of Imami Shi'ism is the belief in the Major Occultation of the twelfth Imam Muhammad al-Mahdi, which occurred in 941 (the twelfth Imam was thought to have disappeared as a young boy in 874, initiating what is known as the Minor Occultation). See Amir-Moezzi 2007–2012; Kohlberg 1976, p. 521.) heresiographers and Nusayri sources regard al-Mufaddal as a staunch supporter of Abu al-Khattab's ideas who later spawned his own ghulāt movement (the Mufaḍḍaliyya). However, Twelver Shi'i sources instead report that after Ja'far al-Sadiq's repudiated Abu al-Khattab in 748, al-Mufaddal broke with Abu al-Khattab and became a trusted companion of Ja'far's son Musa al-Kazim.

A number of writings—collectively known as the Mufaddal Tradition—have been attributed to al-Mufaddal, most of which are still extant. They were likely falsely attributed to al-Mufaddal by later 9th–11th-century authors. As one of the closest confidants of Ja'far al-Sadiq, al-Mufaddal was an attractive figure for authors of various Shi'i persuasions: by attributing their own ideas to him they could invest these ideas with the authority of the Imam. The writings attributed to al-Mufaddal are very different in nature and scope, but Ja'far al-Sadiq is the main speaker in most of them.

A major part of the extant writings attributed to al-Mufaddal originated among the ghulāt, an early branch of Shi'i Islam. (Note: The ghulāt were widespread in the 8th/9th century, but are now nearly extinct. The Nusayris or Alawites are the only ghulāt sect still in existence today (see Halm 2001–2012).) A recurring theme in these texts is the myth of the world's creation through the fall from grace of pre-existent "shadows" or human souls, whom God punished for their disobedience by concealing himself from them and by casting them down into the seven heavens. The Kitāb al-Haft wa-l-aẓilla (Book of the Seven and the Shadows, 8th to 11th centuries) develops the theme of seven primordial Adams who rule over the seven heavens and initiate the seven historical world cycles. The Kitāb al-Ṣirāṭ (Book of the Path, written c. 874–941) describes an initiatory "path" leading believers back through the seven heavens towards God. Those who grow in religious devotion and knowledge climb upwards on the chain of being, but others are reborn into human bodies, while unbelievers travel downwards and reincarnate into animal, vegetable, or mineral bodies. (Note: The concept of reincarnation into human (naskh), animal (maskh), or plant and mineral (raskh) bodies is also a common theme in other ghulāt texts. The Kitāb al-Haft wa-l-aẓilla goes a little bit further than the Kitāb al-Ṣirāṭ, also describing other forms of hierarchy within one class: among humans, female bodies rank below male ones, and among animals inedible species rank below edible ones; see Asatryan 2017, pp. 152–153. Some other forms, like waskh and faskh, are described in the context of Nusayri works by Friedman 2010, p. 106.) Those who reach the seventh heaven and attain the rank of Bāb ("Gate") (Note: On the concept of Bāb in Shi'ism, see MacEoin 1988–2011.) enjoy a beatific vision of God and share the divine power to manifest themselves in the world of matter.

Among the extant non-ghulāt texts attributed to al-Mufaddal, most of which were preserved in the Twelver Shi'i tradition, two treatises stand out for their philosophical content. These are the Tawḥīd al-Mufaḍḍal (al-Mufaddal's Tawhid) and the Kitāb al-Ihlīlaja (Book of the Myrobalan Fruit), both of which feature Ja'far al-Sadiq presenting al-Mufaddal with a proof for the existence of God. The teleological argument used in the Tawḥīd al-Mufaḍḍal is inspired by Syriac Christian literature (especially commentaries on the Hexameron), and ultimately goes back to Hellenistic models such as pseudo-Aristotle's De mundo (3rd/2nd century BCE) and Stoic theology as recorded in Cicero's (106–43 BCE) De natura deorum. The dialectical style of the Kitāb al-Ihlīlaja is more typical of early Muslim speculative theology (kalām), and the work may originally have been authored by the 8th-century scribe Muhammad ibn Layth. Both works may be regarded as part of an attempt to rehabilitate al-Mufaddal as a reliable transmitter of hadiths in the Twelver Shi'i tradition.

== Life ==
Al-Mufaddal was a non-Arab mawlā ("client") of the Ju'fa, a tribe belonging to the South-Arabian Madhhij confederation. Apart from the fact that he was a money-changer based in Kufa (Iraq), very little is known about his life. He probably managed the financial affairs of the Shi'ite Imams Ja'far al-Sadiq (c. 700–765) and Musa al-Kazim (745–799), who resided in Medina (Arabia). Using his professional network, he actively raised funds for the Imams in Medina, thus also playing an important role as an intermediary between the Imams and the Shi'ite community. His date of death is unknown, but he died before Musa al-Kazim, who died in 799. (Note: A detailed review of the biographical information on al-Mufaddal may be found in Asatryan 2017, pp. 46–61.)

At some point during his life, al-Mufaddal's relations with Ja'far al-Sadiq soured because of his adherence to the teachings of the Kufan ghulāt leader Abu al-Khattab (died 755–6). Abu al-Khattab had been a designated spokesman of Ja'far, but in c. 748 he was excommunicated by the Imam for his 'extremist' or 'exaggerated' (ghulāt) ideas, particularly for having declared Ja'far to be divine. However, al-Mufaddal later recanted and cut of all contact with the Khaṭṭabiyya (the followers of Abu al-Khattab), leading to a reconciliation with Ja'far.

This episode was understood in widely different ways by later Shi'i authors. On the one hand, early Imami (i.e., proto-Twelver Shi'i) heresiographers report the existence of a ghulāt sect named after him, the Mufaḍḍaliyya, who would have declared Ja'far to be God and al-Mufaddal his prophet or Imam. It is not certain whether the Mufaḍḍaliyya really ever existed, and if they did, whether they really held the doctrines attributed to them by the heresiographers. Nevertheless, al-Mufaddal was also highly regarded by the members of other ghulāt sects such as the Mukhammisa, (Note: On the Mukhammisa, see Asatryan 2000–2013.) and several of the writings attributed to him contain ghulāt ideas. He was even accused in some hadith reports of having tried to contaminate Ja'far's eldest son Isma'il with the ideas of Abu al-Khattab. In addition, most works attributed to al-Mufaddal were preserved by the Nusayris, a ghulāt sect that survives to this day and that sometimes regarded al-Mufaddal as a Bāb (an official deputy of the Imam and a "gateway" to his secret knowledge). (Note: Modaressi 2003, p. 333 also describes al-Mufaddal as a "leader of the Mufawwiḍa school of Shı̄‘ite Extremism". The heresiographers described the Mufawwiḍa as a ghulāt sect who believed that the Imams were delegated (Arabic: tafwīḍ) by God to perform divine tasks such as creating and sustaining the universe. However, Asatryan 2000–2012b notes that the hadith reports in which al-Mufaddal is credited with Mufawwiḍa views always end with a refutation of those views by the Imam. According to Asatryan 2017, pp. 98–111, tafwīḍ-like ideas often go hand in hand with the divinization of prophets and Imams as practiced by the ghulāt, and the concept of a separate group called the Mufawwiḍa is likely a mere construct of the heresiographers.)

On the other hand, later Twelver Shi'i sources often insist that al-Mufaddal never gave in to heresy, and they often emphasize that it was al-Mufaddal who was appointed by Ja'far to lead the Khaṭṭabiyya back to the right path. Some of the works attributed to al-Mufaddal, like the Kitab al-Ihlīlaja and the Tawḥīd al-Mufaḍḍal, explicitly refute those who would deny the exclusive oneness (tawḥīd) of God. These works may have been written in order to rehabilitate al-Mufaddal within the Twelver tradition and to prove his reliability as a hadith transmitter. But even among Twelver scholars there was dissension. For example, while al-Shaykh al-Mufid (c. 948–1022) praised al-Mufaddal as a learned person and a trustworthy companion of the Imams, al-Najashi (c. 982–1058) and Ibn al-Ghada'iri (fl. first half of the 11th century) denounced him as an unbelieving heretic.

== Ghulāt works ==
=== Kitāb al-Haft wa-l-aẓilla (Book of the Seven and the Shadows) ===
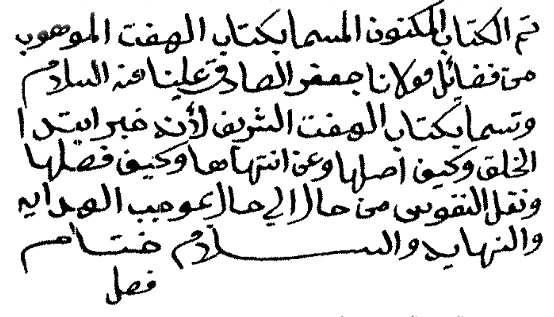
The last paragraph of the Kitāb al-Haft wa-l-aẓilla, from a manuscript of unknown provenance: "Thus is finished the concealed book called the Book of the Seven, which was a gift of grace from our lord Ja'far al-Sadiq, peace be upon us from him. It is called the Noble Book of the Seven because it reports about the beginning of creation and its origin, about its ending and conclusion, and about the translocation of souls from state to state in accordance with divine guidance and limitation. Peace, the end."

==== Content ====
The Kitāb al-Haft wa-l-aẓilla (Book of the Seven and the Shadows), also known as Kitāb al-Haft al-sharīf (Noble Book of the Seven) or simply as Kitāb al-Haft (Book of the Seven), (Note: Edition of the Arabic text in Tāmir & Khalifé 1960, Ghālib 1964, and Tāmir 2007; critical edition of chapter 59 in Asatryan 2020, pp. 296–298; discussion of the various editions in Asatryan 2017, pp. 18–19. On this text, see also Halm 1978; Halm 1981 (continuation of Halm 1978); Capezzone 1999; Asatryan 2017, 13–42 et passim. According to Madelung 1963, p. 181, followed by Halm 1978, p. 220 and Asatryan 2012, p. 145, the word haft is a Persian loanword meaning 'seven' (Madelung refers to the use of al-haft and al-haftiyya to designate sevenfold things like the seven Adams or the seven heavens, in Tāmir & Khalifé 1960, pp. 125, 128, 130; cf. Ghālib 1964, pp. 163, 167, 171; Tāmir 2007, pp. 173, 176, 179).) 8th–11th centuries, is perhaps the most important work attributed to al-Mufaddal. It sets out in great detail the ghulāt myth of the pre-existent "shadows" (Arabic: aẓilla) whose fall from grace led to the creation of the material world. This theme of pre-existent shadows seems to have been typical of the 8th-century Kufan ghulāt: also appearing in other early ghulāt works such as the Umm al-kitāb, it may ultimately go back to Abd Allah ibn Harb (d. after 748).

Great emphasis is placed throughout the work on the need to keep the knowledge received from Ja'far al-Sadiq, who is referred to as mawlānā ("our lord"), from falling into the wrong hands. This secret knowledge is entrusted by Ja'far to al-Mufaddal, but is reserved only for true believers (muʾminūn). It involves notions such as the transmigration of souls (tanāsukh or metempsychosis) and the idea that seven Adams exist in the seven heavens, each one of them presiding over one of the seven historical world cycles. This latter idea may reflect an influence from Isma'ilism, where the appearance of each new prophet (Adam, Noah, Abraham, Moses, Jesus, Muhammad, Muhammad ibn Isma'il) is likewise thought to initiate a new world cycle.

A central element of the Kitāb al-Haft wa-l-aẓilla is the creation myth involving pre-existent "shadows", which also occurs in many other ghulāt works with slightly different details. According to this myth, the first created beings were human souls who initially dwelt in the presence of God in the form of shadows. When the shadows disobeyed God, he created a veil (ḥijāb) in which he concealed himself as a punishment. (Note: In the Kitāb al-Ṣirāṭ's (see below) version of the myth, after God concealed himself, some of the pre-existent beings (who in this work are not called shadows) denied that the figure in which God appeared to them was really divine, insisting that he was merely human (see Asatryan 2017, p. 139).) Then God created the seven heavens as a dwelling place for the disobedient souls, according to their sin. In each of the heavens God also created bodies from his own light for the souls who arrived there, and from the souls' disobedience he created the Devil. Finally, from the offspring of the Devil God created the bodies of animals and various other sublunary entities (masūkhiyya).

==== Composition and legacy ====
The Kitāb al-Haft wa-l-aẓilla consists of at least eleven different textual layers which were added over time, each of them containing slightly different versions of ghulāt concepts and ideas. The earliest layers were written in 8th/9th-century Kufa, perhaps partly by al-Mufaddal himself, or by his close associates Yunus ibn Zabyan and Muhammad ibn Sinan (died 835). A possible indication for this is the fact that Muhammad ibn Sinan also wrote two works dealing with the theme of pre-existent shadows: the Kitāb al-Aẓilla (Book of the Shadows) and the Kitāb al-Anwār wa-ḥujub (Book of the Lights and the Veils). Shi'i bibliographical sources also list several other 8th/9th-century Kufan authors who wrote a Kitāb al-Aẓilla or Book of the Shadows. In total, at least three works closely related to al-Mufaddal's Kitāb al-Haft wa-l-aẓilla are extant, all likely dating to the 8th or 9th century:

1. Muhammad ibn Sinan's Kitāb al-Anwār wa-ḥujub (Book of the Lights and the Veils)
2. an anonymous work called the Kitāb al-Ashbāh wa-l-aẓilla (Book of the Apparitions and the Shadows) (Note: On the anonymous Kitāb al-Ashbāh wa-l-aẓilla, see Asatryan 2015.)
3. another anonymous work also called the Kitāb al-Aẓilla (Book of the Shadows). (Note: On the anonymous Kitāb al-Aẓilla (found in another work called the Kitāb al-Kursī), see Asatryan 2016, pp. 131–135.)

Though originating in the milieus of the early Kufan ghulāt, the Kitāb al-Haft wa-l-aẓilla was considerably expanded by members of a later ghulāt sect called the Nusayris (now called the Alawites), who were active in 10th-century Syria. The Nusayris were probably also responsible for the work's final 11th-century form. However, the Kitāb al-Haft wa-l-aẓilla was not preserved by the Nusayris, but by the Syrian Nizari Isma'ilis. Like the Umm al-kitāb, another ghulāt work that was transmitted by the Nizari Isma'ilis of Central Asia, it contains ideas which –despite being largely unrelated to Isma'ili doctrine– influenced various later Isma'ili authors starting from the 10th century. (Note: Early Isma'ili authors who adapted ghulāt ideas include Ja'far ibn Mansur al-Yaman (died c. 957; see De Smet 2020, pp. 303, 308; the ghulāt influences on Ja'far ibn Mansur al-Yaman's Kitāb al-Kashf are discussed by Asatryan 2020) and Abu Ya'qub al-Sijistani (died after 971; see De Smet 2020, pp. 304, 307–308). The influence of these ideas was pervasive in Tayyibi Isma'ilism (see De Smet 2020, pp. 320–321 et passim).)

=== Kitāb al-Ṣirāṭ (Book of the Path) ===
The Kitāb al-Ṣirāṭ (Book of the Path) is another purported dialogue between al-Mufaddal and Ja'far al-Sadiq, likely composed in the period between the Minor and the Major Occultation (874–941). (Note: Edition of the Arabic text in Capezzone 1995 and Ibn ʿAbd al-Jalīl 2005. On this text, see also Capezzone 1993. It is not to be confused with the similarly named Kitāb al-Ṣirāṭ by the 9th-century ghulāt author Ishaq al-Ahmar al-Nakha'i (died 899, see Asatryan 2000–2012a; Asatryan 2017, p. 200 s.v. Isḥāq Aḥmar al-Nakhaʿī).) This work deals with the concept of an initiatory "path" (Arabic: ṣirāṭ) leading the adept on a heavenly ascent towards God, with each of the seven heavens corresponding to one of seven degrees of spiritual perfection. It also contains references to typical ghulāt ideas like tajallin (the manifestation of God in human form), tanāsukh (metempsychosis or transmigration of the soul), maskh/raskh (metamorphosis or reincarnation into non-human forms), and the concept of creation through the fall from grace of pre-existent beings (as in the Kitāb al-Haft wa-l-aẓilla, see above).

The philosophical background of the work is given by the late antique concept of a great chain of being linking all things together in one great cosmic hierarchy. This hierarchical system extends from the upper world of spirit and light (populated by angels and other pure souls) to the lower world of matter and darkness (populated by humans, and below them animals, plants and minerals). Humanity is perceived as taking a middle position in this hierarchy, being located at the top of the world of darkness and at the bottom of the world of light. Those human beings who lack the proper religious knowledge and belief are reborn into other human bodies, which are likened to 'shirts' (qumṣān, sing. qamīṣ) that a soul can put on and off again. This is called tanāsukh or naskh. But grave sinners are reborn instead into animal bodies (maskh), and the worst offenders are reborn into the bodies of plants or minerals (raskh). On the other hand, those believers who perform good works and advance in knowledge also travel upwards on the ladder, putting on ever more pure and luminous 'shirts' or bodies, ultimately reaching the realm of the divine. This upwards path is represented as consisting of seven stages above that of humanity, each located in one of the seven heavens:

1. al-Mumtaḥā: the Tested, first heaven
2. al-Mukhliṣ: the Devout, second heaven
3. al-Mukhtaṣṣ: the Elect, third heaven
4. al-Najīb: the Noble, fourth heaven
5. al-Naqīb: the Chief, fifth heaven
6. al-Yatīm: the Unique, sixth heaven
7. al-Bāb: the Gate, seventh heaven

At every degree the initiate receives the chance to gain a new level of 'hidden' or 'occult' (bāṭin) knowledge. If the initiate succeeds at internalizing this knowledge, they may ascend to the next degree. If, however, they lose interest or start to doubt the knowledge already acquired, they may lose their pure and luminous "shirt", receiving instead a heavier and darker one, and descend down the scale of being again. Those who reach the seventh degree (that of Bāb or "Gate") are granted wondrous powers such as making themselves invisible, or seeing and hearing all things –including a beatific vision of God– without having to look or listen. Most notably, they are able to manifest themselves to ordinary beings in the world of matter (tajallin), by taking on the form of a human and appearing to anyone at will. This ability is shared between the "Gates" in the seventh heaven and God, who also manifests himself to the world by taking on a human form.

The theme of a heavenly ascent through seven degrees of spiritual perfection is also explored in other ghulāt works, including the anonymous Kitāb al-Marātib wa-l-daraj (Book of Degrees and Stages), as well as various works attributed to Muhammad ibn Sinan (died 835), Ibn Nusayr (died after 868), and others. In the 9th/10th-century works attributed to the Shi'i alchemist Jabir ibn Hayyan, the seven degrees corresponding to the seven heavens (themselves related to the seven planets) are replaced with fifty-five degrees carrying similar names (including al-Muʾmin al-Mumtaḥā, al-Najīb, al-Naqīb, al-Yatīm, al-Bāb). These fifty-five degrees correspond to the fifty-five celestial spheres alluded to by Plato in his Timaeus and mentioned by Aristotle in his Metaphysics.

=== Other ghulāt works ===
- al-Risāla al-Mufaḍḍaliyya (Mufaddali Epistle) (Note: Edition of the Arabic text in Abū Mūsā & al-Shaykh Mūsā 2006, pp. 9–18.) is a brief dialogue between al-Mufaddal and Ja'far al-Sadiq of unclear date and origin. It strongly resembles the Kitāb al-Haft wa-l-aẓilla and the Kitāb al-Ṣirāṭ in doctrine and terminology. Its main subject is the classical theological question of the relationship between the one transcendent God (al-maʿnā, lit. 'the meaning') on the one hand, and his many attributes (ṣiffāt) and names (asmāʾ) on the other.
- Mā yakūn ʿinda ẓuhūr al-Mahdī (What Will Happen at the Appearance of the Mahdi) (Note: Modaressi 2003, p. 335 notes that the full Arabic text was preserved by al-Khasibi (died 969) in his al-Hidāya al-kubrā (ed. Beirut 1986, pp. 392–437), with slightly different versions preserved by Hasan ibn Sulayman al-Hilli (fl. c. 1399) in his Mukhtaṣar Baṣāʾir al-darajāt (ed. Najaf 1950, pp. 178–192) and by Muhammad Baqir al-Majlisi (died 1699) in his Biḥār al-anwār (al-Majlisi 1983, vol. 53, pp. 1–35). Strongly abridged translation of al-Majlisi's version by Turner 2006, pp. 177–180. On this text, see also Anthony 2012b.) is a lengthy apocalyptic text about the state of the world during the end times, just before the return (rajʿa) of the Mahdi. (Note: On the concept of the Mahdi in Shi'i Islam, see Amir-Moezzi 2007–2012.) Its earliest known version is preserved in a work by the Nusayri author al-Khasibi (died 969), but the text likely goes back to the 9th century and perhaps even to al-Mufaddal himself. Though mainly dealing with the actions that the Mahdi will undertake to render justice to the oppressed, the work also contains references to mainstream Shi'i ideas such as temporary marriage contracts (mutʿa), as well as to the ghulāt idea of world cycles. It has been argued that the conceptualization of rajʿa in this and similar 8th/9th-century ghulāt texts has influenced the 10th-century development of the Twelver Shi'i doctrine on the return of the twelfth and 'hidden' Imam Muhammad al-Mahdi.
- Kitāb Mā iftaraḍa Allāh ʿalā al-jawāriḥ min al-īmān (Book on the Faith that God has Imposed on the Bodily Members), also known as the Kitāb al-Īmān wa-l-islām (Book of Faith and Submission) and perhaps identical to the Risālat al-Mayyāḥ (Epistle of the Swagger) mentioned by the Twelver Shi'i bibliographer al-Najashi (c. 982–1058), (Note: Modaressi 2003, pp. 335–336 notes that the text is quoted by al-Saffar al-Qummi (died 903) in his Baṣāʾir al-darajāt (ed. M. Kūchabāghı̄, Tabriz, pp. 526–536) and that a short fragment of it also occurs in Ibn Babawayh's (died 991) ʿIlal al-sharāʾiʿ (ed. F.T. al-Yazdı̄, Qum, vol. 1, pp. 238–239). Modaressi's identification of this work with the Risālat al-Mayyāḥ mentioned by al-Najashi is based on the identical chain of transmission.) presents itself as a long letter from Ja'far al-Sadiq to al-Mufaddal. It was preserved by the Imami (i.e., proto-Twelver) scholar al-Saffar al-Qummi (died 903). Likely written as a reaction to the negative portrayals of the ghulāt by Imami heresiographers, it refutes the typical accusation of the ghulāt's purported licentiousness and sexual promiscuity. It also contains a reference to the obscure idea, likewise found in the Kitāb al-Haft wa-l-aẓilla but attributed here to Abu al-Khattab (died 755–6), that religious commandments and restrictions are 'men' (rijāl), and that to know these 'men' is to know religion.

== Mu'tazili-influenced works ==
Two of the treatises attributed to al-Mufaddal, the Tawḥīd al-Mufaḍḍal and the Kitāb al-Ihlīlaja, differ from other treatises attributed to al-Mufaddal by the absence of any content that is specifically Shi'i in nature. Though both were preserved by the 17th-century Shi'i scholar Muhammad Baqir al-Majlisi (died 1699), the only element connecting them to Shi'ism is their ascription to Ja'far al-Sadiq and al-Mufaddal. Their content appears to be influenced by Mu'tazilism, a rationalistic school of Islamic speculative theology (kalām). Often transmitted together in the manuscript tradition, they may be regarded as part of an attempt to rehabilitate al-Mufaddal among Twelver Shi'is, to whom al-Mufaddal was important as a narrator of numerous hadiths from the Imams Ja'far al-Sadiq and his son Musa al-Kazim. Both works were also known to other Twelver scholars such as al-Najashi (c. 982–1058), Ibn Shahrashub (died 1192), and Ibn Tawus (1193–1266).

=== Tawḥīd al-Mufaḍḍal (al-Mufaddal's Tawhid) ===
The Tawḥīd al-Mufaḍḍal (lit. 'Declaration by al-Mufaddal of the Oneness of God') (Note: Arabic text in al-Majlisi 1983, vol. 3, pp. 57–151 (referred to by Modaressi 2003, p. 334; Asatryan 2000–2012b; Turner 2006, pp. 184, 194, note 42). The work is probably identical with the Kitāb fī badʾ al-khalq wa-l-ḥathth ʿalā al-iʿtibār (Book on the Beginning of Creation and the Incitement to Contemplation) mentioned by al-Najashi, who also referred to the work as the Kitāb Fakkir (lit. 'Book of Think'); see Chokr 1993, deuxième partie, chapitre I, 3 Deux ouvrages attribués à Ǧa‘far al-Ṣādiq, 10; Modaressi 2003, p. 334. According to Chokr 1993, the true title as given in the work itself is Kitāb al-Adilla ʿalā al-khalq wa-l-tadbīr wa-l-radd ʿalā al-qāʾilīn bi-l-ihmāl wa-munkirī al-ʿamd (The Book on the Proofs of Creation and Administration and on the Refutation of the Supporters of Negligence and the Deniers of Purposefulness).) sets out to prove the existence of God based on the argument from design (also called the teleological argument). The work consists of a series of lectures about the existence and oneness (tawḥīd) of God presented to al-Mufaddal by Ja'far al-Sadiq, who is answering a challenge made to him by the self-declared atheist Ibn Abi al-Awja'. In four "sessions" (majālis), Ja'far argues that the cosmic order and harmony which can be detected throughout nature necessitates the existence of a wise and providential creator. The Twelver Shi'i bibliographer al-Najashi (c. 982–1058) also refers to the work as the Kitāb Fakkir (lit. 'Book of Think'), a reference to the fact that Ja'far often begins his exhortations with the word fakkir (think!).

The Tawḥīd al-Mufaḍḍal is not an original work. Instead, it is a revised version of a work also attributed to the famous Mu'tazili litterateur al-Jahiz (died 868) under the title Kitāb al-Dalāʾil wa-l-iʿtibār ʿalā al-khalq wa-l-tadbīr (Book on the Proofs and Contemplation of Creation and Administration). The attribution of this work to al-Jahiz is probably spurious as well, although the original was likely written in the 9th century. Compared to pseudo-Jahiz's Kitāb al-Dalāʾil, the Tawḥīd al-Mufaḍḍal adds an introduction that sets up a frame story involving al-Mufaddal, Ibn Abi al-Awja', and Ja'far al-Sadiq, as well rhymed praises of God at the beginning of each chapter, and a brief concluding passage.

Scholars have espoused various views on the ultimate origins of this work. According to Melhem Chokr, the versions attributed to al-Mufaddal and to al-Jahiz are both based on an unknown earlier work, with the version attributed to al-Mufaddal being more faithful to the original. In Chokr's view, at some point the work must have been translated by a Syriac author into the Arabic from a Greek original, perhaps from an unknown Hermetic work. However, both Hans Daiber and Josef van Ess identify the original work on which pseudo-Jahiz's Kitāb al-Dalāʾil was based as the Kitāb al-Fikr wa-l-iʿtibār (Book of Thought and Contemplation), written by the 9th-century Nestorian Christian Jibril ibn Nuh ibn Abi Nuh al-Nasrani al-Anbari. However this may be, Jibril ibn Nuh's Kitāb al-Fikr wa-l-iʿtibār, the Tawḥīd al-Mufaḍḍal and pseudo-Jahiz's Kitāb al-Dalāʾil are only the three earliest among many extant versions of the work: adaptations were also made by the Nestorian Christian bishop Elijah of Nisibis (died 1056), by the Sunni mystic al-Ghazali (died 1111), and by the Andalusian Jewish philosopher Bahya ibn Paquda (died first half of 12th century).

The Tawḥīd al-Mufaḍḍal/Kitāb al-Dalāʾil contains many parallels with Syriac Christian literature, especially with the commentaries on the Hexameron (the six days of creation as described in Genesis) written by Jacob of Edessa (c. 640–708) and Moses bar Kepha (c. 813–903), as well as with Job of Edessa's encyclopedic work on natural philosophy called the Book of Treasures (c. 817). Its teleological proof of the existence of God—based upon a discussion of the four elements, minerals, plants, animals, meteorology, and the human being—was likely inspired by pseudo-Aristotle's De mundo (On the Universe, 3rd/2nd century BCE), a work also used by the Syriac authors mentioned above. In particular, the Tawḥīd al-Mufaḍḍal/Kitāb al-Dalāʾil contains the same emphasis on the idea that God, who already in pseudo-Aristotle's De mundo is called "one", can only be known through the wisdom permeating his creative works, while his own essence (kunh) remains hidden for all.

The idea that contemplating the works of nature leads to a knowledge of God is also found in the Quran. However, in the case of the Tawḥīd al-Mufaḍḍal/Kitāb al-Dalāʾil, the idea is set in a philosophical framework that clearly goes back on Hellenistic models. Apart from pseudo-Aristotle's De mundo (3rd/2nd century BCE), there are also many parallels with Cicero's (106–43 BCE) De natura deorum, especially with the Stoic views on teleology and divine providence outlined in Cicero's work. Some of the enemies cited in the work are Diagoras (5th century BCE) and Epicurus (341–270 BCE), both reviled since late antiquity for their alleged atheism, as well as Mani (c. 216–274 or 277 CE, the founding prophet of Manichaeism), a certain Dūsī, and all those who would deny the providence and purposefulness (ʿamd) of God.

=== Kitāb al-Ihlīlaja (Book of the Myrobalan Fruit) ===
The Kitāb al-Ihlīlaja (Book of the Myrobalan Fruit) (Note: Arabic text in al-Majlisi 1983, vol. 3, pp. 152–198 (referred to by Modaressi 2003, p. 334; Asatryan 2000–2012b; Turner 2006, pp. 184, 194, note 43).) is another work in which al-Mufaddal asks Ja'far al-Sadiq to present a proof of the existence and oneness of God in response to those who openly profess atheism. In comparison with the Tawḥīd al-Mufaḍḍal, the frame story here is less well integrated into the main text, which despite being written in the form of an epistle does not directly address al-Mufaddal's concerns about the appearance of people who would publicly deny the existence of God. In the epistle itself, the author (presumed to be Ja'far al-Sadiq) recounts his meeting with an Indian physician, who contended that the world is eternal and therefore does not need a creator. Taking the myrobalan fruit (perhaps the black myrobalan or Terminalia reticulata, a plant used in Ayurveda) that the Indian physician was grinding as a starting point for contemplation, the author of the epistle succeeds in convincing the physician of the existence of God. The dialectical style of the debate is typical of early Muslim speculative theology (kalām). Sciences like astrology and medicine are presented as originating from divine revelation. Melhem Chokr has proposed the 8th-century scribe (kātib) and speculative theologian Muhammad ibn Layth as the original author of the Kitāb al-Ihlīlaja, based on similarities with other works attributed to Ibn Layth, and on the attribution to him in Ibn al-Nadim's (c. 932 – c. 995 or 998) Fihrist of a work called Kitāb al-Ihlīlaja fī al-iʿtibār (Book of the Myrobalan Fruit on Contemplation).

== Other works ==
Some other works attributed to, or transmitted by, al-Mufaddal are still extant:

- The Waṣiyyat al-Mufaḍḍal (Testament of al-Mufaddal) (Note: Arabic text in Hasan ibn Shu'ba al-Harrani's Tuḥaf al-ʿuqūl, ed. al-Ghaffārī Tehran, pp. 513–515 (referred to by Modaressi 2003, p. 334), ed. Beirut 1996, pp. 382–384 (referred to by Asatryan 2017, p. 60, note 71).) is a short text purporting to be al-Mufaddal's testament to the Shi'is of Kufa. The testament itself only contains a rather generic exhortation to piety and proper religious conduct, but it is followed by a paragraph in which Ja'far al-Sadiq reproaches the Kufan Shi'is for their hostility towards al-Mufaddal, exonerating his disciple from all blame. The text may very well be authentic, though it may also have been attributed to al-Mufaddal by later authors seeking to rehabilitate him.
- The Duʿāʾ samāt, also called the Duʿāʾ Shabbūr, (Note: Arabic text in al-Majlisi 1983, vol. 90, pp. 96–101; original Talmudic text in Talmud, Mo’ed Katan, 17a–17b (referred to by Modaressi 2003, p. 336). For other versions of the Arabic text, and for the meaning of the word samāt, see also Modaressi 2003, p. 336.) is a prayer (duʿāʾ) attributed to Ja'far al-Sadiq, supposedly transmitted from Ja'far by al-Mufaddal and later by Muhammad ibn Uthman al-Amri (died 917 or 918), the second deputy of the Hidden Imam Muhammad al-Mahdi during the Minor Occultation (874–941). It is a revised version of an originally Talmudic invocation that was used by Jews to cast off robbers and thieves. It was apparently in use among Muslims during the time of Muhammad ibn Uthman al-Amri, who approved of this practice but said that he had a "fuller" version handed down from the Imam Ja'far al-Sadiq. This version is nearly identical to the version preserved in the Talmud, only adding the names of the prophet Muhammad and some of his family members.
- The Riwāyat al-ruzz wa-mā fīhi min al-faḍl is treatise attributed to al-Mufaddal on the virtue of rice.
- al-Ḥikam al-Jaʿfariyya (Ja'farian Aphorisms) is a collection of moral aphorisms (ḥikam) attributed to Ja'far al-Sadiq and transmitted by al-Mufaddal.

There are also some works attributed to, or transmitted by, al-Mufaddal that are mentioned in other sources but are now lost:

- Kitāb ʿIlal al-Sharāʾiʿ (Book of the Causes of Religious Laws)
- Kitāb Yawm wa-layla (Book of Day and Night)
- Kitāb (Book), a notebook containing hadiths purportedly recorded by al-Mufaddal

== Bibliography ==
=== Tertiary sources ===
- Amir-Moezzi, Mohammad Ali (2007–2012). "Islam in Iran vii. The Concept of Mahdi in Twelver Shiʿism". In Yarshater, Ehsan (ed.). Encyclopædia Iranica.
- Amir-Moezzi, Mohammad Ali (2013). "Ḵaṭṭābiya". In Yarshater, Ehsan (ed.). Encyclopædia Iranica.
- Anthony, Sean W. (2018). "Ghulāt (extremist Shīʿīs)". In Fleet, Kate; Krämer, Gudrun; Matringe, Denis; Nawas, John; Rowson, Everett (eds.). Encyclopaedia of Islam, Three. doi:10.1163/1573-3912_ei3_COM_27473.
- Asatryan, Mushegh (2000–2012a). "Esḥāq Aḥmar Naḵaʿi". In Yarshater, Ehsan (ed.). Encyclopædia Iranica.
- Asatryan, Mushegh (2000–2012b). "Mofażżal al-Joʿfi". In Yarshater, Ehsan (ed.). Encyclopædia Iranica.
- Asatryan, Mushegh (2000–2013). "Moḵammesa". In Yarshater, Ehsan (ed.). Encyclopædia Iranica.
- Daftary, Farhad (1994–2011). "Dawr (1)". In Yarshater, Ehsan (ed.). Encyclopædia Iranica.
- Friedman, Yaron (2000–2010). "Moḥammad b. Noṣayr". In Yarshater, Ehsan (ed.). Encyclopædia Iranica.
- Gleave, Robert (2008–2012). "Jaʿfar al-Ṣādeq ii. Teachings". In Yarshater, Ehsan (ed.). Encyclopædia Iranica.
- Halm, Heinz (2001–2012). "Ḡolāt". In Yarshater, Ehsan (ed.). Encyclopædia Iranica.
- Hodgson, M.G.S. (1960–2007). "Ghulāt". In Bearman, P.; Bianquis, Th.; Bosworth, C.E.; van Donzel, E.; Heinrichs, W.P. (eds.). Encyclopaedia of Islam, Second Edition. doi:10.1163/1573-3912_islam_SIM_2517.
- Kohlberg, Etan (2000). "Ḡażāʾerī". In Yarshater, Ehsan (ed.). Encyclopædia Iranica.
- MacEoin, Denis M. (1988–2011). "Bāb (1)". In Yarshater, Ehsan (ed.). Encyclopædia Iranica.
- Steigerwald, Diana (2010). "Ibn Nuṣayr". In Fleet, Kate; Krämer, Gudrun; Matringe, Denis; Nawas, John; Rowson, Everett (eds.). Encyclopaedia of Islam, Three. doi:10.1163/1573-3912_ei3_COM_23483.

=== Secondary sources ===
- Anthony, Sean W. (2012a). The Caliph and the Heretic: Ibn Sabaʾ and the Origins of Shīʿism. Islamic History and Civilization. Vol. 91. Leiden: Brill. doi:10.1163/9789004216068. ISBN 978-90-04-20930-5.
- Anthony, Sean W. (2012b). "The Mahdī and the Treasures of al-Ṭālaqān". Arabica. 59 (5): 459–483. doi:10.1163/157005812X618907.
- Asatryan, Mushegh (2012). Heresy and Rationalism in Early Islam: The Origins and Evolution of the Mufaḍḍal-Tradition (PhD diss.). Yale University.
- Asatryan, Mushegh (2014). "Bankers and Politics: The Network of Shi'i Moneychangers in Eighth-Ninth Century Kufa and their Role in the Shi'i Community". Journal of Persianate Studies. 7 (1): 1–21. doi:10.1163/18747167-12341262.
- Asatryan, Mushegh (2015). "An Early Shīʿi Cosmology: Kitāb al-ashbāḥ wa l-aẓilla and its Milieu". Studia Islamica. 110: 1–80. doi:10.1163/19585705-12341311.
- Asatryan, Mushegh (2016). "Shiite Underground Literature Between Iraq and Syria: "The Book of Shadows" and the History of the Early Ghulat". In Langermann, Y. Tzvi; Robinson, Robert G. (eds.). Texts in Transit in the Medieval Mediterranean. University Park: Pennsylvania State University Press. pp. 128–161. ISBN 9780271071091.
- Asatryan, Mushegh (2017). Controversies in Formative Shiʿi Islam: The Ghulat Muslims and Their Beliefs. London: I.B. Tauris. ISBN 9781784538958.
- Asatryan, Mushegh (2020). "Early Ismailis and Other Muslims: Polemics and Borrowing in Kitāb al-Kashf". In Mir-Kasimov, Orkhan (ed.). Intellectual Interactions in the Islamic World: The Ismaili Thread. London: I.B. Tauris. pp. 273–298. ISBN 978-1-83860-485-1.
- Capezzone, Leonardo (1993). "Una nuova fonte per lo studio dell'eterodossia islamica: Il Kitāb al-ṣirāṭ attribuito a Mufaḍḍal b. ʿUmar al-Ğuʿfī". Rivista degli studi orientali. 67 (3/4): 265–273. JSTOR 41922961.
- Capezzone, Leonardo (1999). "Un aspetto della critica imamita alle tradizioni eterodosse: il Kitāb al-haft wa'l-azilla e le molteplici redazioni di un Kitāb al-azilla". Annali di Ca' Foscari. 38 (3): 171–193.
- Capezzone, Leonardo (2002). "La questione dell'eterodossia di Mufaḍḍal ibn ʿUmar al-Ğuʿfī nel Tanqīḥ al-Maqāl di al-Māmaqānī". Oriente Moderno. 21 (1): 147–157. doi:10.1163/22138617-08201010. JSTOR 25817817.
- Capezzone, Leonardo (2017). "Pre-existence and Shadows. A Gnostic Motif or a Literary One?". In Hassan, Iyas Hassan (ed.). La littérature aux marges du ʾadab. Regards croisés sur la prose arabe classique. Beirut/Marseille: Diacritiques Éditions/Institut français du Proche-Orient. pp. 336–361. ISBN 979-10-97093-00-6.
- Capezzone, Leonardo (2020). "The Solitude of the Orphan: Ǧābir b. Ḥayyān and the Shiite Heterodox Milieu of the Third/Ninth–Fourth/Tenth Centuries". Bulletin of the School of Oriental and African Studies. 83 (1): 51–73. doi:10.1017/S0041977X20000014. hdl:11573/1362553. S2CID 214044897.
- Chokr, Melhem (1993). Zandaqa et zindīqs en islam au second siècle de l'Hégire. Damascus: Institut français de Damas. doi:10.4000/books.ifpo.5349. ISBN 9782901315025. OCLC 910729151.
- Daiber, Hans (1975). Das theologisch-philosophische System des Mu'ammar ibn 'Abbād as-Sulamī (gest. 830 n. Chr.). Beiruter Texte und Studien. Vol. 19. Beirut/Wiesbaden: Orient-Institut der Deutschen Morgenländischen Gesellschaft. ISBN 3515018409. OCLC 963435324.
- Daiber, Hans (2014). "Possible Echoes of De mundo in the Arabic-Islamic World: Christian, Islamic and Jewish Thinkers". In Thom, Johan C. (ed.). Cosmic Order and Divine Power: Pseudo-Aristotle, On the Cosmos. Tübingen: Mohr Siebeck. pp. 169–180. doi:10.1628/978-3-16-156432-1. ISBN 978-3-16-152809-5.
- De Smet, Daniel (2020). "The Intellectual Interactions of Yemeni Ṭayyibism with the Early Shiʿi Tradition". In Mir-Kasimov, Orkhan (ed.). Intellectual Interactions in the Islamic World: The Ismaili Thread. London: I.B. Tauris. pp. 299–321. ISBN 978-1-83860-485-1.
- Friedman, Yaron (2010). The Nuṣayrī-ʿAlawīs: An Introduction to the Religion, History and Identity of the Leading Minority in Syria. Islamic History and Civilization. Vol. 77. Leiden: Brill. doi:10.1163/ej.9789004178922.i-328. ISBN 978-90-04-17892-2.
- Furley, David J. (1989). "Aristotelian material in Cicero's De natura deorum". In Fortenbaugh, William W.; Steinmetz, Peter (eds.). Cicero's Knowledge of the Peripatos. Rutgers University Studies in Classical Humanities. Vol. IV. New Brunswick: Transaction Publishers. pp. 201–219. doi:10.4324/9780429336461. ISBN 9780429336461. S2CID 169943525.
- Halm, Heinz (1978). "Das "Buch der Schatten". Die Mufaḍḍal-Tradition der Ġulāt und die Ursprünge des Nuṣairiertums. I. Die Überlieferer der häretischen Mufaḍḍal-Tradition". Der Islam. 55 (2): 219–266. doi:10.1515/islm.1978.55.2.219. S2CID 160481806.
- Halm, Heinz (1981). "Das "Buch der Schatten". Die Mufaḍḍal-Tradition der Ġulāt und die Ursprünge des Nuṣairiertums. II. Die Stoffe". Der Islam. 58 (1): 15–86. doi:10.1515/islm.1981.58.1.15. S2CID 162219074.
- Kohlberg, Etan (1976). "From Imāmiyya to Ithnā-ʿAshariyya". Bulletin of the School of Oriental and African Studies. 39 (3): 521–534. doi:10.1017/S0041977X00050989. JSTOR 614712. S2CID 155070530.
- Kohlberg, Etan (1992). A Medieval Muslim Scholar at Work: Ibn Ṭāwūs and his Library. Leiden: Brill. doi:10.1163/9789004451162. ISBN 978-90-04-09549-6.
- Kraus, Paul (1942). "Les dignitaires de la hiérarchie religieuse selon Ǧābir ibn Ḥayyān". Bulletin de l'institut français d'archéologie orientale. 41: 83–97.
- Madelung, Wilferd (1963). "Kitab-al-haft wa'l-azilla (book review)". Der Islam. 38: 180–182.
- Modaressi, Hossein (2003). Tradition and Survival: A Bibliographical Survey of Early Shīʿite Literature. Oxford: Oneworld. ISBN 1-85168-331-3.
- Obbink, Dirk (1989). "The Atheism of Epicurus". Greek, Roman, and Byzantine Studies. 30 (2): 187–223.
- Sezgin, Fuat (1967). Geschichte des arabischen Schrifttums, Band I: Qur'ānwissenschaften, Ḥadīṯ, Geschichte, Fiqh, Dogmatik, Mystik. Bis ca. 430 H. Leiden: Brill. ISBN 978-90-04-02007-8.
- Turner, Colin P. (2006). "The "Tradition of Mufaḍḍal" and the Doctrine of the Rajʿa: Evidence of Ghuluww in the Eschatology of Twelver Shiʿism?". Iran. 44: 175–195. doi:10.1080/05786967.2006.11834685. JSTOR 4300708. S2CID 170603436.
- Van Ess, Josef (1980). "Early Islamic Theologians on the Existence of God". In Semaan, Khalil I. (ed.). Islam and the Medieval West: Aspects of Intercultural Relations. Papers Presented at the Ninth Annual Conference of the Center for Medieval and Early Renaissance Studies, State University of New York at Binghamton. Albany: State University of New York Press. pp. 64–81. ISBN 0-87395-409-2. (reprinted in Van Ess, Josef (2018). Kleine Schriften. Leiden: Brill. pp. 1431–1445. doi:10.1163/9789004336483_099. ISBN 978-90-04-31224-1.)
- Winiarczyk, Marek (2016). Diagoras of Melos: A Contribution to the History of Ancient Atheism. Beiträge zur Altertumskunde. Vol. 350. Translated by Zbirohowski-Kościa, Witold. Berlin and Boston: De Gruyter. doi:10.1515/9783110448047. ISBN 978-3-11-044377-6.

=== Primary sources ===
Kitāb al-Haft wa-l-aẓilla

- Asatryan, Mushegh (2020). "Early Ismailis and Other Muslims: Polemics and Borrowing in Kitāb al-Kashf". In Mir-Kasimov, Orkhan (ed.). Intellectual Interactions in the Islamic World: The Ismaili Thread. London: I.B. Tauris. pp. 273–298. ISBN 978-1-83860-485-1. (pp. 196–198 contain a critical edition of chapter 59)
- Ghālib, Muṣṭafā (1964). al-Haft al-Sharīf. Beirut: Dār al-Andalus. OCLC 977409505.
- Tāmir, ʿĀrif; Khalifé, Ignace Abdo (1960). Kitāb al-Haft wa-l-'Aẓillat, attribué à al-Mufaḍḍal ibn ʻUmar al-Ǧaʻfī, rapportant les paroles de l'Imām Ǧaʻfar ibn M. aṣ-Ṣādiq. Beirut: Impr. Catholique. OCLC 459827793.
- Tāmir, ʿĀrif (2007) [1981]. Kitāb al-haft wa-l-aẓilla. Beirut: Dār wa-Maktabat al-Hilāl. ISBN 978-9953-75-266-2. (edition based on a different ms. compared to Tāmir & Khalifé 1960)

Kitāb al-Ṣirāṭ

- Capezzone, Leonardo (1995). "Il Kitāb al-Ṣirāṭ attribuito a Mufaḍḍal ibn ʿUmar al-Ğuʿfī: Edizione del ms. unico (Paris, Bibliothèque Nationale Ar. 1449/3) e studio introduttivo". Rivista degli studi orientali. 69 (3–4): 295–416. JSTOR 41880880.
- Ibn ʿAbd al-Jalīl, al-Munṣif (2005). Kitāb al-Ṣirāṭ. Beirut: Dār al-Madār al-Islāmī. ISBN 9789959292636. OCLC 812186733.

Other

- Abū Mūsā; al-Shaykh Mūsā, eds. (2006). Silsilat al-turath al-ʿalawī. Vol. 6: al-Majmūʿa al-Mufaḍḍaliyya. Diyār ʿAql (Lebanon): Dār li-Ajl al-Maʿrifa. OCLC 652937966.
- al-Majlisi, Muhammad Baqir (1983). Biḥār al-anwār al-jāmiʿa li-durar akhbār al-aʾimma al-aṭhār. Beirut: Dār Iḥyāʾ al-Turāth al-ʿArabī. (Tawḥīd al-Mufaḍḍal in vol. 3, pp. 57–151; Kitāb al-Ihlīlaja in vol. 3, pp. 152–198; Mā yakūn ʿinda ẓuhūr al-Mahdī in vol. 53, pp. 1–38)
- Tāmir, ʿĀrif (1957). al-Ḥikam al-Jaʿfariyya, li-l-Imām al-Ṣādiq Jaʿfar ibn Muḥammad. Beirut: al-Maṭbaʿa al-Kāthūlīkiyya. OCLC 23505958.
