= Tawhid al-Mufaddal =

Early Shi'i book on the existence of God

Tawḥīd al-Mufaḍḍal
- توحيد المفضل
- Author: unknown (pseudepigraphic)
- Attributed to: al-Mufaddal ibn Umar al-Ju'fi (d. before 799); Ja'far al-Sadiq (c. 700–765)
- Tradition: Early Shi'ism
- Dating: 9th century
- Language: Arabic
- Alternate title: Kitāb fī badʾ al-khalq wa-l-ḥathth ʿalā al-iʿtibār
- Subject: Teleological proof of the existence of God
- Influenced by: De mundo (pseudo-Aristotle); Stoic theology; Syriac Christian literature; Mu'tazilism
- Related texts: Kitāb al-Fikr wa-l-iʿtibār (Jibril ibn Nuh); Kitāb al-Dalāʾil (pseudo-Jahiz); Risāla fī ḥudūth al-ʿālam (Elijah of Nisibis); al-Ḥikma fī makhlūqāt Allāh (al-Ghazali); Kitāb al-Hidāya (Bahya ibn Paquda)
- Preserved in: Twelver Shi'ism (al-Majlisi)

The Tawḥīd al-Mufaḍḍal (توحيد المفضل, 'Declaration by al-Mufaddal of the Oneness of God'), also known as the Kitāb fī badʾ al-khalq wa-l-ḥathth ʿalā al-iʿtibār ('Book on the Beginning of Creation and the Incitement to Contemplation'), is a ninth-century treatise concerned with proving the existence of God, attributed to the early Shi'i Muslim leader al-Mufaddal ibn Umar al-Ju'fi (died before 799). The work presents itself as a dialogue between al-Mufaddal and the Shi'i Imam Ja'far al-Sadiq (c. 700–765), who is the main speaker.

Like most other works attributed to al-Mufaddal, the Tawḥīd al-Mufaḍḍal was in fact written by a later, anonymous author who took advantage of al-Mufaddal's status as one of the closest confidants of Ja'far al-Sadiq in order to ascribe their own ideas to the illustrious Imam. However, it differs from other treatises attributed to al-Mufaddal by the absence of any content that is specifically Shi'i in nature, a trait it shares with only one other Mufaddal work—also dealing with a rational proof for the existence of God—the Kitāb al-Ihlīlaja ('Book of the Myrobalan Fruit'). Though both preserved by the 17th-century Shi'i scholar Muhammad Baqir al-Majlisi (died 1699), the only thing that connects the Tawḥīd al-Mufaḍḍal and the Kitāb al-Ihlīlaja to Shi'ism more generally is their ascription to Ja'far al-Sadiq and al-Mufaddal. Rather than by Shi'i doctrine, their content appears to be influenced by Mu'tazilism, a rationalistic school of Islamic speculative theology (kalām).

The Tawḥīd al-Mufaḍḍal is a revised version of a work falsely attributed to the famous Mu'tazili litterateur al-Jahiz (died 868) under the title Kitāb al-Dalāʾil wa-l-iʿtibār ʿalā al-khalq wa-l-tadbīr ('Book of Proofs and Contemplation on Creation and Administration'). Both the Tawḥīd al-Mufaḍḍal and pseudo-Jahiz's Kitāb al-Dalāʾil likely go back on an earlier ninth-century text, which has sometimes been identified as the Kitāb al-Fikr wa-l-iʿtibār ('Book of Thought and Contemplation') written by the ninth-century Nestorian Christian Jibril ibn Nuh ibn Abi Nuh al-Nasrani al-Anbari.

The teleological argument for the existence of God used in the Tawḥīd al-Mufaḍḍal is inspired by Syriac Christian literature (especially commentaries on the Hexameron), and ultimately goes back on Hellenistic models such as the pseudo-Aristotelian De mundo ('On the Universe', third/second century BCE) and Stoic theology as recorded in Cicero's (106–43 BCE) De natura deorum.

== Contents ==
The work sets out to prove the existence of God based on the argument from design (also called the teleological argument). It consists of a series of lectures about the existence and oneness (tawḥīd) of God presented to al-Mufaddal by Ja'far al-Sadiq, who is answering a challenge made to him by the self-declared atheist Ibn Abi al-Awja'. In four 'sessions' (majālis), Ja'far argues that the cosmic order and harmony which can be detected throughout nature necessitates the existence of a wise creator. The Twelver Shi'i bibliographer al-Najashi (c. 982–1058) also refers to the work as the Kitāb Fakkir (lit. 'Book of think'), a reference to the fact that Ja'far often begins his exhortation with the word fakkir (think!).

The Tawḥīd al-Mufaḍḍal is in fact not an original work. Instead, it is a revised version of a work also attributed to the famous Mu'tazili litterateur al-Jahiz (died 868) under the title Kitāb al-Dalāʾil wa-l-iʿtibār ʿalā al-khalq wa-l-tadbīr ('Book of Proofs and Contemplation on Creation and Administration'). The attribution of this work to al-Jahiz is probably spurious as well, though it was still likely written in the ninth century. Compared to pseudo-Jahiz's Kitāb al-Dalāʾil, the Tawḥīd al-Mufaḍḍal adds an introduction that sets up the frame story involving al-Mufaddal, Ibn Abi al-Awja', and Ja'far al-Sadiq, as well rhymed praises of God at the beginning of each chapter, and a brief concluding passage. According to Melhem Chokr, the versions attributed to al-Mufaddal and to al-Jahiz are both based on an unknown earlier work, with the version attributed to al-Mufaddal being more faithful to the original. Both Hans Daiber and Josef van Ess identify this original work as the Kitāb al-Fikr wa-l-iʿtibār ('Book of Thought and Contemplation'), written by the ninth-century Nestorian Christian Jibril ibn Nuh ibn Abi Nuh al-Nasrani al-Anbari. In any case, Jibril ibn Nuh's Kitāb al-Fikr wa-l-iʿtibār, the Tawḥīd al-Mufaḍḍal and pseudo-Jahiz's Kitāb al-Dalāʾil are only the three earliest among many extant versions of the work: adaptations were also made by the Nestorian Christian bishop Elijah of Nisibis (died 1056) in his Risāla fī ḥudūth al-ʿālam wa-waḥdāniyyat al-khāliq wa-tathlīth al-aqānīm, by the Sunni mystic al-Ghazali (died 1111) in his al-Ḥikma fī makhlūqāt Allāh, and by the Andalusian Jewish philosopher Bahya ibn Paquda (died first half of 12th century) in his Kitāb al-Hidāya ilā farāʾiḍ al-qulūb.

The Tawḥīd al-Mufaḍḍal/Kitāb al-Dalāʾil contains many parallels with Syriac Christian literature, such as the commentaries on the Hexameron (the six days of creation as described in Genesis) written by Jacob of Edessa (c. 640–708) and Moses bar Kepha (c. 813–903), as well as Job of Edessa's encyclopedic work on natural philosophy called the Book of Treasures (c. 817). Its teleological proof of the existence of God—based upon a discussion of the four elements, minerals, plants, animals, meteorology, and the human being—was likely inspired by the pseudo-Aristotelian work De mundo ('On the Universe', third/second century BCE), a work also used by the Syriac authors mentioned above. In particular, the Tawḥīd al-Mufaḍḍal/Kitāb al-Dalāʾil contains the same emphasis on the idea that God, who already in the De mundo is called "one", can only be known through the wisdom permeating his creative works, while his own essence (kunh) remains hidden for all.

The idea that contemplating the works of nature leads to a knowledge of God is also found in the Quran. However, in the case of the Tawḥīd al-Mufaḍḍal/Kitāb al-Dalāʾil, the idea is set in a philosophical framework that clearly goes back on Hellenistic models. Apart from the De mundo (3rd/2nd century BCE), there are also many parallels with Cicero's (106–43 BCE) De natura deorum, especially with the Stoic views on teleology and divine providence outlined in Cicero's work. According to Melhem Chokr, the original on which both the Tawḥīd al-Mufaḍḍal and the Kitāb al-Dalāʾil were based was translated into Arabic from the Greek, perhaps from an unknown Hermetic work. Some of the enemies cited in the work are Diagoras (5th century BCE) and Epicurus (341–270 BCE), both reviled since late antiquity for their alleged atheism, as well as Mani (c. 216–274 or 277 CE), the founding prophet of Manichaeism; a certain Dūsī, and all those who would deny the providence and purposefullness (Arabic: ʿamd) of God.

== Reception ==
Often transmitted together in the manuscripts, both the Tawḥīd al-Mufaḍḍal and the Kitāb al-Ihlīlaja may be regarded as part of an attempt to rehabilitate al-Mufaddal in the Twelver Shi'i tradition. Al-Mufaddal was known to have for some time been a follower of Abu al-Khattab (died 755), a leader of the early branch of Shi'ism known as the ghulāt ('exaggerators', thus known for their supposed 'exaggerated' veneration of the Imams). Many treatises attributed to al-Mufaddal also belong to the tradition of the ghulāt. Twelver Shi'is generally rejected the ideas of the ghulāt, but al-Mufaddal was important to them as a narrator of numerous hadiths from the Imams Ja'far al-Sadiq and his son Musa al-Kazim. Apart from al-Majlisi (died 1699), both works were also known to such Twelver scholars as al-Najashi (c. 982–1058), Ibn Shahrashub (died 1192), Ibn Tawus (1193–1266).

== Bibliography ==
=== English translations ===
- Yazd, Ali Zakerzadeh (2026). The Wonders of Creation, or "Tawhid Al-Mofazzal". Self-published.

=== Sources used ===
- al-Majlisi, Muhammad Baqir (1983). Biḥār al-anwār al-jāmiʿa li-durar akhbār al-aʾimma al-aṭhār. Beirut: Dār Iḥyāʾ al-Turāth al-ʿArabī. (Tawḥīd al-Mufaḍḍal in vol. 3, pp. 57–151; Kitāb al-Ihlīlaja in vol. 3, pp. 152–198)
- Asatryan, Mushegh (2000–2012). "Mofażżal al-Joʿfi". In Yarshater, Ehsan (ed.). Encyclopædia Iranica.
- Asatryan, Mushegh (2017). Controversies in Formative Shiʿi Islam: The Ghulat Muslims and Their Beliefs. London: I.B. Tauris. ISBN 9781784538958.
- Chokr, Melhem (1993). Zandaqa et zindīqs en islam au second siècle de l'Hégire. Damascus: Institut français de Damas. doi:10.4000/books.ifpo.5349. ISBN 9782901315025. OCLC 910729151.
- Daiber, Hans (1975). Das theologisch-philosophische System des Mu‘ammar ibn ‘Abbād as-Sulamī (gest. 830 n. Chr.). Beiruter Texte und Studien. Vol. 19. Beirut/Wiesbaden: Orient-Institut der Deutschen Morgenländischen Gesellschaft. ISBN 3515018409. OCLC 963435324.
- Daiber, Hans (2014). "Possible Echoes of De mundo in the Arabic-Islamic World: Christian, Islamic and Jewish Thinkers". In Thom, Johan C. (ed.). Cosmic Order and Divine Power: Pseudo-Aristotle, On the Cosmos. Tübingen: Mohr Siebeck. pp. 169–180. doi:10.1628/978-3-16-156432-1. ISBN 978-3-16-152809-5.
- Gleave, Robert (2008–2012). "Jaʿfar al-Ṣādeq ii. Teachings". In Yarshater, Ehsan (ed.). Encyclopædia Iranica.
- Kohlberg, Etan (1992). A Medieval Muslim Scholar at Work: Ibn Ṭāwūs and his Library. Leiden: Brill. doi:10.1163/9789004451162. ISBN 978-90-04-09549-6.
- Modaressi, Hossein (2003). Tradition and Survival: A Bibliographical Survey of Early Shīʿite Literature. Oxford: Oneworld. ISBN 1-85168-331-3.
- Sezgin, Fuat (1967). Geschichte des arabischen Schrifttums, Band I: Qur’ānwissenschaften, Ḥadīṯ, Geschichte, Fiqh, Dogmatik, Mystik. Bis ca. 430 H. Leiden: Brill. ISBN 978-90-04-02007-8.
- Turner, Colin P. (2006). "The "Tradition of Mufaḍḍal" and the Doctrine of the Rajʿa: Evidence of Ghuluww in the Eschatology of Twelver Shiʿism?". Iran. 44: 175–195. JSTOR 4300708.
- Van Ess, Josef (1980). "Early Islamic Theologians on the Existence of God". In Semaan, Khalil I. (ed.). Islam and the Medieval West: Aspects of Intercultural Relations. Papers Presented at the Ninth Annual Conference of the Center for Medieval and Early Renaissance Studies, State University of New York at Binghamton. Albany: State University of New York Press. pp. 64–81. ISBN 0-87395-409-2. (reprinted in Van Ess, Josef (2018). Kleine Schriften. Leiden: Brill. pp. 1431–1445. doi:10.1163/9789004336483_099. ISBN 978-90-04-31224-1.)
