= Fazl =

Arabic word meaning grace or virtue

Fazl (Arabic: فضل) is an Arabic word meaning grace or virtue. It may also be transliterated as Fadl, or with the addition of an extra vowel. It is used as a given name, and also as a constituent of several compound names. Examples are:

== Constituent of compound names ==
- Al-Fadl - the bounty
- Abu'l-Fadl - father of virtue
- Fazlallah - bounty of Allah
- Fazlul Haq - bounty of the Truth
- Fazlul Karim - bounty of the Generous One
- Fazl ur Rahman - bounty of the Merciful One

== Used as free-standing name ==
- Fazal, with list of names using that transliteration
- Fadel, with list of names using that or similar transliteration

== Related names ==
- Tafazzul (disambiguation)
- Mufaddal (disambiguation)
- Afzal (disambiguation)
