= Tafsir al-Ayyashi =

Imami Shia tafsir

- Author: Mohammad ibn Masoud al-Ayyashi
- Original title: تفسير العياشي
- Language: Arabic
- Subject: Quranic exegesis
- Genre: Religious
- Media type: Print

Tafsir Ayyashi (Arabic: تفسیر العیاشي) is an Imami Shia exegesis of the Quran, written by Mohammad ibn Masoud Ayyashi also known as al-ʿAyyashi (العيّاشي d. 320 AH / 932 CE).

The surviving text covers only up to the end of sura 18, 'The Cave'; more material is quoted by later Imami scholars, for instance Tabrisi. As of the 18th century, al-Majlisi and Al-Hurr al-Aamili were not aware of the complete text of Ayyashi's work.

Similar to Tafsir Furat Kufi and Tafsir Qomi, this work is a collection of commentaries upon selected verses, not a unified commentary of the entire text. Many of its single-verse commentaries also exist, independently of ʿAyyashi, in al-Kulayni's al-kafi and al-Hakim al-Hasakani's Shawahid al-tanzil. Many of these hadiths were taken from al-Sayyari's Kitab al-Qiraat; others, from the lost tafasir of Jabir ibn Yazid al-Juʿfi and Abu'l-Jarud Ziyad ibn al-Mundhir (technically a Zaydi, founder of the Jarudiyya). Correlation with the Shawahid hints at Sunni material as well.

ʿAyyashi accepted hadiths that held that there had been alteration (tahrif) in the ʿUthmanic mushaf of the Qur'an. He also was interested in apocalyptic material, which he brought to Q. 2:148, 155 (but not 243); 3:83; 6:158 (not 65); 8:39; 9:33; 11:8; 16:1; 17:4–8. The focus of his work however was in jurisprudence, the ayat al-ahkam.

The first complete translation into English of the Tafsir al-Ayyashi was published in 2020 by the AMI Press as a bi-lingual scholarly text edition.
