= Basa'ir ad-Darajat =

Shi'ite hadith collection

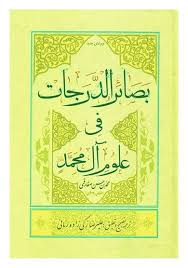
- Author: Shaykh aṣ-Ṣaffār al-Qummī
- Language: Arabic
- Genre: Hadith
- Publication date: 10th century CE

Baṣāʾir ad-Darajāt fī ʿUlūm ʾĀl Muḥammad wa-mā khaṣṣahum Allāh bihi (Arabic: بَصَائِر ٱلدَّرَجَات فِي عُلُوم آل مُحَمَّد وَمَا خَصَّهُم ٱلله بِهِ), alternatively known as Baṣāʾir ad-Darajāt al-Kubrā fī Faḍāʾil ʾĀl Muḥammad (Arabic: بَصَائِر ٱلدَّرَجَات ٱلْكُبْرَىٰ فِي فَضَائِل آل مُحَمَّد), is a Hadith compilation considered to be one of the oldest books in Hadith among Shias. The book's author is Abū Jaʿfar Muḥammad ibn al-Ḥasan ibn Farrūkh al-ʾAʿraj (Arabic: ‌أبو جعفر [أو أبو الحسن] محمد بن الحسن بن فروخ الأعرج), popularly known as Shaykh aṣ-Ṣaffār al-Qummī (Arabic: ‌الشيخ الصفار القمي) (d. 290 AH / 902-903 CE)

== Author ==
Abu Jaʿfar Muhammad ibn al-Hasan ibn Farrukh al-Araj, popularly known as Sheikh as-Saffar al-Qummi (d. 290 AH / 902-903 CE), was a contemporary of the tenth and eleventh Imams. He was probably the disciple of the eleventh, and an acquaintance of his son, Imam Mahdi. He was one of the earliest systematic compilers of Hadiths about Imamat Theology, constituting the basis of early Twelver metaphysics and mystical theology. His greatest work, which is also the only one that has survived, is Baṣāʾir ad-Darajāt fi ʿUlūm ʾĀle Muḥammad wa-mā khaṣṣahumu—Allāh. It was edited in Iran under the title Baṣaʾir ad-Darajāt al-Kubrā fī Faḍāʾil ʾĀle Muḥammad. In addition to being a Hadith compiler, Sheikh as-Saffar al-Qummi is himself also known as a prominent narrator of Hadith.

== Characteristics ==
The book includes 1881 Hadiths. The book is divided into ten original parts, with such each part having 10 or 24 subdivisions. Sheikh as-Saffar al-Qummi presents the narrations methodically by grouping details in independent chapters. Some scholars have stated that Basa'ir ad-Darajat is the oldest large-scale compilation of Shia Hadiths.

== Contents ==
Basa'ir ad-Darajat is a hadith collection with a theological approach whose Hadiths are about the Imamate, how to know an Imam (a) and the virtues of Ahl al-Bayt (Household of Prophet)). Shaikh as-Saffar al-Qummi begins his book with the famous Hadith "The search for science is a religious duty for every Muslim. Allah loves those who ardently search for knowledge".

== His Teachers ==
Apart from Imam al-Hasan al-'Askari (a), al-Saffar quoted hadiths from prominent hadith transmitters, such as

- Ibrahim b. Hashim al-Qummi (Father of the Author of Tafseer Qummi: Ali b. Ibrahim)
- Ahmad b. Muhammad b. Khalid al-Barqi (Author of Mahasin)
- Ahmad b. Muhammad b. 'Isa al-Ash'ari

== Authenticity ==
Al-Hurr al-Amilii in preface of his book Wasailus Shia says: “Basa'ir ad-Darajat is a well reliable book”. Allameh Majlisi in Preface of Bihar-ul-Anwar says: ”The book Basa'ir ad-Darajat is very authentic book from where scholars like Shaikh Kulayni and others have narrated”. Mohaddis-e- Noori at the end of Mustadrakul Wasail says: “Saffar is a respected and reliable narrators of Ahadith and his book Basa'ir ad-Darajat is well authenticated”. However, some of the book's narrations have also been reported in authentic books, such as Al-Kafi.
