= Al-Ayyashi =

Shia Islam scholar from third century AH

Muḥammad ibn Mas'ūd al-ʾAyyāshi
- مُحَمَّد بن مَسْعُود العَیّاشي السَّمَرقَنْدي

Personal life
- Born: 9th century Samarkand
- Died: 932
- Region: Kufa, Baghdad, Qom and Samarqand
- Main interest(s): Ḥadīth, Tafsir
- Notable work: Tafsir Ayyashi

Religious life
- Religion: Islam
- Denomination: Twelver Shia
- Jurisprudence: Ja'fari

Muslim leader
- Teacher: Ali ibn Faddal
- Influenced: Muhammad ibn Umar al-Kashshi

Muḥammad ibn Mas'ūd al-ʾAyyāshi al-Samarqandi (Persian: محمد بن مسعود عیاشی سمرقندى) (Arabic: مُحَمَّد بن مَسْعُود العَیّاشي السَّمَرقَنْدي) (probably died on 932), known as Ayyashi (Persian: عیاشی), was a 10th century Twelver Shia Muslim scholar, jurist (faqīh) and mufassir from Samarkand. He had many known works in the field of exegesis of the Quran, Fiqh (Islamic jurisprudence), Arabic literature and hadith. His exegesis of the Quran, known as Tafsir Ayyashi, is his most famous book.

== Birthplace and lineage ==
His full name was Mohammad ibn Masoud ibn Mohammad Ayyashi Salami Samarqandi (Persian: محمد بن مسعود بن محمد عیاشی سلمی سمرقندی) or Mohammad ibn Masoud Ayyashi Iraqi Kufi (Persian: محمد ابن مسعود بن عیاشی عراقی کوفی) and his kunya or teknonymy was Abu Nazr (Persian: ابوالنضر). From the date of his birth and the birthplace of him, has not been recorded in history and only he has been mentioned as Samarkandi, Iraqi and Kufi. However, there is a narration which tells he was from Tamimi tribe. The great Shiite and Sunni scholars, such as: Ibn al-Nadim, Shaykh Tusi, Najashi, Ibn Shahr Ashub, Allamah Al-Hilli, Ibn Davoud Hilli, Abdollah Mamaghani, Muhammad Ardabili, Abbas Qomi, Agha Bozorg Tehrani and Seyyed Hassan Sadr consider him from Samarkand in Transoxiana

The father of Mohammad ibn Masoud Ayyashi was from a wealthy and well-known family in Samarkand. All of his fund was three hundred thousand dinars of the common currency of that era. His son, Mohammad ibn Masoud Ayyashi, spent all of the fund in spreading Islam science and literature and promoting the culture of Ahl al-Bayt.

Mohammad ibn Masoud Ayyashi was proficient in fields such as Fiqh, Politeness, Tafsir and Hadith and was considered one of the leading contemporary Shiite scholars with Muhammad ibn Ya'qub al-Kulayni. Mohammad Ali Modarres Tabrizi said that Muhammad ibn Umar al-Kashshi, the author of famous rijali book Rijal al-Kashshi, was one of the Ayyashi 's disciples. Modarres Tabrizi has also said that Ayyashi in sciences such as medicine, astronomy and jurisprudence has more than 200 volumes of books. Tafsir Ayyashi is one of his most important books, which is based on the assertions and hadiths of the Twelve Shiite Imams.

== Education and career ==
Ayashi was originally Sunni due to his birth in a predominantly Sunni area (which was around Samarkand and Bukhara), but after researching Shiite works, he converted to Shiism. He then traveled to Kufa, Baghdad and Qom to study Islamic sciences.

After studying in the theological seminary of Kufa, Baghdad and Qom, Ayyashi returned to Samarkand and taught and promoted religious and Shiite teachings at his house. It is said that his house, like a mosque, was full of Quran readers, hadith narrators, scholars, students and commentators. He held two sessions: a scientific meeting for the general public and another assembly for the students.

== Bibliography ==
Two hundred and eight works in various scientific fields such as history, jurisprudence, literature, exegesis and astronomy have been mentioned for Ayyashi. Unfortunately, most of his works have been lost. The remaining book Tafsir Ayyashi includes only the first half of it up to Al-Kahf Sura, which was available in the cities of Mashhad, Zanjan, Tabriz and Kadhimiya. The masters of these versions have been removed for brevity. Therefore, only the first volume of his exegesis works remains. Muhammad Husayn Tabatabai has spoken about the possibility of a second volume of the Tafsir Ayyashi in the southern regions of Iran. Some of his other works are as follows:

- Mecca and the sanctuary in biography study (Persian: مکه و الحرم در سیره شناسی)
- Opponents in poetry (Persian: المعاریض در شعر)
- Poetry book (Persian: کتاب شعر)
- The prophets and the saints (Arabic: الانبیاء و الاولیاء)
- Biography of Abi Bakr (Persian: سیره ابی بکر)
- Biography of Umar (Persian: سیره عمر)
- Biography of Uthman (Persian: سیره عثمان)
- Biography of Muawiyah (Persian: سیره معاویه)
- The Prayer (Arabic: الصلوة)
- The Ritual purity (Arabic: الطهارة)
- Brief of the Prayer (Arabic: مختصر الصلوة)
- The Funerals (Arabic: الجنائز)
- Brief of the Funerals (Arabic: مختصر الجنائز)
- The Rites (Arabic: المناسک)
- The scientist and the learner (Arabic: العالم و المتعلم)
- The Invitations (Arabic: الدعوات)
- The Zakat (Arabic: الزکاة)
- The Drinks (Arabic: الاشربة)
- The limit of sacrificial charity (Arabic: حد الشار الاضاحی)

== Ayyashi from the perspective of others ==
Mohammad ibn Masoud al-Ayyashi was a follower of the popular religion at the beginning of his youth and heard hadith from their elders. After studying and researching, he joined the Imamiyya religion and gained knowledge from masters such as: Ali ibn al-Hassan ibn Fadhal and Abdullah ibn Muhammad ibn Khalid Tayalisi and a number of elders of Kufa, Baghdad and Qom.

— Ahmad ibn Ali al-Najashi (982–1058)

Mohammad ibn Masoud Ayyashi ... was one of the Imami jurists who was considered the only one of his time in the field of science and his books were very important in Khorasan. Junaid ibn Naeem, known as Abu Ahmad, mentions his compositions in his dissertation written for Abu al-Hasan Ali ibn Muhammad Alavi.

— Ibn al-Nadim (~932-~995)

Mohammad ibn Masoud ibn Mohammad ibn Ayyashi Samarkandi, his kunya Abu al-Nazar, among the scholars of the East (Khorasan and Transoxiana) in terms of knowledge, grace, literature, understanding and greatness was the highest of all the scholars of his time. He has more than two hundred ballads.

— Shaykh Tusi (995-1067)

Mohammad ibn Masoud Ayyashi is from Samarkand. He is said to be from the tribe of Bani Tamim. He is unique in the Orient in terms of grace and wisdom and has written more than 20 volumes of books, including: Kitab al-Tafsir, Al-Alam wa Al-Muttalim, Al-Dawaat, Al-Taqiya, Al-Jawbah Al-Muscat and Tajweed Al-Quran.

— Ibn Shahr Ashub (1096-1192)

Mohammad ibn Masoud ibn Mohammad ibn Ayyash Salami Samarkandi, known as Ayyashi, was from the honest and the brilliant figures, one of the prominent figures of this tribe (Shia) and one of their elders.

— Hasan ibn Davoud Hilli (1249-~1340)

Mohammad ibn Masoud was one of the Imami Shiite jurists and one of the most diligent contemporary scholars and one of the roaring springs of knowledge whose works had a high status and fame in Khorasan.

— Abdollah Mamaqani (1873-1933)

Mohammad ibn Masoud ibn Ayyash Salami Samarkandi, known as Ayyashi, from the tribe of Bani Tamimi, was a great person, full of knowledge, an expert of narration and the man of trust and confidence. Among the Imami eminents, he was famous.

— Muhammad Ardabili (1648-?)

Mohammad ibn Masoud ibn Mohammad ibn Ayyash, Iraqi, Kufi, Samarkandi, Tamimi, his kunya Abu Nadr, known as Ayyashi, Sheikh, scholar, scholarly, litterateur, exegesisor, muhaddith, honest and trusted among Shia scholars and Imami eminents of contemporary with Muhammad ibn Ya'qub al-Kulayni... in science, grace, understanding, literature, mastery and scientific diversity was the best of his time... and was insightful in the principles of narration, in medicine, astronomy, appearance and dream, for each of the chapters of Islamic jurisprudence has written more than two hundred books... .

— Mohammad Ali Modarres Tabrizi (1878–1954)

Ayyashi Mohammad ibn Masoud is one of the great men of our companions who is very famous for his many compositions and writings, and from the books he has in the field of biography and history is the books "Mecca" and "Haram" and so on. He is mentioned in the line of contemporary with Muhammad ibn Ya'qub al-Kulayni and the scholars of the third century AH.

— Seyyed Hassan Sadr (1856-1935)

He is one of the elders of our companions who gained insight as a teenager and turned to the Imami religion and jurisprudence. He was one of the students of Ali ibn Husayn ibn Ali ibn Fadhal and some other elders of Kufa, Baghdad and Qom. In the way of knowledge and hadith, he spent what he had inherited from his father... .

— Abbas Qomi (1877-1941)

Mohammad ibn Masoud ibn Mohammad Ayyashi, nicknamed Abu Nadr Salami Samarkandi, known as Ayyashi, has 200 writings and has heard hadith from our companions such as: Ali ibn Husayn ibn Ali ibn Fadhal... .

— Agha Bozorg Tehrani (1876–1970)

...Mohammad ibn Masoud is one of the scholars who lived in the late third century AH. All the scholars who have come after him have praised Ayyashi as the majesty, the exaltation, and the breadth of grace. Scholars of rijal have identified him as trustworthy, discerning, honest and truthful in his hadith... He became skilled in various scientific disciplines such as: Fiqh and hadith, medicine, astronomy, etc... .

— Muhammad Husayn Tabatabai (1903-1981)

Another well-known jurist of that time, who is contemporary with Ali ibn Babawayh Qummi (died 939), but he has a slight precedence in time. Ayyashi Samarqandi is the author of famous Quran exegesis. He was a comprehensive man. Although he is known for his exegesis, he is considered one of the jurists... .

— Morteza Motahhari (1919-1979)

== Demise ==
The exact date of death of Mohammad ibn Masoud Ayyashi, despite all the investigations that have been carried out, has not been determined yet, only Al-Zirikli, author of al-Aʻlām, has considered the death date of Ayyashi in 932 AD (320 AH), but it is not clear from what source. It is probable that his death occurred in the same years as the death of Muhammad ibn Ya'qub al-Kulayni (864-941), considering that Ayyashi was a contemporary of him.

== See also ==
- Mohammad ibn Umar Kashshi
- Zakaria ibn Idris Ash'ari Qomi
- Zakaria ibn Adam Ash'ari Qomi
- Ahmad ibn Ishaq Ash'ari Qomi
- Seyyed Mohammad Hojjat Kooh Kamari
