= Mohammad-Ali Behbahani =

Aqa Muhammad-Ali Behbahani
- آقا محمد علی بن محمد باقر بهبهانی

Personal life
- Born: 1144 AH (1731 CE) Karbala, Baghdad Vilayet, Ottoman Empire
- Died: 1216 AH (1801 CE) Kermanshah, Qajar Iran
- Resting place: Kermanshah
- Children: Aqa Muhammad-Ja'far, Aqa Ahmad, Aqa Mahmud, Aqa Muhammad-Isma'il, and Muhammad
- Parent: Muhammad-Baqer Behbahani
- Era: Qajar period
- Region: Iran
- Main interest(s): Islamic jurisprudence, usul al-fiqh, theology, interreligious polemics, and refutation of Sufism
- Notable work(s): Khayrātiyya, Maqāmiʿ al-Faḍl, Radd-i shubuhāt al-kuffār, and Qaṭʿ al-Maqāl fī Radd Ahl al-Ḍalāl
- Known for: Shia jurisprudence, opposition to Sufism, and religious polemics
- Other name: Aqa Muhammad-Ali Kermanshahi
- Occupation: Mujtahid, jurist and theologian

Religious life
- Religion: Islam
- Denomination: Shia
- School: Usuli
- Sect: Twelver
- Jurisprudence: Ja'fari

Muslim leader
- Teacher: Muhammad-Baqer Behbahani, Yusuf al-Bahrani
- Students: Sayyid Ali Tabataba'i, Sayyid Muhammad Mahdi Tabataba'i, Aqa Muhammad-Ja'far Behbahani, Aqa Ahmad Kermanshahi
- Influenced by: Muhammad-Baqer Behbahani, Aliqoli Jadid-ol-Eslam

Aqa Mohammad-Ali Behbahani (1731-1801 CE) was an Iranian Shia mojtahed, principally noted for his zealous hatred of Sufis.

== Biography ==
Behbahani was born on 20 June 1731 in the shrine city of Karbala in the Baghdad vilayet of the Ottoman Empire (now Iraq) as the eldest son of the well-known mojtahed Mohammad-Baqer Behbahani, a native of Isfahan. He was brought up in Behbahan in southwest Iran.
