= Fazlallah =

Fazlallah, also spelled Fadlallah, Fazlollah, Fazlullah etc. (Arabic: فضل الله)) is a male Muslim given name, composed of the elements Fadl and Allah, meaning bounty of God. In modern usage it may serve as a surname. It may refer to:

== Given name ==
- Fazlallah Astarabadi (Naimi) (1340–1394), Azerbaijani mystic, the leader of the Hurifis
- Fazlullah Mojadeddi (1957–2021), Afghan fighter and politician
- Fazlullah MPA (born 1980), Pakistani politician
- Sheikh Fazlollah Noori (1843–1909), Iranian Shiite cleric, executed for treason
- Fazlollah Javidnia, Iranian fighter pilot
- Fazlollah Reza (1915–2019), Iranian university professor of engineering
- Fazlullah Wahidi (born 1951), Afghan social worker and politician
- Fazlollah Zahedi (ca. 1897–1963), Iranian general and statesman

== Surname ==
- Hassan Fadlallah (born 1967), Lebanese politician
- Mahmoud Abdel Razek Fadlallah, known as Shikabala (born 1986), Egyptian footballer
- Mohammad Hussein Fadlallah (1935–2010), Lebanese Grand Ayatollah
- Maulana Fazlullah (1974–2018), leader of a banned Pakistani Islamic fundamentalist militant group
- Qazi Fazlullah Ubaidullah (fl. 1950), Pakistani politician
- Qazi Fazl Ullah, Pakistani Islamic scholar based in the United States
- Shamsi Fazlollahi (born 1941), Iranian actress
- Sylvie Fadlallah (born 1948), Lebanese diplomat
- Wardina Safiyyah Fadlullah Wilmot (born 1979), Malaysian actress, model and host
