= Essence of Life =

Essence of Life may refer to:

- Essence of Life (dance group), a dance based on Jiddu Krishnamurti teachings
- Essence of Life (The Outer Limits), an episode of The Outer Limits
- Essence of Life (book), a book of Hadith in Persian by Muhammad Baqir al-Majlisi
