= Salma Fayed =

Egyptian poet

- Born: Salma Fayed
- Citizenship: Egyptian
- Occupations: writer and poet
- Notable work: Memory of a Prophet Who Didn't Send Nightmares After Error The Stranger's Isolation The Birth of the Black Lace Orchid

Salma Fayed (born August 10, 1985) is an Egyptian poet born in Cairo. Fayed has many poem collections mainly; “The memory of a messenger that was never assigned” collection which received many local prizes in Egypt, as well as, Arabic prizes, in addition to, the collection “Nightmares beyond the Mistake”, the collection “Isolation of a Stranger”, Fayed has several novels published mainly; “The Birth of an Orchid” and “The Black Ribbon”.

== Career ==
Fayed published at some point her most acknowledged work, a collection of poems titled “The memory of a messenger that was never assigned”, by Dar Rawafed for Publishing and Distribution, as well as, the collection titled “Nightmares beyond the Mistake” that included a number of her poems. Fayed also published a third collection titled “the Isolation of a Stranger”, by Arab Scientific Publishers, Inc. in 176 pages that included poems about self – isolation, and homelands agony through poetic scenes surrounded by visions seeking the nature of human condition with its objectiveness and absurdness, in addition to, reflecting on the universe and existing problems expressing self- anxiety and seeking the faces of human truth hidden behind a false mask. In her collection of poems, Fayed attempted through a long exploring journey, to discover self and to find out the human being in relation to death, soul and life. The collection included 23 modern Arabic poems mainly; “A beginning”, “The Last Page”, “Which Way was the House”, “For this reason a suicide can take place”, “We Pray”, “Gun Powder”, “A train”, “Poison”, “Why the memory is hard”, (...) and other poems.

Later Fayed moved to the novel world, as she published her first novel titled “The Birth of an Orchid”, by Dar Almasry for Publication and Distribution, in addition to, a second novel titled “The Black Ribbon”, by Dar Noon for Publication and distribution. The last novel discusses a city of dense lights of different colours and narrow streets in which lives a girl who has no idea about what took place three months earlier in a marginal spot in the city, definitely in that dark street, that is merely a hall in one of the sleeping city's houses, the loud city of heavy traffic as defined by Fayed on the cover page.

== Opinions ==
Fayed believes that the effectiveness of cultural foundations’ performance obviously decline and directly participate in spoiling the public tastes and threatening the public culture; due to their acceptance of being subject to governmental corruption and inability to confront and fight for reform. Fayed criticized the fact that she cannot find a cultural platform with undisputed dignity, nor a popular magazine or newspaper that honors principals and great values to publish Arabic or Egyptian creations.

At a certain point Fayed drifted away from poem to writing novels, therefore; she wrote one novel in her pursuit to avoid repeating herself. Nevertheless; Fayed refuses to give up poem and to move to novels alone and she does not oppose doing both. The Egyptian poet believes that due to the massive openness to modern technology today, as well as, what she called the spatial invasion, the poem audience is becoming much smaller.

Like other poets, Fayed thinks that poems are built by both form and content and not by only one of them. Fayed does not confess the existence of restricted areas in poems as she says: “A poem does not know (forbidden) and does not confess the traditional or familiar. Every real crisis results in a good poet that must be celebrated and valued without checking the list of traditions or forbidden items.”

== Awards ==
In 2016, Fayed received the State Incentive Award in Arts for the poem collection “The memory of a messenger that was never assigned” to become the first and youngest female poet to receive this Award.

== List of her works ==
The following is a list of the works of the Egyptian poet Salam Fayed:

Poem collections

- The memory of a messenger that was never assigned,

- Nightmares beyond the Mistake, and

- Isolation of a Stranger

Novels

- The Birth of an Orchid

- The Black Ribbon

Titles of the main poem collections:

- Useless,

- While you count the fingers of your shadow,

- Where are bleeding from?

- A probability,

- I dream with my eyes open,

- The Western winds from the north,

- For the first time,

- A fever,

- Where is the life?

- As it should not be,

- Last Bloodline,

- A major fracture in the leg,

- They became mountains and rested,

- The water is red,

- They do not look back (a cave),

- The smell of a dream,

- Before the story,

- The bottom line is,

- Before the moment flees, and

- So that blood will not dry.
