= Mufaddal =

Mufaddal or Mofazzal is an Arabic name. People with this name include:

== Historical ==
- al-Mufaddal al-Dabbi (died c. 780–787), Arabic philologist of the Kufan school
- al-Mufaddal ibn Umar al-Ju'fi (died before 799), early Shi'i / ghulat leader and close confidant of Ja'far al-Sadiq (died 765)
- Athir al-Din al-Abhari, al‐Mufaddal ibn Umar ibn al‐Mufaddal al‐Samarqandi al‐Munajjim (died 1265 or 1262), Iranian astronomer and mathematician
- al-Mufaddal ibn Abi al-Fada'il, 14th-century Coptic Christian historian from Egypt

== Modern ==
- Mufazzal Haider Chaudhury (1926–1971), Bengali essayist and linguist
- Mufaddal Saifuddin (born 1946), spiritual leader and 53rd Da'i Mutlaq of the Dawoodi Bohras, a subgroup of the Ismaili Shia branch of Islam
- Mofazzal Hossain Chowdhury (born 1948), Bangladeshi government minister
- Kazi Shah Mofazzal Hossain Kaikobad (born 1956), Bangladeshi politician
- Kazi Mofazzal Hossain Shaikat (born 1986), Bangladeshi footballer
- Muhammad Mofazzal Hossain Master, Bangladeshi politician

== See also ==
- Mufaddaliyat, 8th-century anthology of ancient Arabic poems compiled by al-Mufaddal al-Dabbi
- Tawhid al-Mufaddal, 9th-century work falsely attributed to al-Mufaddal ibn Umar al-Ju'fi
