= Khattabiyya =

Iraqi Ghali sect

Khaṭṭābiyya was the name of a Ghali sect founded by Abu l-Khattab in Kufa. Abu l-Khattab claimed that Ja'far al-Sadiq, the 6th Imam of Shias, chose him as deputy and legatee (waṣī) and taught him the Greatest Name of God (Al-Ism al-A'zam). He was among the companions of al-Sadiq first, but then around 748 was rejected and cursed by him for his extremist ideas. The tension between Abu l-Khattab and al-Sadiq caused Abu l-Khattab's followers to split into several smaller sects.

Khattabiyyas were known for their beliefs about the divinity of the Islamic prophet Muhammad, his household, and certain other persons. According to Sa'ad Ash'ari and Kashshi, the first Khattabis considered al-Sadiq as God and considered Abu l-Khattab as a prophet who was sent by al-Sadiq. Ash'ari Writes that Khattabiyas, headed by Abu l-Khattab, believed that there should be two messengers at any time and the earth should not be empty of them: one is talker and the other is silent, according which in the beginning, Muhammad was talker and during his time Ali was silent. Abu Mansur al-Baghdadi also said that Khattabiyya had this belief about all twelve Imams, and that during al-Sadiq's time, they considered him the talker and Abu l-Khattab as silent, and they believed that after Imam Sadiq, Abu l-Khattab was the talker.
