= Fazlul Haq =

Fazlul Haq (Arabic: فضل الحق) is a male Muslim given name, meaning bounty of the Truth, referring to Al-Haqq, one of the Names of God in Islam. It's a common given name in Bangladesh. Both parts of the name are subject to varying transliteration, as the first part may be written Fazl or Fadl, followed by the Arabic definite article al, ul or el and the last part as Haqq, Haque, Hak, Huq etc.

Notable bearers of the name include:

- A. K. Fazlul Huq (1873–1962), the first elected Prime Minister of Bengal during British rule
- Fazlul Haque (judge) (1938–2023), former High Court judge of Bangladesh, advisor of the 2007 Bangladesh Caretaker government
- Sheikh Fazlul Haque Mani (1939–1975), Bangladeshi politician
- Fazlul Haque Amini (1943–2012), Muslim politician and Hanafi Islamic Scholar from Bangladesh
- Abul Kashem Fazlul Haq (professor) (born 1940), Bangladeshi writer, essayist, translator, critic and columnist
- A. K. M. Fazlul Haque (born 1949), Bangladesh Awami League Member of Parliament
- A. K. M. Fazlul Haque (surgeon) (born 1958), Bangladeshi surgeon
- AKM Fazlul Haque Milon, Bangladesh Nationalist Party Member of Parliament
- Md Fazlul Haque, flight sergeant of the Pakistan Air Force
