= Tafazzul =

Tafazzul is a South Asian Muslim masculine given name. It may also refer to:

- Tofazzal Hossain
- Tafazzul Islam
- Tafazzoli

== See also ==
- Fazl
