= Tafazzul Islam =

Tafazzul Islam (Bengali: তফজ্জুল ইসলাম) is a Bengali masculine given name of Arabic origin. It may refer to:

- Md. Tafazzul Islam (born 1943), 17th Chief Justice of Bangladesh
- Tofazzal Islam (born 1966), Bangladeshi biotechnologist, ecological chemist, educator and author

== See also ==
- Tafazzul
- Islam (name)
