= Tafazzoli =

- Language: Arabic

Origin
- Meaning: Charismatic

Tafazzoli or Tafazoli (Arabic: تفضلی) is a family name widespread in Iran which means "charismatic". Notable people with the surname include:

- Ahmad Tafazzoli (1937–1997), Iranian scholar and philologist
- Jahangir Tafazzoli (1914–1990), Iranian journalist and politician
- Mohammad Reza Tafazzoli (born 1974), Iranian composer
- Ryan Tafazolli (born 1991), English footballer of Iranian descent

== See also ==
- Tafazzul, the name it derives from
