= Tofazzal Hossain =

Tafazzul Husayn (Arabic: تَفَضُّل حُسَين) is a South Asian Muslim masculine given name of Arabic origin. It may refer to:

- Tafazzul Husain Khan Kashmiri (1727–1801), Shi'ite scholar, physicist and philosopher
- Tafazzul Hussain Khan (died 1868), British Indian army officer
- Tofazzal Hossain Manik Miah (1911–1969), Bengali journalist and politician
- Tafazzal Hossain Khan (1920–2022), Bangladeshi politician
- Tafazzul Hussain Siddiqui (1925–2002), Pakistani naval officer and journalist
- Tofazzal Hossain Comillai (1935–2015), Bangladeshi language activist, civil servant and writer
- Md Tofazzel Hossain Miah (born 1964), principal secretary to the Prime Minister of Bangladesh
- Tafazzal Hossain, Bengali politician
- Mirza Tofazzal Hossain Mukul (died 2016), Bangladeshi politician
- Tofazzal Hossain Sarkar (died 2021), Bangladeshi politician

== See also ==
- Tafazzul
- Hussein
