= Al-Fadl =

Al-Fadl (Arabic: الفضل), also spelled Al-Fazl and in other ways, is an Arabic term meaning the bounty. It is used as a male given name and, in modern usage, a surname. It may refer to:

== Given name ==
- Al-Fadl ibn Salih (740–789), Abbasid governor in Syria and Egypt
- Al-Fadl ibn Rawh ibn Hatim al-Muhallabi (died 794), provincial governor for the Abbasid Caliphate
- Al-Fadl ibn al-Rabi' (757/8–823/4), chamberlain and vizier of the Abbasid caliphs Harun al-Rashid and al-Amin
- Al-Fadl ibn Yahya (766–808), one of the Barmakids, governor in the Abbasid Caliphate under Harun al-Rashid
- Al-Fadl ibn Naubakht (8th century), Persian scholar at the court of the Caliph Harun al-Rashid
- Al-Fadl ibn Sahl (died 818), vizier of the Abbasid caliph al-Ma'mun
- Al-Fadl ibn Marwan (ca. 774–864), Christian vizier of the Abbasid caliph al-Mu'tasim
- Fadl ibn Rabi'ah (ca. 1107), Bedouin emir, progenitor of the Al Fadl dynasty
- Fadl ibn Isa (13th century), Al Fadl ruler under the Mamluks

== Surname ==
- Jamal al-Fadl (born 1963), Sudanese Islamic militant
- Amer Al Fadhel (born 1988), Kuwaiti footballer

== Other ==
- Al Fadl, an Arab dynasty that ruled parts of Syria on behalf of various Muslim states
- Al Fazl (newspaper), regular publication of the Ahmadiyya Muslim Community

== See also ==
- Abu'l-Fadl
