= Fazlul Karim =

Fazlul Karim (Bengali: ফজলুল করীম) is a Bengali masculine given name of Arabic origin, meaning bounty of the Generous One. Bearers of the name include:

- Sheikh Fazlul Karim Mona (1882–1936), poet and writer
- Fazlul Karim Shiqdar (1905–1986), lawyer, businessman, politician and soldier
- Mohammad Fazlul Karim (1927–2015), lawyer and politician
- Dr. Abu Ahmad Fazlul Karim Bhuiyan (1928–1987), physician and politician
- Sardar Fazlul Karim (1925–2014), academic, philosopher and essayist
- Syed Fazlul Karim (1935–2006), Islamic scholar and politician
- Fazlul Karim (born 1937), politician
- Mohammad Fazlul Karim (1943–2024), 18th Chief Justice of Bangladesh
- Sheikh Fazlul Karim Selim (born 1947), Minister of Health and Family Welfare

== See also ==
- A. B. M. Fazle Karim Chowdhury (born 1954), Bangladeshi politician
- Muhammad Fazal Karim (1954–2013), Pakistani politician
- Fazal Karim Miah (born 1951), West Bengali politician
