= Sylvie Fadlallah =

Lebanese diplomat (born 1948)

Lebanese Ambassador to France
- In office August 2002 – 2012

Personal details
- Born: Sylvie Dagher; 7 July 1948 (age 78) Siguiri, Guinea
- Spouse: Georges Fadlallah
- Children: 2
- Parents: Edouard Dagher (father); Hélène Sader (mother)
- Education: Saint Joseph University
- Awards: National Order of Merit (France)

Sylvie Fadlallah (née: Dagher; born 7 July 1948) is a Lebanese diplomat who served as the ambassador of Lebanon to France between 2002 and 2012.

== Early life and education ==
She was born in Siguiri, Guinea, on 7 July 1948. Her parents are Edouard Dagher and Hélène Sader. She is a graduate of Saint Joseph University where she obtained a degree in political science and law.

== Career ==
After her graduation she joined the Ministry of Foreign Affairs and held various posts there. She was appointed first counselor and then chargé d'affaires to the Lebanese Embassy in France in 1999 which she held until 2002. She was named as the Lebanese ambassador to France in August 2002. Her tenure ended in 2012. She also served as the permanent delegate of Lebanon at the UNESCO during her term as ambassador.

== Personal life and awards ==
Fadlallah is married to Georges Fadlallah and has two children. She is the recipient of the National Order of Merit (France; Officer).
