= Essence of Life (book) =

Book of Hadith in Persian by Muhammad Baqir al-Majlisi

Essence of Life, or Ayn al-Hayat, is a book of Hadith in Persian by Muhammad Baqir al-Majlisi (1616–1698 CE).

== Contents ==
Chapter Names:

1. Profiles of the Benevolent Companions of the Prophet (A.S.)
2. The Steps
3. The Fundamentals
4. The Benefits
5. Refulgence or Rays of Light
6. The Objectives
7. The Maxims or Regulations
8. The Traits - Qasail
9. Lamaat: The Rays Of Light
10. The Fruits
11. The Stars
12. The Yanabeeh or Streams
13. The Status
14. Masabeeh - The Lamps
15. Invocations

== See also ==
- List of Shi'a books
- Sayyid Murtadhā
- Sayyid Radhī
- Shaykh al-Mufīd
- Shaykh al-Tūsī
- Shaykh al-Sadūq
- Muhammad al-Kulaynī
- Allāmah Majlisī
- Shaykh al-Hur al-Āmilī
