= Aliqoli Jadid-ol-Eslam =

Portuguese Shi'ite apologist (d. c. 1722)

- Born: António de Jesus; Second half of the 17th century Portugal
- Died: c. 1722; Uncertain, but probably Isfahan
- Occupations: Author, dragoman (interpreter and translator). Originally: friar, missionary

António de Jesus (died c. 1722) was a Portuguese figure who flourished in late 17th and early 18th century Safavid Iran. Originally an Augustinian friar and missionary, he converted to Shia Islam during the early reign of Shah (King) Sultan Husayn (r. 1694–1722) and took the name Aliqoli Jadid-ol-Eslam. (Note: Also spelled Ali Quli Jadid(-)al-Islam.) He subsequently became an apologist of Shi'ism as well as a major polemicist against Christianity, Sufism, Judaism, Sunnism, philosophers and antinomians. In addition, after conversion, he served as an official interpreter (also known as a dragoman) at the royal court in Isfahan. Aliqoli Jadid-ol-Eslam was one of the late 17th century converts in Iran who "helped reaffirm the Majlesi brand of conservatism".

== Biography ==
Not many details are known about Aliqoli's life. He was born sometime during the second half of the 17th century in Portugal, and was originally an Augustinian friar and missionary named António de Jesus. He arrived in Isfahan, the Safavid royal capital, in 1691 at the latest. There he initially served in the retinue of Gaspar dos Reis, then head of the city's Augustinian monastery, before succeeding him in the post. He reportedly played an important role in the contacts between Portuguese diplomats and the Shah's government "at a time of an attempted Portuguese-Iranian alliance against the sultans of Oman in the Persian Gulf".

He converted to Shia Islam in Isfahan during the early reign of Shah (King) Sultan Husayn (r. 1694–1722) and took the name Aliqoli Jadid-ol-Eslam. There is no consensus on the date of his conversion. Reza Pourjavady and Sabine Schmidtke (2009) state that he converted in 1696, while according to Joao Teles e Cunha (2009), Abbas Amanat (2017) and Giorgio Rota (2017) he converted in 1697. According to Alberto Tiburcio (2018), "it certainly took place between 1694 and 1697". The precise reason for his conversion remains unknown. However, it is known that he corresponded with the long-time Capuchin resident of Isfahan, Raphael du Mans, about his intentions, and that he "felt disappointed by the way many missionaries bribed Muslims into conversion". Aliqoli Jadid-ol-Eslam's life bears similarities to that of his fellow former Augustinian missionary, Manuel de Santa Maria, who also lived in Iran and who took the name Hasan-Qoli Beg after embracing Islam.

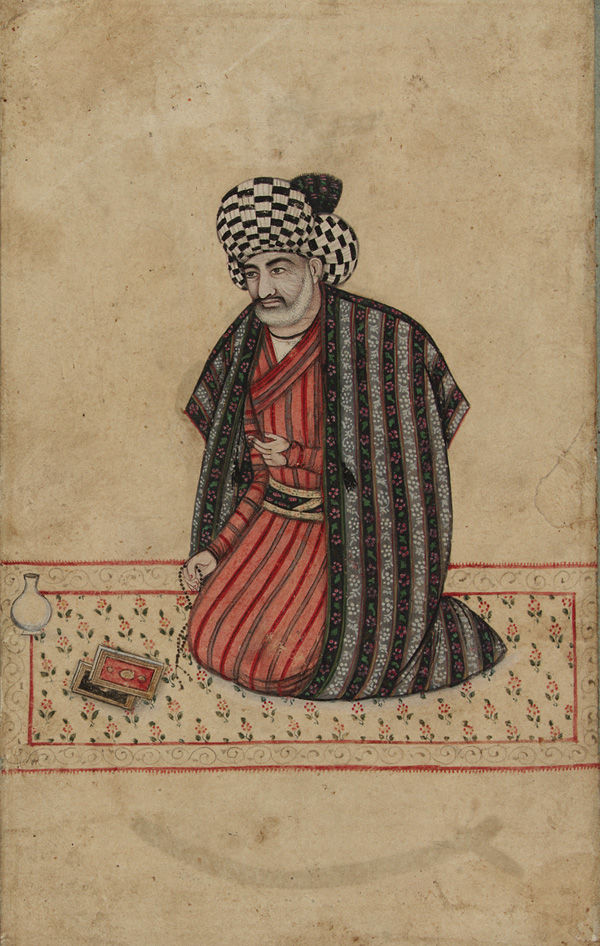
Portrait of Mohammad-Baqer Majlesi

After apostatising, Aliqoli became an apologist for Shia Islam as well as a major polemicist against Christianity, Sufism and Judaism. Abbas Amanat adds that in one of his major works, the Sayf ol-mo'menin fi qetal ol-moshrekin, Aliqoli not only made "a violent attack on Christians, Jews, and Sunnis but also on philosophers, Sufis, and antinomians". In addition, after conversion, he served as a dragoman, a translator and interpreter of European languages, at the Shah's court in Isfahan, succeeding du Mans to the post. Aliqoli was one of the late 17th century converts in Iran who "helped reaffirm the Majlesi brand of conservatism"; his appointment as royal dragoman further confirmed the Safavid state's "patronage of a prevailing xenophobic tendency". Tiburcio notes that according to one source, Aliqoli may have played a role in the persecution of the Catholic Armenian Shahremanian (Sceriman) family. He displayed detailed knowledge of Shi'ite intellectual history in at least one of his works, which also referenced Church historians. However, not all of his writings are extant, and of those works that survive, not all are fully preserved.

Aliqoli is known to have married. According to an August 1710 letter written by Louis-Marie Pidou de Saint-Olon, the Bishop of Babylon, his health had declined by that time, and he was reportedly suffering from pulmonary tuberculosis. Aliqoli died c. 1722, probably in Isfahan, though the precise location remains uncertain.

== Works ==
Aliqoli wrote several works (treatises) in the field of interreligious polemics. These include: (Note: According to Pourjavady and Schmidtke, Aliqoli's Esbat ol-nabovva ("The proof of prophethood") is apparently lost or may be identical with his Radd bar Yahud, a polemic against Judaism of which reportedly just one manuscript survives. Pourjavady and Schmidtke's stance is also mentioned by Tiburcio.)

- Hedayat ol-dallin (or ol-modallin) va-taqviyat ol-mo'menin ("Guidance for those who are led (or who lead) astray and strengthening for the believers"), consisting of four volumes. It was Aliqoli's first major work and was probably written around 1708 in either Portuguese or Latin. It was immediately translated into Persian. (Note: The four volumes are: (1) "The refutation of Christianity and the proofs of the principles of Islam" (Radd-e uṣūl-e dīn-e Naṣārā o esbat-e uṣūl-e dīn-e Eslām az rū-ye ketābhā-ye īshān); (2) "Refutation of the branches of Christianity and proofs of the branches of Islam" (Radd-e furūʿ-e dīn-e Naṣārā o esbat-e furūʿ-e dīn-e Islām az rū-ye ketābhā-ye īshān); (3) "Proof of the prophethood of Moḥammad and the Seal of the Prophets" (Esbat-e payāmbarī o khātamiyyat az ketābhā-ye īshān); and (4) "The proofs of the Imāmate and of the coming of the Mahdī" (Esbat-e emāmat o mahdaviyyat az ketābhā-ye īshān).) He dedicated the work to Shah Sultan Husayn. The Persian version exists in several manuscripts, but none of these is complete.
- Sayf ol-mo'menin fi qetal ol-moshrekin ("The sword of the faithful in the fight against the associators"). (Note: Also translated as "The sword of believers and slaying of the polytheists" or "The sword of the believers in battling the polytheists".) This was Aliqoli's second major work; written in Persian, it was completed on 2 June 1711.
- Fava'ed-e ezdevaj ("The benefits of marriage"). One of his minor works, it was probably completed before 1711 and was written in Persian.
- Resaleh dar radd-e jama'at-e sufiyan ("Treatise in refutation of the community of Sufis"). One of his minor works. Probably completed before 1711, it was written in Persian.

== Sources ==
- Amanat, Abbas (2017). Iran: A Modern History. Yale University Press. ISBN 978-0300231465.
- Flannery, John M. (2013). The Mission of the Portuguese Augustinians to Persia and Beyond (1602-1747). Brill. ISBN 978-9004247703.
- Lockhart, Laurence (1986). "European Contacts with Persia, 1350-1736". In Jackson, Peter; Lockhart, Laurence (eds.). The Cambridge History of Iran, Vol. 6: The Timurid and Safavid Periods. Cambridge University Press. ISBN 978-0521200943.
- Pourjavady, Reza; Schmidtke, Sabine (2009). "ʿAlī Qulī Jadīd al-Islām". In Fleet, Kate; Krämer, Gudrun; Matringe, Denis; Nawas, John; Rowson, Everett (eds.). Encyclopaedia of Islam (3rd ed.). Brill Online. ISSN 1873-9830.
- Rota, Giorgio (2017). "Conversion to Islam (and sometimes a return to Christianity) in Safavid Persia in the sixteenth and seventeenth centuries". In Norton, Claire (ed.). Conversion and Islam in the Early Modern Mediterranean: The Lure of the Other. Routledge. ISBN 978-1317159797.
- Teles e Cunha, Joao (2009). "PORTUGAL i. RELATIONS WITH PERSIA IN THE EARLY MODERN AGE (1500-1750)". In Yarshater, Ehsan (ed.). Encyclopædia Iranica (Online ed.). Encyclopædia Iranica Foundation.
- Tiburcio, Alberto (2018). "Persia: ʿAlī Qulī Jadīd al-Islām". In Thomas, David; Chesworth, John A. (eds.). Christian-Muslim Relations. A Bibliographical History. Volume 12 Asia, Africa and the Americas (1700–1800). Brill. ISBN 978-9004384163.
