= Job of Edessa =

Job of Edessa (c. 760? – c. 835?), called the Spotted (Arabic: al-Abrash), was a Christian natural philosopher and physician active in Baghdad and Khurāsān under the Abbasid Caliphate. He played an important role in transmitting Greek science to the Islamic world through his translations into Syriac.

== Life ==
Job was a native of Edessa. His birth is usually placed around 760, but may have been somewhat later, since he was active as a physician in the early 830s. The 13th-century historian Bar Hebraeus says that he was a contemporary of the Patriarch Timothy I of Seleucia-Ctesiphon (727–823) and a member of the Church of the East, that is, he "followed the doctrine of Nestorius". Alphonse Mingana argued, on the basis of his Edessene origins, that he was probably a convert from either the Melkite or the Syriac Orthodox church. All known manuscripts of his works were produced in Syriac Orthodox circles.

In copies of his Book of Treasures, Job is given the title resh asawātā ('chief physician'). According to the 13th-century writer Yāqūt al-Hamawī, Job and his son Ibrāhīm both served the Abbasid caliph al-Maʾmūn (813–833) as physicians in Baghdad. In the early 830s, Job was assigned by the caliph to be the personal physician of ʿAbd Allāh ibn Ṭāhir, governor of Khurāsān.

Job's death took place after 832.

== Works ==
Job of Edessa was primarily known as a translator of Greek works into Syriac. The Christian polymath Ḥunayn ibn Isḥāq, in a letter to ʿAlī ibn Yaḥyā ibn al-Munajjim, claimed that Job translated 36 works by Galen, mainly into Syriac. Although Ḥunayn did not always think highly of Job as a translator, he made use of several of his Syriac versions in making his own Arabic translations. Job is mentioned by Ibn al-Nadīm in his encyclopedia Fihrist as a translator of Greek. He is said to have worked with a certain Simʿān to translate the astronomical tables (zīj) of Ptolemy for Muḥammad ibn Khālid ibn Barmak. He probably also translated Aristotle.

Two original works by Job have survived:

- The Book of Treasures (Syriac: Ktābā d-simātā), an encyclopedic work of natural philosophy divided into six sections analysing the world according to a theory of elements. Job covers anatomy, astronomy, chemistry, mathematics, medicine, metallurgy, metaphysics, meteorology, physics, physiology, psychology and zoology. The astronomy shows no Ptolemaic influence, suggesting that it was composed before Job translated Ptolemy.
- On Canine Hydrophobia (or On Rabies)

In these he cites several of his earlier works by title, namely:

- On Urine (probably several treatises)
- On the Causes of Fevers
- On the Soul
- On the Causes of the Coming Into Existence of the Universe From the Elements
- On the Five Senses
- On Essences
- On Faith
- Ten Syllogisms Taken From the Nature of Things, Which Prove that Christ is Both God and Man

These are now lost, but his treatises on urine were cited in medieval Arabic scientific works. Muḥammad ibn Aḥmad al-Khwārazmī cites it under the title Kitāb al-tafsīra fī l-bawl and Abū l-Ḥasan Aḥmad al-Tabarī cites both that work and another entitled Kitāb al-bayān limā yūjibuhu taghayyur al-bawl. Muṭahhar ibn Ṭāhir al-Maqdisī cites Job's Kitāb al-tafsīr ('book of interpretation'), which is probably either the Kitāb al-tafsīra fī l-bawl or else the Book of Treasures under a different title. These citations imply that the work on urine was either originally written in Arabic or else translated into Arabic. Other Arabic authors to cite Job include Abū Bakr al-Rāzī and al-Bīrūnī. Scholars disagree whether he wrote some works in Arabic or if they circulated only in translation.

== Editions ==
- Job of Edessa (1935). Mingana, Alphonse (ed.). Encyclopaedia of Philosophical and Natural Sciences as Taught in Baghdad about A.D. 817, or Book of Treasures. W. Hefer & Sons. doi:10.7282/T3K935PN.

== Bibliography ==
- Brock, Sebastian (1997). A Brief Outline of Syriac Literature. St. Ephrem's Ecumenical Research Institute.
- Roggema, Barbara (2008). "Job of Edessa". In David Thomas; Barbara Roggema (eds.). Christian–Muslim Relations: A Bibliographical History. Vol. 1 (600–900). Brill. pp. 502–509. doi:10.1163/1877-8054_cmri_COM_23616.
- Roggema, Barbara (2011). "Iyob of Edessa". In Sebastian P. Brock; Aaron M. Butts; George A. Kiraz; Lucas Van Rompay (eds.). Gorgias Encyclopedic Dictionary of the Syriac Heritage: Electronic Edition. Gorgias Press. Published online by Beth Mardutho, 2018.
