= Ali ibn Ibrahim al-Qummi =

Iranian Islamic scholar and jurist (9th-10th century)

Alī ibn Ibrāhīm al-Qummi
- عليّ بن إبراهيم القمّي
- Title: Al-Shaykh al-Aqdam

Personal life
- Born: 9th century
- Died: 919
- Era: Islamic golden age
- Region: Iran and Iraq
- Main interest(s): Ḥadīth, Tafsir
- Notable work: Tafsir al-Qummi

Religious life
- Religion: Islam
- Denomination: Twelver Shia
- Jurisprudence: Ja'fari

Muslim leader
- Teacher: Ahmad ibn Ishaq Ash'ari Qomi, Ibrahim b. Hashim al-Qummi, Aḥmad al-Barqī
- Influenced by: Ali al-Hadi, Hasan al-Askari
- Influenced: Muhammad ibn Ya'qub al-Kulayni

Abū al-Ḥasan ʿAlī ibn Ibrāhīm al-Qummi (Persian: علی بن ابراهیم قمی; Arabic: علي بن إبراهيم القمي), also known by his patronymic "Abu al-Hasan" or nickname "al-Shaykh al-Aqdam", was a 9th century Shia Muslim commentator and jurist who lived during the times of tenth and eleventh Shia Imams, Ali al-Hadi (c. 835–868) and Hasan al-Askari (c. 868–874) respectively . He was a student of Ahmad ibn Ishaq Ash'ari Qomi, a companion of the ninth, tenth and eleventh Shia Imams. He's one of the teachers of Muhammad ibn Ya'qub al-Kulayni (864–941), the author of famous Shia hadith collection Kitab al-Kafi, and many traditions in al-Kafi were transmitted by him and his father. He spread the "Kufan" traditions (Hadiths) in Qom and collected Hadith from his teachers. He wrote more than 15 books, famously his commentary Tafsir al-Qummi which utilizes hadith from the Shia Imams to explain the meanings of Quranic verses.

His other works include Akhbār Al-Qurʾan, Nawadir al-Qurʾan, al-Nasikh wa al-Mansukh (Abrogator and Abrogated books), al-Sharā'i' (Laws or Revealed religions), and al-Tawhid wa al-Shirk (Monotheism and Polytheism).

== Birth, Demise and Family ==
His birthday is unknown; but it is certain that he lived during the second half of the third/ninth and beginning of fourth/tenth centuries. He died in 919.

His father, Ibrahim b. Hashim, was one of the famous Shia hadith transmitters and a companion of ninth Shia Imam Muhammad al-Jawad (811–835), who moved from Kufa to Qom. It is said that he was the first person who disseminated the hadiths of the Kufans in Qom. He is reported to have met Imam Ali al-Rida (765–818).

'Ali b. Ibrahim's brother, Ishaq, and sons Ahmed, Ibrahim and Muhammad, were all religious scholars of their time.

== Works ==
Ali b. Ibrahim wrote many books. Al-Tafsir, commonly known as al-Tafsir al-Qummi, is his most famous book. He compiled it based on traditions of imams without any explanation. He narrated most of the hadiths from his father, Ibrahim b. Hashim. This book is one of the earliest and most important available Shi'a exegetical sources.

- Al-Nasikh wal-mansukh (Arabic: الناسخ والمنسوخ) (The Abrogator and Abrogated)
- Qurb al-isnad (Arabic: قرب الإسناد)
- Al-Shara'i' (Arabic: الشرائع) (Laws)
- Al-Hayd
- Al-Tawhid wa l-shirk (Arabic: التوحيد والشرك) (Monotheism and Polytheism)
- Fada'il Amir al-Mu'minin (Arabic: فضائل أمير المؤمنين) (Virtues of Amir al-Mu'mineen)
- Al-Maghazi
- Al-Anbiya' (Arabic: الأنبياء) (The Prophets)
- Al-Mashdhar
- Al-Manaqib
- Ikhtiyar al-Qur'an
