= Abu al-Khattab =

Abū l-Khaṭṭāb Muḥammad ibn Abī Zaynab Miqlāṣ al-Asadī (Arabic: اَبُوالخَطّاب مُحَمَّد بن أبی زَینَب المِقلاص الأَسَدی), nicknamed al-Barrād al-Ajda (Arabic: البَرّاد الأَجدَع), was the founder of the Ghulat sect of the Khattabiyya. Cursed by Ja'far al-Sadiq for his extreme beliefs, he is also considered among the revolutionaries of the beginning of the Abbasid era (c. 138/755).

== Name ==
In various sources, Abu al-Khattab is also referred to as Abu Ismail and Abu al-Taibat (or Abu al-Dhabiyat and Abu al-Dhabian). In some sources, the word Zarrad is used. However, it seems that Barrad nickname is more famous.

== Beliefs ==
According to Sa'ad al-Ash'ari, whose account is confirmed by other sources including various narrations by Kashshi, Abu al-Khattab initially claimed that the Shi'i Imam Ja'far al-Sadiq made him his guardian and taught him al-Ism al-A'zam (the great divine name). Some time later, he claimed to be a "prophet" and after that he claimed to be a "messenger". Then he said that he is one of the angels and the messenger of God to the people of the earth. The report of Sa'ad al-Ash'ari tells that the earlier Khattabiyya considered al-Sadiq as a God and Abu al-Khattab as a messenger sent by al-Sadiq who ordered to obey him.

== In Imamiyya belief ==
Shia sources mention him well after the disagreement between him and Ja'far al-Sadiq due to the distortion of Imami teachings.

It has been stated in various narrations that Abu al-Khattab called his followers to worship Ja'far al-Sadiq and considered himself one of his prophets. In other narrations attributed to various Imams, it is stated that Abu al-Khattab attributed false words to al-Sadiq and distorted his statements. According to these narrations, al-Sadiq made his companions aware of Abu al-Khattab's misguidance by cursing him. Also, in various narrations, Abu al-Khattab has been interpreted as a transgressor, an infidel, a polytheist and an enemy of God. In a narration given by Ibn Babawayh in his work al-Khasal, citing al-Sadiq's interpretation of verses 221 and 222 of the Quran chapter Surah Al-Shaara, Abu al-Khattab is considered one of those Satan descends upon them.

There are reports about Abu al-Khattab's relationship with al-Sadiq, before he became a Ghali: in a narration quoted by al-Kulayni from Ali ibn Uqbah, Abu al-Khattab used to present the questions of the Companions of al-Sadiq to him and send the answers to the Companions. Ghazi Noman has also stated that he was close to al-Sadiq before his defection. In Imamiyyah hadith books, there are hadiths narrated by Abu al-Khattab from al-Sadiq, and in some of them it is stated that these hadiths are related to the time when Abu al-Khattab had not deviated. The time of Abu al-Khattab's deviation is estimated around 135 Hijri (753 AD).

== Relation with Shia sects ==
It seems that Abu al-Khattabb formed the Ismaili teaching about transference of spiritual authority and the Nusayris' belief in the manifestation of divinity in man (Arabic: ḥulūl). he stated that Imam Ja’far has delegated his authority by appointing him as his waṣī (deputy or executor of his will) and entrusting him with the 'Greatest Name' of God (al-Ism al-A'zam), which was supposed "to empower its possessor with extraordinary strength in conceiving hidden matters". In Fatimid era Ismaili works, he is condemned as a heretic who taught radical ideas unacceptable to the Fatimids. The latter, like the Twelvers, rejected his teachings as his personal interpretations attributed to al-Sadiq.

The Nusayriyya highly respected Abu al-Khattab and always compared his character to that of Salman al-Farisi. They consider al-Sadiq's curse to be an act of Taqiyya and have narrated many hadiths by quoting al-Sadiq and other Imams about Abu al-Khattab's virtues. Also, in some ancient sources, it has been mentioned that Abu al-Khattab and the Khattabiya were connected with the Ismailis, although there is no mention of such connections in the official Ismaili sources.

== Death ==
Abu al-Khattab along with his followers in Kufa—during the governorship of Isa ibn Musa (132-147 AH) on behalf of the Abbasid caliph al-Mansur—rebelled against the caliphate system, while calling al-Sadiq divine. This caused their killing to be legalized by the government.

Not much is known about how the followers of Abu al-Khattab functioned in this uprising. Some people have said that Abu al-Khattab and his companions in Kufa, while wearing Ihram clothing, chanted the name of Ja'far al-Sadiq and testified to his divinity, which caused their murder to be accepted by the government. Others have also mentioned that Abu al-Khattab set up a tent in the Kanasa area of Kufa and called upon his followers to worship al-Sadiq there.
