= Muhammad Ardabili =

Muhammad Ardabili (Persian: محمد ابن علی اردبیلی) was an eminent Shia transmitter of Muslim tradition in seventeenth century.

== Life ==
His complete name was Muhammad Son of Ali Ardabili. there is little information about his life and personality. He was originally from Ardabil but most of his life, it seems, passed in Baghdad and Najaf in Iraq.

== Scientific career ==
He had eminent masters such as Jafar Ibn Abdiah Ibn Ibrahim Kamarehei who was dominant in religious fields and disciplines. The others are like Ali Ibn Ahmad Ibn Kamal Addin Hosein Astarabadi. He travelled also to Isfahan but its history is not clear. His importance is because of writing the book of Jami Al Rowat (compilations of narrators) in the subject of transmitters of traditions (Ilm-e- Rijal).

== The book of Jami Al Rowat ==
Compilations of narrators is one of the first and important shia books in Ilm-e-rijal. He tries to describe the characters of transmitters of traditions in their classes and evaluate them in accordance to authentic and inauthentic of transmitters. In fact this book could considers as a gloss on the Astarabadi's Talkhis and other books like Montajeb Addin's Al fehrest. This book for a while counted as the original resource among shia jurists. This book has been written during 25 years and Shah Soleiman given command to produce another transcription of it.

== See also ==
- Biographical evaluation
