= Tafsir al-Qummi =

Islamic commentary by Ali ibn Ibrahim al-Qummi (c. 9th-10th century)

- Author: Ali ibn Ibrahim al-Qummi
- Original title: تفسير القمي
- Language: Arabic
- Subject: Quranic exegesis
- Genre: Religious
- Media type: Print

The Tafsir al-Qummi (Arabic: تفسیر القمي), also known as Tafsir Qomi (Persian: تفسیر قمی), is a Shia Muslim commentary on the Quran by Ali ibn Ibrahim al-Qummi (died 919), a Shia jurist and hadith transmitter who was a companion of Ali al-Hadi (828–868) and Hasan al-Askari (844–874).

The commentary is generally based on the method of quoting hadiths from the Imams to explain the meanings of Quranic verses. Most of these hadiths were transmitted by al-Qummi's father, Ibrahim ibn Hashim al-Qummi, who was a companion of Muhammad al-Jawad (811–835).

== Structure ==
The Tafsir al-Qummi comprises at least two different tafsirs that have been combined: one by Ali ibn Ibrahim al-Qummi himself, and the other by Abu al-Jarud Ziyad ibn al-Mundhir, a companion of the fifth Imam Muhammad al-Baqir (c. 676 – c. 732) who later became the eponymous founder of the Jarudiyya (an early Zaydi sect). Abu al-Jarud's tafsir had been appended to the first by the latter's first transmitter, Abu al-Fadl al-Abbas ibn Muhammad.
