= On the Universe =

Work traditionally ascribed to Aristotle

On the Universe (Ancient Greek: Περὶ Κόσμου, romanized: Perì Kósmou; Latin: De Mundo) is a theological and scientific treatise included in the Corpus Aristotelicum but usually regarded as spurious. It was likely published between the 3rd century BCE and the 2nd century CE. The work discusses cosmological, geological, and meteorological subjects, alongside a consideration of the role an independent god plays in maintaining the universe.

== Contents ==
According to Johan C. Thom, De Mundo "attempts to provide an explanation of the role of god in preserving and maintaining the cosmos while at the same time upholding the notion of his transcendence and independence." While the work is mostly in the Peripatetic style established by Aristotle, elements of Platonic, Stoic, and Neopythagorean philosophy permeates it (which Thom argues is indicative of its post-Aristotelian authorship). Alongside its theological considerations, it also discusses cosmological, geological, and meteorological subjects.

== Authorship and date ==
Doubts about the authorship of De Mundo were already expressed in antiquity: when Proclus mentioned the work in one of his commentaries he added "if the book De Mundo is by him." In the Middle Ages, it was widely believed that De Mundo was a genuine product of Aristotle. The notable exception was the 12th-century philosopher Maimonides who rejected it outright. Doubts were expressed again in the 15th and 16th centuries, and it became common to reject the work in the 17th century. General agreement to deny Aristotle's authorship was reached in the 19th century, with only a few voices dissenting since then.

The main reasons to reject the work are:

1. Differences in language and style, including the use of words unrecorded until the 3rd-century BCE
2. Many minor points of philosophical doctrine which differ from Aristotle (such as the idea that air is moist and cold in book 2)
3. A theological position which diverges in certain respects from that of Aristotle – in particular an emphasis on a transcendent god, who, although outside of the universe, is nevertheless present and active everywhere in it.

Attempts have sometimes been made to identify the author of the work. In the 19th century, when the Stoic philosopher Posidonius was thought to be in the background of many treatises on natural philosophy, it was common to regard the book as based on his writings, and the work itself was sometimes ascribed to him. As late as 1905 Wilhelm Capelle (Neue Jahrbücher, 1905), traced most of the doctrines to Posidonius. Another name occasionally proposed as author but now rejected was Nicolaus of Damascus. Today the general position is simply to assume it was written by an anonymous eclectic philosopher, and as such the author is referred to now as Pseudo-Aristotle. The writer "knew a great deal about philosophy, yet cherished Aristotelian philosophy above all others", but there are "no grounds even to speculate" who the author was.

As for the date of the treatise, the earliest possible dates (terminus post quem) are set by:

- The account of the British Isles which draws on the discoveries by Pytheas, who probably published them shortly after Aristotle's death.
- The idea that the Hyrcanian (Caspian) Sea is connected to the ocean which probably descends from a misleading report by Patrocles (early 3rd-century BCE).

It is commonly thought that the work was written in the 1st centuries BCE/CE, but the range of possible dates extend from the 3rd century BCE to the 2nd century CE.

== Textual history ==
After its original publication in Greek, the work was translated to Latin by Apuleius, into Syriac by Sergius of Reshaina and three distinct Arabic versions.

== See also ==
- Hypostasis (philosophy and religion)
- Meteorology

== Sources ==
- Kraye, Jill (2014). "Disputes over the authorship of De Mundo". In Thom, Johan C. (ed.). Cosmic Order and Divine Power: Pseudo-Aristotle, On the Cosmos. Mohr Siebeck. ISBN 978-3161528095.
- Pajón Leyra, Irene; Bartoš, Hynek (2020). "Geography (Chapter 3, 393a9–394a6)". In Gregorić, Pavel; Karamanlis, George (eds.). Pseudo-Aristotle: De Mundo (On the Cosmos). A commentary. Cambridge University Press. ISBN 978-1108834780.
- Gregorić, Pavel; Karamanlis, George (2020). "Introduction". Pseudo-Aristotle: De Mundo (On the Cosmos). A commentary. Cambridge University Press. ISBN 978-1108834780.
- Furley, D. J (1955). Pseudo Aristotle: De Mundo (in Ancient Greek). Cambridge, MA: Harvard Univserity Press.
