= Mohammad-Baqer Majlesi =

Iranian Twelver Shi'a cleric (c.1627 – 1699)

Allamah Shaykh al-Islam Mohammad-Baqer Majlesi
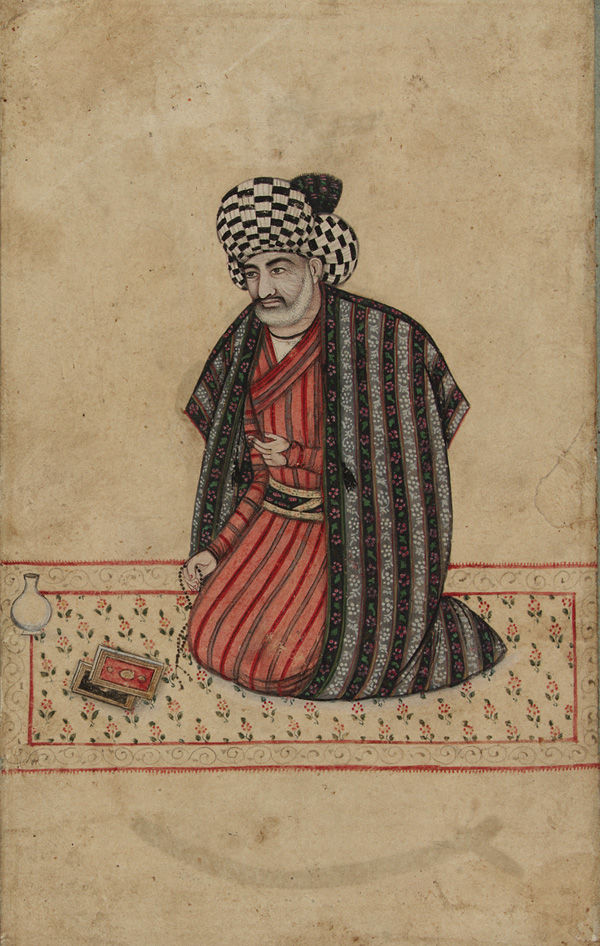
- Portrait of Mohammad-Baqer Maljesi

Personal life
- Born: 1037 AH | 1627 Majlesi, Isfahan, Safavid Iran
- Died: 27 Ramadan 1110 AH | 29 March 1699 (aged 71–72) Isfahan, Safavid Iran
- Main interest(s): Hadith, Fiqh
- Notable work(s): Bihar al-Anwar; Haqq al-Yaqeen
- Education: Isfahan Seminary

Religious life
- Religion: Islam
- Denomination: Shia
- School: Akhbari (moderate)
- Sect: Twelver
- Jurisprudence: Ja'fari
- Profession: Clergy, jurist

Muslim leader
- Post: Shaykh al-Islām of Isfahan
- Period in office: 1687 - 1699
- Predecessor: Agha Hossein Khansari
- Successor: Muhammad Saleh Khatunabadi
- Influenced by: Muhammad Taqi Majlesi, Muhammad ibn Ya'qub al-Kulayni, Ibn Babawayh, Shaykh al-Tusi
- Influenced: Ni'mat Allah al-Jazairi, Mirza Abdullah Afandi, Muhammad Saleh Khatunabadi, Muhammad ibn Ali Ardabili, Sulayman ibn Abdullah al-Bahrani, Muhammad-Husayn Khatunabadi, Aliqoli Jadid-ol-Eslam

Mohammad Baqer Majlesi (Note: Also romanized as Majlessi, Majlisi, or Madjlessi.) (c. 1627/1628 – 29 March 1699; AH 1038–1111; Persian: محمد باقر مجلسی), also known as Allamah Majlesi, Majlesi al-Thani ("Majlesi the Second"), and Muḥammad Bāqir ibn Muḥammad al-Taqī al-Majlisī, was a leading Iranian Twelver Shi'a theologian and ʿālim of the Safavid dynasty, whose teachings and activities became a formative influence on the subsequent development, practice, and organization of Twelver Shi'ism. He has been described as "one of the most powerful and influential Shi'a Ulama of all time" , whose policies and actions helped redirect Twelver Shi'ism along the course it subsequently followed.

Majlesi strongly opposed the rationalization of religion through philosophy, as well as Sufism and Sunnism, whose adherents he regarded as determined rivals. He succeeded in persuading the Shah to exclude Sunnis from Isfahan. He wrote in both Persian and Arabic, thereby reaching a substantially wider audience with his vigorous advocacy of Twelver Shi'ism. His principal work was Biḥār al-anwār ("The Ocean of Lights"), a multivolume compilation of hadith. He also promoted devotion to the Imams and the elaboration of religious rituals, including devotion to the martyrs (shahīd) and pilgrimage practices.

Majlesi's influence extended beyond theology into the religious organization and devotional culture of Iranian Twelver Shi'ism. His pronounced opposition to Sunnism may have contributed to the circumstances surrounding the Afghan invasion of 1722. The subsequent political developments eventually facilitated the rise of the Qajar dynasty, established in 1794 (AH 1209), which endorsed Majlesi's religious programme and made Tehran the capital. The Qajars were later overthrown by Reza Khan, but the succeeding Pahlavi dynasty did not displace either the established Shi'a devotional order or the religious authority exercised through the mullahs in the name of the Hidden Imam, an authority that Majlesi had helped establish.

Among Majlesi's other works was Hayat al-Qulūb. He was buried beside his father in the family mausoleum adjoining the Jameh Mosque of Isfahan.

== Early life and education ==
Born in Isfahan in 1627, his father, Mulla Mohammad Taqi Majlesi (Majlesi-ye Awwal—Majlesi the First, 1594-1660), was a cleric of the Ja'fari school.

The genealogy of his family can be traced back to Abu Noaym Ahmad ibn Abdallah Esfahani (d. 1038), the author, of a History of Isfahan, entitled Zikr-i akhbar-i Isfahan. His first definitive ancestor however, appears to be Kamal al-Din Darvish Mohammad ibn Hasan Ameli, who was of Lebanese origin and the first scholar to propagate the Usul of Shia Hadith in Isfahan, following the establishment and rise of the Safavids. Ameli later adopted two nisbas, that is, Natanzi ("from Natanz") and Esfahani ("from Isfahan").

Majlesi himself also used these nisbas and even signed some of his ijazat as "al-Esfahani al-Natanzi al-Ameli". Majlesi's father Mohammad Taqi was also the first of the line to bear the epithet "Majlesi".

By the age of 25, Baqer Majlesi gained certification of riwāyat from Mulla Sadra to teach. He is said to have completed studies under 21 masters. He is reported to have trained 181 students to become masters themselves.

== Influence and beliefs ==
In 1687, the Safavid emperor, Suleiman, appointed Majlesi as the Shaykh al-Islām (Chief Religious Leader) in Isfahan, the capital of the Safavid Empire. In this influential position, he was given a free hand by the Sultan to encourage and to punish as he saw fit. "The three inter-related areas in which Majlisi exerted his efforts were" the suppression of Sufism, philosophic views known as falsafah, which he claimed were contrary to Islam, and "the suppression of Sunnism and other religious groups."

According to scholar Moojan Momen, Majlisi's era marked a breaking point, as he successfully undercut the influence of Sufism and philosophic rationalism in Shiism. "Up to the time of Majlisi, Shiism and Sufism were closely linked, and indeed Sufism had been a vehicle for pro-Shia sentiment among the Sunnis. Even the most eminent members of the Shi'i ulama in the preceding centuries had come under the influence of Sufism."

After the death of Majlesi, "this process continued among the succeeding generations of ulama" so that Sufism became "divorced from Shiism and ceased to influence the mainstream of Shi'i development. Philosophy was also down-graded and ceased to be an important part of studies at the religious colleges."

=== Legalism ===
He also re-established clerical authority under his leadership, "and renewed the impetus for conversion from Sunni to Shi'a school." Majlesi is "credited with propagating numerous Shi'a rituals that Iranians regularly practice," such as Azadari, Arba'in pilgrimage, Alam processions, Ta'ziyah and Latmiya.

Majlesi also "fervently upheld the concepts of 'enjoining the good' and 'prohibiting evil'," and in so doing endeavoured to provide fatwas (judgements) for "all of the hypothetical situations a true believer could or might face." In one "exposition of virtues of proper behavior", he gave directions on everything from how to "wear clothes to sexual intercourse and association with females, clipping fingernails, sleeping, waking, urination and defecation, enemas, sneezing, entering and leaving a domicile, and treatments and cures for many illnesses and diseases."

More controversially, Majlesi defined "science" very narrowly as "knowledge of the clear, secure ayat; of the religious duties and obligations which God has fixed in His Justice; and of the Prophetic Traditions (Hadith), which are valid until the day of Resurrection." Beyond this, he warned, the seeking of knowledge is "a waste of one's life," and worse would "generally lead to apostasy and heresy, in which case the likelihood of salvation is remote." He opposed the school of mystical Irfani philosophy developed by Mir Damad and Mulla Sadra, who argued that the Quran was always open to reinterpretation, and valued insights that came from intuition and ecstasy rather than reason.

== Work and contribution ==
Allamah Al-Majlisi's most important field of interest was the hadith. He popularized his teaching by writing numerous works in an easily understandable style, in which he summarized the essential doctrines for the common people. Allamah Majlisi was also a very prolific writer. He wrote more than 100 books, both in Arabic and Persian. Some of his more famous works are:

- Bihar al-Anwar ("Seas of Light") in 110 volumes.
- Reality of Certainty
- Mirror of Intellects, a 26-volume commentary.
- Shelter of the Upright People, a 16-volume commentary.
- Provisions for the Hereafter
- A Gift for the Pilgrims
- Essence of Life
- Adornment of the Pious
- Al-Fara'edh al-Tarifah
- Majmu'at Rasa'il I'tiqadi

== See also ==
- Safavid conversion of Iran to Shia Islam
- Du'a al-Kumayl
- Sharif al-Murtaza
- Al-Sharif al-Radi
- Al-Shaykh Al-Mufid
- Shaykh Tusi
- ibn Babawayh
- Muhammad ibn Ya'qub al-Kulayni
- Amina Bint al-Majlisi
- Al-Hurr al-Aamili
- Aliqoli Jadid-ol-Eslam
