= Musa al-Kazim =

Seventh of the Twelve Shia Imams (745–799)

Imam Musa al-Kazim مُوسَىٰ ٱلْكَاظِم Seventh Imam of Twelver Shi'ism
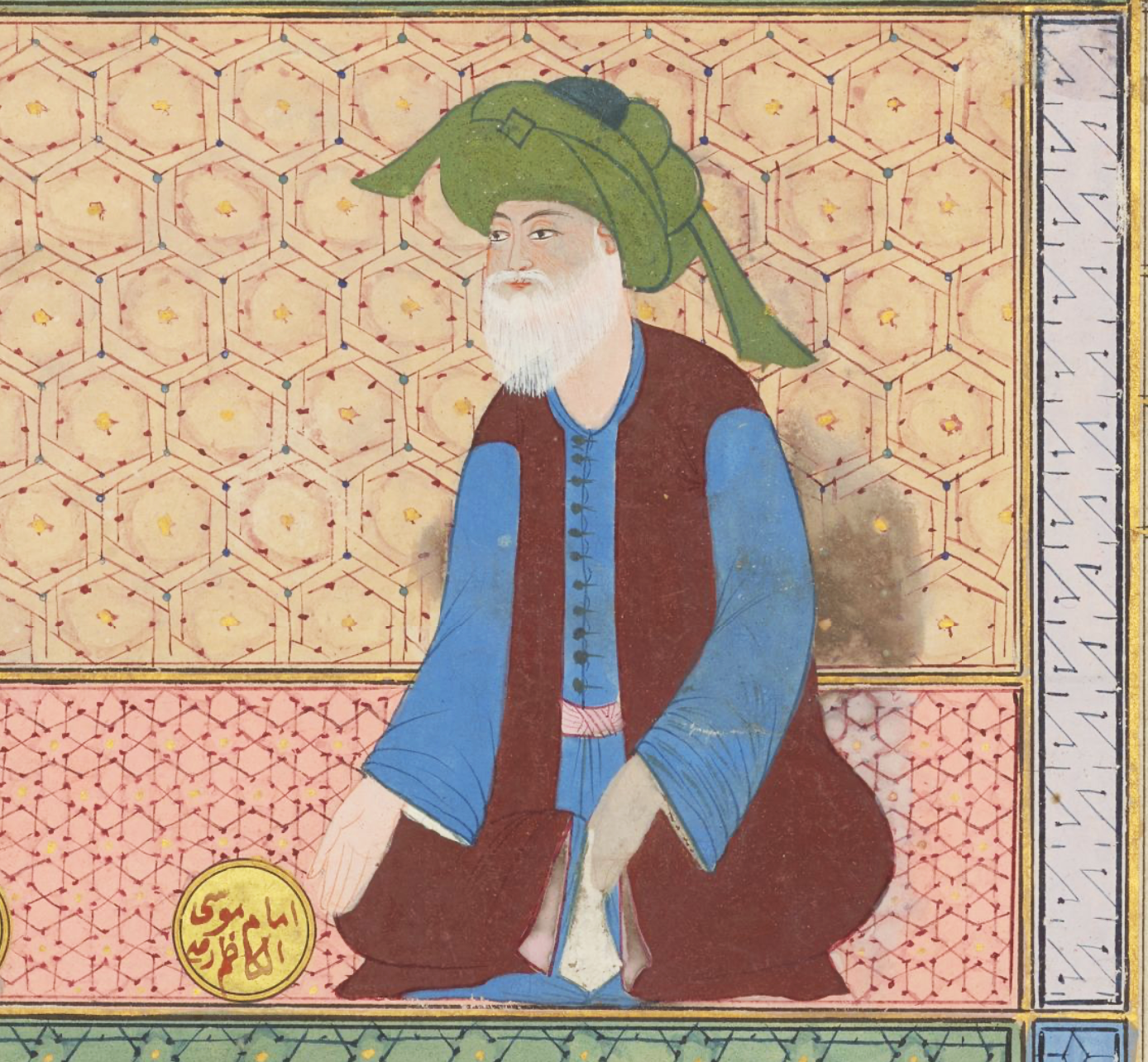
- 16th‑century Ottoman iconographic depiction of Musa al-Kazim

7th Shia Imam
- In office 765–799
- Preceded by: Ja'far al-Sadiq
- Succeeded by: Ali al-Rida
- Title: al-Kazim (lit. 'the forbearing') al-Abd al-Salih (lit. "the holy servant")

Personal life
- Born: c. 8 November 745 (7 Safar 128 AH) Medina, Umayyad Caliphate
- Died: c. 31 August 799 (aged 53) (25 Rajab 183 AH) Baghdad, Abbasid Caliphate
- Resting place: Shrine of the Two Imams, Baghdad, Iraq; 33°22′48″N 44°20′16.64″E
- Spouse: Najma
- Children: List of children: Ali al-Rida; Ahmad; Abbas; Fatima; Husayn; Ibrahim; Isma'il; Zayd
- Parents: Ja'far al-Sadiq (father); Hamida Khatun (mother)
- Other name: Bab al-Hawa'ij

Religious life
- Religion: Shia Islam

Musa al-Kazim (Arabic: مُوسَىٰ ٱبْن جَعْفَر ٱلْكَاظِم, romanized: Mūsā ibn Jaʿfar al-Kāẓim; 745–799) was a descendant of the Islamic prophet Muhammad and the seventh imam in Twelver Shia Islam. Musa is often known by the title al-Kazim (lit. 'forbearing'), apparently a reference to his patience and gentle disposition. He was born in 745 in Medina to Ja'far al-Sadiq, the sixth Shia imam, who died in 765 without publicly designating a successor to save his heir from the wrath of the Abbasid caliphs. The subsequent crisis of succession was eventually resolved in favor of al-Kazim, with a dissenting group, now known as the Isma'ilis, separating from the mainstream Shia.

After the death of al-Sadiq, Musa al-Kazim remained in Medina, where he kept aloof from politics and devoted himself to religious teachings. He was nevertheless tightly restricted by the Abbasid caliphs and spent much of his adult life in their prisons. To counter these restrictions, he established an underground network of local representatives to organize the affairs of his followers across the Abbasid Empire and to collect their religious donations. His final imprisonment, c. 795, ended with his death in 799 in a Baghdad prison, possibly poisoned at the instigation of the Abbasid caliph Harun al-Rashid. The shrine of al-Kazim and his grandson, Muhammad al-Jawad, is a popular pilgrimage destination for Twelver Muslims in Kazimayn, Baghdad.

Musa al-Kazim played a key role in eradicating extreme views and exaggerations (ghuluww) from Twelver thought. His answers to legal questions have survived in Wasiyya fi al-aql, and he is credited with numerous supplications. Musa al-Kazim is also revered for his piety in Sunni Islam and considered a reliable transmitter of prophetic sayings. He is a link in the initiatic Golden Chain in Sufism, and some Sufi saints are often associated with him. Various nonprophetic miracles are attributed to al-Kazim, often emphasizing his precognition. He was succeeded in imamate by his son, Ali al-Rida.

== Life ==
=== Birth and early life ===
Musa was probably born on 8 November 745 (7 Safar 128 AH). He was born either in Medina, or in nearby al-Abwa', located between Medina and Mecca. Alternative birth dates are September 745 and 746–747. His father was Ja'far al-Sadiq, a descendant of Ali ibn Abi Talib and Fatima, who were the cousin and daughter of the Islamic prophet Muhammad, respectively. Ja'far al-Sadiq was widely accepted as the legitimate imam by the early Shia community, who rejected the ruling Umayyad caliphs as usurpers. Musa's mother was Hamida Khatun, a Berber slave-girl. She was also known as al-Musaffat (lit. 'the purified'), a title which was perhaps a reference to her religious learning, as she is said to have taught Islamic jurisprudence to women in a seminary in Medina. Abdallah al-Aftah and Isma'il ibn Ja'far were the elder half-brothers of Musa, and Muhammad ibn Ja'far al-Sadiq was his younger full brother. Musa was about four years old when the Abbasid revolution overthrew the Umayyad Caliphate in 750. He continued to live in Medina under the authority of his father al-Sadiq, until the latter died in 765. Ja'far al-Sadiq was poisoned at the instigation of the Abbasid caliph al-Mansur (r. 754–775), according to the Shia.

=== After the death of al-Sadiq ===
After the death of al-Sadiq, Musa al-Kazim remained in Medina, where he stayed out of politics, similar to most of his predecessors. As with his father, al-Kazim instead taught religious sciences in Medina. Over time, he also established an underground network of representatives (wukala) to collect religious donations from his followers and organise their affairs.

The Abbasids, who claimed descent from Muhammad's uncle Abbas ibn Abd al-Muttalib, had rallied the support of the Shia community against the Umayyads in the name of the family of Muhammad. But many Shias were disillusioned when the Abbasid al-Saffah (r. 750–754) declared himself caliph, as they had instead hoped for an Alid leader, one who had descended from Muhammad, that is, a descendant of his daughter Fatima and Ali ibn Abi Talib. The Abbasids soon turned against their former allies, and were generally hostile to the Shia imams, especially after the abortive 762–763 revolt of the Alid pretender Muhammad al-Nafs al-Zakiyya. Musa al-Kazim was contemporary with the Abbasid caliphs al-Mansur, al-Hadi, al-Mahdi, and Harun al-Rashid. Unlike his father, who often taught freely in Medina, al-Kazim was highly restricted by the caliphs, and spent much of his adult life in the Abbasid prisons in Iraq. By one Shia account, under the Abbasids' watchful eyes, al-Kazim even discouraged his followers from greeting him in public.

==== Reign of al-Mansur (r. 754–775) ====
Shia sources blame the Abbasid caliph al-Mansur for the death of Ja'far al-Sadiq, who did not publicly designate an heir, likely fearing the Abbasid reaction. Shia sources report that the caliph ordered his governor of Medina to kill the heir to al-Sadiq, a plan that was thwarted when the governor found out that al-Sadiq had appointed four or five legatees. The resulting crisis of succession to al-Sadiq was ultimately resolved in favor of al-Kazim, who spent the first ten years of his imamate under al-Mansur. This succession crisis nevertheless weakened the mainstream Shia, which is perhaps why al-Mansur left al-Kazim relatively unmolested, while still keeping him under surveillance. This initial mild treatment of al-Kazim would not continue under future caliphs.

==== Reign of al-Mahdi (r. 775–785) ====
During the ten years of the reign of al-Mahdi, al-Kazim remained under surveillance in Medina. He was arrested at least once by the caliph, who around 780 briefly imprisoned him in the Abbasid capital of Baghdad. There Musa was placed in the custody of the prefect of police, al-Musayyab ibn Zuhayr al-Dabbi, who later became a follower of al-Kazim. According to the Sunni historian al-Tabari (d. 923), al-Mahdi had a dream in which Ali ibn Abi Talib berated him for imprisoning his progeny, which apparently compelled the caliph to set al-Kazim free, after he pledged not to revolt against the caliph.

==== Reign of Musa al-Hadi (r. 785–786) ====
Musa al-Kazim did not lend his support to the 786 revolt of the Alid pretender al-Husayn ibn Ali al-Abid, and a letter attributed to al-Kazim even warns al-Husayn about his violent death. The Shia imam was nevertheless accused of complicity by the Abbasid caliph al-Hadi, who was dissuaded from killing al-Kazim only by the intervention of the judge Abu Yusuf. The caliph died soon after, and thus al-Kazim survived. He then composed the supplication Jawshan Sagheer (lit. 'coat of mail') in gratitude, according to the Shia jurist Sayyed Ibn Tawus (d. 1266).

==== Reign of Harun al-Rashid (r. 786–809) ====
The persecution of the Shia reached a climax during the caliphate of Harun, who is said to have killed hundreds of Alids. Harun also arrested al-Kazim, brought him to Baghdad, and was apparently intent on killing him but then set him free as a result of a dream, it is said. Harun was perhaps provoked by an earlier incident, according to the Sunni historian Ibn Khallikan (d. 1282): When the two men visited the tomb of Muhammad in Medina, Harun, intent on showing his family ties to the prophet, had said, "Salutation unto thee, O prophet of God, unto thee who art my cousin!" Musa al-Kazim apparently countered with, "Salutation unto thee, O my dear father!" This angered Harun, who retorted, "O Abu al-Hasan [al-Kazim], such glory as thine is truly to be vaunted of!"

The final imprisonment of al-Kazim may have been plotted by Yahya ibn Khalid, Harun's vizier. The vizier was reportedly threatened by the growing influence of Ja'far ibn Muhammad, who was entrusted with the caliph's son and heir, Al-Amin. Yahya is said to have tipped the caliph about the secret Shia disposition of Ja'far and also suborned a relative of al-Kazim to testify that the imam secretly collected religious dues from the Shia. Alternatively, al-Kazim was imprisoned perhaps because the caliph felt threatened by the views of a disciple of al-Kazim, the theologian Hisham ibn al-Hakam, who argued for the right of al-Kazim to the caliphate, thus implying the illegitimacy of the Abbasids. In any case, Harun had al-Kazim arrested in 793, or in 795, and had him brought to Basra in Iraq, where he was imprisoned for a year under the custody of its governor, Isa ibn Ja'far ibn al-Mansur. Harun then ordered al-Kazim to be killed but Isa did not carry out the order, apparently being impressed by the piety of al-Kazim. Isa instead arranged for al-Kazim's house arrest in Baghdad under Fadl ibn al-Rabi' and then under Al-Fadl ibn Yahya. During his house arrest, however, al-Kazim likely continued to direct the Shia affairs. When Harun learned about this relatively comfortable conditions of al-Kazim, he gave Fadl a written order to kill the Shia imam. By one account, Fadl refused the order and was given a hundred lashes. Musa al-Kazim was then handed to al-Sindi ibn Shahik, the prefect of police in Baghdad, who is said to have poisoned the imam.

== Death (799) ==
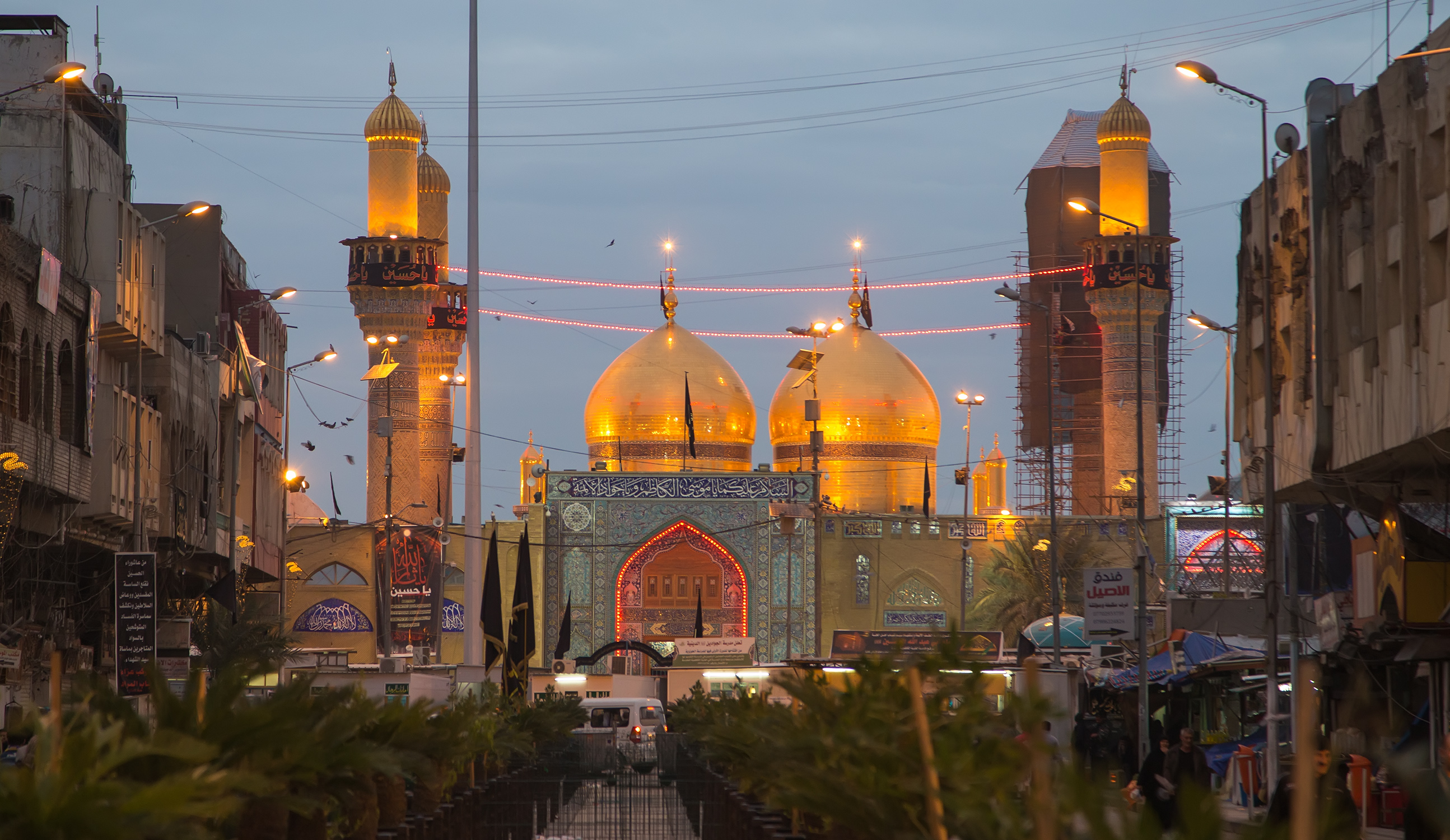
Shrine of al-Kazim in Kazimiyan, Baghdad

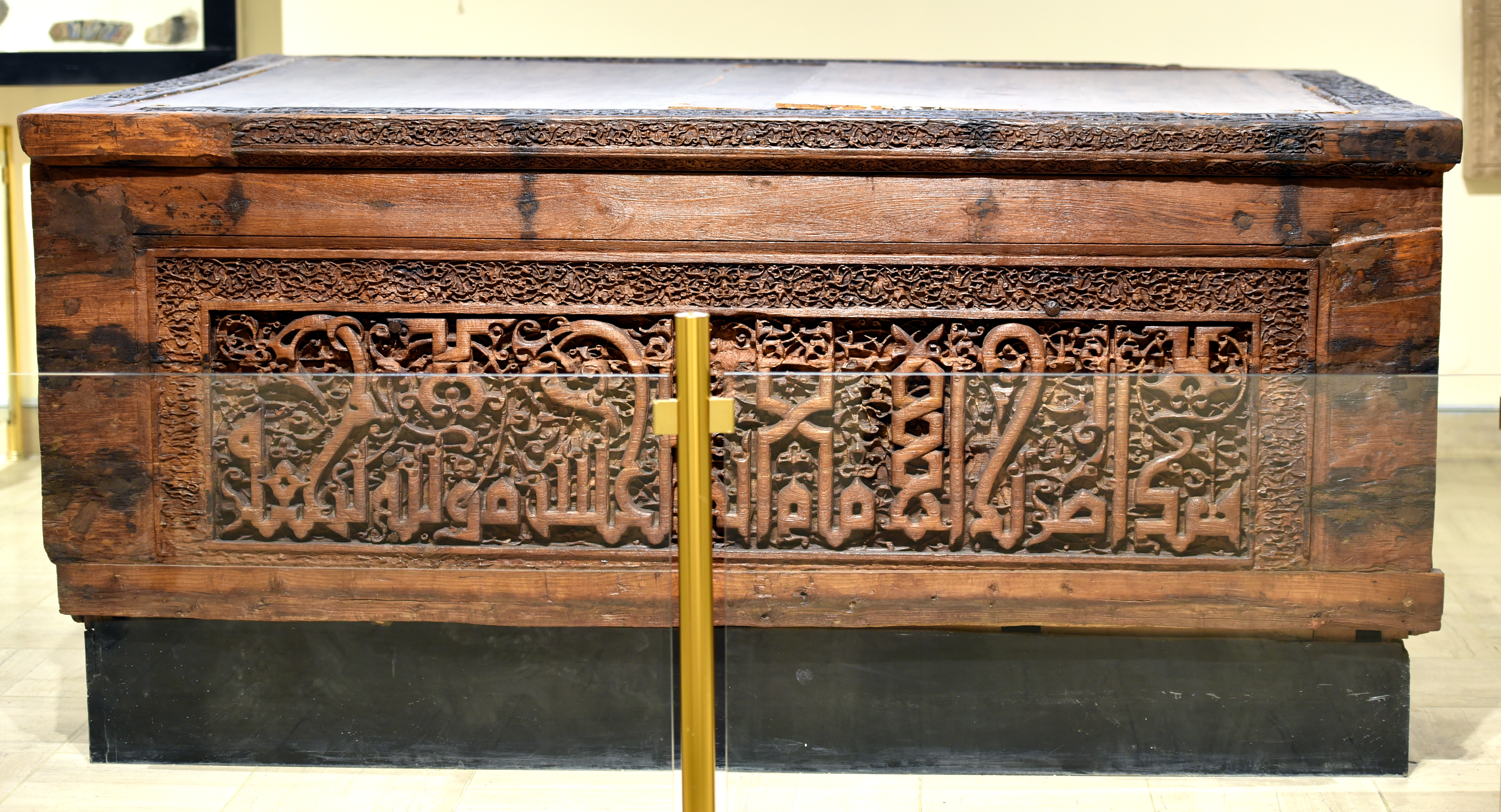
The wooden tomb of Musa al-Kazim, dated to the eleventh century, kept in Iraqi National Museum

Musa al-Kazim died in 799 in the al-Sindi ibn Shahak prison of Baghdad, after being transferred from one prison to another for several years. He was poisoned by order of the Abbasid caliph Harun, an order conveyed to al-Sindi through Yahya al-Barmaki, when he had visited the caliph in Raqqa to intercede for his son, Fadl. The latter had reportedly disobeyed caliph's earlier orders to kill al-Kazim. That al-Kazim was murdered is the Twelver view, as represented by Al-Shaykh al-Mufid (d. 1022), a prominent Twelver theologian. By contrast, al-Tabari does not mention the cause of al-Kazim's death, thus implying that al-Kazim died from natural causes, a view preferred by most Sunni authors. The date of al-Kazim's death is often given as 13, 31 August, or 1 September 799 (6, 24, or 25 Rajab 183 AH), while Twelvers annually commemorate this occasion on 25 Rajab.

=== Shrine ===
Harun brought several public figures to examine al-Kazim's body and testify that he had died naturally. The caliph also publicly displayed the body of al-Kazim in Baghdad, perhaps to dispel the rumors that he had not died and would return as the Mahdi, the Messianic figure in Islam. Later al-Kazim was buried in the Quraysh cemetery in northwest Baghdad, which is now located in Kazimayn (lit. 'the two Kazims'), a city named after him and his grandson, Muhammad al-Jawad, who is buried next to him. At first a dangerous site for Shia visitors, the burial site in time became an important center for Shia pilgrimage. A shrine has stood over the two graves since the time of the Buyid dynasty (r. 934–1062), but the present complex dates to the Safavid Iran Shah Ismail I (r. 1501–1524), the Twelver ruler of Iran. The shrine of al-Kazim has over time acquired a reputation as a place where prayers are fulfilled, that is, a gate to the fulfilment of needs (bab al-hawaij), as attested by the Sunni scholar al-Shafi'i (d. 820). Also buried there are a number of medieval Shia scholars, including the polymath Nasir al-Din al-Tusi (d. 1274).

== Imamate ==
=== Designation ===
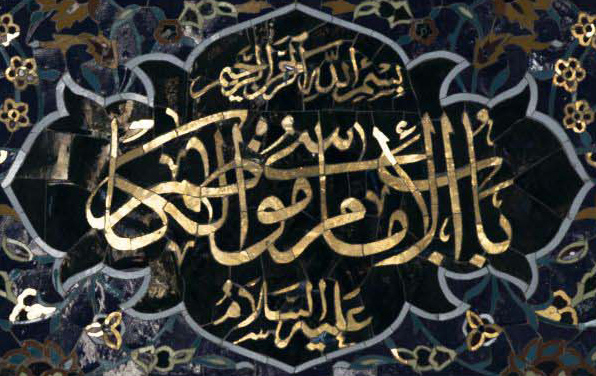
Calligraphic inscription of al-Kazim's name

After the death of al-Sadiq in 765, his following became fractured, for he did not publicly designate a successor to save his heir from the Abbasids' wrath. The majority of his followers, the antecedents of the Twelvers, ultimately accepted the imamate of his son al-Kazim, who also received the backing of some renowned students of al-Sadiq, including Hisham ibn al-Hakam and Mu'min al-Taq. However, instead of al-Kazim, many expected the next imam to be his elder half-brother, Isma'il ibn Ja'far, who predeceased his father. These were the antecedents of the Isma'ilis, some of whom waited for Isma'il to return as the Mahdi and the others instead accepted the imamate of his son Muhammad ibn Isma'il. When the latter died, some expected him to return as the Mahdi and others followed a line of imams who claimed descent from him. Even though the Isma'ilis were active against the Abbasids, they were of marginal importance until their political success much later: The Fatimid Caliphate was established in Egypt at the turn of the tenth century and the Qarmatians rose to power in Bahrain in the late ninth century. Their relations with the mainstream Shia were apparently tense at the time, as some have implicated them in the arrest of al-Kazim and the murder of some of his followers.

Isma'ilis believe that Isma'il was the designated successor, and this appears to be the general consensus of the early Shia sources as well. For the Isma'ilis, the death of Isma'il in the lifetime of al-Sadiq did not annul his divine designation (nass), as that would have contradicted their belief in the omniscience of God. By contrast, the early Twelvers explained any such changes in the divine will be through bada', a notion similar to abrogation (naskh) in the Quran. Later Twelvers, such as al-Mufid, altogether rejected the claim that Isma'il was the designated successor of al-Sadiq. Historical evidence indeed suggests ties between Isma'il and radical Shias, of whom the quiescent al-Sadiq did not approve. Twelvers instead cite the qualifications of al-Kazim to support his fitness for the imamate after al-Sadiq. While the Twelvers and the Isma'ilis are the two sects that have survived, there were also additional branches that emerged after the death of al-Sadiq: After the death of al-Sadiq, some waited for his return as the Mahdi, but perhaps the majority of his followers initially accepted the imamate of his eldest surviving son, Abd-Allah al-Aftah. This group became known as the Fathites. Abd-Allah apparently lacked the scholarly prerequisites for the imamate and died a few months later without a male heir. His followers then mostly turned to al-Kazim, although for some time they still counted al-Aftah as their seventh imam. Some other followers of al-Sadiq turned to Musa's younger brother, al-Dibaj, who staged an unsuccessful revolt against the Abbasids in 815–816. Over all, it appears that many of those who had split off after the death of al-Sadiq eventually joined al-Kazim later.

=== Representatives ===
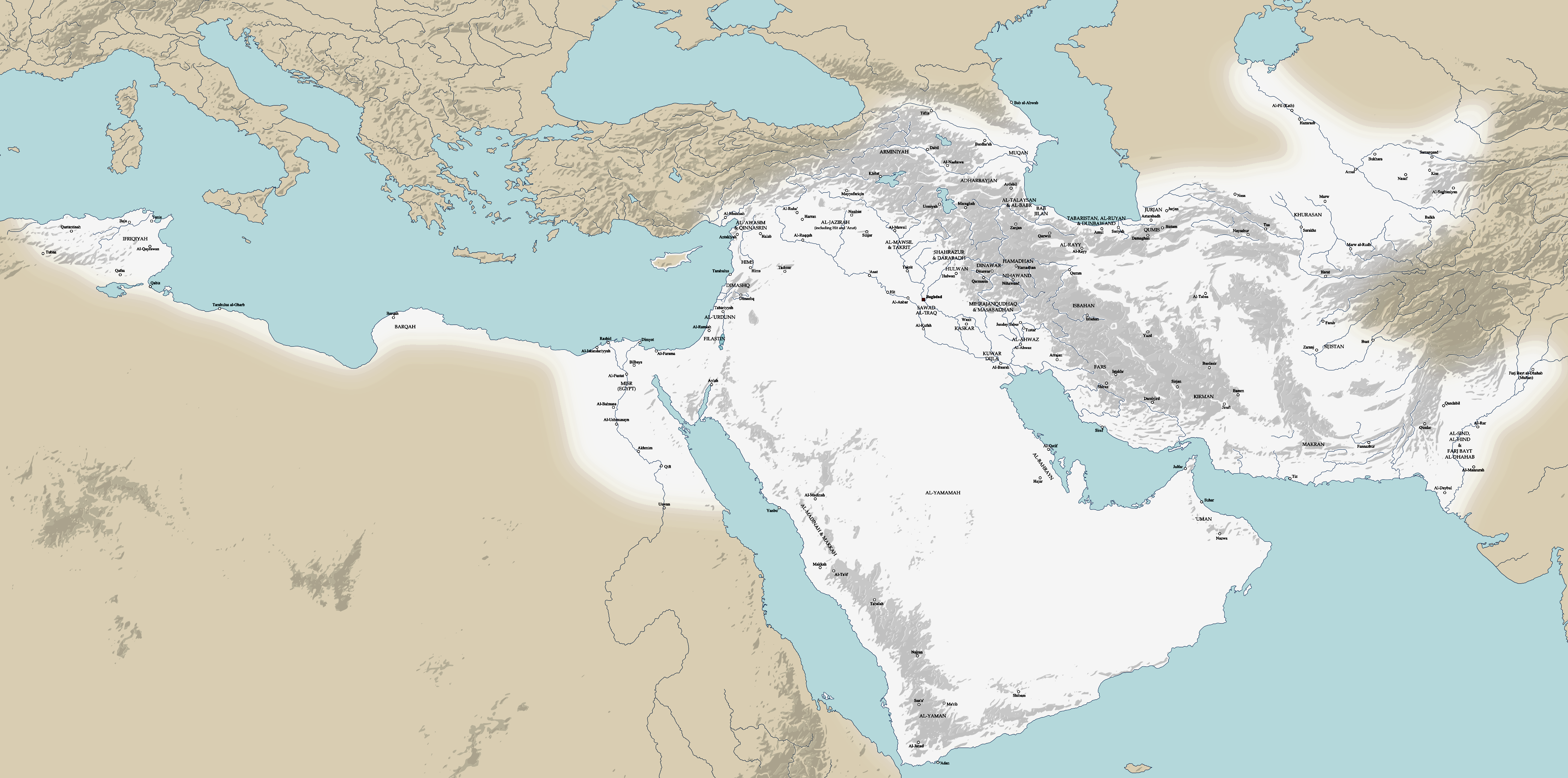
Abbasid territories circa 788

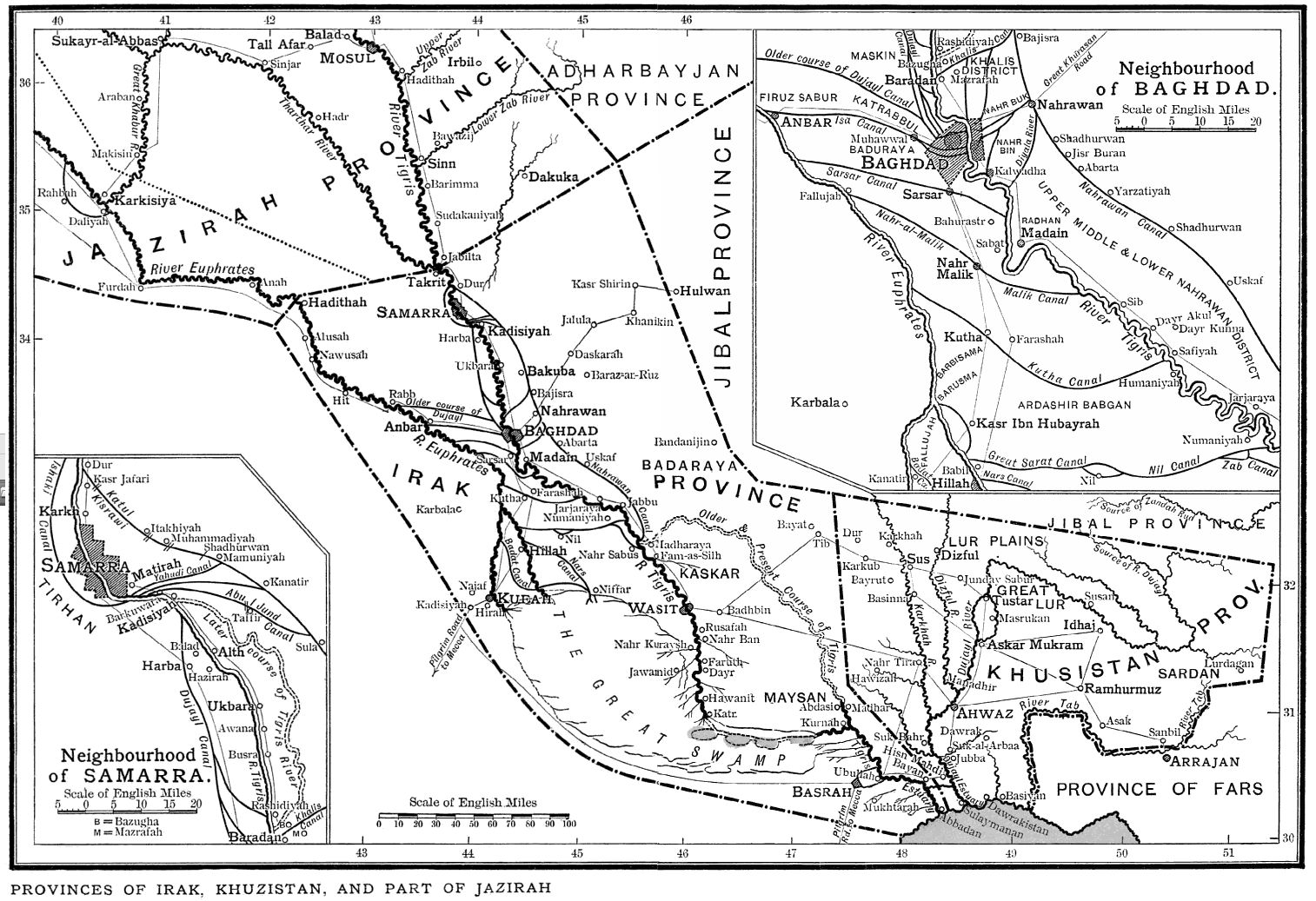
Map of Iraq and the neighboring Khuzestan, with inserts on the vicinities of Baghdad and Samarra, during the Abbasid period

The Abbasid caliphs tightly controlled the activities of al-Kazim, who consequently appointed a network of local representatives (wukala, sing. wakil) to organize the affairs of the Shia and collect their religious dues, particularly Khums (lit. 'one-fifth'). Extending throughout the Abbasid empire, this underground network was likely established by al-Kazim, while there is also some evidence that an earlier network might have existed under his predecessor, al-Sadiq. During the imamate of al-Kazim, new Shia centers were also established in the Maghreb and Egypt.

It appears that al-Kazim permitted cooperation with the Abbasids so long as it furthered the Shia cause. In particular, he might have allowed his companion Ali ibn Yaqteen to hold the vizierate to promote justice and social welfare, or perhaps to save other Shias in times of danger. In line with the principle of taqiya, al-Kazim even instructed Ibn Yaqtin not to practice the Shia ablution (wudu') to avoid the suspicion of the Abbasid ruler. In another Shia report, al-Kazim saves Ibn Yaqtin by instructing him to withhold some goods destined for him, thus foiling a plot aimed at exposing their personal ties. Ibn Yaqtin was nevertheless finally arrested, as part of the same campaign of arrests that led to the imprisonment and death of al-Kazim. He later died in prison. Historically, whether Ibn Yaqtin attained the vizierate office and for long enough to make any difference is uncertain. Some other Abbasid officials whose loyalty rested with al-Kazim were Abbas ibn Ja'far al-Ash'ath, governor of Khorasan, and Waddah (or Wadih), who was an official of the postal service (Barid) in Egypt.

=== Succession ===
After the death of al-Kazim in 799, most Shias acknowledged his son, Ali al-Rida, as their imam. These Shias were the antecedents of the Twelvers, known at the time as the Qat'iyya because they confirmed the death of al-Kazim. By contrast, some followers of al-Kazim waited for his return as the Mahdi, citing a hadith ascribed to al-Sadiq to the effect that the seventh imam would be the Mahdi; these became known as the Waqifite Shia (lit. 'those who stop'). Many of the Waqifiyya later returned to the mainstream of Shia, declaring al-Rida and his descendants as the lieutenants of al-Kazim. The Waqifite Shia sect and its beliefs eventually disappeared, beginning in the ninth century. The Waqifite Shia included the Bushariyya, named after Muhammad ibn Bashir, the Kufa exaggerator (ghulat) who regarded al-Kazim as divine and claimed to be his interim successor. Ibn Bashir was later charged with heresy and executed by order of the caliph.

The formation of the Waqifite Shia may have had a financial dimension, as some representatives of al-Kazim probably declared him the last imam just to avoid returning what was entrusted to them during the lifetime of al-Kazim. These rogue representatives included Mansur ibn Yunus al-Qurayshi, Ali ibn Abi Ḥamza al-Bata'ini, Ziyad ibn Marwan al-Qandi, Uthman ibn Isa al-Amiri al-Ruasi (Ruwasi), and Hayyan al-Sarragh, although al-Ruasi may have later turned possessions over to al-Rida. More broadly, the term Waqifite Shia is also applied to any Shia group who denied or hesitated over the death of a particular imam, thus refusing to recognise his successors. The imamate of Ali al-Rida was not challenged by any of his brothers, even though some of them revolted against the Abbasids, including Ahmad ibn Musa.

=== Karamat ===
Often viewed as evidence of his divine favor, various nonprophetic miracles (karamat, sing. karama) have been attributed to al-Kazim in Shia sources. Therein, he is considered knowledgeable of all languages, and this ability in Shia sources is not specific to al-Kazim. Indeed, a hadith attributed to al-Kazim counts this ability as a sign of the true imam. This also included the ability to communicate with animals, following the precedent of An-Naml, a chapter in the Quran, in which Solomon speaks with birds and ants. Musa al-Kazim is thus said to have prayed for a wild beast to ease the birthing pains of its partner. By other accounts, Musa spoke in his cradle, revived a dead tree with his touch, and brought back to life the dead farm animal of a poor family. By another account, al-Kazim showed to a disciple the spirit of al-Sadiq, who had died some years earlier, seated in the entryway to his house.

=== Ghulat ===
Musa al-Kazim and his father al-Sadiq successfully rooted out the belief in the imam's divinity from mainstream Shia thought, as evidenced by its absence in later mainstream Shia writings. Nevertheless, there remained at the time groups with extreme views (ghuluww) embedded within mainstream Shia. These Ghulat (lit. 'exaggerators') continued to believe in the divinity of the Shia imams. For instance, the Mufawwida believed that God had delegated (tawfiz) the affairs of this world to the prophet and the Shia imams. Such beliefs were also championed by al-Mufaddal ibn Umar al-Ju'fi, a financial agent of al-Kazim. However modern Shi'i scholars have accepted Mufaddal as a pious companion, and the works attributed to him false.

There is no evidence that any of the Shia imams personally subscribed to these extremist views.

=== Redemptive suffering ===
By some Shia accounts, al-Kazim died for the sins of his followers. This is explained in a tradition attributed to him, "God became wrathful with the Shia, so he made me choose between them or myself and I shielded them, by God, with my soul". This tradition may also suggest al-Kazim's premonition about his own death. These sins may have been disloyalty (to the imam) and abandoning taqiya (religious dissimulation), according to the Twelver traditionist Muhammad ibn Ya'qub al-Kulayni (d. 941), who adds that the latter sin revealed the activities of al-Kazim and led to his imprisonment. Harun indeed carried out a campaign of arrests in 795 to decimate the underground network of local Shia representatives (wukala), which may have led to the final arrest of al-Kazim.

== Descendants ==
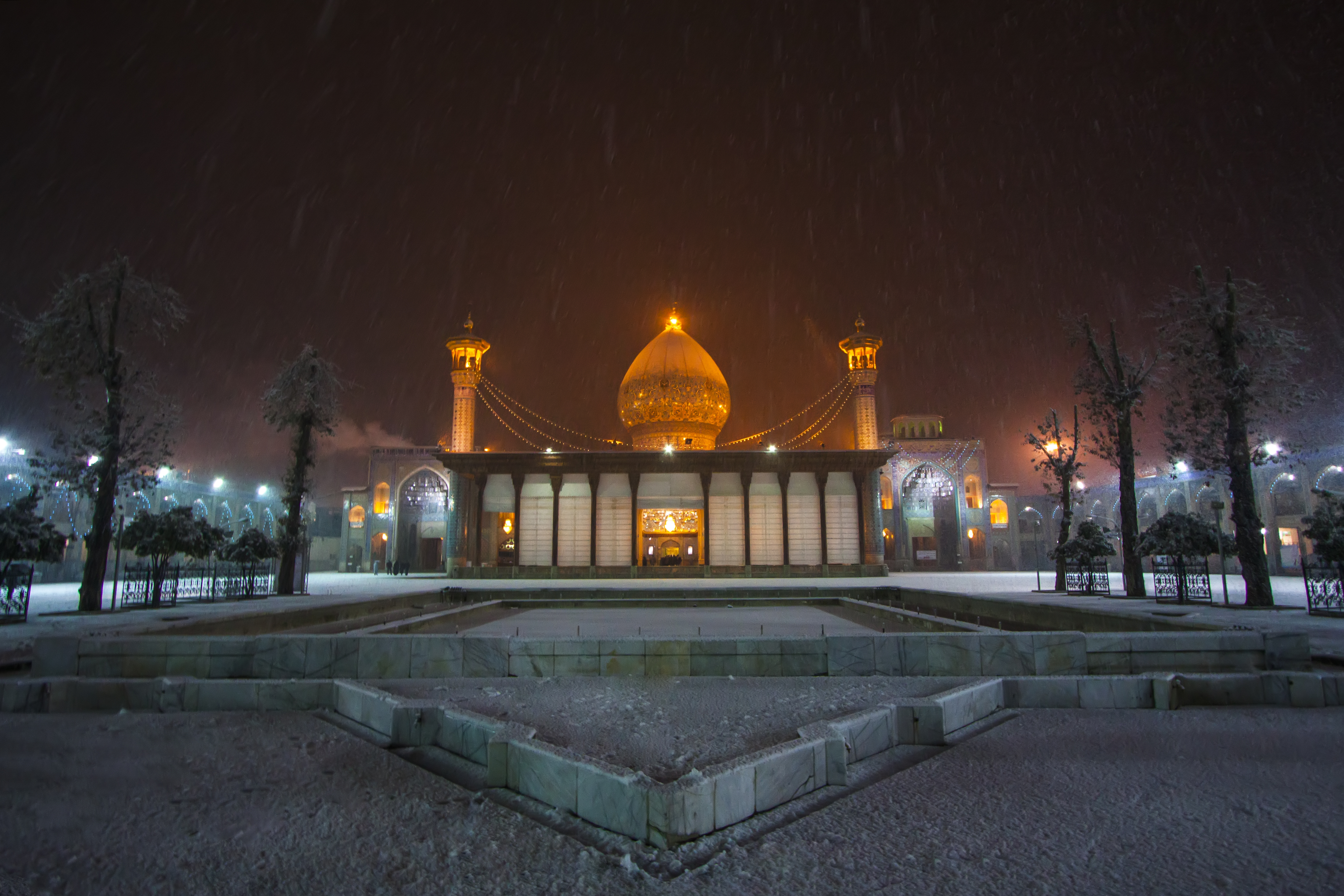
The Shah Cheragh shrine in Shiraz, Iran, is the burial site of Ahmad, son of Musa al-Kazim

By some reports, al-Kazim had 18 sons and 23 daughters, while other reports suggest 33 to 60 children. According to the historian D.M. Donaldson (d. 1976), these children were all sired with freed slaves (umm walads), including Najma (or Tuktam) who bore al-Kazim his son and successor, Ali al-Rida. Before he died in 818, al-Rida was briefly the heir to the Abbasid caliph al-Ma'mun (r. 813–833). Abbas, another son of al-Kazim, became the governor of Kufa. Three other sons — Zayd ibn Musa al-Kazim, Ibrahim ibn Musa al-Kazim, and Isma'il — participated in the unsuccessful 815 revolt of Abu'l-Saraya against the Abbasids. The shrines of some of the children of al-Kazim are sites of pilgrimage in Iran, including those of Fatima bint Musa in the city of Qom, Ali al-Rida in Mashhad, Husayn in Qazvin, and Ahmad in Shiraz. The Safavid dynasty (r. 1501–1736) in Iran also claimed descent from al-Kazim, though this claim has been questioned. His lineage may account for about seventy percent of the descendants of the prophet (the sayyids) in Iran. A report implies that al-Kazim allowed (at least one of the) women in his household to study religious sciences, despite outside objections.

== Character ==
Musa is often referred to as al-Kazim (lit. 'forbearing' or 'he who restrains his anger'), an honorific title suggesting mild manner and patience. For instance, he is said to have kindly treated an abusive opponent, who became an adherent in consequence. He was also known by the title al-Abd al-Salih (lit. 'the holy servant' or 'the righteous servant of God'). This title was a reference to his piety, for he is said to have spent most of his life in prayer and solitary contemplation. Among his predecessors, al-Kazim has been compared in benevolence and asceticism to Ali ibn Husayn Zayn al-Abidin, the fourth of the Twelve Imams. The kunya of al-Kazim was Abu al-Hasan, the first, so as to distinguish him from the eighth and the tenth imams in Twelver Shia who shared the same kunya. Another kunya of al-Kazim was Abu Ibrahim.

The Sunni historian Ibn Khallikan (d. 1282) praises al-Kazim in his biographical Wafayat al-a'yan: "He [al-Kazim] entered one evening into the mosque of God's Apostle and, just as the night was setting in, he made a prostration [in worship] which lasted until the morning, and during that time he was heard to request without intermission, "O thou who art the object of our fear! O thou whom it becometh to show mercy! Let thy kindly pardon be granted to me whose sin is so grievous!" The same source extols al-Kazim as generous and benevolent, "When a man had spoken ill of him, he sent him a purse containing one thousand dinars", and, "He used to tie up in packets sums of three hundred, or four hundred, or two hundred dinars and distribute them in the city of Medina." Musa al-Kazim was also probably a gifted polemicist: The celebrated Sunni jurist Abu Hanifa (d. 767) was apparently once silenced by a young al-Kazim, while a group of Christians who came to dispute with him about religion subsequently came to accept Islam.

== Legacy ==
All successors of al-Sadiq, including al-Kazim, were largely removed from public life by the Abbasids, through imprisonment or surveillance. Musa al-Kazim nevertheless taught Shia beliefs, and played a key role in eradicating extreme views (ghuluww) from mainstream Shia thought. Some letters attributed to al-Kazim in his captivity years have survived, and his answers to legal questions are available in Wasiyya fi al-aql. He advised others that supplication (dua) could avert even predestined calamities, and numerous supplications are credited to him. His saying, "The jurists (fuqaha, sing. faqīh) who are believers (mu'min, i.e., Shia) are the citadels of Islam", has been reinterpreted in recent times to encourage an active social role for religious scholars.

Musa al-Kazim is revered in Sunni Islam and considered a reliable traditionist by Sunni scholars, including Ahmad ibn Hanbal (d. 855), who quotes from al-Kazim in support of the Alids. Some traditions attributed to al-Kazim were collected by the Sunni scholar Abu Bakr Muhammad ibn Abd-Allah al-Bazzaz (d. 965) in his Musnad al-Kazim, which is extant. Musa al-Kazim is also venerated among the Sufis. Among Sufi saints, Shaqiq al-Balkhi (d. 809–810), for instance, regarded al-Kazim as a holy person (Wali Allah, min al-abdal) and a devout worshipper, while Ma'ruf al-Karkhi (d. c. 815) and Bishr the Barefoot (d. 841) were affiliated with the imam. In particular, a historical account credits al-Kazim with the spiritual awakening of Bishr. Musa al-Kazim is also a link in the Golden Chain (Silsilat al-dhahab), which is the initiatic line connecting the Sufis with the Islamic prophet Muhammad.

== See also ==
- Ali al-Rida
- Fatimah bint Musa
- Hajar Khatoon Mosque
- Ja'far al-Sadiq
- Isma'il ibn Jafar
- Muhammad al-Dibaj
- Abd-Allah al-Aftah
- List of extinct Shia sects

== Bibliography ==
- Abbas, Hassan (2021). The Prophet's Heir - The Life of Ali ibn Abi Talib. Yale University Press. ISBN 9780300252057.
- Adamec, Ludwig W. (2017). Historical Dictionary of Islam (Third ed.). Rowman & Littlefield. ISBN 9781442277236.
- Algar, Hamid (1990). "Imām Mūsā al-Kāzim and Sūfī Tradition". Islamic Culture. 64 (1): 1–14.
- Amir-Moezzi, Mohammad Ali (1994). The Divine Guide in Early Shi'ism - The Sources of Esotericism in Islam. Translated by Streight, David. State University of New York Press. ISBN 0791421228.
- Asatryan, Mushegh (2000). "Mofażżal al-Jo'fi". Encyclopaedia Iranica (Online ed.).
- Ayoub, Mahmoud M. (1978). Redemptive Suffering in Islām - A Study of the Devotional Aspects of 'Āshūrā' in Twelver Shī'ism. De Gruyter. ISBN 9783110803310.
- Baghestani, Esmail (2014). "Jawad, Imam". Encyclopaedia of the World of Islam (in Persian). Vol. 11. Encyclopaedia Islamica Foundation. ISBN 9789644470127. Archived from the original on 16 July 2019.
- Buyukkara, M. Ali (2000). "The Schism in the Party of Mūsā al-Kāẓim and the Emergence of the Wāqifa". Arabica. 47/1 (1): 78–99. JSTOR 4057529.
- Campo, Juan E., ed. (2009). "Jaafar al-Sadiq (ca. 699-765)". Encyclopedia of Islam. Facts On File. pp. 386–387. ISBN 9780816054541.
- Daftary, Farhad (1998). "Esmā'īl b. Ja'far al-Ṣādeq". Encyclopaedia Iranica. Vol. VIII/6. pp. 625–626.
- Daftary, Farhad (2004). "Isma'ili". In Martin, Richard C. (ed.). Encyclopedia of Islam and the Muslim world. Vol. 2. Macmillan Publishers. pp. 628–629. ISBN 0028656040.
- Daftary, Farhad (2007). The Ismā'īlīs - Their History and Doctrines (Second ed.). Cambridge University Press. ISBN 9780511355615.
- Daftary, Farhad (2008). "'Alids". In Fleet, Kate; Krämer, Gudrun; Matringe, Denis; Nawas, John; Stewart, Devin J. (eds.). Encyclopaedia of Islam (Three ed.). doi:10.1163/1573-3912_ei3_COM_26329. ISBN 9789004171374.
- Daftary, Farhad (2013). A History of Shi'i Islam. I.B. Tauris. ISBN 9781780768410.
- Daftary, Farhad (2020). Short History of the Ismailis - Traditions of a Muslim Community. Edinburgh University Press. ISBN 9780748679225.
- Dakake, Maria Massi (2007). The Charismatic Community - Shi'ite Identity in Early Islam. State University of New York Press. ISBN 9780791470336.
- Donaldson, Dwight M. (1933). The Shi'ite Religion (A history of Islam in Persia and Irak). Luzac and Company.
- Donner, Fred M. (1999). "Muhammad and the Caliphate". In Esposito, John L. (ed.). Oxford History of Islam. Oxford University Press. pp. 1–62. ISBN 0195107993.
- Gleave, Robert (2008). "Ja'far al-Ṣādeq i. Life". Encyclopaedia Iranica. Vol. XIV/4. pp. 349–351.
- Haider, Najam (2014). Shī'ī Islam - An Introduction. Cambridge University Press. ISBN 9781107625785.
- Halm, Heinz (2004). Shi'ism. Translated by Watson, Janet; Hill, Marian (Second ed.). Edinburgh University Press. ISBN 0748618880.
- Halm, Heinz (2001). "Ḡolāt". Encyclopaedia Iranica. Vol. XI/1. pp. 62–64. ISSN 2330-4804.
- Haywood, John A. (2022). "Ja'far al-Ṣādiq". Encyclopedia Britannica.
- Hulmes, Edward D.A. (2008). "Musa al-Kazim (Abu'l-Hasan Musa ibn Ja'far)". In Netton, Ian Richard (ed.). Encyclopedia of Islamic Civilisation and Religion. Routledge. pp. 456–457. ISBN 9780700715886.
- Hussain, Jassim M. (1986). Occultation of the Twelfth Imam - A Historical Background (PDF). Routledge. ISBN 9780710301581. Archived from the original (PDF) on 15 July 2017.
- Jafri, S. Husain M. (1979). Origins and Early Development of Shi'a Islam. Longman. ISBN 0582780802.
- Kohlberg, E. (2012). "Mūsā Al-Kāẓim". In Bearman, P.; Bianquis, Th.; Bosworth, C.E.; van Donzel, E.; Heinrichs, W.P. (eds.). Encyclopaedia of Islam (Second ed.). Brill Publishers. doi:10.1163/1573-3912_islam_SIM_5563. ISBN 9789004161214.
- Lalani, Arzina R. (2004). Early Shī'ī Thought - The Teachings of Imam Muhammad al-Bāqir. I.B. Tauris. ISBN 9781850435921.
- Mavani, Hamid (2013). Religious Authority and Political Thought in Twelver Shi'ism - From Ali to Post-Khomeini. Routledge. ISBN 9780415624404.
- Madelung, Wilferd (1985). "ʿAlī al-Reżā". Encyclopaedia Iranica. Vol. I/8. pp. 877–880.
- McHugo, John (2017). A Concise History of Sunnis and Shi'is. Georgetown University Press. ISBN 9781626165878.
- Modarressi, Hossein (1993). Crisis and Consolidation in the Formative Period of Shi'ite Islam - Abū Ja'far ibn Qiba al-Rāzī and His Contribution to Imāmite Shī'ite Thought. Darwin Press. ISBN 0878500952.
- Momen, Moojan (1985). An Introduction to Shi'i Islam. Yale University Press. ISBN 9780300035315.
- Nanji, Azim; Daftary, Farhad (2007). "What is Shiite Islam?". In Cornell, Vincent J. (ed.). Voices of Islam. Vol. 1. Greenwood Publishing Group. pp. 217–244. ISBN 978-0275987336.
- Pierce, Matthew (2016). Twelve Infallible Men - The Imams and the Making of Shi'ism. Harvard University Press. ISBN 9780674737075.
- Rahim, Habibeh (2004). "Kazim, Musa al-". In Jestice, Phyllis G. (ed.). Holy People of the World - A Cross-cultural Encyclopedia. Vol. 3. ABC-Clio. pp. 469–470. ISBN 9781576073551.
- Rizvi, Sajjad H. (2006a). "'Ali al-Rida". In Meri, Josef W. (ed.). Medieval Islamic Civilization. Vol. 1. Taylor & Francis. pp. 35–36. ISBN 9780415966917.
- Rizvi, Sajjad H. (2006b). "Tusi, al-, Nasir al-Din (1201–1274 CE)". In Meri, Josef W. (ed.). Medieval Islamic Civilization. Vol. 1. Taylor & Francis. pp. 839–841. ISBN 9780415966917.
- Sachedina, Abdulaziz A. (1981). Islamic Messianism - The Idea of the Mahdi in Twelver Shi'ism. State University of New York Press. ISBN 9780873954587.
- Sharif al-Qarashi, Baqir (2005). The Life of Imam Musa bin Ja'far al-Kazim. Translated by al-Rasheed, Jasim. Ansariyan Publications. ISBN 9789644386398.
- Sourdel, Dominique (1959). Le vizirat abbaside de 749 à 936 (132 à 324 de l'Hégire) (in French). Vol. I. p. 120.
- Strothmann, R. (2012). "Mūsā al-Kāẓim". In Houtsma, M.Th.; Arnold, T.W.; Basset, R.; Hartmann, R. (eds.). Encyclopaedia of Islam (First ed.). doi:10.1163/2214-871X_ei1_SIM_4888. ISBN 9789004082656.
- Tabatabai, Muhammad Husayn (1977). Shi'ite Islam. Translated by Nasr, Seyyed Hossein. State University of New York Press. ISBN 0873953908.
- Takim, Liyakatali (2004). "Ja'far al-Sadiq (c. 701–765)". In Martin, Richard C. (ed.). Encyclopedia of Islam and the Muslim World. Vol. 1. Macmillan Publishers. pp. 369–370. ISBN 0028656040.
- Wardrop, S.F. (1988). Lives of the Imams, Muhammad al-Jawad and 'Ali al-Hadi and the Development of the Shi'ite Organisation (PhD thesis). University of Edinburgh.
- Yavari, Neguin (2004). "'Atabat". In Martin, Richard C. (ed.). Encyclopedia of Islam and the Muslim world. Vol. 1. Macmillan Publishers. p. 88. ISBN 0028656040.

Quotations related to Musa al-Kazim at Wikiquote

Musa al-Kazim of the Ahl al-Bayt Banu Hashim Clan of the Banu Quraish Born: 7th Safar 128 AH ≈ 6 November 745 Died: 25th Rajab 183 AH ≈ 1 September 799
Shia Islam titles
Preceded by Ja'far al-Sadiq	7th Imam of Twelver Shia Islam; 765 – 799	Succeeded by Ali al-Rida
