= Hamida al-Musaffa =

Mother of Musa al-Kazim, the seventh Imam.

Hamida حَميدَة
- Resting place: Medina, Saudi Arabia
- Spouse: Ja'far al-Sadiq
- Children: Musa al-Kazim; Muhammad al-Dibaj; Ishaq; Fatima

Hamida (Arabic: حَميدَة), also referred to in historical sources as Hamida al-Musaffa (Arabic: حَميدَة المُصَفّاة), Hamida al-Barbariyya (Arabic: حَميدَة البَربَريَّة), and Hamida al-Andalusiyya (Arabic: حَميدَة الاندُلُسيَّة), was the wife of Ja'far al-Sadiq, the sixth Imam in Twelver Shi'ism, and the mother of Musa al-Kazim, the seventh Imam.

== Biography ==
Originally a slave-girl, she was given as a gift by Muhammad al-Baqir (the fifth Imam) to his son, Ja'far al-Sadiq. Her ethnic background remains a matter of dispute among early biographers: some accounts identify her as Berber, others as Andalusian, while a number of sources describe her as being of Roman or Persian descent.

Hamida is consistently portrayed in Imami historical literature as a woman of notable virtue and religious learning. She is described as a faqih – that is, a scholar qualified in Islamic jurisprudence – and it is reported that Ja'far al-Sadiq would direct women to her for instruction in religious obligations, and that she would issue authoritative answers to their legal queries. In one well-known saying attributed to the Imam, he is said to have remarked: "Hamida is pure from all impurity; she is like a gold bullion. The angels have continuously watched over her, until from her was born our child – the next Imam and God's gift to us." The honorific al-Musaffa (the Purified) was reportedly bestowed upon her by the Imam himself, and she was also known by other titles, including Lu'lu'a, Muhaddaba, and Sayyidat al-Ima'.

Hamida bore four children to Ja'far al-Sadiq: Musa al-Kazim, Ishaq, Muhammad and Fatima.

Hamida also appears in later traditions as instrumental in arranging the marriage of her son, Musa al-Kazim, to Najma (also recorded as Tuktam), who would later give birth to Ali al-Rida, the eighth Imam. She died in Medina, where her grave is still located and visited by pilgrims.

== See also ==
- Najma Khatun
