= Ali ibn Abi Sa'id =

Abbasid military commander under al-Ma'mun

- Born: Khurasan, Abbasid Caliphate
- Died: 820s Abbasid Caliphate
- Military career
- Allegiance: Abbasid Caliphate
- Branch: Abbasid army
- Service years: c. 812 – 833
- Unit: al-Ma'mun's regiment
- Conflicts: al-Ma'mun's campaigns

Ali ibn Abi Sa'id, also known as Dhu'l-Qalamayn, was an early 9th-century Abbasid official and military commander in the service of Abbasid caliph al-Ma'mun (r. 813–833).

According to al-Ya'qubi, he was the maternal cousin of the Khurasani brothers al-Fadl ibn Sahl and al-Hasan ibn Sahl, two of al-Ma'mun's most powerful officials. Al-Tabari on the other hand considers him as the son of their sister.

He appears in the aftermath of the Siege of Baghdad and al-Ma'mun's victory in the civil war with his brother al-Amin. Al-Hasan was appointed by al-Ma'mun as governor and viceroy of an extensive portion of the Abbasid empire, from Jibal and Fars to Iraq, the Hejaz, and Yemen. Al-Hasan appointed Ali as his deputy for the land tax (kharaj) collection in Iraq.

In 815 he was one of the chief commanders that put down the Alid uprising of Abu al-Saraya al-Sari ibn Mansur in Iraq, defeating the rebel forces at al-Mada'in in late May, recapturing Wasit, and finally capturing Basra from its cruel Alid governor, Zayd ibn Musa al-Kadhim. In the aftermath, he sent a number of his commanders to suppress the offshoots of the uprising in the Hejaz, under Isa ibn Yazid.

He quickly distanced himself from al-Hasan ibn Sahl, and returned to the Caliph in Merv, in the company of al-Hasan's rival, the commander Harthama ibn A'yan. When Baghdad revolted against al-Ma'mun under his uncle Ibrahim ibn al-Mahdi, the Sahlid brothers were blamed by al-Ma'mun's entourage. Especially al-Fadl was accused of concealing the true state of affairs from the caliph. Ali was one of the commanders who testified against the Sahlids, after al-Ma'mun had personally guaranteed their own safety from reprisals. This prompted al-Ma'mun's decision to leave Merv and return to Baghdad. Nevertheless, the commanders were imprisoned and mistreated by al-Fadl, who suspected their involvement in this decision. When al-Fadl was assassinated in February 818, some the murderers, once apprehended, named Ali as the mastermind of the assassination. Although both Ali and the other imprisoned commanders denied their involvement, al-Ma'mun had them executed, and their severed heads sent to al-Hasan ibn Sahl in Iraq along with news of his brother's fate.

== Sources ==
- Bosworth, C. E., ed. (1987). The History of al-Ṭabarī, Volume XXXII: The Reunification of the ʿAbbāsid Caliphate: The Caliphate of al-Maʾmūn, A.D. 813–33/A.H. 198–213. SUNY Series in Near Eastern Studies. Albany, New York: State University of New York Press. ISBN 978-0-88706-058-8. 78–9,81
- Elad, Amikan (2013). "Al-Maʾmūn's Military Units and Their Commanders up to the End of the Siege of Baghdad (195/810–198/813)". In Bernards, Monique (ed.). ʿAbbāsid Studies IV. Occasional Papers of the School of ʿAbbāsid Studies, Leuven, July 5 – July 9, 2010. Gibb Memorial Trust. pp. 245–284. ISBN 978-0-906094-98-3.
