= Hisham ibn al-Hakam =

Early Islamic scholar (c. 8th century AD)

Hisham ibn al-Hakam هِشَامُ بنُ الحَكَمِ

Personal life
- Born: Early 2nd century AH (c. 8th century AD) Kufa, Iraq
- Died: 179 AH / 795-796 AD
- Resting place: Kufa, Iraq
- Main interest(s): Kalam, Imamate
- Notable work(s): Al-Alfaz, Al-Tawhid
- Known for: Defending the doctrine of Imamah, Engaging in frequent debates
- Occupation: Scholar, Theologian, Debater

Religious life
- Religion: Islam
- Denomination: Shia
- Sect: Twelver
- Jurisprudence: Ja'fari

Muslim leader
- Disciple of: Jafar al-Sadiq, Musa al-Kadhim

Abā Muḥammad Hishām ibn al-Ḥakam al-Kūfī al-Kindī (Arabic: أبَا مُحَمَّدٍ هِشَام بنُ الحَكَمِ الكوفِي الكِندِي, d. either 795–6 AD or after 803 AD or 815 AD) commonly known as Hisham ibn al-Hakam, was a Shia Muslim scholar, theologian (mutakallim) and a companion of Imams Jafar al-Sadiq (732–765) and Musa al-Kadhim (765–799). He was famous for his debates regarding Imamate, free will (jabr) and the existence of God. His hadith is considered trustworthy by all Shia scholars. He authored numerous works and treatises on various subjects, including Imamate, refutation of the Mu'tazilites and Qadariyah (determinists) and on Aristotle. His work regarding Imamah apparently formed the base of Firaq al-Shi'a, one of the primary sources on Shiite sects until the 9th century, by Abu Muhammad al-Hasan ibn Musa al-Nawbakhti.

== Biography ==
The exact year of the birth of Hisham is not clear— nor is the year of his death—, but it is understood from several sources that he was born from Hakam (Note: some sources say he was the son of Yazid.) in Kufa, the centre of Iraqi's Shiites, in the beginning of the second century AH, and grew up in Waset. Other sources claim he was from Baghdad. As a young man, he lived a few years in Baghdad where he was conducting business. His family were mawali (non-Arab clients) of the tribe of Kinda, who lived in Kufa at the time.

He was interested in Islamic theology and in his youth he was a follower of Jahm bin Safwan, leader of the Jahmi Sect. Afterwards during some debates with Jafar al-Sadiq, he became one of his followers. Of his first visit to the seventh Shiite imam, he himself says that one day while selling fabric under a shaded tree, Musa al-Kadhim happened to ride by. "He turned his face to me and said, 'O Hisham, selling something in the shadows is similar to cheating, and cheating is unlawful in Islam.'"

== Debates ==
Hisham ibn al-Hakam is most well-known for being a proficient debater. In the world he was evolving, there were many sects and groups with very different opinions, both Muslim and non-Muslim, and there was a rich intellectual life at that time. The majority of Hisham ibn al-Hakam's documented debates were with Mutazilites, and their most common theme was the Imamate. It is said that Hisham was skillful in debates, and that he said: "By God, till this day when I am standing here, nobody has defeated me in religious discourses." Jafar al-Sadiq used to praise him for his debates, in spite of the fact that the Imam would advise his other companions not to engage in discussion, saying "Don't enter into a discussion, especially one about which you have no knowledge."

When a learned Syrian came to al-Sadiq to exchange views on various issues with him, the Imam made him discuss them with some of his disciples instead. Among these disciples were Hamran ibn A'yan, Aban ibn Taghlib, Zurarah, Taiyar, Hisham ibn Salem, and Hisham ibn al-Hakam. Then to show that not every kind of discussion is eligible he said "O Syrian brother, Hamran ibn A'yan came out victorious over you by distorting the facts and using clever speech and set forth his questions to you in a suitable and proper time; and you could not reply to him. Aban ibn Taghlib confused right and wrong to oust you from the combat of the debate and asked you questions to which you could not give the proper answers. But Zurarah defeated you with the help of analogy (Note: to give order from a part to part; to issue an order for a similar matter on the basis of the previous, which is forbidden in Shi'ism.) and allegory. Taiyar, another companion is just like that bird which sits sometimes and then rises up and you are just like that wingless bird which has no power to rise up after sitting down once. Hisham ibn Salem used to put questions again and again cleverly. But Hisham ibn Hakam entered the arena with reasoning and diction and argued with you by means of logical reasoning."

== Accusations of heresy ==
Many Islamic groups have attributed heretic views to Hisham ibn al-Hakam. A major accusation towards him is that of anthropomorphism. Qaḍī ʿAbd al-Jabbar accused him of being the source of all Shiite heretical views, and he was generally considered an arch-heretic. As Alexander Hainy Khaleeli underlines, the accusation of anthropomorphism is very unusual for a Shiite, as this belief is not sanctioned by any Shiite authority. In fact, Hisham ibn al-Hakam, according to Livnat Holtzman and Miriam Ovadia is even "presented in the sources as the most notorious archetype of a corporealist." They cite the report by Abu 'l-Hudhayl that "Hisham declared that God was a three-dimensional body, because only bodies have existence." Abu 'l-Hudhayl allegedly pointed to a mountain on the outskirts of Mecca (Mount Abu Qubays) and asked Hisham if his God was greater or the mountain, to which Hisham apparently answered that the mountain was bigger than God.

Indeed surprising is the variety of forms of anthropomorphism attributed to Hisham ibn al-Hakam: from the idea that God has a three-dimensional body smaller than a mountain, to the idea that 'God is an eternal, luminous body' or that God's body is a light (like) other lights, solid (muṣmat) and of the appearance of a pearl whose every facet is uniform. Al-Razi also reported the famously attributed belief that Hisham ibn al-Hakam professed that God has no foreknowledge of things. As Hainy Khaleeli points out, it is surprising to observe that, if Hisham actually held such beliefs, he never reported any such thing from the Imams, while he was a proficient reporter of Imami hadith. Besides, there is no source ever showing Hisham professing any such beliefs himself. Al-Sharif al-Murtada suggests that ibn al-Hakam's expression that God has 'a body unlike other bodies' is simply badly formulated, or expressed in opposition to the Mutazilites who were claiming that 'God is a thing unlike other things', in order to show that their claim led to an unacceptable conclusion.

A major reason for the spread of these rumors is the jealousy felt by ibn al-Hakam's companions, due to his being liked and favored by the Imams, his great debating skills, his sharp argumentation. His critics being originally some of his Shiite companions, non-Shiite theologians based themselves on their reports, and built ibn al-Hakam's image into that of a major heretic character. This is connected with Hisham ibn al-Hakam being considered by both Shiite and non-Shiite sources as the founder of mainstream Shiism proper.

== Reported debates ==
=== On Imamate ===
Hisham wrote many books concerning the subject of the Imamate, and scholars of his time regarded him as the defender of the doctrine of "Imamate" and the "eye of the shiite" as he was a watchful protector of those who apposed imamat.

It is said that once a Syrian came to the Imam and he made some of his disciples to discuss with him in turn. Finally, the Imam turned his face to the Syrian and said: "If you like, you could also discuss with this young man - Hisham." The man addressed Hisham rudely and said, "O boy! If you have anything to say about the Imamate of your Imam, tell me?" Hisham, while shivering from anger said, "O sir, has your Lord created the human beings in vain and left them without any leader and guide?" The Syrian replied: "the Kind Creator is generous towards His servants and is not neglectful of them." Hisham said, "If it is just as you say, then describe the conditions of their leadership and guidance." The Syrian replied, "God has appointed His Hujjat (Guide) for the human beings, so that they might not dispute among themselves and not separate from each other. Rather they must love each other and come to friendly terms between themselves. The guide must explain the commandments of the Creator for them."

Hisham asked: "Who is that guide and leader?" The Syrian replied: "The Prophet of God." Hisham said: "When the Prophet left this world, who became responsible for the guidance of these people?" The Syrian replied: "The Quran and the traditions of the Prophet." Hisham said: "Today, it is a very long time since the death of the Prophet. Do you think the Book and the traditions alone can solve the disputes?" He replied: "Yes, of course, they are enough and sufficient." Hisham said: "If it is just as you say, then why do you and I dispute and why have you travelled such a long way from Syria?..."

=== With the chief of the Kharajites ===
The chief of the Kharijites was a learned man. Before starting with the debate Hisham said to his opponent that he was ready for the debate but they should appoint a referee among themselves so that if the discussion "be lengthy and reach a place where there may occur some problems and complications and both of us may not accept the reality due to obstinacy… so he may be able to make us return at the time of our deviation from the right path." When the Kharijite agreed Hisham asked "who should be this referee and a follower of which religion? Should he be one of my supporters or one of your friends? Or one who oppose both of our beliefs or be opposed to the Muslim community and Islam?"

The Kharijite said "You should select anyone whom you like, because you are a just man and I am satisfied with your selection." "In my opinion," said Hisham, "it is a difficult task because if that judge comes from among my supporters then you will not be safe from his party spirit; and if he comes from among your supporters then I may not be safe. On the contrary, if he is from among the opponents and against both of our beliefs, then none of us may be safe from the harm of his unjustified arbitration. Then it is advisable that one man from each side oversees our speech; and witnesses our discussion and debate and arbitrates according to justice and fairness," recommended Hisham.

When the Kharijite agreed Hisham turned his face towards Yahya who held this discussion and said: "O Vizier (minister), be a witness that I have disapproved of his reasoning and have condemned him and have made him helpless. He has nothing to say anymore and I also do not need to debate with him." And when they asked him how he condemned the man while the discussion had not started yet, he said "Is it not true that in the beginning these Kharajites, (Note: 2." Kharajites are a group of people who were at first the followers of Ali and Shiite. Then at the Battle of Siffin, due to the insistence of the army, the problem of arbitration occurred. According to this, one person from Muawiyah's side and one person from Ali's side should be appointed and whatever they announced, all other people should obey their decision. Contrary to the desire of Ali, Abu Musa Ashaari was appointed from Ali's side and 'Amr ibn al-'As from Muawiyah's side was appointed for this purpose. After some time 'Amr ibn al-'As cheated him cleverly and cunningly and the story ended in favour of Muawiyah. As a result of this trickery a group came out as opponents against Ali and said: Ali, because you accepted the arbitration of Mu'awiyah and Amr As who were infidels, we do not accept you anymore. Their slogan was: "There is no verdict except that of Allah." At last Ibn Muljim, who was one of them, killed Ali.") were of the same opinion as we were concerning the matter of Imamate and the Wilayah of Ali until the problem of the arbitration occurred in the Battle of Siffin? They acted rudely… and called him (Ali) an infidel because of the acceptance of the arbitration although they themselves compelled him to accept this matter. Now this learned man who is himself respectable and reliable among his followers, has accepted the arbitration and judgement of the two men without any compulsion and force - one of these two men is my follower who is an infidel according to his Kharijite belief and the other is his own supporter. Both of them have different beliefs and are opposed to each other. Now if he is right in choosing the arbitration and has chosen the right path, then there is no cause for him to criticize Amirul Mu'mineen who is more worthy and wise..."

== Books ==
Hisham wrote many books on Islamic issues. Mohsen Amili, refuting Jalaluddin Seuti who had said that the first writer of fundamental of Muslim laws was al-Shafi'i, mentions the names of some scholars to prove that Hisham is the first man who wrote books on the fundamentals of speculative theology. Hisham was also skilled in argumentation about the Creator, unity of God, attributes of His Glory, discussion on free will, and natural philosophy. In spite of these, however, he has not always been a favorable character. Some scholars blamed him for dualism and infidelity and writes that he believed in corporeality of God. Responding the accusation, 'Alamul Huda, a Shiite scholar writes: "this famous sentence 'God is corporeal but not like other corporal bodies' which Hisham has been accused of saying, has been interpreted in different ways." Hisham was, he says, debating with Muʿtazila and he had to use their own phraseology.

Al-Shahrastani, the writer of the book Al-Milal wa al-Nihal said a similar thing when he wrote that Hisham used this phrase during his debates with the group of Ghulat (extremists).

Some of his works:

- Kitab al-Imama (Book on the Imamate)
- Kitab al-Dalalat ala Huduth al-Ashya (Book on the Signs for the Creation of Things)
- Kitab al-Radd ala al-Zanadiqa (Book on the Answers to the Unbelievers)
- Kitab Ashab al-Ithnayn (Book on the Companions of the Two Persons)
- Kitab al-Tawhid (Book on the Oneness of Allah)
- Kitab al-Radd ala Hisham al-Jawaliqi (Book on the Answers to Hisham al-Jawaliqi)
- Kitab al-Radd ala Ashab al-Tabaiya (Book on the Answers to those Who Believe in Natures)
- Kitab al-Shaykh wa al-Ghulam (Book on the Old Man and the Boy)
- Kitab al-Tadbeer (Book on Management)
- Kitab al-Maydan (Book on the Field)
- Kitab al-Mizan (Book on the Balance)
- Kitab al-Radd ala men qala fi Imamat al-Mafdul (Book on the Answers to Those Who Believe in the Imamate of the Less Excellent)
- Kitab Ikhtilaf al-Nas fi Imamat al-Mafdul (Book on that the People are Different over the Imamate of al-Mafdul)
- Kitab al-Wasiya wa al-Radd ala men ankereha (Book on the Testament and the Answers to Those Who Deny It)
- Kitab al-Jabur wa al-Qadar (Book on Compulsion and Fate).
- Kitab al-Hakamayn (Book on the Two Arbitrators)
- Kitab al-Radd'ala al-Muʿtazila fi Telha wa al-Zubayr (Book on the Answers to the Muʿtazilites Concerning Telha and al-Zubayr)
- Kitab al-Qeder (Book on Fate)
- Kitab al-Alfad (Book on the Words)
- Kitab al-Ma„rifa (Book on Knowledge)
- Kitab al-Istita'a (Book on Capability)
- Kitab al-Themaniyat Abbwab (Book on Eight Chapters)
- Kitab al-Radd ala Shaytan al-Taq (Book on the Answers to Shaytan al-Taq)
- Kitab al-Akhbar kayfa tufteh (Book on How the Traditions Are Opened)
- Kitab al-Radd ala Aristotle fi al-Tawhid (Book on the Answers to Aristotle in Monotheism)
- Kitab al-Radd ala al-Muʿtazila (Book on the Answers to the Muʿtazilites)
- Kitab al-Majalis fi al-Imama (Book on the Gatherings concerning the Imamate)
- Kitab Ilal al-Tehreem (Book on the Causes of Prohibition)
- Kitab al-Radd ala al-Qederiya (Book on the Answers to the Fatalists) Imam Musa read it, and praised him saying: "He has left nothing!"
- Kitab al-Fara'id (Book on the Religious Duties).
