= Mu'min al-Taq =

Shia theologian of the 8th century

Mu'min al-Ṭāq مؤمن الطّاق

Personal life
- Died: 160 or 180 Hijri; 777 or 796 CE
- Notable work(s): Kitab al-Imamah, Kitab al-radd 'ala' al-Mu'tazila fi imamat al-mafdul
- Other name: Abū Ja'far

Religious life
- Religion: Islam
- Denomination: Shia
- Jurisprudence: Ja'fari

Muslim leader
- Disciple of: Ja'far al-Sadiq, Musa al-Kazim
- Influenced by: Ali al-Sajjad, Muhammad al-Baqir, Ja'far al-Sadiq, Musa al-Kazim

Abū Ja'far Muḥammad ibn 'Alī ibn Nu'mān al-Bajalī al-Kūfī (Arabic: أبو جعفر محمّد بن علي بن نعمان البجالي الكوفي), commonly known as Mu'min al-Ṭāq (Arabic: مؤمن الطاق) was a distinguished Shia Muslim theologian (mutakallim) and a companion of Ja'far al-Sadiq (732–765) and Musa al-Kazim (765–799), whose debates regarding Imamate with other scholars are famous. He lived in the 2nd/8th century, and was from the tribe of Bajila from Kufa.

He was known in the polemic and debate circles of the time, and was reportedly renowned for providing incisive and thought-provoking responses to questions from his opponents. In particular, he is famous for getting into a heated argument with the renowned scholar and jurist Abu Hanifa, as well as debating and authoring a refutation of the Mu'tazilites. He advocated for Imamah and held that the Imams are the ones with the absolute knowledge required to lead Muslims and humanity to felicity at its highest level. He wrote a number of works including Kitab al-Imama and Kitab al-radd 'ala' al-Mu'tazila fi imamat al-mafdul.

== Name ==
Muhammed ibn Ali ibn al-Nu'man's kunya was Abu Ja'far. His opponents nicknamed him Shaytan al-Taq (Arabic: شيطان الطاق) (Satan of taq). This is attributed, among other things, to the fact that he was a money exchanger in a market in "Taq al-Mahamil" in Kufa, and due to his expertise to spot counterfeit money he earned the nickname. According to another source, Abu Hanifa was the first to call him by this nickname when he defeated the Haruriyya in a discussion. In contrast to Abu Hanifa, the Shias of Kufa gave him the nickname Mu'min al-Taq (lit. the true believer of the Gateway). It is said that when he defeated Abu Hanifa in a debate, Abu Hanifa was the first one to call him "Shaytan al-Taq" for the first time. And when Hisham ibn al-Hakam heard this, he was the first person who called him "Mu'min al-Taq".

== Position ==
Abu Ja'far Muhammad ibn Nu'man al-Ahwal stood out among the Kufa speculative theologians who connected the Imamate question to other fundamental scholastic problems. The heresiographers refer to his circle as AnNu'maniya, and he differentiated himself from the rest of Ja'far al-Sadiq's followers via his mastery of dialectics, his theological knowledge, and the sharpness of his rejoinders in debates with his opponents. Al-Ahwal, a fervent Shi'i, was initially one of the most dedicated followers of al-Baqir, whose claims he defended against Zayd. Later, he developed a reputation as a renowned theologian and became a passionate supporter first of al-Sadiq and then of Musa al-Kazim.

== Al-Sadiq's view ==
Al-Sadiq obliged Mu'min al-Taq to debate with the religious intellectuals of that day. In the meantime, he prohibited his companions from doing this due to lack of mastery in this field. Al-Sadiq praised him saying: "The most lovable people, alive and dead, to me are: Burayd ibn Mu'awiya al-'Ijli, Zurarah ibn A'yun, Muhammad bin Muslim, and Abu Ja'far al-Ahwal (Mu'min al-Taq)."

When al-Sadiq learned that this well-known follower was expressing differing viewpoints while participating in theological debates, he made the following statement:, "If I were to approve of and express satisfaction with the theological views which you (i.e., Mu'min al-Taq and his followers) express, I should be guilty of error (ḍalāl).On the other hand, it would be hard for me to dissociate from these views. After all, we are few and our enemies legion." Dissociation (bara'a), then, is a luxury which the Imams can ill afford, even if Mu'min al-Taq, Zurara, and their ilk deserve it in principle.

== Debates ==
According to some hadiths, he debated Zayd ibn Ali with regard to the Imamate of al-Sadiq. Also his debates with Abu Hanifa, Ibn Abi Khidra, Dahhak Shadi from Khawarij, Ibn Abi l-'Awja', and others are cited.

It is said that al-Dahhak, from the Kharijites, went in revolt in Kufa and controlled it. Al-Dahhak headed their movements and called himself the Commander of the faithful. Mu'min al-Taq turned to him and said: "Surely I am a man with knowledge of my religion. I have heard that you describe justice, so I would like to enter (a debate) with you." Al-Dahhak was happy at that and regarded it as a victory for him, so he said to his companions: "Certainly, if this (Mu'min al-Taq) enter (a debate) with you, he will benefit you." Mu'min al-Taq approached al-Dahhak and asked him the following question:

- Why did you renounce Ali ibn Abi Talib?
- Because he appointed someone as arbitrator in respect with the religion of Allah.
- Do you regard as lawful killing him or fighting him who appoints someone as arbitrator in respect with the religion of Allah?
- Yes?
- Tell me about the religion on which I have come to debate with you: If my demonstration overcomes yours or yours overcomes mine, then who will draw the attention of the mistaken to his mistake and decide the rightness of the right? Therefore, we have no escape from that we must appoint someone to decide between us.
- This-he indicated with his hand to a companion of his-is the arbitrator between us; he has knowledge of the religion.

Mu'min al-Taq found a way to criticize him and to abolish his beliefs, saying to him:

- Have you appointed this person as an arbitrator in respect with the religion on which I have to debate with you?
- Yes.

Mu'min al-Taq came near to the Kharijites and showed them the mistakes of their leader, saying to them: "Surely, your leader has appointed someone as an arbitrator in respect with Allah's religion; then that is up to you!" The Kharijites attacked al-Dahhak and cut him into pieces with their own swords.

== Works ==
1. Kitab al-Imama (a book of the Imamate).
2. Kitab al-Ma'rifa (a book on knowledge).
3. Kitab Ithbat al-Wasiya (the Establishment of the Will).
4. Kitab al-Radd 'alaa al-Mu'tazila fi Imamat al-Mafdul (a book on refuting the beliefs of the Mu'tazilites in the Imamate of the less excellent).
5. Kitab fi amar Talha wa al-Zubayr wa 'Aa'isha (a book on the affair of Talha, al-Zubayr, and 'Aa'isha).
6. Kitab If'al, La Taf'al (a book on do, do not do).
7. Al-Munazara ma'a Abu Hanifa (a book on the debate with Abu Hanifa).
8. Kalamihi ma'a al-Khawarijj (his Theological Debates with the Kharijites)

== See also ==
- Imamah (Twelver Shi`i Doctrine)
- Twelver theology
- Islamic theology

== Bibliography ==
- Lalani, Arzina R. (2004). Early Shi'i Thought: The Teachings of Imam Muhammad Al-Baqir. I. B. Tauris. ISBN 978-1850435921.
- Sharif al-Qarashi, Baqir (2000). Written at Iraq. The Life Of Imam Musa Bin Ja'far aL-Kazim. Translated by al-Rasheed, Jasim. Qum: Ansariyan Publications. ISBN 9781546508021.
- Jafri, S.H.M (1979). Origins and Early Development of Shia Islam. London: Longman.
- Kohlberg, Etan (2020). Ehteshami, Amin (ed.). In Praise of the Few. Studies in Shiʿi Thought and History. Brill. ISBN 978-90-04-40697-1.
