= Fatima bint Musa =

Daughter of the Seventh Twelver Imam

Fatima bint Musa فَاطِمَة بِنْت مُوسَىٰ
- Title: al-Ma'suma (lit. 'the immaculate')

Personal life
- Born: c. 790 CE Medina, Abbasid Empire
- Died: 816 or 817 Qom, Abbasid Empire
- Resting place: Fatima al-Ma'suma Shrine
- Parents: Musa al-Kazim (father); Najma (mother)
- Relatives: Ali al-Rida (brother)

Religious life
- Religion: Islam
- Sect: Shia (Twelver)

Fatima bint Musa (Arabic: فَاطِمَة بِنْت مُوسَىٰ, romanized: Fāṭima bint Mūsā), circa 790–816 CE, commonly known as Fatima al-Ma'suma (Arabic: فَاطِمَة ٱلْمَعْصُومَة, romanized: Fāṭima al-Maʿṣūma, lit. 'Fatima, the immaculate'), was the daughter of Musa al-Kazim (d. 799) and sister of Ali al-Rida (d. 818), the seventh and eighth Imams in Twelver Shia. A young Fatima left her hometown of Medina in about 816 to visit her brother al-Rida in Merv, but fell ill along the way and died in Qom, located in modern-day Iran. She is revered for her piety in Twelver Shia and her shrine in Qom is a major destination for pilgrimage.

== Biography ==
Fatima was born circa 790 CE in Medina to Musa al-Kazim, the seventh Imam in Twelver Shia. When Musa died in 799 in the prison of the Abbasid caliph Harun al-Rashid (r. 786–809), possibly poisoned, a significant group of his followers accepted the imamate of his son Ali al-Rida, brother of Fatima. In 816, al-Rida was summoned to Khorasan by the Abbasid caliph al-Ma'mun (r. 813–833), who designated him as the heir apparent in 817, possibly to mitigate the frequent Shia revolts. Fatima then set out to join her brother in Merv but fell ill along the way in the Sunni town of Saveh. There she asked to be taken to the nearby Shia town of Qom, where she died a few days later, possibly after seventeen days. Another account states that a local Shia figure by the name of Musa ibn Khazraj al-Ash'ari brought Fatima to Qom and hosted her during her final days. There are also some reports that Fatima was poisoned, though they are not mentioned in Tarikh-e Qom, a history of Qom written in 988 by Hasan ibn Muhammad Qomi. Fatima thus died in 816, or in 817. Her age at the time is not known with certainty but she must have been at least twenty-one years old, considering that her father Musa was last imprisoned in 795 until his death in 799.

== Place in Twelver Shia ==
Fatima is known by the title al-Ma'suma (Arabic: ٱلْمَعْصُومَة, lit. 'the immaculate, the infallible'). It is uncertain when and how she received this title but she was already referred to as such in an order issued by Jahan Shah (r. c. 1438 – 1467), the Qara Qoyunlu king of Iran. Fatima is revered as the "embodiment of the feminine virtues" in Twelver Shia, where she is recognized for piety and religious scholarship, and often compared to Fatima bint Muhammad (d. 632), daughter of the Islamic prophet Muhammad (d. 632). She is revered by Twelvers as a saint who would intercede on the Judgement Day and performs miracles, such as healing those with incurable diseases.

== Shrine ==
Fatima was buried outside of Qom in a plot of land owned by Musa al-Ash'ari, which became a public endowment later. The house where she stayed, the site of her prayers, became a mosque outside of Qom. Her shrine has been developed by successive generations, patronized by the Buyids (r. 934–1062) and the Seljuks (r. 1037–1194), as well as the Qara Qoyunlus (r. 1374–1468) and the Aq Qoyunlus (r. 1378–1503). The current imposing complex, however, largely dates to the Safavid (r. 1501–1736) and Qajar (r. 1789–1925) eras.

Qom owes its status as a pilgrimage destination to the shrine of Fatima al-Ma'suma, and pilgrimage to her shrine is encouraged in traditions attributed to her brother al-Rida and his son Muhammad al-Jawad (d. 835), the ninth Imam in Twelver Shia. The city thus became an important center for Shia activity and learning from the eighth century onward, reaching a peak in the tenth century, until it was destroyed in 1224 during the first Mongul invasion of Persia. The Persian historian Hamdallah Mustawfi found the city in ruins in his visit in the fourteenth century, but it reemerged during the Safavid period. In particular, the shrine was further developed in 1519 by Shah Bigum, the daughter of the Safavid king Ismail I (r. 1501–1524), while the Safavid king Abbas I (r. 1588–1629) financially supported the shrine and built there a school and pilgrim hospice. He did so partly to encourage pilgrimage to Shia shrines within his territory just before the Sunni Ottomans established in 1638 their rule over Iraq, where the shrines of most Shia Imams are located. The theological law school there was founded in 1533, known as Feyziyya after the Safavid-era philosopher Mohsen Fayz Kashani (d. 1680). Qom later benefited from its proximity to Tehran, the royal residence of the Qajars, who further developed the shrine and buried their dead in the city. The Qajar-era jurist Mirza-ye Qomi (d. 1815) particularly helped raise the academic profile of the seminary school. Another phase of growth began with the arrival of Abdolkarim Haeri Yazdi (d. 1937) in 1921, who founded the present theological center (hawza-ye elmiyye). Among his students was Ruhollah Khomeini (d. 1989) who led the Iranian revolution in 1979.

The shrine of Fatima al-Ma'suma in Qom, Iran
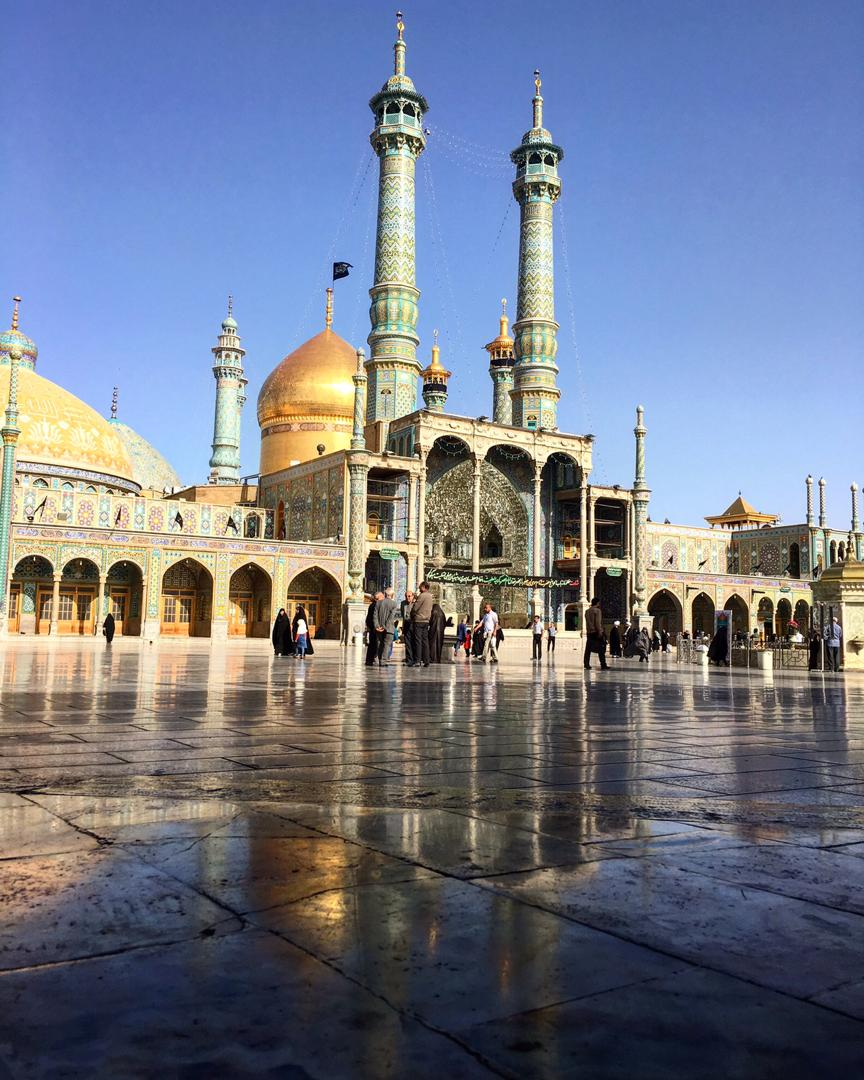

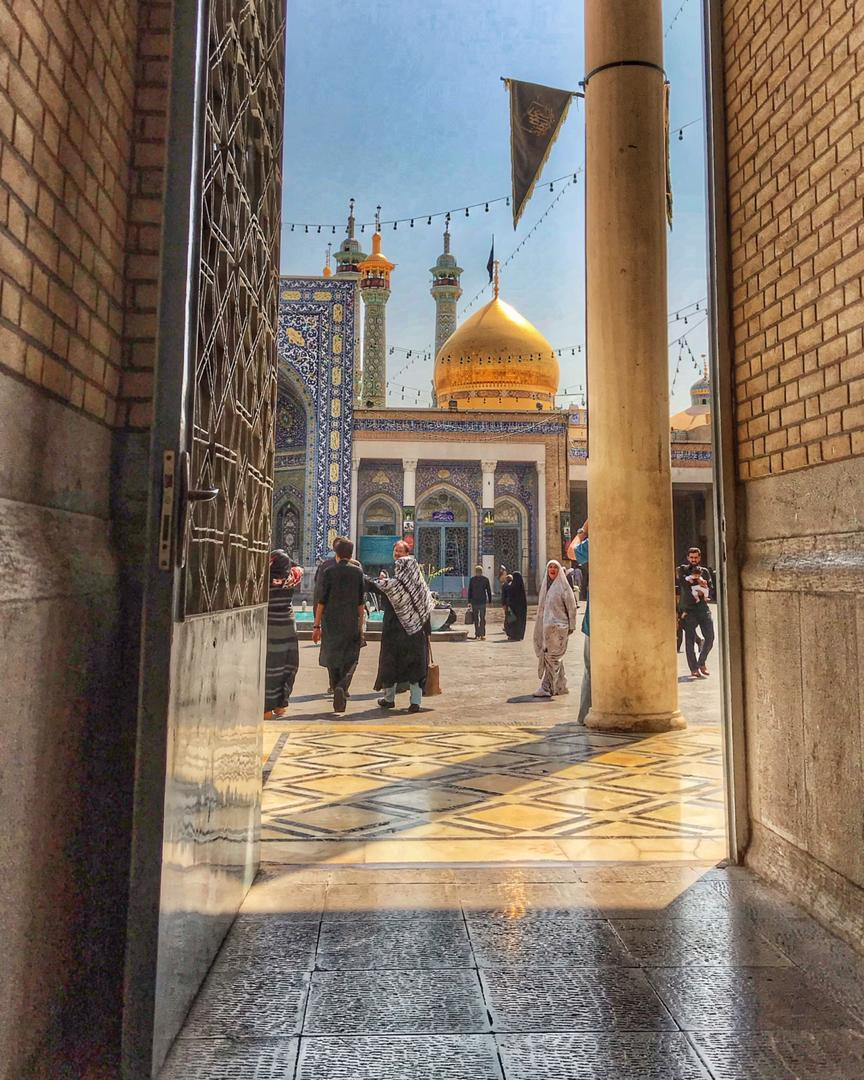

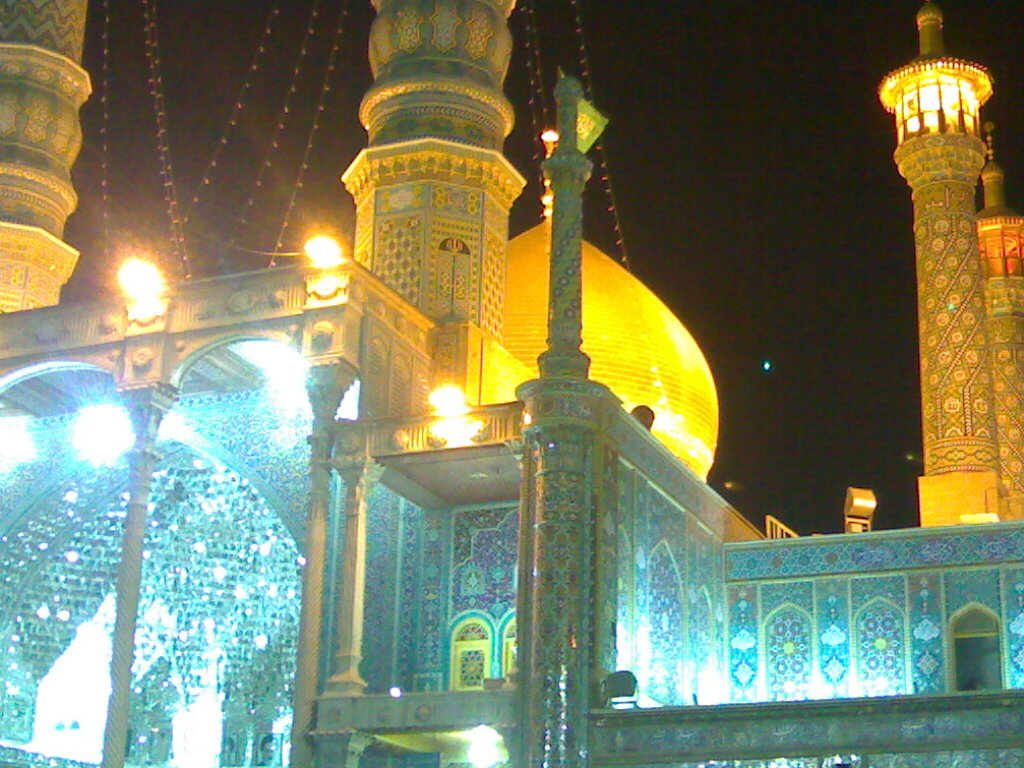

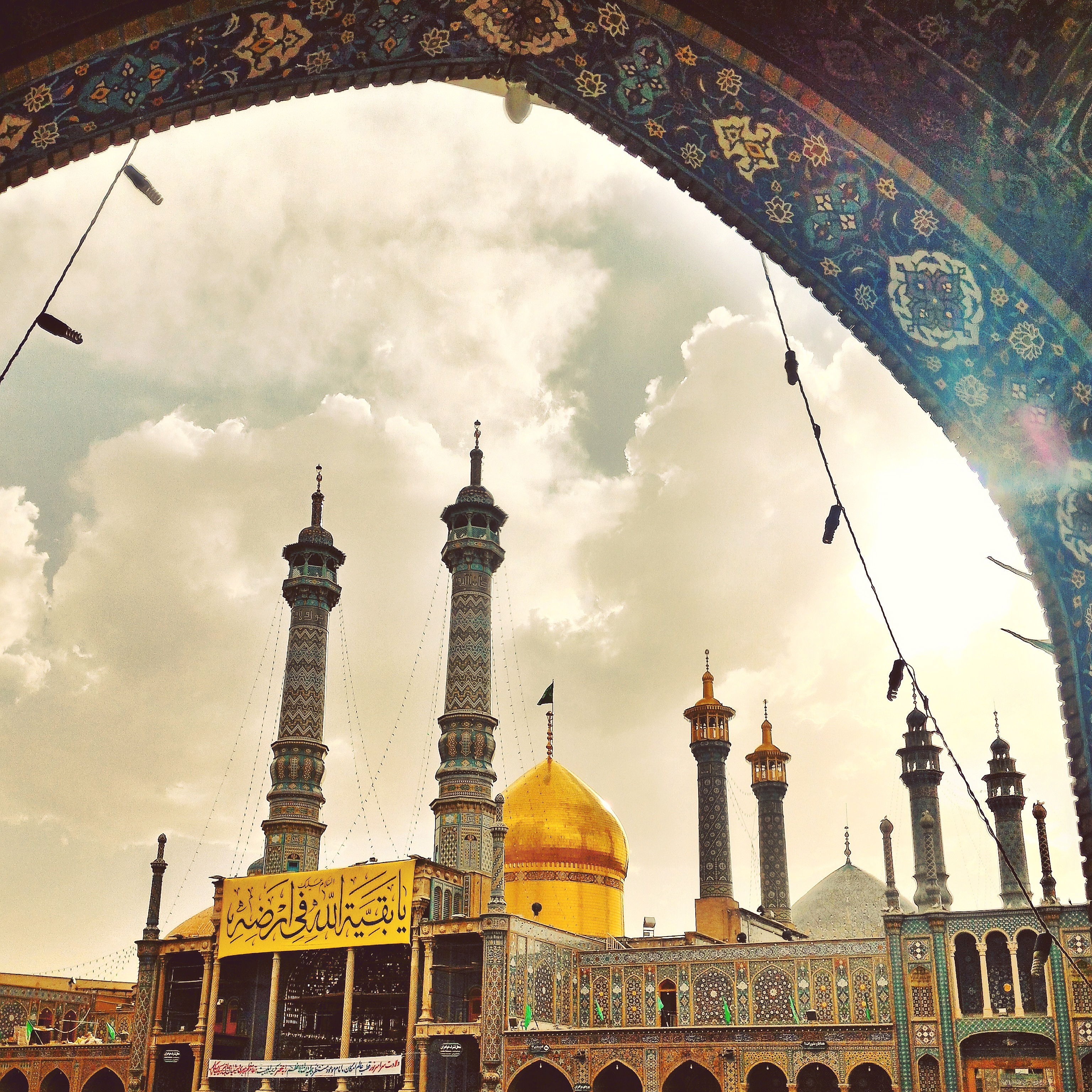
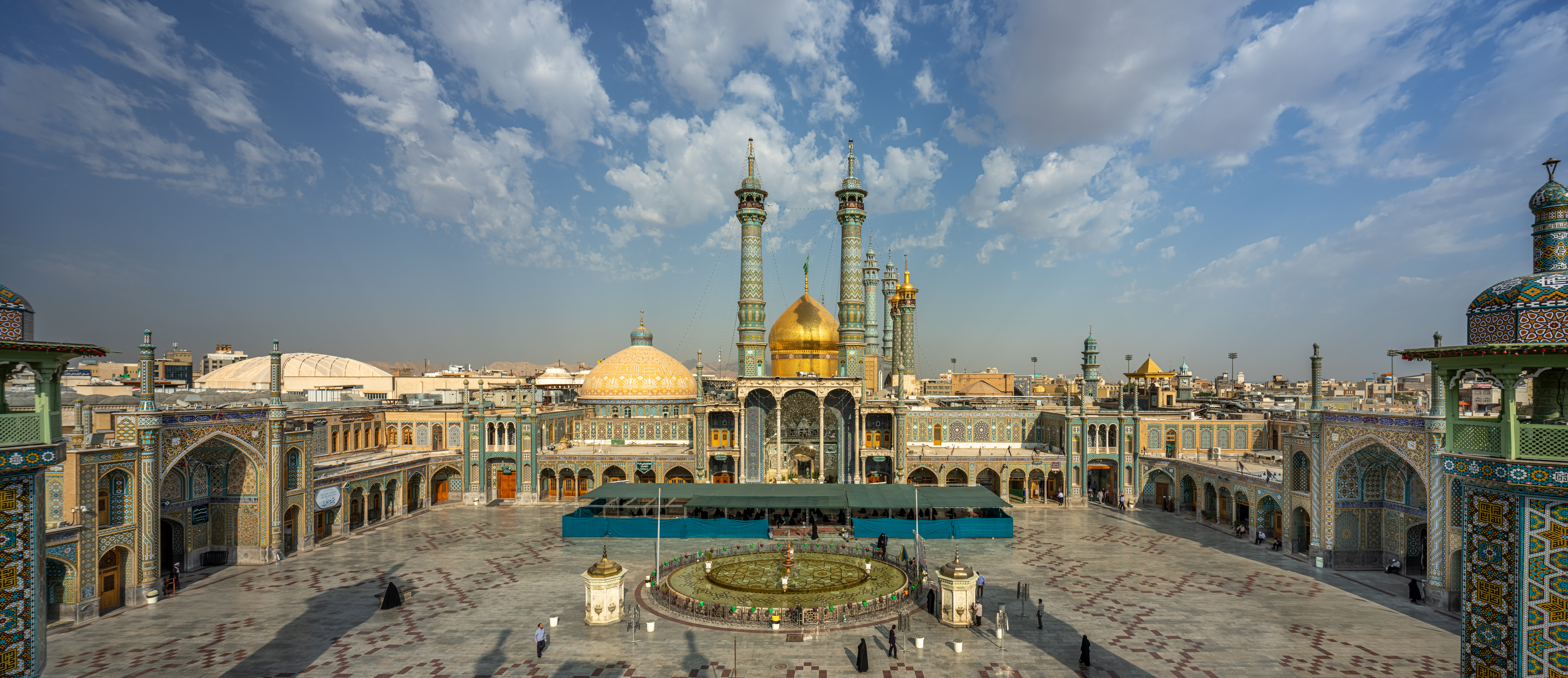

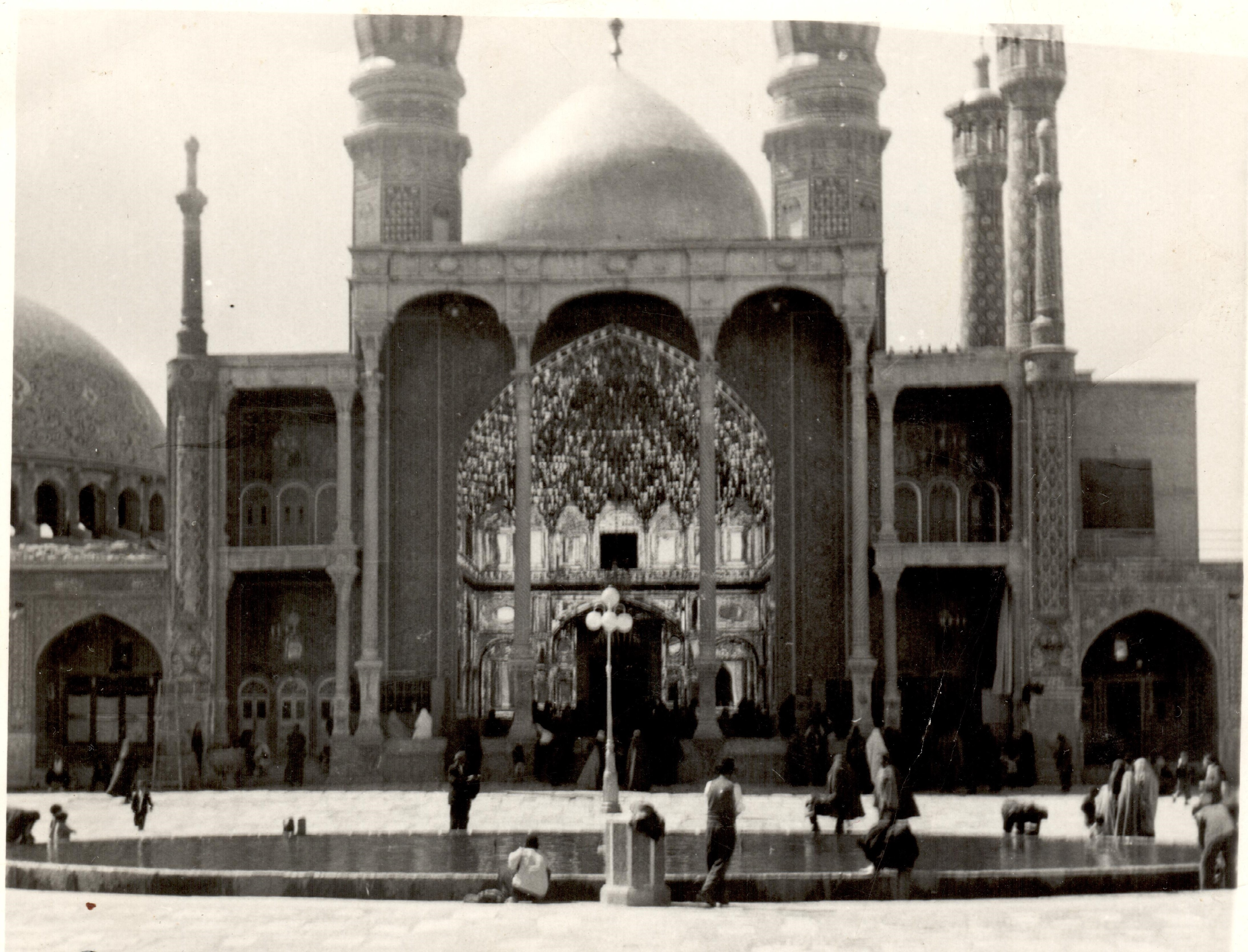
The shrine in 1955

== See also ==
- Fatima
- Holiest sites in Shia Islam
