= Zayd ibn Musa al-Kazim =

Son of Musa al-Kazim

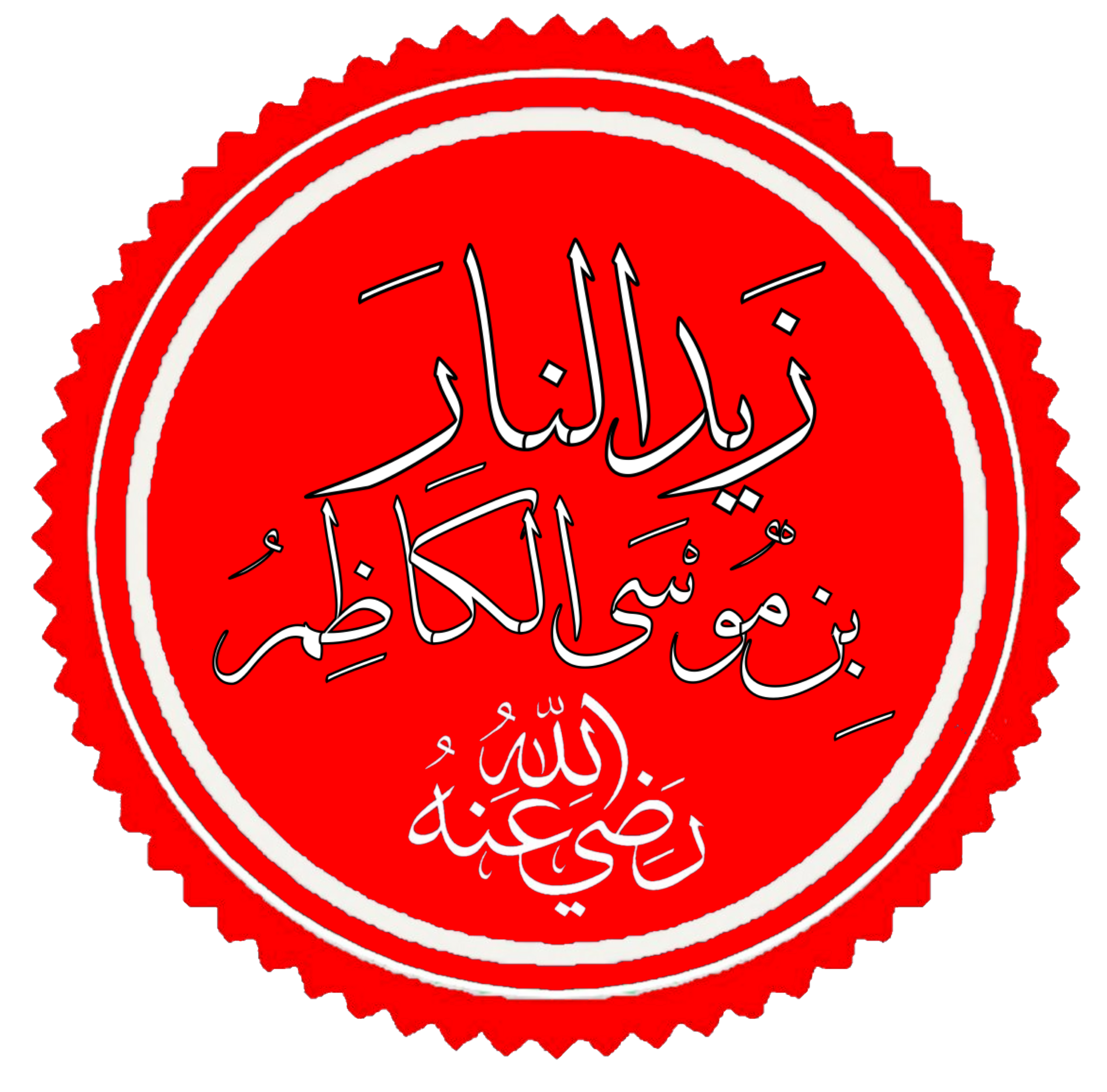
- Died: al-Iraq, Abbasid Caliphate
- Other name: Zayd al-Nar
- Criminal charges: Rebellion against State, Treason, Pogrom, Arson
- Penalty: Imprisonment

Details
- Victims: High
- Date: 815, 816

Zayd ibn Mūsā was a younger son of Musa al-Kazim and brother of Ali al-Rida, the seventh and eighth of the Twelve Imams. He is also known by the nickname Zayd al-Nar ('Zayd of the Fire'), due to the large numbers of houses belonging to Abbasids or their followers that he ordered torched. He took part in the unsuccessful Alid uprising in 815 against the Abbasid caliphate, led by Abu'l-Saraya, during which he captured and governed the city of Basra.

According to al-Tabari, his reign was characterized by a pogrom against the supporters of the Abbasids. After the defeat of Abu'l-Saraya at Kufa, Basra was captured by the Abbasid general Ibn Abi Sa'id. Zayd received a letter of safe passage from Ibn Abi Sa'id, and surrendered to him. His brother, Ibrahim ibn Musa al-Kazim, also took part in the uprising and ruled Yemen. Zayd later escaped his imprisonment and rose again in revolt at Anbar in June 816, along with Abu'l-Saraya's brother. They were soon defeated by the Abbasids and again captured.

== Sources ==
- Bosworth, C. E., ed. (1987). The History of al-Ṭabarī, Volume XXXII: The Reunification of the ʿAbbāsid Caliphate: The Caliphate of al-Maʾmūn, A.D. 813–33/A.H. 198–213. SUNY Series in Near Eastern Studies. Albany, New York: State University of New York Press. ISBN 978-0-88706-058-8.
