= Najma Khatun =

Wife of Musa al-Kazim

Najma Khatun نجمة خاتون
- Resting place: Medina, Saudi Arabia
- Spouse: Musa al-Kazim
- Children: Ali al-Rida; Fatima

Najma Khatun (Arabic: نجمة خاتون), was the wife of the seventh Imam Musa al-Kazim, and the mother of Ali al-Rida, the eighth Imam, and Fatima bint Musa (Fatima al-Ma'suma), who has been given various names in hadith and historical sources. Ali ibn Musa al-Rida's mother's original name was Tuktam, which was renamed Tahira by Musa al-Kazim after the birth of the eighth Shi'ite Imam. Najma Khatun was educated and trained by Hamida before marrying Musa al-Kazim (the seventh Shi'ite Imam). She then married Musa al-Kazim.

== Other names ==
Among Najma Khatun's other names are as follows:

- Najma, Tuktam, Samana, Sakan al-Nubiyya, Sakan, Arwa, and Tahira.

Also, among her titles are as follows:

- Saqr, Shaqra' al-Nubiyya, and Khayzuran al-Marsiyya.

== Origin ==
Tuktam was from a noble family who was kidnapped by invaders and plunderers from the Murcia region in southeastern Spain today and brought to Medina by Berber slave traders.

== Hadith ==
According to a hadith from Ali ibn Musa al-Rida, it is reported that during her pregnancy, Najma Khatun experienced no discomfort from the burden of carrying her child; While she slept, she could hear her child's voice in praise, to the extent that it would awaken her from her slumber.

== Children ==
The Children attributed to Najma include:

- Ali al-Rida.
- Fatima al-Ma'suma.

== Burial place ==
As stated by Muhammad Baqir al-Husayni al-Jalali, Najma Khatun's grave is situated adjacent to the grave of Hamida, the spouse of Ja'far al-Sadiq, in Mashraba Umm Ibrahim, located in the Al-Awali region of Medina, to the east of the Baqi' Cemetery.

== Biography book ==
The books "The Lady of Andalusia" by Sayyid Muhammad Sadiq al-Misbah al-Musawi; and "Najme Khatun, Mother of Fatima Masoumeh" by Hamid Ahmadi Jolfaei describe the life of Najma Khatun.
