= Abu'l-Saraya =

9th-century rebel of Abbasid government

Abu'l-Sarāyā al-Sarī ibn Manṣūr al-Shaybānī (d. 18 October 815) was leader of a Zaydi revolt against the Abbasid Caliphate in Kufa and Iraq in 815. The revolt spread quickly across southern Iraq, and his agents even took over Mecca and Medina. At one point, the rebels threatened even Baghdad, but the Abbasid general Harthama ibn A'yan drove them back to Kufa in a series of victories. Forced to abandon Kufa in late August, Abu'l-Saraya and his followers tried to flee, but were pursued, defeated, and captured. Abu'l-Saraya himself was executed at Baghdad on 18 October. The uprising continued in the Hejaz for a few months under Muhammad ibn Ja'far al-Sadiq as anti-caliph at Mecca, until this too was suppressed by the Abbasid troops.

== Life ==
Abu'l-Saraya's early life is obscure. His hometown was Ras al-Ayn, and claimed descent from the pre-Islamic Shabani chieftain Hani ibn Qabisa, but is said to have been a donkey driver and a bandit, before he entered the service of Yazid ibn Mazyad al-Shaybani, the Abbasid governor of Armenia. Under Yazid's command, he fought against the Khurramites. In the Abbasid civil war of al-Amin and al-Ma'mun, he initially sided with the former, and fought against al-Ma'mun's general Harthama ibn A'yan, before switching sides.

=== Revolt in Kufa ===
After a while, he obtained leave to go to the Hajj, but on the way rose on revolt. He defeated the Abbasid troops sent against him, and with the Alid Ibn Tabataba launched a Zaydi-inspired uprising in Kufa in January 815. Ibn Tabataba's role in the revolt was only as a figurehead, while actual power rested with Abu'l-Saraya. Indeed, modern scholars suggest that Abu'l-Saraya was not motivated by pro-Alid zeal, but merely saw the Alids as a tool to gain power.

The uprising was initially successful, and on 14 February 815, the rebels defeated the Abbasid troops under Zuhayr ibn al-Musayyab, that al-Ma'mun's governor of Iraq, al-Hasan ibn Sahl, had sent against them. On the next day, Ibn Tabataba died—poisoned by Abu'l-Saraya, according to al-Tabari, although this is likely a fabrication—and Muhammad ibn Muhammad ibn Zayd was made imam in his stead.

=== Spread of the uprising ===
The Abbasid commander, Zuhayr ibn al-Musayyab, withdrew to Qasr Ibn Hubayra, but at the same time, another Abbasid army of 4,000 cavalry under Abdus ibn Muhammad was sent against Kufa by al-Hasan ibn Sahl. On 3 March, Abu'l-Saraya defeated Abdus, who fell in battle. His men were either killed or taken prisoner. On the news of this, Ibn al-Musayyab withdrew further north, to Nahr al-Malik, while Abu'l-Saraya led his own troops to Qasr Ibn Hubayra.

Following his victory, Abu'l-Saraya minted dirhams with the inscription "God loves those who fight in His way in ranks, as though they were a building well-compacted", and sent his followers to occupy Wasit, Basra, and Ahwaz. At Wasit, Abu'l-Saraya's men scored another victory against the local governor, Abdallah ibn Sa'id al-Harashi, who had to retreat to Baghdad with heavy losses.

Abu'l-Saraya also sent other Alids as his agents to take over Mecca and Medina. Muhammad ibn Sulayman ibn Dawud ibn al-Hasan al-Muthanna, who was sent to Medina, was successful and took the city without opposition. Husayn ibn Hasan al-Aftas ibn Ali ibn Husayn Zayn al-Abidin, sent to Mecca, hesitated to enter the city due to the presence of an Abbasid garrison in the city that accompanied the annual Hajj pilgrimage. However, the Abbasid governor, Dawud ibn Isa, was also reluctant to confront the rebels and shed blood in the sacred city, even while the local garrison commander, Masrur al-Kabir, favoured confronting them. In the end, Dawud ibn Isa abandoned the city with part of the Abbasids' followers, and Masrur al-Kabir, his forces depleted and fearful of the pilgrims joining the rebels, followed within days. Husayn ibn Hasan al-Aftas and his small entourage entered the city on the Day of Arafah (21 June). From Mecca, another Alid, Ibrahim ibn Musa al-Kadhim, set out and took over rule of the Yemen for a while.

=== Defeat, capture, and death ===
The rebels now threatened Baghdad itself, forcing al-Hasan ibn Sahl to seek the assistance of Harthama, who was on his way to Khurasan. After initial reluctance, he agreed and returned to Baghdad. Learning of this, in April/May Abu'l-Saraya advanced to al-Mada'in, and even onwards to Nahr Sarsar, just south of Baghdad. There Harthama arrived with his own forces, and confronted the rebel army across the canal linking the Tigris and Euphrates rivers.

Harthama moved against the rebels on the day after Eid al-Fitr (15 May), sending his lieutenant, Ali ibn Abi Sa'id, against al-Mada'in. The Abbasid troops captured the city two days later, after a fiercely fought battle that lasted through the day and was renewed on the next day. Apprised of the fall of al-Mada'in, Abu'l-Saraya ordered the retreat from Nahr Sarsar to Qasr Ibn Hubayra on the night of 7/8 June. Harthama pursued him and defeated him at Qasr Ibn Hubayra, forcing the rebels to fall back to Kufa. Back in the city, Abu'l-Saraya and his men ransacked the houses of the local members of the Abbasid clan and expelled their followers from the city. Harthama defeated Abu'l-Saraya's forces at Qaryat Shahi outside Kufa, while Ali ibn Abi Sa'id, recaptured Wasit and moved against Basra.

Bereft of local support, Abu'l-Saraya and his followers had to abandon Kufa on the night of 26/27 August 815. With 800 followers on horse, Abu'l-Saraya made for Susa. There he was defeated by the local governor of Khuzistan, al-Hasan ibn Ali al-Ma'muni.

Wounded, Abu'l-Saraya and a handful of his remaining followers tried to make for Ras al-Ayn, but they were captured at Jalula and handed over to al-Hasan ibn Sahl. He was executed by decapitation at Baghdad on 18 October 815, and his body hung on public display at the bridge over the Tigris River.

=== Endgame of the revolt in Basra and Mecca ===
Basra, the last bastion of the Alid revolt in Iraq, was captured by Ali ibn Abi Sa'id, ending the reign of terror its Alid governor, Zayd ibn Musa al-Kadhim, had unleashed on the supporters of the Abbasids there.

In Mecca, the Alid regime survived for several months. After news of Abu'l-Saraya's fate reached the city, Husayn ibn Hasan al-Aftas and his confederates acclaimed the widely respected Muhammad ibn Ja'far al-Sadiq as caliph on 13 November 815. He ruled in Mecca until January 16, when his forces were defeated by the Abbasid general Ishaq ibn Musa ibn Isa. Muhammad and his remaining followers withdrew to the shores of the Red Sea and for a few months clashed with the Abbasid troops, until they surrendered against a promise of pardon in July 816.

== Sources ==
- Bosworth, C. E., ed. (1987). The History of al-Ṭabarī, Volume XXXII: The Reunification of the ʿAbbāsid Caliphate: The Caliphate of al-Maʾmūn, A.D. 813–33/A.H. 198–213. SUNY Series in Near Eastern Studies. Albany, New York: State University of New York Press. ISBN 978-0-88706-058-8.
- Gibb, H. A. R. (1960). "Abu 'l-Sarāyā al-Sarī b. Manṣūr al-S̲h̲aybānī". In Gibb, H. A. R.; Kramers, J. H.; Lévi-Provençal, E.; Schacht, J.; Lewis, B. & Pellat, Ch. (eds.). The Encyclopaedia of Islam, Second Edition. Volume I: A–B. Leiden: E. J. Brill. pp. 149–150. doi:10.1163/1573-3912_islam_SIM_0249. OCLC 495469456.
