= Muhammad al-Dibaj ibn Ja'far =

9th-century self-declared Caliph of the Muslims

Muhammad ibn Ja'far al-Sadiq (Arabic: محمد بن جعفر الصادق, romanized: Muḥammad ibn Jaʿfar al-Ṣādiq), surnamed al-Dībāj (Arabic: الديباج, lit. 'the handsome'), was a son of the sixth of the Twelve Imams, Ja'far al-Sadiq, who led a failed revolt against the Abbasid Caliphate in 815.

== Life ==
Muhammad was the fourth and youngest son of Ja'far al-Sadiq. After the death of al-Sadiq without a clearly designated successor in 765, his followers split their allegiance, giving rise to several groups. Some held that al-Sadiq would return as the Mahdi, while others followed al-Sadiq's sons, Abdallah al-Aftah, Musa al-Kazim, and Muhammad al-Dibaj. Musa al-Kazim, regarded as the seventh Imam in Twelver Shi'ism, quickly gained the following of the majority of his father's followers, especially after al-Aftah died merely seventy days after their father. Al-Dibaj's followers became known as the Shumaytiyya or Sumaytiyya sect, after their leader, Yaya ibn Abi Shumayt or Sumayt.

Al-Dibaj's doctrines are unclear, but in at least one source he appears to espouse a Zaydi-style imamate. He thus led a revolt in Mecca in 815 against the Abbasid caliph al-Ma'mun, taking on the caliphal title of commander of the faithful, and receiving the allegiance from the people of Medina. In the end, he was defeated and taken prisoner. Al-Ma'mun treated him well, and made him part of his court in Khurasan. Al-Dibaj died soon after, in 818, and was buried near Bastam, Iran. The Abbasid caliph Al-Ma'mun himself was present until the burial was over and said the final prayer on the bier.

== Descendants ==
=== Isma'il & Ja'far ===
They were present at the cemetery, attending to the funeral and burial ceremonies of their father.

=== Yahya ===
According to al-Ma'mun, Yahya was somewhere in Egypt at the time of his father's death. It is possible he was opposed to the Abbasid caliphate.

=== Ali ===
Known as al-Harisi. He had settled permanently in Shiraz since the exile of his father's family from Medina. Seven generations of his descendants lived and multiplied in Shiraz and some are known to have accompanied armies of Mughal Emperor Humayun to India.

=== Al-Qasim ===
Al-Dibaj had a son named Al-Qasim, who in turn had three children: Umm Kulthum (d.868), Abdallah (d.875) and Yahya (d.877). Al-Qasim and his family went to live in Egypt after the failure of al-Dibaj's revolt and were among the first Alid families to resettle in Egypt. In the 12th century, during the rule of the Fatimid Caliphate, shrines to their memory were erected: the Mashhad of al-Qasim Abu Tayyib and the Mashhad of Yahya al-Shabih.

== Legacy and Tomb ==
Al-Dibaj's followers, the Shumaytiyya or Sumaytiyya, believed that the Imamate would remain with his family and that the Mahdi would come from among his family.

Muhammad al-Dibaj was buried in Jurjan, Iran (near Bastam, Iran) and his grave soon became a site of pilgrimage and known as "qabr al-da'i" (Grave of the Da'i/Missionary). In 900 CE, Muhammad ibn Zayd, the Zaydi ruler of Tabaristan, was killed in battle by the Sunni Samanids and subsequently beheaded. His head was sent to the Samanid court located in Bukhara while his "headless torso (badan)" was sent to Jurjan to be buried in Muhammad al-Dibaj's burial site. According to the historian Al-Qummi, in 984 AD, a "a proper structure (turba) [on the burial site of Dibaj and Muhammad ibn Zayd's body] was erected only on the orders of the Buyid wazīr al-Ṣāḥib".

== See also ==
- Fourth Fitna
- Descendants of Ali ibn Abi Talib

== Sources ==
- Bosworth, C. E., ed. (1987). The History of al-Ṭabarī, Volume XXXII: The Reunification of the ʿAbbāsid Caliphate: The Caliphate of al-Maʾmūn, A.D. 813–33/A.H. 198–213. SUNY Series in Near Eastern Studies. Albany, New York: State University of New York Press. ISBN 978-0-88706-058-8.
- Al-Maqalat wa al-Firaq, by Sa'ad Ibn Abdillah al-Ash'ari al-Qummi (d. 301), pg.80
- Daftary, Farhad (2007). The Ismāʿı̄lı̄s: Their History and Doctrines (Second ed.). Cambridge: Cambridge University Press. ISBN 978-0-521-61636-2.
- Momen, M. (1985). An Introduction to Shi'i Islam. Yale University Press. ISBN 9780300035315.
- Williams, Caroline (1985). "The Cult of ʿAlid Saints in the Fatimid Monuments of Cairo, Part II: The Mausolea". Muqarnas. 3: 39–60. doi:10.2307/1523083. JSTOR 1523083.
