= Usul Fiqh in Ja'fari school =

Islamic jurisprudence in Shi'a Islam

Ja'fari principles (Persian: علم اصول در مکتب جعفری) refers to regulations, history and eminent persons and scholars during the development of Shia's Principles of Islamic jurisprudence.

== History and development ==
=== Imami jurists and early works ===
Considering different stances in relation to Juridical rules and principles, there are some parties in the schools of Principles. These schools try to apply analytical approaches in their methodology. There are somebodies such as Zorarah Ibn Aayon, Muhammad Ibn Moslem, Abu Basir and also Hisham Ibn Salem. Among these individuals, Hisham Ibn Salem and His Pupils had eminent roles in development of principles among Shia. In this period two problems are so important such as difference of hadith in one hand and the distinctions of Ijtihad or authority in other hand. There are two early scholars in principles of jurisprudence who were eminent including Hisham ibn Hakam and Yunes Ibn Abd Al Rahman. Some scholars know Hisham ibn hakam and Hisham ibn Salem among the outstanding pupils of Imam Sadiq and Imam Kazim. they wrote important books in the field of principles of jurisprudence such as "Kitab Al Akhbar" and " Kayfa Taseh" or "How it is correct?"

=== Period of establishment ===
It seems that the dominant current was the Adherents of Hadith during the fourth century of Lunar hijrah. They didn't any need to knowledge of principles and put it away. On the other hand, the relatives of Nobakhti begun a new movement in the sphere of theology and kalam among Shia and Imamiyyah. Abu Sahl Nobakhti, the popular theologian of Shia schools, could present a new and complete theological system along with Shia characters. In fact, Abu Sahl Nobakhti concerned with the principles through the theological works such a way that he referred to some questions in the field of the principles. According to Madlung this approach of Abu Sahl Nobakhti and his theological system was along with defending of Imami creeds and theological beliefs. Maybe the most important Abu Sahl's essay in the principles is the essay of "Naqz Al Shafe'ei or the refusing the shafe'ei which is written against Shafe'ei and also counted as the first completed work in the principles among imamiyyah. Besides he wrote some books on the subjects of refusing Qyias in jurisprudence and ijtihad Al R'ay. Of course, there is no track from these works and they are lost. During the fourth century of Hijrah, already one trend is very dominant which is indeed on the basis of refusing of Qiyas and R'ay in jurisprudence. Also, there were many books concerned with these subjects among imami theologians. For example, Hasan ibn Mousa Nobakhti wrote a book by the name of "A book on the khabar Vahed and Amal". According to this work, there is no application for Qiyas and R'ay. Among the first Mutakalim Jurists in the fourth century is Ibn Abi Aqil Ammani as someone who possessed a school which his method was similar to Twelve Imams of Shia and somehow like the Mutazilite schools of thought.

==== Ibn Abi Aqil And his thought ====
His complete name was Ibn Abi Aqil Ammani, and he came from the Yemen. He was contemporary with Shaykh Koleini. Ibn Aqil counted as pioneer jurist in the principles. He could establish an approach on which his juridical methodology was dependent on Quranic rules and known traditions. He is the author of a legal work entitled Mutamassak bi Habl Al Rasul, which was one of the most renowned legal sources during the 4th and 5thllOth and 11th centuries. He is the first one who arrange the knowledge of fiqh and give consistency to it.

==== Ibn Jonayd Eskafi ====
Ibn Jonayd Eskafi was one of the first and eminent Shia jurists during the fourth century lunar hijrah. He had different approach in understanding of Shia's traditions. He believed that there is a theological basis for interpretation of Hadith on which the Juridical tradition of Imams is not according to Saying but to Ray or opinion. He was an eminent religious scholar among elites. Also, Ibn Nadim knows him as great scholars among shia. One of his most important books in Fiqh is Tahzib Al Shia le Ahkam Al Shariah.

=== Period of development ===
During this phase, Shia scholars further developed usul al-fiqh, in response to new questions which arose following the beginning of the Major Occultation. Scholars who contributed to this development included Shaykh Mufid, Sharif Murtaza, Sallar Deylami and Shaykh Tusi.

==== Shaykh Mufid ====
He was also called Ibn Muallim, meaning "son of the teacher"; Muallim was his father. Among his teachers were the Shia theologian Abu Ali al-Iskafi, Abu Abdallah al-Marzubani, Abu Abdallah al-Basri, Abu al-Hassan, and Ali ibn Isa al-Rummani. Commonly known as the leader of the Shia, Al-Mufid is regarded as the most famous scholar of the Buyid period and an eminent jurist, mainly due to his contributions in the field of kalam. According to Ibn al-Nadim, who knew al-Mufid personally, he was the head of the Shia Mutekallimun in the field of kalam, and al-Tawhidi, who was also personally familiar with al-Mufid, described him as "eloquent and skillful at dialectic (jadal)". His skill in polemical debate was such that he was said to be capable of convincing his opponents "that a wooden column was actually gold". He was taught the Islamic science of hadith by Al-Shaykh al-Saduq.

==== Sharif Murtaza ====
He was born in Baghdad in 355 Lunar in Rajab Month. He was born in a prominent household. His lineage comes back to Imam kazim he was son of Al Sharif Abu Ahmad the son of Mosa son of Muhammad son of Musa son of Ibrahim son of Musa Kazim Therefore, his sixth ancestor was the seventh imam of Shia. His father called him Ali and his nickname was Murtaza. His honorific title was Alam Al Hoda. He called as Alam al Hoda according to a popular narration said by Shahid Avval in the book of Arbaeen as follow: the vizir of Abbasid dynasty namely Muhammad ibn Hosein became sick. He saw in his dreams Imam Ali while address him: tell alam Al Hoda till demand Health for you. When Muhammad ibn Hosein ask on the person with such a nickname he told: he is ali ibn Hosein or sharif Murtaza. According to Murtaza, the first of religious duty is the obligation to reason to knowledge of God. The other duties are dependent to this first duty. Al-Murtaza is along with the Mu'tazilite starting-point that man's first duty is to use his reason to arrive at knowledge of God. Also in Kalam proof of the existence of God, he defends from the atomist' stance in versus of Aristotelian notion of substantial change.

==== Shaykh Tusi ====
He was born in Tus in Iran in 995 AD/385. In 1018 AD/408 A.H. His life was along with the government of Buyid dynasty. He was born according to praying of twelfth imam of shia namely Mahdi He learned significant level of Islamic sciences of that period in Tus in Khorasan. he left Tus to study in Baghdad. In 1055 AD/447 A.H Tughril-bek entered Baghdad. there he could participate in the courses of Shykh Al-Mufid as paramount teacher. Also he wrote some of his books when he was between twenty and thirty. When he was forty-two, he participated in the class of his master namely Shaykh Murtaza. At this time many Muslim scholars in Baghdad, both Sunni and Shiʿite were killed. The house of al-Shaikh al-Tusi was burnt down, as were his books and the works he had written in Baghdad, together with important libraries of Shi'ite books. Al-Tusi went to al-Najaf after the fall of Baghdad. He died at Najaf on the 22nd of Muharram in the year 460 A.H/2 December 1067.in confliction between two schools of Ahbaris and usuli, Shaykh Tusi defended of Usuli school and calls akhbari as followers of literate or literalists. Shaykh Tusi believed in principles of jurisprudence as a fundamental knowledge in acquiring the judgments of Islam religion. he wrote in introduction of 'Al-Iddah' book as follow: " thus you may say, it is essential to attach the greatest importance to this branch of knowledge( namely Usul) because the whole of shariah is based on it and the knowledge of any aspect thereof is not complete without mastering the principles. Also he tries to compare different schools of law in Islam with each other and show there is a little divergence between them and they are near to each other and differences among them is in minor subject not major. Shaykh Tusi, like his Masters, refuted the legal analogy(Qiyyas Fiqhi) in his manual of usul Fiqh.

=== Period of flourishing ===
This period begins from the end of sixth into middle of eighth lunar hijrah. Scholars have written many detailed books in the field of principles. They concerned with principles in detail and accuracy. Scholars such as Ibn Zohreh halabi, Sadid Al Din Hemsi, Najm Al Din Helli, Allameh Helli, Amid Al Din A'araji, Zia Al Din A'araji, Fakhr Al Mohaqeqin, Muhammad Ibn Makki known as first martyr, Shaykh Abdullah Soyouri, Zain Al DIn Ibn Nour Al Din Ali Ibn Ahmad known A Second Martyr, all of them lived in this period.

==== Ibn Zohreh Halabi ====
His whole name is Ezz Al Din A l Makarem Sayyed Hamzeh Ibn Ali Ibn Zohreh. According To Moreza Mutahhari he learned Tusi's Nihayah under Ibn Hajib. nearly 20th book attributed to him. Diversity of them shows his all around. His eminent book in principle is Qanyat Al Nozu fi Elmi Al Usul Va foru.

==== Allameh Helli ====
Al-Hilli also known as the sage of Hilla, was born in the still existent town of Al Hillah (in what is now Iraq), commonly viewed as the centre of Shia Islam when Sunni leaders were in control over Baghdad during his life. He entered into a prominent family of Shia jurists and theologians. His father, Sadid ul-Din al-Hilli, was a respected mujtahid and a leading figure in the Shia community. His maternal uncle Muhaqqiq al-Hilli was also a renowned scholar.He studied theology and fiqh (Islamic jurisprudence) in Hilla under the auspices of his father and his uncle, as well as other notable scholars, including: Ali bin Tawus and Ahmad bin Tawus. He also spent some time at the newly established Maragheh observatory, where he studied Avicennan philosophy and mathematics under Nasir al-Din al-Tusi, and was also introduced to the works of Fakhr al-Din al-Razi. Later, he travelled to Baghdad and became acquainted with the doctrines of Ibn Arabi. Al-Hilli's role in shaping Twelver jurisprudence is of great importance. As well as several works and commentaries on usul al-fiqh, he produced a voluminous legal corpus. Of this, two of the most important works are al-Mukhtalaf (The Disagreement) and al-Muntaha (The End). Mukhtalaf is a legal manual devoted to addressing legal questions in which the Shia jurists hold differing opinions, whereas the Muntaha is a systematic and detailed exposition of al-Hilli's own legal opinions. He also wrote a summarized legal manual, Qawa'id ul-Ahkam, which was popular amongst later scholars, judging by the number of commentaries that would be written on it. Amongst his later legal works is Tadhkirat ul-Fuqaha, which is a legal manual intended for use by lay persons. He also composed legal works on specific issues (for example, Hajj or Salat).

==== Fakhr Al Muhaqeqin ====
Muhaqqiq was born in the city of al-Hilla, Iraq, where he would spend most of his life, to a family of prominent Shi'i jurists. He studied theology, fiqh and usul al-fiqh under his father. Muhaqqiq later became the leader of the Shi'i seminary there. He has many credible books in principles like Mabadi Al Osul, Fakhryyah and others.

==== First martyr ====
Muhammad Jamaluddin al-Makki al-Amili al-Jizzini (1334–1385) also known as Shahid Awwal (Arabic: الشهيد الأولash-Shahid al-Awwal "The First Martyr"), is the author of Al-Lum'ah ad-Dimashqiya (Arabic: الدمشقية اللمعة, The Damascene Glitter") and was a Shi'a scholar. Although he is neither the first Muslim, nor the first Shi'te to die for his religion, he became known as "Shahid Awwal" because he was probably the first Shia scholar of such stature to have been killed in a brutal manner.When Mohammad bin Makki was 16 years old he went to study at al-Hilla in Iraq. He returned home when he was 21. He used taqiyya to establish himself as one of the religious scholars of Damascus, using Sunni law to judge Sunnis, while covertly judging the Shia using Shia law.

==== Second martyr ====
Zayn al-Din al-Juba'i al'Amili (1506-1558) was a Shia scholar. He was born in 911 AH. in Jabal Amel.His Magnum opus is the first commentary of The Damascene Glitter by Shahid Awwal called The Beautiful Garden in Interpreting the Damscene Glitter (Arabic: ar-Rawda-l-Bahiyah fi Sharh allam'a-d-Dimashqiya الروضة البهيّة في شرح اللمعة الدمشقيّة ).

=== Period of Decline ===
The appearance of Akhbari lies in this period. This school "crystalized" as a distinct movement with the writings of Muhammad Amin al-Astarabadi (d. 1627 AD) and achieved its greatest influence in the late Safavid and early post-Safavid era. However, shortly thereafter Muhammad Baqir Behbahani (d. 1792), along with other Usuli mujtahids, crushed the Akhbari movement. Akhbārī ideology is that nothing but the aḥadīth of the Infallible can serve as authoritative evidence in Islam. Akhbārīs also differ from Usūlīs in their rejection of the Guardianship of the Islamic Jurists, arguing that preachers of religion have no role in politics, clerics should advise political leaders but not govern themselves. Akhbaris believe in separation of religion and state in absence of Twelfth Imam, they say that only an infallible ruling Imam has a right to combine religion and state; and which will be accomplished only after the arrival of awaited Shia Imam.

==== Against akhbarism ====
- According to the Akhbari view, the only sources of law are the Quran and the Hadith, and any case not explicitly covered by one of these must be regarded as not having been provided for.
- According to the majority Usuli view, it is legitimate to seek general principles by induction, in order to provide for cases not expressly provided for. This process is known as ijtihad, and the intellect is recognised as a source of law. It differs from the Sunni qiyas in that it does not simply extend existing laws on a test of factual resemblance: it is necessary to formulate a general principle that can be rationally supported.

== Contemporary periods ==
Javadi Amoli wrote about source of revelation in Shiism:

1. The most important source in Shiite law is the Quran itself, which interprets itself
2. The other source is the tradition of the infallibles (the family of Muhammad), according to the successive tradition (Saqalain) passed down by the family of Muhammad as well as according to the Quran itself: to accept one without the other is equivalent to rejecting both of them.
3. A third source is theoretical wisdom where it is impossible to conceive the contrary, which proves the existence of God and the necessity of his unity, eternity, pre-existence, power, will and other exalted attributes: this cannot be denied with any verse.
4. Although we cannot impose science upon the Quran, we can use verified scientific, experimental, historical, artistic, logical and other evidence to interpret the subject addressed in a given passage, rather than through another verse.

In doubtful cases the law is often derived not from substantive principles induced from existing rules, but from procedural presumptions (usul 'amaliyyah) concerning factual probability. An example is the presumption of continuity: if one knows that a given state of affairs, such as ritual purity, existed at some point in the past but one has no evidence one way or the other whether it exists now, one can presume that the situation has not changed.

The analysis of probability forms a large part of the Shiite science of usul al-fiqh, and was developed by Muhammad Baqir Behbahani (1706-1792) and Shaykh Murtada al-Ansari (died 1864). The only primary text on Shi'ite principles of jurisprudence in English is Muhammad Baqir as-Sadr's Durus fi 'Ilm al-'Usul.

== English version ==
Uşūl al-Fiqh, the methodology of jurisprudence, which is usually – and inaccurately, if not incorrectly – translated “principles of jurisprudence,” is an Islamic science which is developed by Shiite scholars in two recent centuries into an unparalleled intellectual, logical system of thought and a comprehensive branch of knowledge which not only serves as the logic of jurisprudence but as an independent science dealing with some hermeneutical problems.

Lack of precise English equivalents to expressions and terms of this complicated science indicates the least difficulties of preparing the first English version of Shiite uşūl al-fiqh.

"An Introduction to Methodology of Islamic Jurisprudence (Uşūl al-Fiqh)-A Shiite Approach" is the first English version of Shiite uşūl al-fiqh.

This book is written by Alireza Hodaee, Professor of Jurisprudence and the Essentials of Islamic Law, University of Tehran.

Most of the complicated arguments of such profound science cannot be presented in an introductory work; they should be pursued in detailed books written by great Shiite Uşūlīs.

== See also ==
- Hisham ibn Hakam
- Usuli
- Fiqh
