= Muhsini Dilemma =

Scholarly debate in Twelver Shia hadith studies

The transmission problem in Twelver Shia rijāl scholarship (also referred to as the Mohseni dilemma, Arabic: إشكالية المحسني, Ishkāliyyat al-Muḥsinī) addresses the epistemological foundations of transmitter evaluations in the Twelver Shia tradition of ʿilm al-rijāl (علم الرجال).

The core debate focuses on verifying the reliability assessments found in classical Shia biographical works, particularly because of the significant chronological gaps between the compilers and the original transmitters. Pre-modern and modern scholars, notably Abu al-Qasim al-Khoei and Muhammad Asif Mohseni, have heavily debated this aspect of hadith authentication.

== Background ==
=== ʿIlm al-Rijāl ===
ʿIlm al-rijāl (علم الرجال, lit. "the science of men") is a discipline within the Islamic hadith sciences that evaluates the reliability of narrators in the chains of transmission (isnād, إسناد) of hadith. Scholars specializing in this field issue judgments such as tawthīq (توثيق, accreditation) and tadʿīf (تضعيف, weakening), which dictate the acceptance or rejection of transmitted reports.

In Twelver Shia hadith methodology, the reliability of a report hinges on the assessed reliability of each individual in its chain. Biographical evaluations are either explicit (al-tawthīqāt al-khāṣṣa) or inferred through broader criteria (al-tawthīqāt al-ʿāmma).

=== Primary biographical works ===
The classical Twelver Shia rijāl tradition relies on four major texts:

- Rijāl al-Najāshī by Ahmad ibn Ali al-Najashi
- Rijāl al-Ṭūsī and al-Fihrist by Muhammad ibn al-Hasan al-Tusi
- Ikhtiyār Maʿrifat al-Rijāl, an abridgement of the work of al-Kashshi
- Works attributed to Ibn al-Ghadairi, whose attribution remains disputed

== The transmission problem ==
Later biographers, prominently al-Najashi and al-Tusi, rarely identified the intermediary sources used to evaluate earlier transmitters. Consequently, scholars debate whether the transmission chains for these biographical judgments can actually be reconstructed or independently verified. Because rijāl evaluations dictate hadith authentication, this gap significantly impacts Twelver Shia methodology.

== Historical responses ==
=== Pre-modern scholarship ===
Al-Allama al-Hilli and Ibn Dawud al-Hilli formalized earlier biographical data and established specific criteria for evaluating transmitters. They relied heavily on existing compilations rather than scrutinizing the transmission chains of the sources themselves.

Later, during the 11th/17th-century Akhbari–Usuli dispute, Muhammad Amin al-Astarabadi dismissed the necessity of rijāl-based evaluation entirely. Conversely, Usuli scholars like Muhammad Baqir Behbahani actively defended and broadened the methodology.

=== Al-Khoei's approach ===
Abu al-Qasim al-Khoei maintained that evaluations within classical rijāl texts originated from earlier authorities and should be trusted based on the compiler's own established reliability. While dominant in contemporary Twelver Shia scholarship, this framework continues to attract criticism.

=== Mohseni's critique ===
In Buḥūth fī ʿIlm al-Rijāl, Muhammad Asif Mohseni (1935–2019) challenged the verifiability of biographical evaluations lacking explicit intermediary sources, framing the chronological gap as a severe methodological flaw:

The problem is that their endorsements and condemnations of a transmitter... come with a gap in time... and they do not list the intermediaries between them [and that period] for us to analyze...

— Mohseni 2010, p. 58

== Manifestations of the Dilemma ==
The documentary gaps in primary biographical works created persistent methodological challenges regarding major transmitters.

=== Ibrahim ibn Hashim al-Qummi ===
Ibrahim ibn Hashim al-Qummi, a pivotal figure credited with introducing Kufan hadith traditions to Qum. Despite his presence in thousands of transmission chains, neither al-Najashi nor al-Tusi explicitly documented his reliability (tawthīq khāṣṣ) in their primary compilations. His son, Ali ibn Ibrahim al-Qummi, relied heavily on his narrations in his controversial Tafsir.

=== Ahmad ibn Muhammad ibn Yahya al-Attar ===
Ahmad ibn Muhammad ibn Yahya al-Attar was a key master of transmission (Shaykh al-Ijaza) who taught the prominent compiler Shaykh al-Saduq. However, early biographical texts lack any explicit verification of his trustworthiness. While later scholars Al-Khoei, famously classifying him as an individual of unknown status (majhūl al-hal).

== See also ==
- Hadith sciences
- Isnad
- Twelver Shia Islam
- Akhbari
- Usuli
