= Muhammad Hasan al-Najafi =

Shiite religious authority and author (1785–1850)

Grand Ayatollah Sheikh Muhammad-Hasan al-Najafi
- الشيخ محمد حسن النجفي
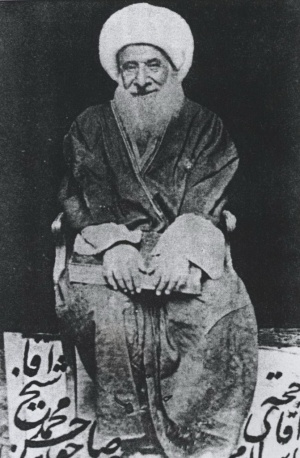

Personal life
- Born: 1785 Najaf, Ottoman Iraq
- Died: 1849 (aged 63–64) Najaf, Ottoman Iraq
- Resting place: Imam Ali Shrine
- Parent: Baqir al-Najafi (father)
- Other names: Sahib al-Jawahir, Arabic: صاحب الجواهر

Religious life
- Religion: Islam
- Denomination: Twelver Shi'a
- Jurisprudence: Ja'fari
- Creed: Usuli

Muslim leader
- Based in: Najaf, Iraq
- Successor: Murtadha al-Ansari

Grand Ayatollah Sheikh Muhammad-Hasan al-Najafi (Arabic: محمد حسن النجفي, romanized: Muḥammad Ḥasan al-Najafī; 1785–1850), also known as Sahib al-Jawahir (Arabic: صاحب الجواهر), was a prominent Shiite religious authority and author. He was most known for his books of Jawahir al-Kalam Fi Sharh Shara'i' al-Islam, a 42-volume work on fiqh.

== Birth ==
Though the exact date of Muhammad Hasan's birth is unclear, Agha Bozorg Tehrani, a renowned Shi'ite scholar from Iran, puts it at around 1212 lunar Hijri (AD 1797). His father, Shaykh Muhammad Baqir al-Najafi, along with his wife and Shaykh Muhammad Hassan's mother, were the grandchildren of Shaykh Abu Al-Hassan Al-Futuni Al-Amili, who is from Jabal Amil, Lebanon. His family lineage includes numerous religious scholars and his brother, Muhammad Hossein, who was killed as a young man. Muhammad Hasan had eight sons, and several daughters.

== Usuli movement and Najaf seminary ==
The appearance of Muhammad Hasan was the result of a development in which some important persons contributed. The Najaf seminary was the place where Akhbarism first appeared at the time when Muhammad Hasan lived in Najaf. In fact, after the establishment of the Usuli school in Shia thought, scholars such as Muhammad Baqir Behbahani, Moḥammad Mahdī Baḥr al-ʿUlūm, and Shaykh Ja'far Kashef al-Ghita developed Usulism from those foundations. When Kashef al-Ghata died, Muhammad Hasan was appointed as the chief of Najaf seminary. Many of the scholars and Ulama supported him for this position. He became very famous after his Excellency Agha Sayyed Ibrahim died. Muhammad Hasan then endorsed the injunctions of the late Ibrahim, and afterward became acquainted with the late Ibrahim's students. Shaykh Ansari was a pupil of Muhammad Hasan and he followed his teacher in managing the seminary.

It is said that the institution of the Marja' in Shi'ism was not centralized until the time of Muhammad Hasan. According to one of his students, during that time he developed the leadership of the Shia. Sayyed Muhammad Nasirabadi believes that Muhammad Hasan had an esoteric relationship with the twelfth Imam.

== Opinions ==
Muhammad Hasan tried to continue the style of thought that has been started by Allamah Hilli: introducing substantial changes in tradition, without breaking the tradition altogether.

== Works ==
- Al Risalah al-Amaliyah
- An essay on Alms and Khums
- Najat al-'Ibad fi Yaum al-Ma'ad
- Hidayat al-Nasekin
- Jawahir al-Kalam

== Pupils ==
- Mulla Zayn al-'Abidin al-Mazandarani
- Sayyid Husayn Kuhkamari'i
- Mulla Ali Kani (the author of Idah al-mushtabahat wa tawdih al-maqal)
- Muhammad Irawani
- Shaykh Ja'far al-Shushtari
- Shaykh Jawad (the author of Sharh al-lum'atayn)
- Shaykh Muhsin Khanfar
- Shaykh Muhsin A'sam (the author of Kashf al-falam)
- Sayyid Asad Allah Isfahani
- Shaykh al-'Iraqiyyin
- Shaykh Hasan al-Mamaqani
- Sayyid Husayn Bahr al-'Ulum
- Sayyid Mahmud al-Burujirdi
- Mulla Ali al-Khalili
- Sayyid Ibrahim Shari'atmadar al-Sabziwari
- Shaykh Murtaza Shushtari Ansari
