= Al-Bahrani (name) =

Al-Bahrani is an Arabic-language surname meaning the Bahraini. Notable people with the name include:

- al-Bahrani (1238–1299), Twelver Shia Islamic scholar
- Sayyid Hashim al-Bahrani, Bahraini Shia scholar
- Yusuf al-Bahrani (1695–1772), Bahraini Twelver Shia cleric
- Mahmood Al Bahrani, Bahraini politician and businessman
- Basil Al-Bahrani (born 1995), Saudi professional footballer
- Ahmed Albahrani (born 1967), Iraqi sculptor

== See also ==
- Halat al Bahrani, island in United Arab Emirates
