= Dakheel Najafi =

19th and 20th-century Islamic scholar

Dakhīl Najafi

Personal life
- Born: N/A Najaf, Ottoman Empire.
- Died: 1888 CE/1340 AH. Najaf, Ottoman Empire.

Religious life
- Religion: Islam

Sheikh Dakhil Al-Hakkāmi Al-Najafi (Arabic: دخيل النجفي) (c. 1888) was an Iraqi Shia marja, jurist, author, writer and a religious leader. He was one of the students of the prominent Shi’a cleric Murtada Ansari.

== Works ==
The different works on Islamic (Shi’ite) jurisprudence by Al-Najafi, all written in Arabic have never been translated into English or any other language. His works include:

- Anwārul Faqāha. It is a commentary on the well-known work Sharāe’ul Islam which it is written by Mohaqqiq Al-Hilli.
- Ar-Raddu ‘Ala Al Akhbāriyya. It's a reply to Akhbarism.
