= Mohsen Fayz Kashani =

Iranian philosopher (1598-1680)

- ملا محسن فیض کاشانی
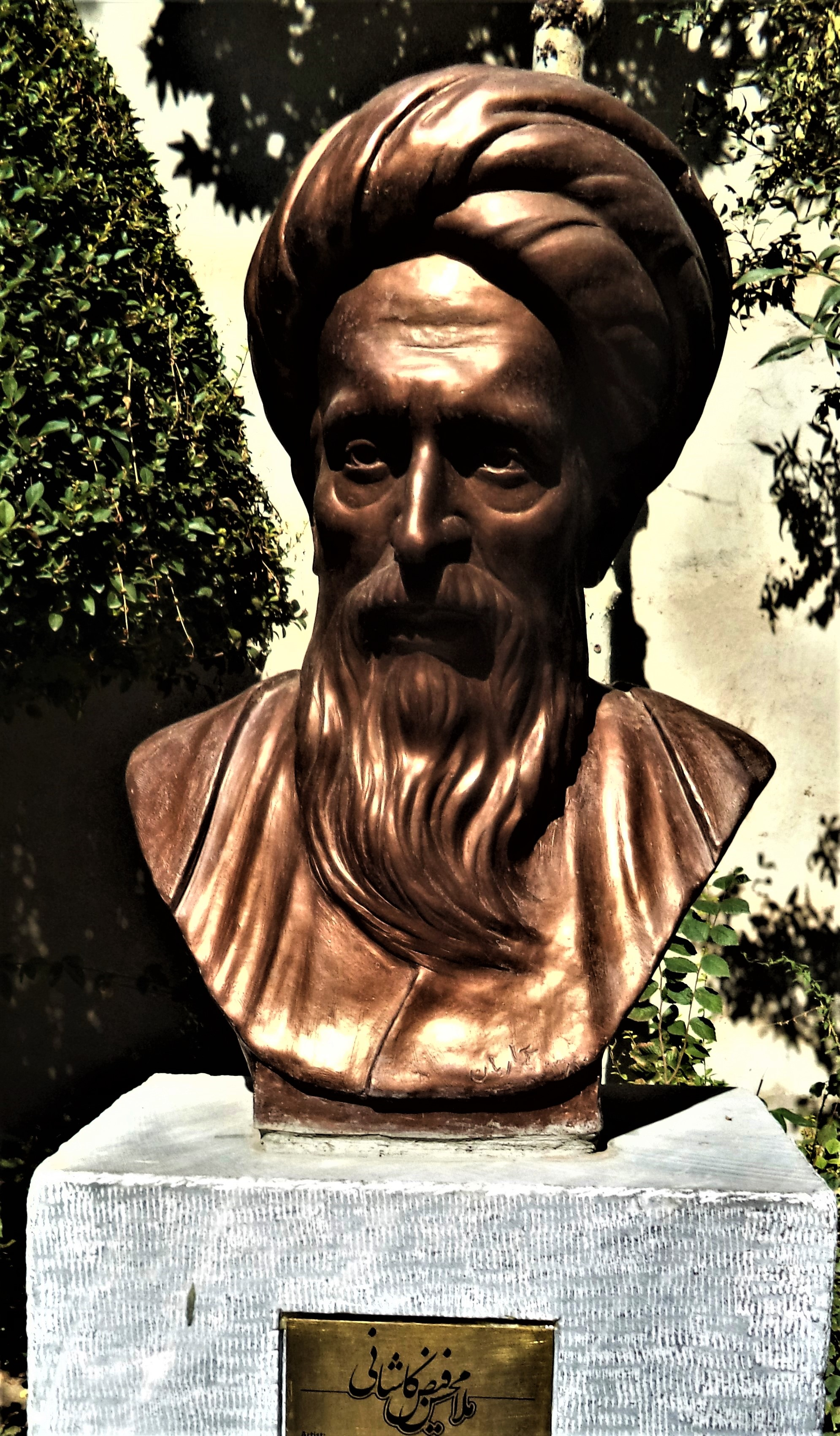
- Bust of Mohsen Fayz Kashani, in Isfahan

Personal life
- Born: 15 September 1598 Kashan, Safavid Iran
- Died: May 22, 1680 (aged 81) Kashan, Safavid Iran
- Era: Post-Classical Islamic philosophy
- Main interest(s): Islamic Philosophy, Illuminationism, Transcendent theosophy, Fiqh, Hadith, Irfan

Religious life
- Religion: Islam
- Denomination: Shia
- Jurisprudence: Jaʽfari (Akhbari)
- Creed: Twelver

Muslim leader
- Influenced by: Imam Ali, Mir Damad, Baha al-Din al-Amili, Ibn Arabi, Mulla Sadra, Muhammad Amin al-Astarabadi
- Influenced: Al-Hurr al-Amili, Mirza Husain Noori Tabarsi, Abbas Qomi, Abdul Hosein Amini

Mollā Moḥammad bin Mortezā bin Maḥmūd Kāshānī, known as Mollā Moḥsen Fayz Kāshānī (Persian: ملا محسن فیض کاشانی) was an Iranian Akhbari Twelver Shi'i Muslim, mystic, poet, philosopher, and muhaddith (1598-1680 ᴄᴇ).

== Life ==
Mohsen Fayz Kashani was born in Kashan to a Persian family renowned for its scholarly learning, Fayz started his education with his father, Shah Morteza. His father owned a rich library which benefited Fayz. When he reached the age of twenty, he travelled to Isfahan for further study. However, after a year in Isfahan, he moved to Shiraz to study Hadith and Fiq (Jurisprudence) under Majid Bahrani, one of the leading Shi'ite scholars of his time. Bahrani died a few months later, and Fayz returned to Isfahan where he joined the circles of great scholar Sheykh Bahai and studied philosophy under Mir Damad. After performing the hajj, he stayed a short time before returning to Persia.

Upon his return he found a new master, Qom Molla Sadra who taught him in different disciplines. Sadra taught him for eight years, studying ascetic exercises and learning all of the sciences. Sadra gave Fayz one of his daughters to marry, they later had a son named, Muhammad Alam al-Huda, who followed in his fathers footsteps. Fayz is said to have produced works that mixed Islamic scriptural moral concerns with Aristotelian, Platonic schemas and illuminationist mysticism- a rationalist gnostic approach. (Rizvi) Some of his works brought him bad attention, he was criticized by Unlama for not using the Idjma in questioning jurisprudence, such as the legitimacy of music and the definition of impurity. One of Fayz students later blames him for encouraging his students to listen to music. (Chittick) Fayz taught at the Molla'Ábd-Allah madrasa and led Friday prayer in Isfahan. After an unknown period of time Fayz returned to Kasan where he later died in the year 1680.

Before his death, an earthquake struck the city of Sherwan in Iran. During the same year, the town of Mashad was also victim to an earthquake of high intensity. The rule at the time had happened to be traveling through Kashan and became greatly worried over the loss of life and infrastructure that had occurred. He soon began to seek answers from among those who were claimed to be the wisest in the city. Eventually he came across Mohsen Fayz Kashani and asked for an answer. Kashani is reported to have said, "There is a spate of earthquakes because of you. You may not know, but it is proven through the traditions of the Infallibles that frequent earthquakes will come when bribery is practiced in the courts of law."

== Works ==
He was a prolific writer in both Persian and Arabic, with a bibliography of more than a hundred and twenty titles. One of his famous work is Mohjat-al-Beyza which is entirely rewritten of the Ihya' ulum al-din (Revival of Religious Sciences), the great work by al-Ghazali, from the Shia point of view. Another of his great works, 'Ayn al-yaqin, The Certitude of the Eye-witness, is a personal synthesis which complements his great commentary on the Quran.

His other works include Abwab-ol Jenan (The Doors of the Paradise), The Commentary of Safi, The Commentary of Asfi, Wafi (on exposition of Usul Kafi), Shafi, (the thing which cures), Mafati'h al-Sharayi' (The Keys of Islamic Law), Asrar-o-Salat (The Secrets of the Prayers), Elm-ol Yaghin (Certain Knowledge) on the principles of the religion, Kalimát al-Maknúnah (Hidden Words) The exposition on astronomy, Safina-to-Nejat (The Ship of Relief), the exposition on the Al-Sahifa al-Sajjadiyya, Tarjomat-ol Salat (The Translation of Prayer) (in Persian), The Translation of Taharat (The Purification), the list of the sciences and divan of poems. There are some 13000 lines of poems in his works. He was one of the first to present the revolutionary idea that Islamic prayer does not necessarily have to be in Arabic.

A thorough bibliographic study has shown that Fayz wrote 122 works for a total on over 550,000 lines; of these, about forty have been published. He wrote some 20,000 verses of Persian poetry, mostly in Sufi style, and thirty Persian prose works.

== Philosophy ==
=== Archetypal Images ===
One of Fayz Kashani's most well known contributions to Islamic philosophy is his discourse on the archetypal images. Borrowing heavily from Platonic ideas of universals and particulars, Fayz seeks to articulate the relationship between the spiritual and material worlds and how their interaction fulfills divine will. From the beginning of creation, God entrusted Spirits to govern matter. However, because both spiritual and material substances possess distinct and separable essences, the power of the spiritual world alone is insufficient to establish a connection between the spiritual and the material. There must be an intermediary world which allows this interaction to take place. The archetypal world is a spiritual universe and yet also maintains characteristics of the material world. It is capable of manifesting itself in space and time and so can be perceived by the senses. At the same, it is formed from pure light beyond which the eyes can interpret, and so it transcends space and time as well. In this sense, the archetypal world is neither completely material or spiritual. It merely functions as a realm of existence by which the spiritual and the divine can interact with one another.

Having established the need for the existence of the archetypal world, Kashani expands upon the manner in which the spiritual and the material worlds come to interact with another. It is through the material world and the properties which define it that allow the spiritual world to manifest itself within it and become corporeal. This new corporal reality should not be construed to mean a change of essence. The archetypal world merely allows the spiritual to be embodied and symbolized in the material. As Fayz points out, when Gabriel appeared before Maryam, his spiritual substance was "typified" when he took on a body. The perfection of the spiritual substance was maintained but was also symbolized by his material form and rendered him visible before Maryam. However, just as spirits are corporealized in this intermediary world, so too does the body become spiritualized. Because material and spiritual properties are all connected by archetypes, the material substance itself becomes reflected in the spiritual substance. This allows the perfect soul to transfer itself from its physical form into its spiritual form upon death. In sum, the beings in world of archetypal images are particular forms that are separate from matter, but these forms still are intimately connected to matter.

=== Gnosis ===
In his work Kalimāt-i Maknūnah, Fayz provides a theoretical understanding of knowledge and its impact on the relationship between the individual and his apprehension of divine mystery. His first claim is that the individual's pursuit of truth is an impossible task because the truth encompasses all things. Everything is its manifestation but those whom he calls the "elite" are capable of discerning it from everything that it embodies. Being is a kind of light. Since darkness is not a thing in itself but merely the absence of light, all knowledge of being depends upon the individual's ability to perceive different degrees of light. God represents the highest degree of light and so represents the highest degree of being. God's light is so bright that a veil is placed over all things which seek Him. Since the source of spiritual knowledge is God, this veil acts as a barrier to the individual who wishes by his own power to apprehend divine knowledge. But humans have being as well and so possess a smaller degree of this light and the spiritual knowledge that comes with it. Fayz concludes that God is Being and subsists in Himself while everything else subsists in it and is a reflection of Him.

Fayz later expands on this relationship in his discussion of divine attributes. The divine attributes are identical with the divine substance and yet they remain distinct from it. Each being subsists by its relationship to one of these divine attributes or names. The divine names can be understood in two ways: In the first way, they are hidden but are mirrors which reflect the truth and manifest the truth into the world. In the second way, they are apparent and the truth mirrors them but in the process the truth becomes hidden. Fayz argues that the perfect gnostic is one who contemplates both of these mirrors. He sees the material world as a mirrored reflection of divine truth while also his own essence as being a mirrored reflection of the material world and the divine. The self cannot by his own power apprehend divine truth. Indeed, the self is ultimately the barrier to obtaining it. Thus, viewing one's essence as a mirror of the material world and the divine eliminates the essence of the self and grants the person this knowledge.

=== Ethics ===
Kashani insists upon the importance of Murâbtatah, or vigilance, as a kind of relationship that one may develop with his own soul. The virtue of vigilance can be divided into five stages.

==== Preconditioning ====
Borrowing from the works of al Ghazzali, Fayz likens the relationship between man and the soul to a business venture between two partners. Man and the soul are the partners while life is the capital that is used for investment. In this case, man spends his life refining and purifying the soul in order to reap the eternal benefits from doing so. Like a contract, conditions must be set forth and agreed upon by both partners before investment can take place. Thus, conditions must be placed on the soul by man in order to begin the process of its purification.

==== Self-Supervision ====
Self-supervision is defined by Kashani as a concentrated effort to discover if the conditions set forth are in accordance with the will of God. This stage of vigilance is characterized by a change in the heart that prompts a person to gain satisfaction when occupied with thoughts of heeding divine instruction. Ultimately, the result of achieving this state is a type of knowledge which produces a greater awareness of God as He who observes the action of His servants.

==== Self-Accounting ====
Kashani describes this stage as a state in which the person reviews his actions and strives to know if the conditions set forth for the soul are being met. It involves any kind of consideration of the frequency and order of actions performed and the positive and negative results which follow from them. It is in this stage that a person begins to understand the importance of repentance. Only when a person accounts for the negative consequences of his actions can he begin to repent. Conversely, only when a person accounts for the positive consequences of his actions can he gain satisfaction and joy.

==== Self-Punishment ====
Kashani characterizes this stage as a dedication to keep the soul from further disobedience. It is a means of preventing the soul from obtaining the pleasure it would have possessed if man had not sinned. In order to make sure that the soul does not sin again, the individual must be willing to accept the consequences of their sinful actions. Acts of penance are meant to inflict pain on the soul so that the requirements of divined justice are fulfilled. At the same time, this self-caused pain begins the slow process of purifying the soul of the effects caused by sin.

==== Self-Fighting ====
According to Kashani, there is a tendency of man to avoid the responsibility associated with investing in the soul. Man does not like forcing himself to perform good actions. He desires to do what his will is habitually inclined to do. To keep himself from becoming lazy in his dedication toward refining the soul, the individual must constantly urge himself to do difficult acts of worship and duty so as to compensate for his laziness. Over time, this constant urging will produce in the person a habit that lessens the struggle to always perform good actions.

== Theology ==
=== The Perfect Man ===
According to Kashani, the Perfect Man is one who has manifested within himself one of the divine attributes and has overcome the barrier between the Absolute and the mundane. Further, the Perfect Man is the focal point of mediation and connection by which the unknowable aspects of the Absolute come down into the realm of knowable existence. The attributes of God enter into and become one with man while retaining their essence. At the same time, essential relations are established between man and himself which allow him to participate with the divine but remain distinct from it. While the Perfect man remains alive in this world, he draws upon and continually preserves the self-manifestations of the divine. Because the Perfect man exists as a unity between the material and the divine, the reflection of the divine attributes within him permit change in the material world that he is a part of. More crucial for Fayz is establishing how this connected state of being in the Perfect Man connects to the practice of the Imam. God and his attributes are eternal. By manifesting his attributes into man, God is connecting creation with the divine. Since the Perfect Man manifests the connection of creation to God, the dependency of creation upon God for its existence is also connected to the Perfect Man. In this sense, The world would cease to be without the existence of the Perfect Man. The Imam represents the Perfect Man who functions as an intermediary. Therefore, the Imam is essential for the continuation of the world.

=== Four Major Groups of Muslims ===
According to Fayz, those that comprise the Muslim community are divided into four groups: the philosophers, the mystics, the theologians, and the deviates. Although none of these groups fall within the category of infidel, each in some manner has gone astray in their respective pursuits. Philosophers engage in the search for truth, but their approach is so based in rationalism that it fails to fully comprehend the truth. Their tendency to invoke a priori proofs ignores the importance of tradition and scripture in the effort to gain spiritual knowledge. Mystics and theologians claim to be acting from within the school or tradition they are a part of, but often fall into the trap of pure speculation. Any kind of theological speculation and mystical speculation which is not traceable to the Qur'an and the Hadith is to be immediately discarded.

== See also ==
- List of Iranian scientists and scholars
