= Yusuf al-Bahrani =

Bahraini Twelver Shia cleric (1695–1772)

Shaykh Yusuf al-Bahrani
- يوسف بن أحمد البحراني
- The tomb of Yusuf al-Bahrani near the shrine of Imam Husayn in Karbala

Personal life
- Born: 1107 AH / 1695–1696 CE Al-Mahuz, Bahrain, Safavid Iran (present-day Bahrain)
- Died: 4 Rabi' al-Awwal 1186 AH / 5 June 1772 Karbala, Ottoman Iraq, Ottoman Empire (present-day Iraq)
- Resting place: Imam Husayn Shrine, Karbala, Iraq
- Parent: Aḥmad ibn Ibrāhīm al-Baḥrānī (father)
- Era: 18th century
- Region: Bahrain, Qatif, Fars, Karbala
- Main interest(s): Islamic jurisprudence, Hadith studies, Imami Shi'ism, biographical literature, the Akhbari–Usuli debate
- Notable work(s): Al-Hada'iq al-nadira, Lu'lu'at al-Baḥrayn, al-Durar al-Najafiyya, Masāʾil Shīrāziyya, Kashf al-qināʿ, Anīs al-musāfir wa-jalīs al-ḥāḍir
- Known for: Author of al-Ḥadāʾiq al-nāḍira, a major work of Ja'fari jurisprudence, and Lu'lu'at al-Baḥrayn, a biographical work on Twelver Shia scholars
- Other names: Yūsuf al-Baḥrānī, Ṣāḥib al-Ḥadāʾiq
- Occupation: Islamic scholar, hadith scholar, jurist, author, teacher

Religious life
- Religion: Islam
- Denomination: Twelver Shia
- School: Akhbari
- Jurisprudence: Ja'fari

Muslim leader
- Post: Leading Twelver Shia scholar in Karbala
- Influenced by: His father Aḥmad ibn Ibrāhīm al-Baḥrānī, Allama Majlisi, earlier Akhbari scholarship
- Influenced: Abu Ali al-Ha'iri, Muhammad Mahdi al-Naraqi, Muhammad Mahdi Bahr al-Ulum, Abu al-Qasim al-Qummi, Ali al-Tabataba'i, later Akhbari scholarship

Yūsuf ibn ʾAḥmad al-Baḥrānī (1695–1772) (Arabic: يوسف البحراني), born: Yūsuf ibn Aḥmad ibn Ibrāhīm ibn Aḥmad ibn Ṣāliḥ ibn Aḥmad ibn ʿAṣfūr al-Dirāzī al-Baḥrānī, was a Bahraini muhaddith, faqīh and a key figure in the intellectual development of Twelver Shia Islam. Specifically, al-Bahrani was a key figure in the eighteenth century Twelver Shia debates between Akhbaris and Usulis on the nature of ijtihad and jurisprudence. He is known among Shia scholars for his book entitled al-Ḥadāʾiq al-nāḍira (“The blooming gardens”) (Arabic: الحدائق الناضرة) in jurisprudence. Indeed, he is often referred to as "The author of Ḥadāʾiq" (Arabic: صاحب الحدائق) among Shia clerics.

== Biography ==
Al-Bahrani was born in the village of Māḥūz, in present-day Bahrain; his title of al-Bahrani is a reflection of this fact. Following an attack on the Bahrain island by Oman in 1717, al-Bahrani travelled to Qatif. He became the head of his family after the death of his father in 1719, and travelled back and forth from Qatif, and the island of Bahrain. He then travelled in 1722 to Iran, soon following the Afghan capture of Isfahan. There he settled in Shiraz for at least five years, and then moved to Fasā, in the southeast of Shiraz where he started writing his al-Ḥadāʾiq al-nāḍira, a book he never completed. Following disturbances in the area, his home was attacked, and he lost his library. He then left the area to Karbala, where he became an influential scholar and had many students. Al-Bahrain died in Karbala, while the plague was spreading in Iraq. Yusuf edited numerous books, many of which have survived, including Lu’lu’at al-Baḥrayn "The Pearl of Bahrain", a biographical dictionary of Shia scholars, the last chapter of which was his autobiography.

Al-Bahrani's scholarly influence extended beyond Bahrain through his relocation to Shiraz and Karbala, where he established significant intellectual networks that advanced Twelver Shia jurisprudence and theology. Fleeing the Omani invasion, al-Bahrani preserved his scholarly legacy and strengthened transnational Shia networks, which influenced later religious and political movements in the region. His mentorship and collaborations in Karbala solidified his status as a pivotal figure in Twelver Shia intellectual history.

Despite having an Usuli father, al-Bahrani initially adhered to the Akhbari position. He then took a modified Akhbari stance, criticizing the strict Akhbaris for dividing the ranks of the Twelvers, and praising Allama Majlisi for his middle course (ṭarīq wosṭā).

== The Akhbari - Usuli debate ==
Yusuf grew up in Safavid-ruled Bahrain, at a time of intellectual ferment between Akhbari and Usuli Shi'ah Islam. His family were Usuli clerics who also worked as pearl merchants. The 1717 Omani invasion of Bahrain forced him and his family to flee, first to Qatif, then to Mecca and then Shiraz, before he eventually settled in Karbala. In Karbala he became the prestigious dean of the Shi'i scholarship and as such presided over the religious establishment.

Yusuf adopted the Akbhari school, rejecting his early Usuli schooling in Bahrain. Yusuf's thought evolved from a strict Akhbarism to a position that adopted some Usuli elements; he became his generation's chief proponent of the neo-Akhbari creed. Nevertheless, he rejected Usuli principles of legal reasoning, the syllogistic logic Usulis allowed in interpreting the law, and the legitimacy of holy war during the Occultation of the Imam. Historian Juan Cole summarises al-Bahrani's thought as:

al Baḥrānī‘s neo-Akhbārism accepted only two sources for ʾImāmī jurisprudence, the Qurʾān and the oral reports from the ʾImāms. He did not, however, go so far as to say that no verse in the Qurʾān could be understood without the interpretation of the Imams, a position held by the Safavid-era Akhbāri revivalist Astarābādī which Shaykh Yūsuf denounced as extremist. He rejected the ʾUṣūlī principles of consensus (ʾIjmāʿ) and independent reasoning (ʿAql, ʾIjtihād). Indeed, he questioned rationalist approaches to religion in general, quoting with approval a condemnation of reading philosophy and theosophy. But Shaykh Yūsuf accepted the validity of Friday prayers in the Occultation and did not completely reject ʾUṣūlī positions on other issues. His Baḥrānī neo-Akhbārism sought to be an intermediate path between extremist ʾUṣūlism and extremist Akhbārism.

It has been proposed by that Yusuf may have found the state-centric Usulism less appealing given the political turmoil he had experienced throughout his life: first as a refugee from his homeland and then again when the Safavids were deposed by Afghan invaders.

Cole gives three reasons for the triumph of Akhbarism in Bahrain over the Usulis: the invasions of Bahrain and Safavid Iran by Omanis and Afghans respectively, which undermined the state centric Usulism; a generational gap that appeared at the end of the seventeenth century in strict Usuli families with sons disappointed at the Usuli clerics' failure to meet the Omani and Afghan challenges; and geographical divisions emerged between Diraz where Yusuf's influence was strongest and the old Safavid Usuli centre of Bilad Al Qadeem.

In Karbala, Yusuf and his followers continued the intellectual debate with Usulism that has spurred Bahrain's intellectual vitality. Under al-Bahrani's influence Karbala was dominated by Arab ulema-merchants, although the first Usuli cell was founded by Iranian cleric Muhammad Baqir Behbahani in the 1760s. Behbahani gradually became more confident, and with a growing number of students as well as wealth from relatives in Iran and India, he began to challenge al-Bahrani, eventually succeeding him as the dominant intellectual in Karbala when al-Bahrani died in 1772. Al-Bahrani apparently had a civil relationship with Behbahani as the latter led the prayers at al-Bahrani's funeral.

== See also ==
- Usfurids
- History of Bahrain
- Maitham Al Bahrani
- Salih Al-Karzakani
- Abdullah al Samahiji
