= Salih al-Karzakani =

Bahraini theologian and Safavid court judge

Sheikh Salih Al-Karzakani (Arabic: صالح الكرزكاني) was a seventeenth-century Bahraini theologian who was appointed by the Safavid empire as a religious court judge in Shiraz. Al Karzakani left Bahrain along with his friend and fellow cleric Sheikh Ja`far bin Kamal al-Din (d. 1677) because they fell upon hard times and like many Bahraini clerics at the time went to Hyderabad in the Shia-ruled Sultanate of Golkonda in South India. The two had made a pact that whichever of them first struck it rich through patronage abroad would help the other.

Later in his life Al-Karzakani was invested with the robe of honour by the Safavid Shah when he was appointed to Shiraz as court judge. Al-Karzakani, like other prominent Bahrain scholars such as Yusuf Al Bahrani, was a follower of the Akhbari tradition within Shia thought and was initially inclined to reject the appointment – the Akhbaris being traditional wary of state power, unlike most Persian clerics who followed the less conservative Usuli school. Al Karzakani was eventually prevailed upon to accept by friends and notables who implored him not to incur the Shah's wrath.

He hailed from the village of Karzakan in Bahrain.
