= Sallar Deylami =

Sallar Deylami (Persian:سلار دیلمی) is one of the first Iranian Shia jurists during the fifth century of the Islamic calendar (11th century CE). He is considered a jurist of the class of Shaykh Tusi.

== Birth ==
Abu Ali Hamzeh Ibn Abdul Aziz, known as Sallar Deylami (died in 448 or 463 Lunar Hijrah) was a Shia Jurist and religious scholar during the fifth lunar hijrah. He was born in the last half of fourth lunar hijrah, in Deylaman. He was the candidate of Shaykh Mufid and Sharif al-Murtaza in the affairs of teaching and education. He was versed in different disciplines and subjects but his dominance in fiqh is more prevalent. He is considered to be an eminent pupil of Shaykh Mufid and Sayyed Murtaza. He is also considered to be an important religious scholar after the occultation of Imam Mahdi the twelfth Shia Imam. His title, Abu Ya'li, designates dignity and superiority. The name Sallar may be an Arabized form of the Persian Salar.

== Characters ==
Allameh Hilli considered Sallar among the eminent Shia jurists and writers. Abul Qasem khoei knows Sallar as trustworthy and reliable in tradition and jurisprudence. Some scholars like Soyuti count Sallar among the men of knowledge of Nahv (the grammar of the Arabic language). He also counted among ten Al-Marāsim al-‘Alawīyah fī al-aḥkām al-Nabawīyah. This book is considered among the early books on Shia jurisprudence. The part on peace is an independent section in Al-Marasem.

- Al-Muqna fi Madhhab
- Al-Taghrib fi Usul al-Fiqh
- Al-Tazkarah fi Haqiqat al-Juhar wa Araz ("A note on the reality of substance and property")
- Al-Abwab wa Usul fi Fiqh
- Al-Masa'il al-Sallariyah

There are two eminent works by him written about shia jurisprudence. One of them is Tatmīm al-mulakhkhaṣ considered as a glossary on the book of Sharif Murtaza's "al-Mulakhkhaṣ". The book of Tatmim is lost. The other eminent book is called "Kitāb al-marāsim" many times published.

== Juridicial judgments ==
He believed in the prohibition of creating sculpture. In addition, he divided criminals according to their intention of causing harm or not, into intentional, deliberate action and quasi-deliberate. Also he believes in legality of praying on Friday provided that the presence of infallible Imam or someone on behalf of him is included.

== Recent events ==
In 2013, a congress was held for the sake of his place in Shia jurisprudence at the University of Tabriz in Iran. Some Mujtahid such as Ayatollah Nouri Hamedany and Jafar Sobhany delivered messages to this conference.

== See also ==
- Usuli
- Fiqh
- Usul Fiqh in Ja'fari school
- Qom Seminary
