= Al-Allama al-Hilli =

Iraqi Arab Islamic theologian and scholar (1250–1325)

al-Ḥasan bin Yūsuf bin ʿAli ibn al-Muṭahhar al-Ḥillī الحسن بن يوسف بن علي بن محمد بن مُطهّر الحلي
- Title: al-Allāmah al-Ḥillī (The Sage of Hillah) ʾĀyatullāh (Sign of God)

Personal life
- Born: 23 or 25 December 1250 Hillah, Iraq
- Died: 27 or 28 December 1325 (aged 75) Hillah, Iraq
- Era: Islamic Golden Age, Ilkhanate
- Main interest(s): Kalam, tafsir, hadith, ilm ar-rijal, usul, and fiqh
- Notable work(s): Nahj al-Haqq wa Kashf al-Sidq, Tadhkirat al-Fuqahā, Minhaj al-Karamah, Kashf al-Yaqin, and others
- Known for: First scholar to be referred to as "Ayatollah"; Coining the term and developing Ijtihad in Shi'i Usul al-fiqh Disseminating Shia Islam in Persia

Religious life
- Religion: Islam
- Denomination: Shia
- Sect: Twelver
- Jurisprudence: Ja'fari

Muslim leader
- Influenced by: Muhaqqiq al-Hilli, Maitham Al Bahrani, Najm al-Dīn al-Qazwīnī al-Kātibī, Nasir al-Din al-Tusi, and others

Jamāl ad-Dīn al-Ḥasan ibn Yūsuf ibn ʿAli ibn al-Muṭahhar al-Ḥillī (Arabic: جمال الدين الحسن بن يوسف بن علي بن مطهّر الحلي; December 1250 – December 1325), commonly known as al-Allāmah al-Ḥillī (Arabic: العلامة الحلي, "The Sage of Hillah"), was a Twelver Shi'a Muslim scholar and theologian of Iraqi Arab descent. He is widely regarded as one of the most influential Twelver Shi'i scholars of his time. He was a leading Twelver theologian and an influential early mujtahid in Shiʿi jurisprudence. Later sources retrospectively call him "Ayatollah", though the title originated centuries after his death.

According to Al-Hurr al-Amili, his works were enumerated as many as sixty-seven times in bibliographical records. He lived during the time of the Mongol Ilkhanate rule over Iraq and Iran, and significantly influenced the Ilkhan ruler Öljaitü. During the Ilkhanid era, Al-Ḥillī promoted Twelver Shiʿism in Iran. His debates helped convince Öljaitü to convert around 1309–1310, elevating the status of Twelver Shi'ism at court until the Safavids fully established it as the state religion in 1501.

== Life ==
Al-Hilli was born in Hillah, Iraq. He became known as ‘al-ʿAllāma’ (the great scholar) due to his influence in establishing the city as the center of Shia Islam while Sunni leaders maintained control over Baghdad. He was born into a prominent family of Shia jurists and theologians. His father, Sadid al-Din al-Hilli, was a respected mujtahid and a leading figure in the Shia community. His maternal uncle, Muhaqqiq al-Hilli, was also a renowned scholar.

Al-Hilli studied theology and Islamic jurisprudence in Hillah under the auspices of his father, uncle, and other notable scholars, including Ali ibn Tawus al-Hilli and Ahmad ibn Tawus al-Hilli. He may have had indirect exposure to the intellectual circles associated with the Maragheh observatory, and was influenced by the philosophical works of Nasir al-Din al-Tusii and Fakhr al-Din al-Razi. Later, he traveled to Baghdad and became acquainted with the doctrines of ibn Arabi.

Among his other teachers were Najm al-Dīn al-Qazwīnī al-Kātibī and al-Bahrani. He also sat with Sunni scholars to study Sunni jurisprudence. Like Bahrani and Tusi, Hilli lived during the Mongol invasion of Persia and Mesopotamia and played a role similar to that of his teachers in navigating the political landscape.

Al-Hilli's bibliography comprises about 120 titles. Some of his works have been published, while the manuscripts of others have yet to be found.

After studying philosophy, theology, and astrology under the eminent scholars of his time, Al-Hilli began a prolific career as an authoritative writer in his own right. Some 500 works are attributed to him, although only a fraction have been published. He moved to Persia in 705/1305, where he became highly influential in spreading Twelver Shi'ism within the Ilkhanate's court circles.

At the court of the Il khan Öljaitü, it is believed he successfully converted the ruler from Sunni Islam to Twelver Shia Islam. As a result, Öljaitü proclaimed Twelver Islam as the state religion of Iran, and coins were subsequently minted in the names of the Twelve Imams. Both al-Hilli and his son, Fakhr al-Muhaqqiqin, engaged in extensive theological and jurisprudential debates with local Sunni scholars. Having impressed the Ilkhan, he was appointed to the traveling madrasa sayyara. Al-Hilli eventually returned to his hometown where he spent the last years of his life teaching.

== Intellectual output ==
According to some sources, Al-Hilli wrote more than a thousand works (including short treatises and epistles) on Islamic law, jurisprudence, theology, and tafsir (Qur'anic commentary). Of these, about sixty are still extant, and only eight have been published. They are "regarded by the Imami Shi'ia as the most authentic expositions of their dogma and practice". The popularity and influence of his writings on later scholars are demonstrated by the large number of manuscripts and the extensive commentaries written on them. Al-Hilli recorded all of his writings up to the year 1294 in his autobiographical work, Khulasat ul-Aqwal (The Summary of Opinions).

=== Theology ===
Demonstrated by his earliest writing on theology, Manhaj ul-Yaqin fi Usul il-Din, Al-Hilli was acquainted with the Basran school of Mu'tazilism. He was deeply influenced by Nasir al-Din al-Tusi and wrote a commentary on the latter's famous Tajrid ul-I'tiqad. This commentary is one of al-Hilli's most widely read works, serving as the first commentary written on the Tajrid and forming the basis of later commentators' understanding of Tusi's text. Due to his work in Tajrid ul-I'tiqad, Al-Hilli is noted as one of the first Shia Imamiyyah scholars to use the term ijtihad in the sense of "exertion of the utmost effort in acquiring the knowledge of the laws of the Shariah". From this point onward, the Shia intellectual tradition largely accepted this term.

Another of his most famous theological works is The Eleventh Chapter (an allusion to an earlier work of his, Manhaj ul-Salat, which contained ten chapters). He composed it towards the end of his life as a concise summary of Shia doctrines for the educated layperson. Judging by the number of commentaries written on it and its translation into Persian and English, it represents his most popular work.

Al-Hilli wrote several polemical treatises during his time at the court of the Ilkhan, largely directed against Sunni, Ash'arite theology. In them, he was primarily concerned with espousing and defending the Shia view of the Imamate and Mutazilite notions of free will (as opposed to Asharite determinism). He was also acquainted with Avicennan and Ishraqi philosophy. He wrote several works of his own dealing with subjects such as logic, physics, metaphysics, and mathematics. He was highly critical of the opinions held by Islamic philosophers, setting out to rebut them whenever they appeared to conflict with mainstream theology. According to the Encyclopaedia of Islam, "his services were so much appreciated by the Shi'is that soon after his death his grave in Mashhad became one of the centres of veneration for those who go on pilgrimage to the tomb of Imam 'Ali-al-Rida".

=== Jurisprudence ===
Al-Hilli's role in shaping Twelver principles of Islamic jurisprudence is significant. He produced a voluminous legal corpus alongside several foundational commentaries. Two of his most important works are al-Mukhtalaf ("The Disagreement") and al-Muntaha ("The End"). Al-Mukhtalaf is a legal manual devoted to addressing questions in which Twelver jurists hold differing opinions, whereas al-Muntaha is a systematic and detailed exposition of al-Hilli's own legal opinions. He also wrote a summarized legal manual, Qawa'id ul-Ahkam, which was highly popular amongst later scholars. Among his later legal works is Tadhkirat al-Fuqaha, a legal manual intended for use by laypersons. He also composed works on specific issues such as hajj and salat.

Al-Ḥillī's contribution to jurisprudence, the Mabādiʾ al-wuṣūl ilā ʿilm al-uṣūl, was translated in a dual Arabic-English edition as The Foundations of Jurisprudence: An Introduction to Imāmī Shīʿī Legal Theory by Sayyid Amjad H. Shah Naqavi and published by the Shīʿa Institute Press's Classical Shīʿah Library imprint in collaboration with Brill Publishers in 2016. According to Naqavi, al-Ḥillī's "Mabādiʾ is a veritable summa of jurisprudence that offers a concise and highly condensed overview of the entire subject of jurisprudence (uṣūl al-fiqh), as well as a vista from which to fully survey the state of jurisprudential theory in both the era of the author and in that leading up to it."

Naqavi states that the first chapter of the Mabādiʾ concerns the philosophy of language, including discussions regarding the relationship between meaning and reference, the semantic properties of an utterance, and the proposed origins of language. Language is key to al-Ḥillī's jurisprudential thinking because, as Naqavi notes, "all subsequent discussions in the Mabādiʾ depend on how the revealed word of the Qurʾān, as well as the recorded Prophetic and Imāmic utterances, are to be practically interpreted and understood for the purposes of jurisprudential theory."

The second chapter in Foundations of Jurisprudence explores rulings (al-aḥkām) and includes discussions on "the ethical evaluation and analyses of an action, the correspondent rulings that will therefore be applied to it, [and] the conditions according to which the ruling for an action can be qualified by its manner of performance."

The third chapter, entitled 'On the Commands (al-awāmir) and Prohibitions (al-nawāhī)', begins 'with a linguistic inquiry into which utterances constitute a command... ʿAllāmah then offers [an] intensely detailed mapping and typology of the different kinds of obligation which utterances can produce'. The Mabādiʾ contains further chapters on Generality (al-ʿumūm) and Specificity (al- khuṣūṣ), the Ambiguous (al-mujmal) and the Elucidated (al-mubayyan), Actions (al-afʿāl), Abrogation (al-naskh), Consensus (al-ijmāʿ), Narrations (al-akhbār), Analogical Reasoning (al-qiyās), Preferment (al-tarjīḥ), and Juristic Reasoning (al-ijtihād).

For Naqavi, al-Ḥillī's contribution can be summarized by his upholding of the principle of indifferency (al-ibāḥah) regarding the state of all things prior to the revelation of divine law; his assertion that the command (al-amr) neither signifies a one-off performance nor a repeat performance; his view that social prohibitions do not automatically demand the unsoundness (al-fasād) of the prohibited thing; and that the term juristic reasoning (al-ijtihād) should be understood as "an utmost scientific endeavour undertaken in order to infer a legal ruling (al-ḥukm al-sharʿī) from the evidence."

== Works ==
One of his works on the concept of the Shia Imamate (Minhaj al-karamah) was criticized by the Sunni scholar Ibn Taymiyyah in his nine-volume work Minhaaj As-Sunnah An-Nabawiyyah. Besides various treatises on religious law, 'Allamah established a systematic version of the science of tradition (hadith and akhbar), based on principles which were later to antagonize the usuliyun and the akhbariyun. In the kalam tradition, he left a commentary on one of the first treatises written by one of the oldest Imamite mutakallimun, Abu Ishaq Ibrahim al Nawbakhti. Similarly, he wrote influential commentaries on the treatises by Nasir al-Din al-Tusi. He also left a summary of the vast commentary by his teacher Maytham al-Bahrani on the Nahj al-Balagha.

Using the methods of both a theologian and a philosopher, he wrote studies on Avicenna's Al-Isharat wa-'l-tanbihat (Remarks and Admonitions) and Kitab Al-Shifaʾ; attempted to solve the difficulties (hill al-mushkilat) of al-Suhrawardi's Kitab al-talwihat (Book of Elucidations); and wrote a treatise comparing the Ash'arites and the Sophists. He also penned encyclopaedic treatises like The Hidden Secrets (al-Asrar al-khafiyyah) in the philosophical sciences, and a Complete Course of Instruction (Ta'lim tamm) on philosophy and kalam. He cast doubt on the principle Ex Uno non fit nisi Unum (only One can proceed from the One), and conceded the existence of an intra-substantial motion, heralding the theory of Mulla Sadra.

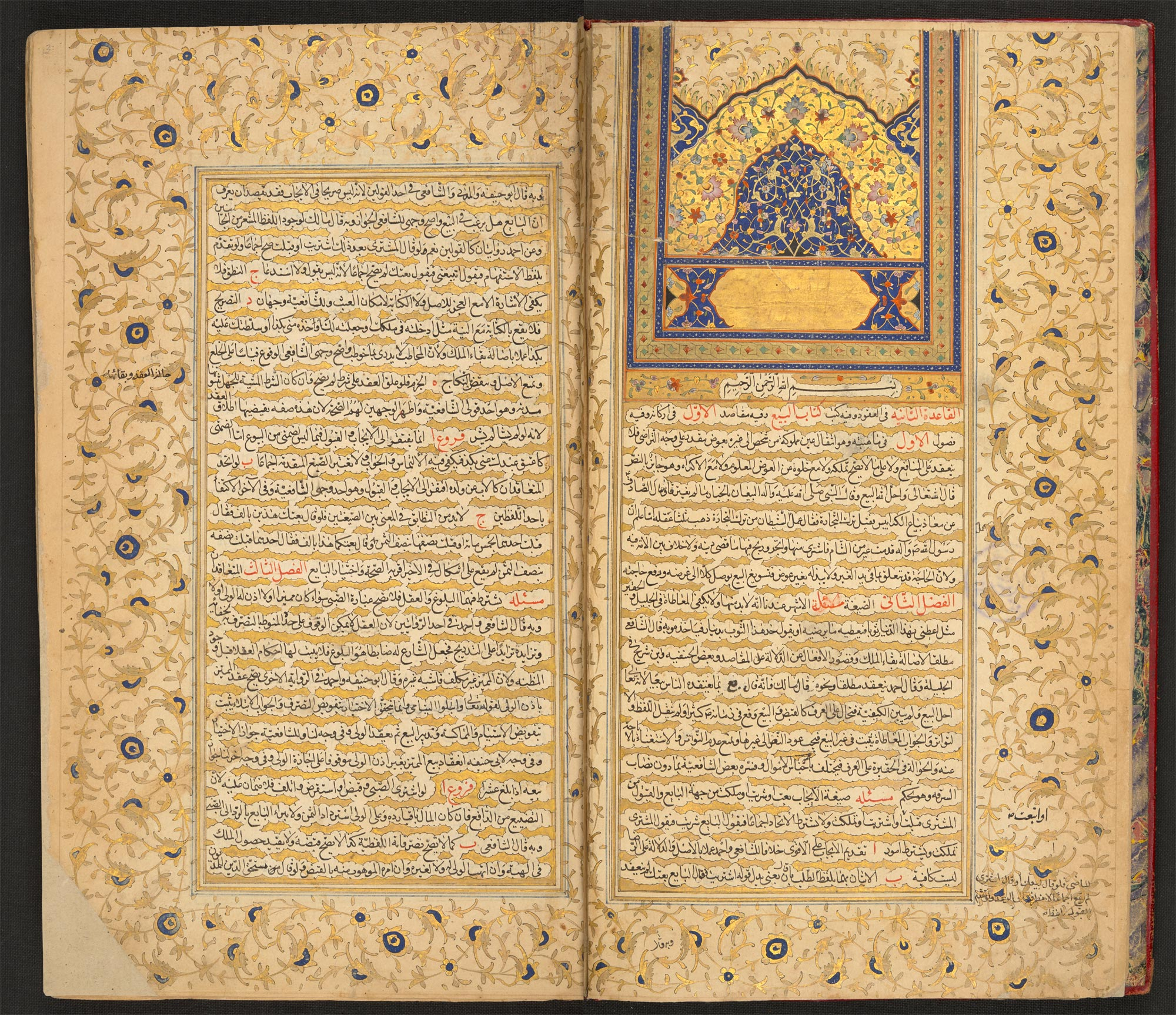
Tadhkirat al-Fuqahā', the opening double page of manuscript has an illuminated floral headpiece in the style of the Safavid period in Iran (1501–1732), with colours predominantly in gold, blue and pink. The wide margins are illuminated with bold floral and arabesque decorations in gold and blue, and the text is within gold cloud bands.

His most notable works include:

1. Kashf al-Yaqin fi Faḍā'il Amīr al-Mu'minīn, a short treatise on the excellence of Ali ('Alī Ibn Abī Ṭālib').
2. Kihalastah al-Nisab, a treatise on the descendants of Ali, Alawi.
3. Minhāj al-Salat fi kktisar al-Misbah, a work on religious duties, especially prayer.
4. Minhaj al-karamah, a vindication of the Shia doctrine on the Imamate.
5. Manāhij al-yaqīn fi uṣūl al-dīn, a treatise on the fundamental principles of the Shia creed.
6. Ma'ārij al-Fahm, a commentary by the author on his own work Nazm al Barahin.
7. Nahj Al Haq Va Kashf Al Sedq, a refutation of the theology and legal system of the Sunnis.
8. Naẓm al Barāhīn fi Uṣūl al-Dīn, a work on scholastic theology.
9. Tadhkirat al-Fuqahā, a work on Shia jurisprudence in three volumes.
10. Tahḏhīb al-wuṣūl ilā ʿilm al-uṣūl.
11. Qawāʾid al-Aḥkām.
12. Muḵḫtalaf al-Shīʾa fī Aḥkām al-Sharīʾa, a work describing points of legal disagreement among the jurists.

=== Kashf al-Yaqin fi Faḍā'il Amīr al-Mu'minīn ===
Kashf al-Yaqin
- Author: Al-Hilli
- Language: Arabic
- Genre: History of Islam, Hadith, theology
- Publication date: 1998
- Media type: Print book

Kashf al-Yaqīn or Kashf al-Yaqīn fi Faḍā'il Amīr al-Mu'minīn (Arabic: کشف الیقین, lit. "Certainty Uncovered") recounts the life of Ali ibn Abi Talib, the first Imam according to Shia belief and the fourth Caliph according to Sunni belief. It draws upon both Sunni and Shia sources and attempts to provide a theological and historical perspective on Ali's role in early Islamic history. Kashf al-Yaqīn was commissioned by the Ilkhanid ruler Öljaitü in the 14th century.

==== Motive of writing ====
During the life of Al-Hilli, Sultan Khodabandeh (Öljaitü) converted to Shi'a Islam and had coins minted in the name of the twelve Imams, which were circulated in the country in AH 708. Al-Hilli wrote the book at the ruler's request.

==== Content ====
The book is divided into one preface and four parts, including chapters on the following topics:

- Ali's virtues before his death
- Ali's virtues in boyhood and maturity
- Ali's generosity and magnanimity
- Ali's courage in the Battle of Khandaq
- The unity of Ali and the Holy Prophet
- Virtues of Ali's spouse
- The Holy Prophet's prayer for Ali
- Ali and the Aide of the Holy Prophet and Fatimah
- Ali's posthumous miracles

==== Sources ====
In Kashf al-Yaqin, most of the sources referred to are in unison with Sunni belief, such as Musnad Ahmad, Manaqib Kharazmi, Khasaes of Tabari, Al-Yavaqit, Asbab Al-Nozul Al-Vahedi, and Manaqib of Ibn Maqadili. Allameh Majlesi also referred to the book in Al-Bihar.

==== Translation ====
This book has been translated from Arabic into several languages, including Persian and English. The English translation was written by Dr. Ali Akabar Aghili Ashtiani. The book also has four Persian translations:

- Rashaf Al Moeen by Majd Al Udaba
- A translation by an unknown author
- A translation by Hamid Reza Azir
- The Mirror of Certainty by Sayyed Mojtaba Alavi Tarakamahei

=== Minhaj al-Karamah ===
Minhaj al-Karamah fi Ma'rifat al-Imamah ("The Miraculous Way of Knowledge of the Imamate"), also known as Minhāj al-Istikāmah fī Isbātu al-Imamah, is a theological treatise. Al-Hilli wrote his book for the sake of defending the Imamah.

==== Importance ====
The Minhaj al-Karamah fi Ma'rifat al-Imamah was written for, or at the request of, the Ilkhan Uljaytu. It is a statement of the Imami Shi'a doctrine of the Imamate and a refutation of the Sunni doctrine of the caliphate. Ibn Taymiyyah later wrote a refutation of the book, titled Minhaj as-Sunnah an-Nabawiyyah. In turn, other books were written later to reject Minhaj al-Sunnah, such as the Ikmal al-Mennah and the Minhaj al-Shariah.

==== Commentary ====
This book features a three-volume commentary by Sayyed Ali Hoseini Milani in Arabic.

==== Content ====
The book includes six parts. In the first part, he explains his reasons for defending and believing in the Imamate. In part three, he refers to reasons supporting Imam Ali's leadership. In the fourth part, he mentions three proofs for Ali's Imamate. In the fifth part, he rejects those who claimed to be Imam before Ali. Finally, he rejects the reasons presented to prove Abu Bakr's succession.

=== Nahj al-Haqq wa Kashf al-Sidq ===
Nahj al-Haqq wa Kashf al-Sidq
- Author: Al-Hilli
- Language: Arabic
- Genre: theology, jurisprudence
- Publication date: Unspecified
- Media type: Print book

Nahj al-Haqq wa Kashf al-Sidq (Arabic: نهج الحق وكشف الصدق – "Way of Rightness and Discovering Truth") presented claims that Sunnism was at odds with the Quran and that Shiism was the correct interpretation of Islam.

==== History ====
Fazl Ibn Rouzbahan Isfahani wrote Ibtal Al Batel Va Ihmal Kashf Al Atel, which rejected Nahj al-Haqq wa Kashf al-Sidq. Shahid Qadi Nou Allah Shoushtari criticized the latter and defended Hilli in Ihqaq Al Haq.

==== Content ====
The book considered eight major topics:

- The senses (Mahsousat), divided into seven subjects such as perception and conditions of seeing.
- Knowledge, divided into seven subjects such as the necessity of knowledge by men of knowledge, and knowledge on conclusions in assessments.
- God, divided into eleven subjects such as God's powers and lack of a corporeal form.
- Prophecy, divided into three parts such as the innocence of Muhammad's mother and father.
- Leadership, divided into four topics such as the qualities of an Imam.
- Resurrection, divided into two parts such as proving the existence of corporeal resurrection.
- Jurisprudence, divided into two parts such as religious duty.
- Jurisprudence (again), divided into seventeen parts.

=== Tadhkirat al-Fuqahā ===
Tadhkirat al-Fuqahā
- Author: Al-Hilli
- Language: Arabic
- Genre: Hadith, Fiqh
- Published: 1997
- Media type: Print

Tadhkirat al-Fuqahā (Memorandum for Jurists) is a book on Shiite jurisprudence, written at the request of Allamah Al-Hilli's son, Fakhr Al Muhaqqiq.

==== Overview ====
The book of Tadhkirat al-Fuqahā is considered one of the greatest texts on Shiite jurisprudence (fiqh) and is widely cited by other scholars as a reference. Allamah Hilli mainly relies upon the opinions and ideas of Shaykh Tusi rather than those of other Shiite scholars.

Allamah Al-Hilli expresses his intention to explain the summaries of indult (Fatwa) and the rules of the Ulama according to the "best explanations, the most correct way, the most rightness style, and the most confident methods".

The book was later summarized by Ibn Motawwej Bahrani, one of the pupils of Allamah Al-Hilli, in a work titled Mukhtasar Al Tadhkirah.

==== Content ====
The author divided the book into four rules: praying, transactions, unilateral obligation, and judgments. It is structured into fifteen sections, including the book of purity, the books of alms and fasting, the book of safekeeping, and the book of buying (either pecuniary or credit).

The book is characterized by:

- Referencing consensus (Ijma) as Jumhur al-'Ulama (the majority of religious scholars);
- Documentation through the Imam's narrations;
- Rejecting juridical principles such as Istehsan and Qiyas; and
- The use of public resources.

==== Publication ====
Al Tadhkirah has been frequently published in Iraq and Iran. Traditionally, it comes in twelve volumes, but later editions do not necessarily follow this practice.

Parts of Al Tadhkirah were also published by Allameh Mozaffar and sayyed Mortaza Khalkhali in Najaf.

== Professors ==
- Sadīd al-Dīn, Yūsuf bin ʿAli bin al-Muṭahhar al-Ḥillī (father).
- al-Muḥaqqiq al-Ḥillī.
- Raḍhī al-Dīn, ʿAli bin Mūsa bin Ṭawwūs al-Ḥussainī.
- Jamāl al-Dīn, Aḥmad bin Mūsa bin Ṭawwūs al-Ḥussainī.
- Naṣīr al-Dīn al-Ṭūsī.
- Yaḥyā bin Saʾīd al-Ḥillī.
- Mufīd al-Dīn, Muḥammad bin Juhaym al-Assadī al-Ḥillī.
- Jamāl al-Dīn, al-Ḥussain bin Abān al-Naḥwī.
- Muḥammad bin Muḥammad bin Aḥmad al-Kayshī.
- Najm al-Dīn, ʿAli bin Omar al-Kātibī.
- Burhān al-Dīn al-Nasafī.
- ʿIzz al-Dīn al-Fārūqī al-Wāsiṭī.
- Taqī al-Dīn, Abdullāh bin Jaʾfar al-Ṣabbāgh al-Ḥanafī al-Kūfī.

== Sources ==
- Hilli, al-. (2006). Encyclopædia Britannica. Retrieved March 21, 2006, from Encyclopædia Britannica Premium Service
- Tehrani, Aga Buzurg. (date unknown). Tabaqat 'Alam il-Shi'ah. Tehran: Ismailian Publishers. (Arabic)
- Schmidkte, S. ḤELLI, ḤASAN B. YUSOF B. MOṬAHHAR. Encyclopædia Iranica (www.iranicaonline.org)
