= Abdullah al-Samahiji =

Bahraini ayatollah

ʿAbdullāh ibn Ṣāliḥ al-Samāhījī (Arabic: عبد الله بن صالح السماهيجي; 1675–1722) was a Bahraini Shia Islamic scholar who lived during the Safavid period. He was born in the village of Samaheej on Muharraq Island, and like many of his Bahraini contemporaries, he was a follower of the Akhbari theological school—although his father was a pure Usuli who detested Akhbaris. Among his teachers was Sulaymān ibn ʿAbdullāh al Maḥūdhī.

After the 1717 Omani invasion of Bahrain, as Samāhijī fled to Isfahan where he briefly served as the Sheikh ul-Islam. He then settled in Behbehan where he died in 1722.

Among his works is Munyat al Mumārisīn in Arabic, which includes an examination of the Akhbari-Usuli dispute.
