= Al-Bahrani =

Twelver Shia Islamic scholar (1238–1299)

Maytham ibn Ali ibn Maytham al-Bahrani
- كَمَالُ ٱلدِّينِ مَيْثَمُ بْنُ عَلِيِّ بْنِ مَيْثَمٍ ٱلْبَحْرَانِيُّ

Personal life
- Born: 1238 CE Bahrain
- Died: 1299 CE
- Region: Bahrain and Hillah
- Main interest(s): Kalam, Rationalism, Philosophy
- Notable work(s): Misbah al-Salikin, Qawa'id fi ilm al-Kalam
- Occupation: Theologian

Religious life
- Religion: Islam
- Denomination: Shia
- Jurisprudence: Ja´fari
- Creed: Twelver

Muslim leader
- Teacher: Nasir al-Din al-Tusi (in theology), Asaad ibn Abd al-Qahir al-Isfahani
- Students: Nasir al-Din al-Tusi (in fiqh), Allama al-Hilli

Kamal al-Dīn Maytham ibn Alī (Arabic: كَمَالُ ٱلدِّينِ مَيْثَمُ بْنُ عَلِيِّ, romanized: Kamāl al-Dīn Maytham ibn ʿAlī; 1238–1299), commonly known by the nisba al-Bahrani (Arabic: البحراني, romanized: al-Baḥrānī), was a leading thirteenth-century Bahraini Twelver Shia theologian, author and philosopher. Al Bahrani wrote on Twelver doctrine, affirmed free will, the infallibility of prophets and imams, the appointed imamate of `Ali, and the occultation of the Twelfth Imam. Along with Kamal al-Din Ibn Sa’adah al Bahrani and Jamal al-Din ‘Ali ibn Sulayman al-Bahrani, Maytham Al Bahrani was part of a thirteenth-century Bahrain school of theology that emphasised rationalism.

At the same time, Maytham Al Bahrani was profoundly influenced by the disciplines of philosophy and mysticism. He wrote widely on theology related philosophical issues such as epistemology and ontology.

According to University of Bahrain academic Ali Al Oraibi, Al Bahrani's scholarship was influenced by both Imami and Sunni sources:

Maytham expresses admiration for certain Sunni theologians and quotes Sunni traditions, to the extent that it is said in Shi’i circles that while the Sunni ibn Abi al Hadid can be mistaken for an Imami, the Imami Maytham can be mistaken for a Sunni.

In the thirteenth century, Twelvers – particularly mystics – were a growing influence in Bahrain, which had previously been dominated by the Ismaili Qarmatian sect.

The Bahrain school of thought's integration of philosophy and mysticism into Imami Shi'ism had an enduring legacy, influencing fourteenth-century theologians such as Ibn Abi Jumhur al-Ahsai'i. Politically, the intellectual vitality of al-Bahrani and his contemporaries is credited with converting the Ilkhanid monarch, Mohammed Khudabandeh, to convert to Shi'ism and announce a Shia state.

He is buried in Mahooz, Bahrain, where a shrine and mosque have been constructed.

== See also ==
- History of Bahrain
- Abdullah al Samahiji
