= Sayyid Hashim al-Bahrani =

Bahraini Shia scholar

Sayyid Hashim al-Bahrani (Arabic: السيد هاشم البحراني) also known as Sayyid Hashim al-Tublani (Arabic: السيد هاشم التوبلاني) (d. 1107 or 1109 AH) was a Twelver Shia jurist, muhaddith, exegete, and historian from Bahrain. He is known for his Al-Burhan Fi Tafsir al-Quran, a traditionary (riwayi) exegesis of the Quran. Shia scholars frequently praised him, including his contemporary Shaykh Al-Hurr al-Amili, author of the comprehensive hadith compilation Wasa'il al-Shia, which remarked his virtues and high status. He is considered by Shaykh Yusuf al-Bahrani to be second only to Allama Majlisi in terms of compilation and collection of Shia hadith.

== Biography ==
Al-Bahrani is said to be a descendant of al-Sharif al-Murtada Alam al-Huda, and thus of Imam Musa al-Kadhim, though him being a descendant of Alam al-Huda is disputed. He has the surname of sayyid meaning descendant of Muhammad. He was born in the village of Katkan in Tubli, Bahrain; his title of al-Bahrani alludes to this fact. It is likely that he was born in Tubli no later than 1050 AH. Al-Bahrani held a privileged position in Bahrain, where he not only wrote and taught, but also took charge of juridical, religious, and social affairs. After the death of Muḥammad b. Majīd al-Māḥūzī, Sayyid Hashim became the supreme religious authority in Bahrain, and was also regarded as one of the leading religious authorities of his time in the larger Shia world.

Despite his numerous works, and religious authority in Bahrain, not a single work of his appears to contain a fatwa or legal opinion. This is taken by some to mean that al-Bahrani's knowledge of jurisprudence was somewhat deficient, while others argue that he refrained from issuing fatwas, and limited himself to writing about the sources of jurisprudence due to his piety (taqwa), even though al-Bahrani was a faqih, and highly knowledgeable of jurisprudence.

=== Teachers ===
There is little information about al-Bahrani's teachers, and only a handful of scholars that granted him ijazah are known. He completed an important part of his education in Bahrain, but also made several trips to Mashhad, and Najaf. In Mashhad, he studied under Abd al-ʿAẓīm b. ʿAbbās al-Astarābādī which was an Akhbari scholar, and a pupil of Shaykh Baha al-din al-Amili, and al-Bahrani received an ijaza from him. He also received another ijaza from Shaykh Fakhr al-Dīn b. Ṭarīḥ al-Rammāḥī al-Najafī.

=== Students ===
Notable students and hadith transmitters of al-Bahrani include Al-Hurr al-Amili, Maḥmūd b. ʿAbd al-Salām al-Maʿnī al-Baḥrānī, ʿAlī b. ʿAbd Allāh Rāshid al-Maqābī al-Baḥrānī, Sulaymān b. ʿAbd Allāh al-Sitrāwī al-Māḥūzī, Muḥammad al-ʿAṭṭār al-Baghdādī, Haykal b. ʿAbd ʿAlī al-Asadī al-Jazāʾirī, and Shaykh Ḥasan al-Baḥrānī.

=== Death ===
Al-Bahrani died in 1107 or 1109 AH. He was buried in the Mātīnī cemetery of the village of Tubli in Bahrain. His resting place is now contained within a mosque that bears his name in the same village of Tubli, Bahrain.

== Works ==
Al-Bahrani is said to have authored 75 works, most of them concerning religious sciences. He is especially known for his Al-Burhan Fi Tafsir al-Quran, which is one of the most important traditionary (riwayi) commentaries on the Quran based on Shia hadith.

=== Al-Burhan Fi Tafsir al-Quran ===
Sayyid Hashim completed Al-Burhan in 1097 AH. Al-Burhan was dedicated to the Safavid Shah Sulayman, and it covers many areas of religious sciences like narratives about the prophets, and traditions highlighting the virtues of the Imams of Ahl al-Bayt, and their correlation to the verses of the Quran.

In Al-Burhan, al-Bahrani confines himself to hadith citations, and does not add any personal comments. He cites the hadith, without noting the strength or weakness of its sanad. The commentary is devoid of any personal comments of al-Bahrani, except for the comprehensive introduction, in which he adds his own understanding and analyses. In the introduction, al-Bahrani says that the only true custodians of the Quranic sciences are the spiritual successors of Muhammad, and that none but the "pure Imams" (al-aʾimma al-aṭhār) are capable of providing commentary on the Quran. He then provides serious objections to the tafsirs of his time like Al-Kashshaf of al-Zamakhshari, criticizing them for not following Muhammad's advice, and neglecting the virtues of the Imams. Al-Bahrani also strongly forbids others from writing tafsirs other than based on the traditions of the Imams, stressing that only the Imams have access to the Quranic knowledge, and the inward true meaning of the Quran.
