= Al-Burhan Fi Tafsir al-Quran =

Shi'a Muslim tafsir

- Author: Sayyid Hashim al Bahrani
- Original title: البرهان في تفسير القرآن
- Language: Arabic
- Subject: Quranic exegesis
- Genre: Religious
- Media type: Print

Al-Burhan fi Tafsir al-Quran or Kitab al-Burhan fi Tafsir al-Quran, popularly known as Tafsir al-Burhan (Arabic: تفسير البرهان‌), is a Shi'a Muslim tafsir (or exegesis of the Quran) written by Sayyid Hashim al-Bahrani.

== The book ==
There are nearly 12000 exegetical hadiths, narrated from Muhammad's family, collected by some Shi'ah scholars in a number of commentaries well known as Tafasir e Ma'thur (traditional commentaries) in Shi'ah. In the 12th century, most of these traditions were collected in the two large collections entitled Al-Burhan fi Tafsir al-Qur'an, the work of Bahrani.

It is one of the most important Shiism traditionary (rawayi) commentaries in the eleventh and early twelfth century A.H. in Arabic. Its author is Syed Hashim bin Sulaiman bin Ismail al Huseini al Bahrani, the shiism scholar of “traditions believer” (akhbari maslak), commentator, traditionist and author. In this commentary that is in traditional (rawayi) method, he has explained the subjects of religious sciences, narration, prophet news (meaning the accounts of sayings and deeds of Muhammad) and above all, virtues of Imamism Household. Then he has related the hadiths and traditions quoted by household and their relations with Quranic verses, below of it. Al-Burhan commentary has compiled many news and secrets of Quranic sciences in the field of commentary that has been related in the old unknown books. It also has guided the readers to the many traditions that had been hidden for recent commentators.

== Book structure ==
This book contains an introduction and 16 chapters (Bab). In these chapters, explaining the Quranic subjects and commentary viewpoints such as:

- In virtue and superiority of scholar and student
- in virtue of Quran
- in "Saghlien" (Quran [saghle akbar] and tradition [saghle asghar])
- another chapter of the Noble Quran, has not collected in order of revelation
- refrain from personal commentary, the commentator explicitly forbid others to changing the commentary, although here, his intention of commentary is about the interpretation
- the literal meaning and inward aspect of the Quran
- next chapter is about: why Quran has been revealed in Arabic?
- the incompatible traditions with Quran
- the first and the last revealed suras
- in chapter fifteenth, the author explains the progeny and Quran correlation and emphasizing that the inward aspect and knowledge of Quran are with the “Fourteen innocent ones”
- in chapter sixteen, introducing his commentary references and has said some common commentary terms. Bahräni in this commentary, has related only the traditions and news and at the end of each part, has mentioned separately, the recorded traditions.
