= Mulla Ali Kani =

Iranian Shia cleric (1805–1888)

Hajj Mulla Ali Kani
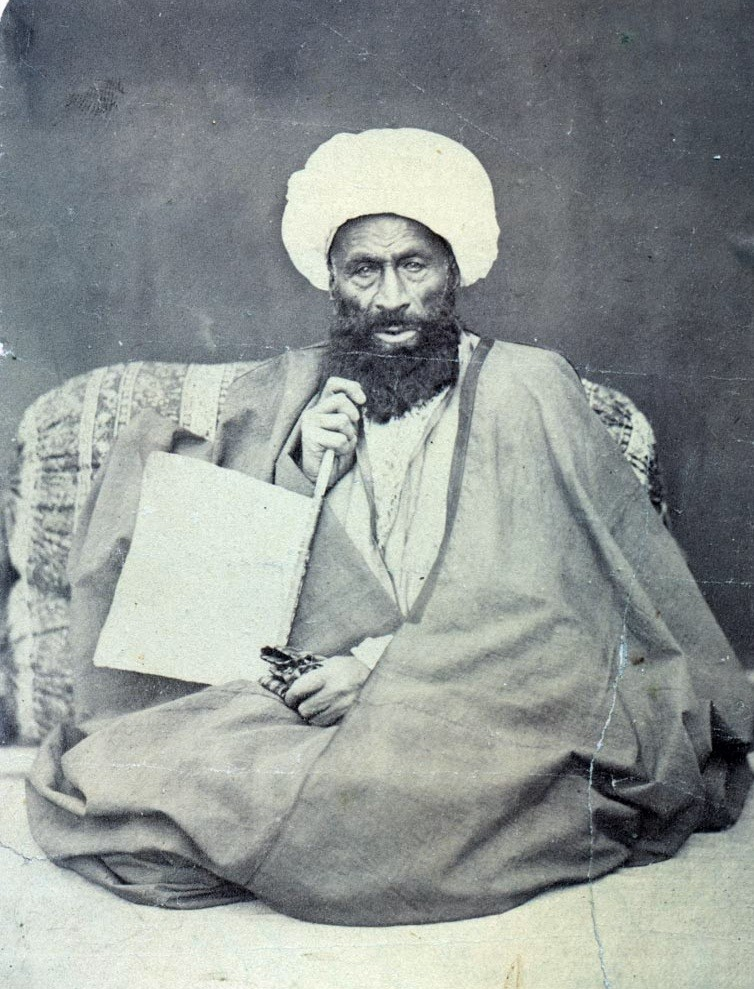
- Born: 1805; Kan, Qajar Iran
- Died: 1888 (aged 82–83); Tehran, Qajar Iran
- Resting place: Shah Abdol-Azim Shrine, Rey, Iran
- Occupation: Scholar
- Known for: Nullify Reuter concession
- Notable work: Tuneup Seminary Marvi
- Father: Ghorbanali Amoli

Mulla Ali Kani (Persian: ملا علی کنی, 1805–1888) was an Iranian Shia Muslim scholar and philosopher involved with the Iranian Constitutional Revolution.

He was a pupil of Muhammad Hasan al-Najafi. Kani was in charge of Iran's religious affairs, and had a great influence on the people and even on Naser al-Din Shah Qajar and his court. After the signing of the Reuter concession in 1873 which in practice made Iran a colony of Britain, Mulla Ali Kani wrote a letter to Naser al-Din Shah, and opposed this contract. He wrote that what Reuter gains through this contract is even more than what Britain gained in India. He also wrote that when there is a flaw in governmental affairs, it is religious scholars' duty to refer to it, regardless of whether the Shah favors this approach, or tries to correct it or not. He asked the Shah in strong terms to cancel the contract and dismiss the prime minister, who was behind the signing of the contract.

As a result of these objections, as well as foreign objections to the contract, Naser al-Din Shah eventually canceled the contract and removed the minister from the office. Kani died in Tehran in 1888 and was buried in Shah Abdol-Azim Shrine in Rey.

== See also ==
- Iranian Constitutional Revolution
