= Akhbar (Shia Islam) =

In Twelver Shia Islam, Akhbar refers to the transmission of hadith, which are traditions regarding the actions and teachings of Muhammad, and his twelve successors. It is the foundation of Akhbari Twelver Shia Islam, which uses it to give rulings for fiqh – Islamic religious law.
