= Mahmood Al Bahrani =

Bahraini politician and businessman

- محمود البحراني

Member of the Council of Representatives of Bahrain
- In office 2018–2022
- Monarch: Hamad bin Isa Al Khalifa
- Prime Minister: Khalifa bin Salman Al Khalifa
- Preceded by: Jameela Al Samak
- Parliamentary group: Independent
- Constituency: 12th District, Northern Governorate

Personal details
- Born: Mahmood Makki Salman Ibrahim Al Bahrani
- Citizenship: Bahrain

Mahmood Makki Salman Ibrahim Al Bahrani (Arabic: محمود مكي سلمان إبراهيم البحراني), is a Bahraini politician and businessman. He was sworn in on December 12, 2018, to the Council of Representatives for the twelfth district in the Northern Governorate.

== Biography ==
Al Bahrani graduated from Ahlia University. In 2015, he founded Maskan Real Estate Development Company.

In 2018, he ran for parliament for the twelfth district in the Northern Governorate. In the first round, on November 24, 2018, he won 1,953 votes for 31.90%. This required a second round, which he won with 2,590 votes for 56.49% over Maryam Modon.
