= 1717 Omani invasion of Bahrain =

1717 invasion of Bahrain by Oman

Date	1717
Location	Bahrain
Result	Omani victory
Territorial changes	End of Safavid rule over Bahrain

Belligerents
(Muscat and Oman) Omani Empire: Al Bin Ali mercenaries	Safavid Empire

Casualties and losses
Unknown	Unknown

The 1717 Omani invasion of Bahrain was the invasion of Bahrain in 1717 by the Imamate of Oman, bringing an end to the 115-year rule by the declining Safavid dynasty. Following the Afghan invasion of Iran at the beginning of the 18th century which weakened the Safavids, the Omani forces were able to undermine Safavid rule in Bahrain and their actions culminated in victory for the Yaruba dynasty rulers of Oman.

Bahraini theologian, Sheikh Yusuf Al Bahrani, provided his personal account of the invasion in his biographical dictionary of Shia scholars, Lu’lu’at al-Baḥrayn (The Pearl of Bahrain):

The earth shook and everything came to a standstill while preparations were made to do battle with these vile men [the Khārijite Omani invasion force]. The first year they came to seize it they returned disappointed, for they were unable to do so. Nor were they able to succeed the second time a year later, despite the help they received from all of the Bedouin and outlaws. The third time, however, they were able to surround Bahrain by controlling the sea, for Bahrain is an island. In this way they eventually weakened its inhabitants and then took it by force. It was a horrific battle and a terrible catastrophe, for all the killing, plunder, pillage, and bloodshed that took place.

After the Khārijites had conquered it and granted the inhabitants safe passage, the people—especially the notables—fled to al-Qaṭīf and other regions. Among them was my father—God have mercy upon him—accompanied by his dependents [i.e., wives] and children, who traveled with them to al-Qaṭīf. But he left me in Bahrain in the house we owned in al-Shākhūra because some chests filled with bundles of our possessions, including books, gold coins, and clothes, were hidden there. He had taken a large portion of our possessions up to the fortress in which everyone had planned to [take refuge] when we were besieged, but he had left some behind in the house, stored in hiding places. Everything in the fortress was lost after the Khārijites took it by force, and we all left the fortress with nothing but the clothes on our backs. So when my father left for al-Qaṭīf, I remained in Bahrain; he had ordered me to gather whatever books remained in the fortress and save them from the hands of the Khārijites. I did manage to save a number of books that I found there along with some that were left in the house, which I sent to him a few at a time. These years passed in an utter lack of prosperity.

I then traveled to al-Qaṭīf to visit my father and stayed there two or three months, but my father grew fed up with sitting in al-Qaṭīf because of the large number of dependents he had with him, the miserable conditions, and his lack of money, so he grew determined to return to Bahrain even though it was in the hands of the Khārijites. Fate, however, intervened between him and his plans, for the Persian army, along with a large number of Bedouins, arrived at that time to liberate Bahrain from the hands of the Khārijites. We followed the events closely and waited to see the outcome of these disasters; eventually the wheel of fortune turned against the Persians, they were all killed, and Bahrain was burned. Our house in the village [of al-Shākhūra] was among those burned.

...During this time, I was traveling back and forth to Bahrain in order to take care of the date palms we owned there and gather the harvest, then returning to al-Qaṭīf to study. [This continued] until Bahrain was taken from the hands of the Khārijites by treaty, after a great sum had been paid to their commander, because of the Persian king's weakness and impotence, and his empire's decline through bad administration.

However, when the Omanis later relinquished control, it did not bring peace to Bahrain. The political weakness of Persia meant that the islands were soon invaded by the Huwala, who Al Bahrani said 'ruined' Bahrain. Almost constant warfare between various Sunni naval powers, the Omanis and then the Persians under Nadir Shah and Karim Khan Zand laid waste to much of Bahrain, while the high taxes imposed by the Omanis drove out the pearl merchants and the pearl divers. Danish German Arabist Carsten Niebuhr found in 1763 that Bahrain's 360 towns and villages had, through warfare and economic distress, been reduced to only 60.

From 1783 Bahrain was ruled by a succession of sheikhs from the House of Al-Khalifa. They continue to rule Bahrain to this day.

== See also ==
- History of Bahrain
