= Mirza Muhammad al-Akhbari =

Sayyid Jamal al-Deen Mirza Muhammad ibn Abd al-Nabi al-Akhbari
- Persian: میرزا محمد بن عبدالنبی بن عبدالصانع نیشابوری خراساني

Personal life
- Born: 21 Dhu'l-Qa'da 1178 AH/1764 AD Akbarabad, India
- Died: 28 Rabi I 1232 AH/15 February 1817 AD Baghdad, Iraq
- Cause of death: Lynching
- Known for: Major scholar of Shiite jurisprudence Akhbari school
- Other name: Jamal al-Deen (lit. "beauty of faith")
- Posthumous name: Shaheed al Muhadditheen ("martyr of the Muhadditheen")
- Occupation: Author; Islamic scholar Marja'

Religious life
- Religion: Islam
- Lineage: Sayyid
- Sect: Shia

Mirza Muhammad al-Akhbari (Persian: میرزا محمد بن عبدالنبی بن عبدالصانع نیشابوری خراساني; born Mirza Muhammad ibn Abd-al-Nabi ibn Abd-al-Sani Nishaburi Khorasani; 1178–1232 AH/1764–1817 AD), was a Shia jurist, muhhadith, and theologian.

== Early life ==
Mirza Muhammad al-Akhbari was born in Akbarabad (now Agra, India) in 1178 AH/1764 AD to a family of religious jurists and theologians. His family claimed descent from the Islamic prophet Muhammad through his descendant, the ninth Shiite Imam Muhammad al-Jawad. The family originally lived in Iran, but his father, Abd al-Nabi ibn Abd al-Sani, moved to India before his birth. Al-Akhbari moved to Iraq in 1198 AH/1784 AD following his return from pilgrimage in Mecca. He died on 28 Rabi I 1232 AH/February 15, 1817 after being lynched by a mob in Baghdad, Iraq. Al-Akhbari had three children: Mirza Ahmad, Mirza Ali, and Zaynab.

== Descendants ==
His descendants continued the family's scholarly tradition, and among them were many jurists, poets, and linguists, including but not limited to:

- Mirza Ibrahim Jamal al-Deen; a Marja'
- Jawad Jamal al-Deen; a Marja'
- Inayatollah Jamal al-Deen; a Marja'
- Ra'uf Jamal al-Deen; a scholar and linguist specializing in the Arabic language
- Ra'uf's son, Iyad Jamal Al-Din; an Iraqi politician and cleric
- Mustafa Jamal al-Din; a poet, scholar, and writer

== Works ==
Al-Akhbārī authored most of his works in Arabic and some in Persian.

=== In print ===
- A'īne abbāsī dar namāyesh ḥaqshenāsī, also indexed as Amāli Abbāsī. This book is in Farsi and was written by the order of Abbas Mirza to refute the beliefs of Jews, Christians and Magi, and to prove prophethood.
- al-Burhān fī al-taklīf wa al-bayān, printed in Baghdad, 1923. A polemic work, establishing the Akhbārī school and rejecting the mujtahids.
- Dawā'ir al-ulūm wa-jadāwil al-ruqūm also known as Tuḥfat al-khāqān. Published in Qom, 1982. In this book, the author has gathered materials from various sciences in circular diagrams and tables, with a list at the beginning of the book.
- Fatḥ al-bāb ilā al-ḥaqq wa’l-ṣawwāb, published in 1924.
- Iqāz al-nabīyya, on jurisprudence, published in Egypt, 1937.
- Maṣādir al-anwār fī al-ijtihād wa al-akhbār, printed in Baghdad, 1923 and in Najaf, 1924.

=== In manuscript ===
- Dhakhīrat al-albāb wa bughyat al-asḥāb, a book in which he presents knowledge in circles and tables, like in his Circles of Sciences.
- Ḥijr mulqam, on the history of ijtihad and twelve reasons for its rejection.
- Ḥurmat al-tanbāk wa al-qahwa, a collection of hadiths and narrations that the author cites to prove the unlawfulness of using tobacco and drinking coffee.
- Tuḥfa amīn or Durr thamin, answering twelve questions raised by Muḥammad Aminkhān Ḥamadānī.
- Tuḥfa jahānbānī (Persian), in proving the Imamate of Ali and other issues in uṣūl al-dīn.
- Tuhfa lārīya also known as lārīya and Mukhtaṣar lārīya.
- Uṣūl dīn wa furū'-i ān, a treatise on the principles of faith.

== Bibliography ==
- Algar, H., “AḴBĀRĪ, MĪRZĀ MOḤAMMAD,” Encyclopædia Iranica, I/7, p. 716; an updated version is available online at http://www.iranicaonline.org/articles/akbari-mirza-mohammad (accessed on 26 April 2024).
- Gleave, Robert (2007). Scripturalist Islam: The History and Doctrines of the Akhbārī Shīʿī School. Brill. doi:10.1163/ej.9789004157286.i-344. ISBN 978-90-04-15728-6.
- Mohammadhoseini, Kamran, and Rasul Jafarian. 2024. ‘Mysticisim and Akhbarism in the Thought of Mirza Muhammad Al-Akhbari An Investigation of Relation Between Ijtihad, Sufism, and Akhbari Movements in the First Half of the 13th Century AH.’ Religions and Mysticism 56 (2): 387–406. https://doi.org/10.22059/jrm.2024.366375.630475.
- Newman, Andrew J., The Nature of the Akhbārī/Uṣūlī Dispute in Late Ṣafawid Iran. Part 1: ʿAbdallāh al-Samāhijī's "Munyat al-Mumārisīn, Bulletin of the School of Oriental and African Studies, University of London, Vol. 55, No. 1 (1992), pp. 22–51.
- Shokri, Reza, translated by Suheyl Umar. “Al-Akhbārī, Mīrzā Muḥammad”. In W. Madelung and F. Daftary (eds.), Encyclopaedia Islamica Online, (Brill, 2015) doi: https://doi.org/10.1163/1875-9831_isla_COM_0239
