= Morteza Ansari =

Iranian Shia scholar (1799–1864)

Grand Ayatollah Sheikh Morteza Ansari Shushtari
- مرتضی انصاری شوشتری
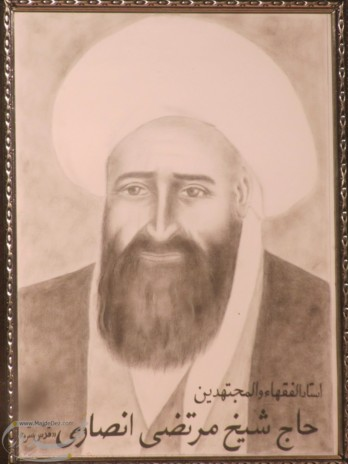
- Title: Grand Ayatollah

Personal life
- Born: 1799 Dezful, Qajar Iran
- Died: 1864 (aged 64–65) Najaf, Ottoman Iraq
- Resting place: Imam Ali Shrine
- Other names: Sahib al-Makasib, Arabic: صاحب المكاسب; Sheikh al-Ta'ifa, Arabic: شيخ الطائفة
- Relatives: Jabir ibn Abd Allah al-Ansari (ancestor)

Religious life
- Religion: Islam
- Denomination: Twelver Shi'a
- Institute: Najaf Seminary
- Jurisprudence: Ja'fari
- Creed: Usuli

Muslim leader
- Based in: Najaf, Iraq
- Post: Grand Ayatollah
- Period in office: 1849–1864
- Predecessor: Muhammad Hasan al-Najafi
- Successor: Mirza Shirazi

Grand Ayatollah Sheikh Morteza Ansari Shushtari (1799–1864; Persian: مرتضی انصاری شوشتری; Arabic: مرتضی الأنصاري التستري, romanized: Murtadha al-Ansari al-Tostari), known as Shaykh al-Ta'ifah (Persian: شیخ الطائفه; Arabic: شيخ الطائفة, romanized: Shaykh al-Ṭāʾifah) was an Iranian Shia Islamic scholar who was “generally acknowledged as the most eminent jurist of the time". He is considered to have laid the foundation of modern Shi'i jurisprudence, and his style has been imitated more than any other classical scholar of Shia Islam. Ansari is considered the "first effective" model or Marja of the Shia or "the first scholar universally recognized as supreme authority in matters of Shi'i law".

In Iraq, al-Ansari is referred to with the honorific Ustād al-Fuqahā wa al-Muhaqiqīn. (Note: Arabic: استاذ الفقهاء والمحققين, lit. 'The Professor of Jurists and Researchers')

== Lineage ==
His nasab is Murtadha bin Muhammad Amin bin Murtadha bin Shams al-Din bin Muhammad Sharif bin Ahmad bin Jamal al-Din bin Hassan bin Yusuf bin Ubaid Allah bin Qutb al-Din Muhammad bin Zaid bin Abi Talib Jabir al-Asghar bin Abdul-Razzaq al-Sha'ir bin Jameel bin Jaleel bin Nadheer bin Jabir bin Abdullah al-Ansari. He thus traces his paternal lineage to the Sahabi Jabir ibn Abd Allah al-Ansari, who hailed from the Arab tribe of Khazraj.

== Early life ==
Murtadha al-Ansari was born in Dezful around 1799 to ethnic Arab parents, right around when the Qajar dynasty had established its power in Iran. He commenced his religious studies in Dezful, under the tutelage of his uncle, himself a notable scholar. At the age of twenty, he made Ziyara with his father to Karbala, Iraq, where he met Mohammad Mujtahid Karbala'i, the leader of the city's scholars. Ansari demonstrated considerable promise during a debate with the senior Mujtahid, who was so impressed that he induced his father to allow Ansari to continue his studies with them.

Ansari studied in Karbala for four years, until the city was besieged by Dawud Pasha and his rebels, causing the scholars of Karbala and their students to flee to Baghdad and the shrine of Musa al-Kazim. From there, Ansari returned to his homeland, where he quickly became restless and resolving to find teachers to continue his religious instruction. After about a year of traveling, he spent two years in Najaf studying under Musa al-Ja'fari and Sharif Mazandarani and a year in Najaf studying with Kashf ul-Ghita.

Returning from a pilgrimage to Mashhad, Khorasan, he encountered Ahmad Naraqi, an authority in Fiqh, Usul al-fiqh and Irfan, and – although Ansari was already a Mujtahid in his own right when he left Karbala – studied with him for a further four years. After again traveling for a number of years, he returned to Najaf where he completed his studies under Kashf ul-Ghita and Muhammad Hasan al-Najafi (author of Jawahir ul-Kalam) and began teaching.

== Religious leadership ==
When the last of the prominent scholars of the generation senior to Ansari died in 1849, Ansari was universally recognized as the 'most learned Mujtahid' (marja') in the Twelver Shia community. His lessons in Fiqh and Usul al-fiqh became incredibly popular, attracting hundreds of students. Furthermore, it is estimated that 200,000 Tomans a year of Khums money was tithed to Ansari's base in Najaf "from all over the Islamic world". Despite this, Ansari lived humbly, generously provided stipends to his Islamic students with these funds, and this resulted in a confirmation of Najaf's standing as center of education for Twelver Shi'ism. In spite of the tremendous prestige attached to his position, Ansari lived the life of an ascetic. When he died, his two daughters were unable to pay for his funeral expenses from his inheritance. He rarely used his authority in the Shia community, seldom judging cases or giving out Fatwas.

From the beginning of the Oudh Bequest in 1850, Morteza Ansari along with Sayyid Ali Naqi Tabatabie transferred the bequest from India through agents. Morteza Ansari had devised a mode of distribution which included "junior mujtahids, low-ranking indigent ulama, students, the custodians of the shrines, and the poor."

== Intellectual contribution ==
=== Ijtihad and Taqlid ===
According to Roy Mottahedeh, Ansari was celebrated for his piety and generosity and "more than that of any mullah leader of the past two centuries, his leadership celebrated his learning." Through the expansion of rational devices in Usul al-fiqh, Ansari implicitly admitted the uncertainty of much of the sacred law. For this reason, he emphasized that only a learned Mujtahid could interpret scripture (i.e. the Qur'an and Hadith) and employ reason to produce legal doctrines. The rest of the community was obliged to follow (Taqlid) the doctrines of these legal scholars.

=== Laying the foundation of modern Shi'i jurisprudence ===
Ansari was the author of some thirty books and treatises, noted for their clarity and readability. Most of his works center on Fiqh and Usul al-Fiqh. Of the former, his most important work is the Makasib, a detailed exposition of Islamic Commercial Law, which is still taught today in the Hawza and has yet to be surpassed. Of the latter, his Fara'id ul-Usul remains an extremely important work. In it, he is credited with expanding the scope of the usul 'amaliyyah (practical principles, as opposed to semantic principles) in Shi'i jurisprudence. For this reason, Ansari is said to have laid the foundations of modern Twelver jurisprudence and his style – more than any other classical scholar – is imitated by the modern jurists.

== See also ==
- Lists of Islamic scholars
- Jabir ibn Abd Allah

== Sources ==
- Mottahedeh, Roy, The Mantle of the Prophet : Religion and Politics in Iran, One World, Oxford, 1985, 2000
- Amin, Muhsin, Ayan ul-Shi'ah, Dar ul-Ta'aruf, Beirut, 1983 (Arabic)
- Murata, S. ANṢĀRĪ, SHAIKH MORTAŻĀ B. MOḤAMMAD AMĪN. Encyclopædia Iranica: www.iranica.com (accessed 29.09.09)
- Momen, An Introduction to Shi'ī Islam
- Tabataba'i, Hossein Modarressi, An Introduction to Shi'i Law: A Bibliographical Study: London 1984
