= Muhaqqiq al-Hilli =

Najm ul-Din Abul-Qasim Ja'far bin al-Hasan bin Yahya bin al-Hasan bin Sa'id, famous as al-Muhaqqiq al-Hilli and al-Muhaqqiq al-Awwal (c. 1205 – 1277) was an influential Arab Shi'i Mujtahid born in the city of al-Hilla, Iraq. He played an important role in shaping Twelver Shi'ism's legal doctrines works. His legal manual, Shara'i ul-Islam, has been particularly influential, attracting more than thirty commentaries.

== Life ==
Muhaqqiq was born in the city of al-Hilla, Iraq, where he would spend most of his life, to a family of prominent Shi'i jurists. He studied theology, fiqh and usul al-fiqh under his father. Muhaqqiq later became the leader of the Shi'i seminary there; when Nasir al-Din al-Tusi visited the town as the representative of Hulagu, he addressed Muhaqqiq as the representative of the city's scholarly elite.

== Intellectual output ==
Muhaqqiq produced an impressive scholarly corpus during his life, treating subjects ranging from fiqh and usul al-fiqh to ethics, theology, philology and even a few volumes of poetry.

His most important work by far is Shara'i ul-Islam, a comprehensive manual of law. It is arguably one of the most important Shi'i legal works ever written, as shown by the large number (more than thirty) of commentaries written on it by later scholars. It has been translated into both Persian and Russian, and was used in British India as the standard statement of Shi'ite Muslim law. In the Shara'i, he divides the law into four distinct categories: acts of devotion (e.g. prayer, fasting), bilateral legal acts (e.g. marriage), unilateral legal acts (e.g. divorce) and rules (e.g. of inheritance). This classification was followed by later jurists.

Another important work of his is Ma'arij ul-Usul, written in the field of usul al-fiqh (jurisprudential methodology). In it, he stresses the centrality of the Shi'i jurist (mujtahid) during the time of the Occultation in deriving a proper understanding of the Shari'ah from the Qur'an, Hadith and statements of the Twelve Imams. In this way, Muhaqqiq's legal theory is heavily indebted to the classical Sunni approach to legal methodology. Whereas before him, it was the authority of the Hadith and not of the Mujtahid that was obeyed.

1. Al-Nafi' fi mukhtasar al-sharayi'
2. Al-Mu'tabar fi sharh mukhtasar al-nafi'
3. Al-Ma'arij fi usul al-fiqh
4. Nahj al-wusul ila ma'rifat 'ilm al-usul
5. Talkhis al-fihrist, which is an abridged edition of al-Fihrist, by al-Shaykh al-Tusi.
6. Istihbab al-tayasur li-'Ahl al-Iraq
7. Sharh nukat al-nihaya
8. Al-Kuhna fi al-mantiq
9. Mukhtasar al-marasim, which is an abridged edition of al-Marasim, by Sallar b. 'Abd al-'Aziz al-Daylami.
10. Al-Masa'il al-Qarya
11. Al-Masa'il al-misriyya
12. Al-Maslak fi usul al-din
13. Nukat al-nihaya

== See also ==
- Shara'i al-Islam

== Sources ==
- Calder et al. (2003) Classical Islam: A Sourcebook. London: Routledge.
- Kohlberg, E. ḤELLI, NAJM-AL-DIN ABU’L-QĀSEM JAʿFAR. Encyclopædia Iranica. (http://www.iranica.com/ accessed 28.09.2009)
