= Muhammad Amin al-Astarabadi =

Founder of Akhbari thought in Twelver Shi'a Islam

Personal life
- Born: Astarabad, Safavid Iran
- Died: 1623/24 or 1626/1627 Mecca, Ottoman Empire (modern-day Saudi Arabia)

Religious life
- Religion: Islam
- Denomination: Shia
- Jurisprudence: Ja'fari
- Creed: Twelver

Muḥammad ʾAmīn ʾAstarābādī (Persian: محمدامین استرآبادی, died 1623/24 or 1626/1627) was an Iranian theologian and founder or proponent of the orthodox conservative (Akhbari) strand in Twelver Shia Islamic belief, those who base their theology on hadiths and reject fatwas. He was born in Astarabad, the former name of Gorgan.

Astarabadi saw himself as a reviver of a lost Islamic tradition, known as the sunnah. He was followed by a number of scholars who explicitly identified themselves with the Akhbari. These scholars called for the return to the hadith sources, in a belief that the words and actions of the Imams were readily seen, but had been corrupted by centuries of excessive commentary.

== Works ==
- Fawāʾid al Madaniyyah fī ar Radd ʿalā min qāl bal ʾIjtihād wa at Taqlīd fī al ʾAḥkām al ʾilāhiyya(فوائد المدنية في الرد على من قال بالإجتهاد والتقلید في الأحکام الإلهية)
- Ḥāshiyyah ʿalā Sharḥ al Madarāk (حاشية على شرح المدارك)
- Sharḥ at Tahdhīb (شرح التهذيب)
- Sharḥ al ʾIstibsār (شرح الإستبصار)
- ʾUnmūdhaj al ʿUlūm (انموذج العلوم)

== See also ==
- Usuli, the denomination within the Twelver Shia school that Astarabadi opposed
