= Muhammad Baqir Behbahani =

Muslim scholar (1706–1791)

Muhammad Baqir ibn Muhammad Akmal al-Wahid Bihbahani, also Vahid Behbahani (1706–1791), was a Twelver Shia Islamic scholar. He is widely regarded as the founder or restorer of the Usuli school of Twelver Shi'a Islam and as playing a vital role in narrowing the field of orthodoxy in Twelver Shi'a Islam by expanding "the threat of takfir" against opposing scholars "into the central field of theology and jurisprudence".

== The dispute ==
In the eighteenth century there was a dispute between the Akhbari and Usuli schools of Shia Islam. Briefly, the Akhbari believed that the sole sources of law were the Qur'an and the Hadith, in particular the Four Books accepted by the Shia: everything in these sources was in principle reliable, and outside them there was no authority competent to enact or deduce further legal rules. The Usuli believed that the Hadith collections contained traditions of very varying degrees of reliability, and that critical analysis was necessary to assess their authority. On this view, the task of the legal scholar is to establish intellectual principles of general application (Usul al-fiqh), from which particular rules may be derived by way of deduction: accordingly, legal scholarship has the tools in principle for resolving any situation, whether or not it is specifically addressed in Quran or Hadith (see Ijtihad).

Traditionally these intellectual principles were analysed through the procedures of Aristotelian logic. The Akhbari scholar Muhammad Amin al-Asterabadi criticised this approach, arguing that since the alleged general principles were arrived at by way of generalisation from the existing practical rules, the whole process was circular.

== The role of Behbahani ==
=== Analysis of probability ===
Behbahani led the Usuli intellectual challenge to Akhbari dominance in Karbala in the 1760s. With the defeat of the Safavid state following the Afghan invasion in 1722 and the rise of a new generation of Bahraini Akhbari clerics, state-centric Usulism lost its self-confidence. The most influential Bahraini cleric, Yusuf Al Bahrani, was installed as the dean of scholarship in Karbala, where he led an intellectual onslaught on Usuli scholarship in the mid-eighteenth century. Behbahani's role in the 1760s was at first to tentatively challenge Al Bahrani's neo-Akhbarism before building up the supporters, confidence (and financial support) to eventually lead an Usuli revival following Al Bahrani's death in 1772.

Behbahani's main contribution to legal theory was the analysis of probability. Granted that general principles cannot be arrived at with complete syllogistic certainty, there are still presumptions, sufficient in ordinary life, for deciding on the better view. For example, where there is doubt whether a given situation (such as ritual purity) exists but it has certainly existed in the past, one can rely on a presumption that it is more likely to have continued the same than to have changed.

Given the probabilistic nature of this approach, and the need for practical certainty, it followed that there must be people with the authority to decide on the application of these principles to particular facts. Accordingly, the role of Islamic jurist (mujtahid) becomes one of political and judicial authority, and not merely one of scholarly expertise. Behbahani is blamed, in particular by Akhbaris, for having used physical force to enforce his authority and for having laid the intellectual foundations of Iranian Shi'a theocracy.

The principles of probability were further analysed by Shaykh Murtada al-Ansari in the mid-nineteenth century, and the Usuli school remains the dominant force in Shi'ite Islam.

=== Takfir ===
According to scholar Moojan Momen, Behbahani played a very important role in Shii Islam by bringing in "the threat of takfir" — i.e. declaring the opponent an apostate, apostasy being a capital crime —

into the central field of theology and jurisprudence where previously only ikhtilaf (agreement to hold differing opinions) had existed. Bihbahani was now to exclude by takfir all who disagreed with the principles of reasoning ('Aql) and ijtihad as sources of law. This paved the way for a great increase in the power and influence of the mujtahids in Qajar times and for the evolution of the concept of the marja at-taqlid.
