= Shaykh Tusi =

11th-century Shia Muslim scholar, jurist and theologian from Iran

Abu Ja'far al-Tusi أَبُوْ جَعْفَرِ مُحَمَّدُ بِنْ الحَسَنِ الطُوْسِّيّ
- Title: Shaykh al-Ta'ifah

Personal life
- Born: Ramadan of 385 Hijri/ 995 CE Tous, Iran
- Died: Muharram 22, 460 Hijri/ December 2, 1067 CE (aged 72) Najaf, Iraq
- Era: Islamic golden age
- Main interest(s): Kalam, Tafsir, Hadith, Ilm ar-Rijal, Usul and Fiqh
- Notable work(s): Tahdhib al-Ahkam, Al-Istibsar, Al-Tibyan

Religious life
- Religion: Islam
- Denomination: Shia
- Sect: Twelver
- Jurisprudence: Ja'fari

Muslim leader
- Influenced by: Shaykh Mufid, Sharif Murtada

Muhammad ibn al-Hasan al-Tusi (c. 995–1067; AH 385–460), commonly known as Shaykh al-Tusi or Shaykh al-Ta'ifa, was a prominent Persian Shia scholar, jurist, mufassir, theologian, hadith compiler and traditionist, and a major scholar of uṣūl al-fiqh (principles of Islamic jurisprudence). Born in Ṭūs, from which his name derives, he became one of the most influential figures in the development of Twelver Shia jurisprudence and theology and played an important role in stabilizing Shia religious practice following the occultation of the twelfth Imam.

Al-Tusi spent much of his scholarly career in Baghdad. Among his principal works were Tahdhīb al-Aḥkām ("The Correcting of Judgements") and al-Istibṣār ("The Examination"), collections of Shia traditions that constitute two of the Four Books of authoritative hadith in Twelver Shia Islam. His Kitāb al-Nihāya ("The Book of Method") was even more influential in the development of Shia jurisprudence. It set out the basis of Shia legal procedure and became the foundation of a legal school that endured for centuries after his death.

Following riots in Baghdad during which his library was burned, al-Tusi moved to Najaf, where he established a major centre of Shia learning and founded the Hawza of Najaf, the oldest and one of the most important Shia seminaries (hawza) in the world. He remained in Najaf until his death in 1067.

== Biography ==
Shaykh Tusi was born 995 AD in Tus, Iran, and by 1018 AD he was living under the Buyid rule. He started his education in Tus, where he mastered many of the Islamic sciences of that period. He later studied in Baghdad, where he entered into the learning circles of al-Shaykh Al-Mufid (949–1022) as the paramount teacher. He started writing some of his earlier works in his twenties. By the time he was forty-two, he had learned from Shaykh Murtaza, attended the scholarly circle of Sunni scholars, and studied the Shafi'i school of fiqh.

Following the Seljuk entry in Baghdad under Abu Talib Muhammad Tughril in 1055, sectarian fighting erupted in the city among Muslims, Sunnis and Shiites, with the Seljuks failing to halt the sectarian fighting. Many Shi'i schools, mosques and libraries were destroyed in the process. Shaykh Tusi's house was burnt down, and subsequently many of his books which he had written in Baghdad. He relocated to Najaf, where a small number of Shiites were based at the time, and started a school. He eventually died in Najaf on 2 December 1067.

=== Influence ===
Tusi had an important role in the formation and revival of Shia jurisprudence and law, as his life coincided with the burning of books and libraries. It is even said that he revived hadith and Islamic jurisprudence. He defended the application of jurisprudence in respect to religious laws. One of his main accomplishments was that he was successful in propagation and making his methodology of argumentation and inference coherent: he had given to Shaykh Mufid a definite formulation of ijtihad. His dominance was unrivaled for a long time and nearly all Islamic jurisprudence was affected by Tusi's opinions. Some of Tusi's works show that he was influenced by precedent jurists like Sallar Deylami. Tusi's influence persisted until Ibn Idris al-Hilli, who criticized some of Tusi's views. He also produced biographies (ilm-rijal), traditions, and compendia of knowledge (Fihrist). He started developments that allowed Shia clerics to assume some of the roles previously permitted to only imams, such as collecting and distributing religious taxes, and organizing Friday prayers.

=== Usuli School ===
In conflict between the Akhbari and Usuli schools, Tusi defended the Usuli and claimed that the rival Akhbari were literalists. He believed in principles of jurisprudence as the fundamental knowledge in acquiring judgment in Islam, and wrote in the introduction to one of his works:

"thus you may say, it is essential to attach the greatest importance to this branch of knowledge (namely Usul) because the whole of shariah is based on it and the knowledge of the any aspect thereof is not complete without mastering the principles."

— Al Iddah', Shaykh Tusi

He compared the positions of the different legal schools of Islam and showed that there is little difference between them. Tusi, like his masters, refuted the legal analogy (Qiyyas Fiqhi) in his manual of Usul Fiqh.

=== Importance of reason ===
His emphasis was on the rational dimension of religion, underlining that principles like the commandment to good and prohibition of evil are indispensable according to reason. Shaykh Tusi also used rational arguments to validate consensus (ijma) as derived from the principle of lutf. According to lutf, God must provide believers with the conditions for religious obedience.

== Contribution ==
=== Najaf Seminary ===
According to some scholars, Tusi established the Hawzeh of Najaf after migrating from Baghdad.

=== Works ===
Tusi wrote over fifty works in different Islamic branches of knowledge such as philosophy, hadith, theology, biography, historiography, exegesis, and tradition. Of the four authoritative sources of the Shiites, two are by Tusi: the basic reference books Tahdhib al-Ahkam and Al-Istibsar. Both of them pertain to hadiths of Islamic jurisprudence. Other books include:

- Al-Nihayah
- Al-Tibyan Fi Tafsir al-Quran
- Al-Istibsar in 4 volumes
- Tahdhib Al-osul in two volumes
- Oddat Al-osul
- Al-fatawa
- Al-Mabsut
- Al-Iqtisad Al Hadi Ila Tariq Al Rashad
- Kitab al-Ghayba
- Ekhtiyar Ma'refat Al- Rijal

== See also ==
- Shia Islam
- Ja'fari jurisprudence
- The Four Books
- Holiest sites in Islam
- Sayyid Murtadhā
- Shaykh al-Mufīd
- Shaykh al-Sadūq
- Muhammad al-Kulaynī
- Allāmah Majlisī
- Shaykh al-Hur al-Āmilī
- Shaykh Nasīr ad-Dīn Tūsi
