= Akhbari =

Sect of Twelver Shia Islam

Akhbarism (Arabic: الأخبارية, romanized: al-ʾAkhbāriyya) is a branch of Twelver Shia Islam. Akhbaris reject the use of intercessory reasoning via trained Islamic jurists to derive verdicts in Islamic law, maintaining it is forbidden (haram) to perform imitation of anyone but one of the Fourteen Infallibles of Twelver Islam. The vast majority of Akhbaris today are to be found in Bahrain, with notable minorities in Iraq, Kuwait and Tanzania.

The term Akhbari is derived from khabara'at, meaning “news” or “reports”, while Usuli comes from Uṣūl al-fiqh, the “principles of Islamic jurisprudence.” Akhbaris, in contrast to Usulis, do not accept Usul al-fiqh—that is, the effort to formulate a coherent set of legal principles based on rulings issued by the Imams prior to the Occultation (ghayba) of the last Imam.

Akhbaris hold that they must directly imitate the Ahl al-Bayt, arguing that the Imams are infallible whereas the marja, regardless of their expertise in jurisprudence, is not. Knowledge of religious rulings within Islamic jurisprudence is therefore transmitted, according to Akhbari belief, through successive generations of Muhaddith who narrate the rulings and hadith of The Fourteen Infallibles without engaging in interpretation. They maintain that the interpretation of the Qur'an and the full, esoteric knowledge of revelation (al-rāsikhūn fi al-ʿilm Arabic: الراسخون فی العلم) are also handed down from the Imams in this manner.

As of the twenty-first century, Akhbari form a small minority within Shia Islam, with Usulis making up the mainstream majority. Akhbarism as a revivalist movement started with the writings of Muhammad Amin al-Astarabadi (d. 1627) and achieved its greatest influence in the late Safavid (1501–1736) and early post-Safavid era. However, shortly thereafter Muhammad Baqir Behbahani (d. 1792), along with other Usuli mujtahids, eradicated most of the Akhbari movement. South Asian regions notable for their Akhbari populations include Hyderabad, Karachi, Sehwan, Lahore, Faisalabad, Chakwaal, and Gojar Khan. with reportedly "only a handful of Shia Ulama remaining Akhbari to the present day."

== Background ==
The foundational belief of Akhbarism is that only the aḥadīth of the Infallibles serve as authoritative evidence in Islam. Akhbaris consider themselves bound by the Hadith of the two weighty things (Hadith ath-Thaqalayn), in which the Islamic prophet Muhammad instructed his followers to adhere to two sources of divine guidance after his death: the Quran and his progeny, the Ahl al-Bayt, whom Twelvers identify as the Twelve Imams.

Accordingly, even during the Major Occultation, Akhbaris maintain that Muslims must continue to follow the traditions of the Ahl al-Bayt. They cite the statement attributed to Imam Muhammad al-Mahdi: “As for the new events that will occur (during my occultation), turn to the narrators of our traditions, because they are my proof to you, while I am the proof of Allah to them.” Akhbaris therefore reject fatāwa based on ijtihad and deny the permissibility of producing Qur'anic exegesis without quoting narrations from the infallible Ahlul-Bayt. They argue—citing the Hadith ath-Thaqalayn and reports from the Twelve Imams—that exegesis must rely exclusively on these authoritative traditions. Akhbaris also reject the generalization of Hadith, maintaining that individual Hadiths are either sound or unsound; moreover, they consider the hadith contained in The Four Books of the Shia tradition to be reliable.

It is reported that Imam Muhammad al-Mahdi acknowledged the reliability of Kitab al-Kafi (one of The Four Books of Shias) and stated that “al-Kafi is sufficient for our Shia.” (By contrast, Usulis question the credibility of this statement, noting that it is not found within al-Kafi itself.)

Akhbaris argue that Usūlism introduced a new basis for Usul al-fiqh centuries after the Major Occultation, relying on hypothetical reasoning and scholarly assumptions. By contrast, early Shī‘a ulamā' such as Muhammad ibn Ya'qub al-Kulayni and Ibn Babawayh focused primarily on the transmission of ḥadīth. During this period, Shī‘a scholars distinguished themselves from the Sunni tradition, which employed methods such as qiyas (analogical reasoning), while Shī‘a law was developed directly from the traditions of the Imams.

In the early Buyid period, Twelver ulamā' believed that since the Imām had entered the Occultation and the Nā'ib al-Khass was no longer present, all functions vested in the Imām had effectively lapsed. These functions included:

1. Leading the Holy War (jihad)
2. Distribution of the booty (qismat al-fay)
3. Leading the Friday Prayer (salat al-juma)
4. Implementing judicial decisions (tanfidh al-ahkam)
5. Administering legal penalties (iqamat al-hudud)
6. Receiving religious taxes, including zakāt and khums.

However, it soon became clear that suspending these functions created significant practical difficulties for the Twelver community, leaving it without leadership, organization, or a stable financial structure.

In contrast to Usulis, Akhbaris believe that the perpetuity of Sharia resides exclusively with the infallibles. Thus, the right to interpret the Qur'an belongs only to the Fourteen Infallibles, who possess complete esoteric knowledge (al-rāsikhūn fi al-ʿilm Arabic: الراسخون فی العلم). While Usulis hold that jurisprudence develops over time through Uṣūl al-fiqh, Akhbaris seek religious rulings within Islamic jurisprudence exclusively from a living or deceased Muhaddith who transmits the rulings and hadith of The Fourteen Infallibles without interpretation. They further maintain that The Fourteen Infallibles (including the Shia Imāms) never permitted Ijtihad.

== History ==
Akhbaris argue that throughout the history of Twelver Shi'ism since the Occultation, Usuli ulama have gradually assumed functions that originally belonged to the Hidden Imam. They maintain that this process occurred in five distinct stages, each representing a further transgression or expansion of authority.

=== First transgression ===
As early as the 5th century AH / 11th century CE—more than 150 years after the Occultation of the 12th Imām—Shaykhu t-Ta'ifa reinterpreted the doctrine to allow the delegation of the Imām's judicial authority to scholars trained in fiqh. In his writings, however, he stresses that this responsibility should be assumed by the ʿulamāʾ only when no other qualified individual is available.

Shaykhu t-Ta'ifa also considered the ʿulamāʾ to be the most suitable figures to distribute religious taxes, given their knowledge of the rightful recipients. Nevertheless, he maintained that individuals were still permitted to distribute such taxes on their own if they wished. He likewise permitted fuqahāʾ to organize the Friday prayer in the absence of the Imām or his specific representative.

Prominent Shīʿa scholars who rejected this interpretation include:

1. ʿAlam al-Huda (a member of Shaykhu t-Ta'ifa's scholarly circle)
2. Ibn Idris
3. Allamah al-Hilli

=== Second transgression ===
By the 13th century, Muhaqqiq al-Hilli had further advanced these ideas by extending the judicial authority of the ulama to include iqamat al-hudud—the implementation of legal penalties by the scholars themselves. His writings show a progression in thought: in his earlier works, the fuqahā' appear as deputies of the donor responsible for distributing religious taxes, while in his later writings they are presented as deputies of the Hidden Imām, entrusted with both the collection and distribution of these taxes. This development effectively exceeded the limits set by Shaykhu t-Ta'ifa two centuries earlier, marking what Akhbaris consider the first major transgression.

=== Third transgression ===
Muhaqqiq al-Karkhi—writing roughly 300 years after the second transgression—was the first to argue, based on the hadith of ‘Umar ibn Hanzala, that the ulama served as the Nā'ib al-'Amm (general representatives) of the Hidden Imām. However, he limited the practical application of this idea to one specific area: assuming the responsibility of leading the Friday prayer.

=== Fourth transgression ===
Shahīd ath-Thānī (Zayn al-Din al-Juba'i al'Amili) extended the concept of Nā'ib al-'Amm to its full implications within the religious sphere, applying it to all functions and prerogatives traditionally attributed to the Hidden Imām. As a result, the judicial authority of the ulama came to be viewed as a direct extension of the Imām’s authority. Payment of religious taxes to the ulama—as trustees of the Imām—thus became obligatory, and donors who chose to distribute these taxes independently were regarded as receiving no spiritual reward. This development contradicted the limitations established in earlier stages of doctrinal interpretation.

Shahīd ath-Thānī also broadened the categories of individuals eligible to receive zakāt by including religious students and the ulama themselves, who were considered its rightful recipients as trustees for students. He further identified a role for the ulama in the sphere of defensive jihād, although he maintained agreement with Akhbari scholars that offensive jihād required the presence of the Hidden Imām and was therefore suspended during the Occultation.

Although these scholars were not mujtahids in the full technical sense, their contributions introduced new concepts into Shī‘a theology that later influenced the development of the exegetical school. However, their ideas were not widely accepted by leading Shī‘a scholars of the period and thus remained largely theoretical.

Traditional Shī‘a doctrine held that legitimate Islamic governance could only be established under the leadership of an infallible Imām. Consequently, Shī‘a communities historically played a limited role in supporting state authority, in contrast to the Sunni alignment with the Ottoman Empire. This stance created tension in regions where Shī‘a populations formed the majority. By the end of the Safavid era, pressures brought on by the rise of global imperialism intensified these concerns. In response, some ulama were encouraged to develop ideological frameworks that could extend state authority over the Shī‘a population by any necessary means.

The revival of Akhbārism—often termed “neo-Akhbārism”—emerged under the leadership of Yusuf Al Bahrani (1695–1772), dean of the scholarly community in Karbala. He spearheaded an intellectual critique of Usuli thought in the mid-18th century. A Bahrain-based Akhbari criticism of Usulism had already begun at the start of the 18th century, partly motivated by perceived weaknesses in the Usuli establishment supporting the Safavid state.

By assuming leadership of the Karbala scholarly community as one of the foremost thinkers of his time, al-Bahrani expanded this Bahrain-centered debate across the wider Shī‘a world.

Al-Bahrani's neo-Akhbarism accepted only two sources for Imami jurisprudence: the Qur'an and the oral reports of the Imams. He did not, however, endorse the view—held by the Safavid-era Akhbari Astarabadi—that no verse of the Qur'an could be understood without the Imams’ interpretation, a position he condemned as extreme. He rejected the Usuli principles of consensus (ijmā‘) and independent reasoning (‘aql, ijtihād) and expressed skepticism toward rationalist religious approaches, approving criticisms of philosophy and theosophy. Nonetheless, Shaykh Yusuf accepted the validity of Friday prayers during the Occultation and did not categorically dismiss all Usuli positions. His Bahrani neo-Akhbarism thus sought an intermediate path between what he viewed as extreme Usulism and extreme Akhbarism.

=== Ayatollah Behbahani ===
Under al-Bahrani, Usuli scholarship was regarded as impure, although al-Bahrani himself did not possess significant political influence. It was Muhammad Baqir ibn Muhammad Akmal al-Wahid Behbahani who decisively challenged the Akhbaris and eventually emerged as the most politically influential cleric in Karbala by 1772. Behbahani’s theology was strongly opposed by the Akhbaris, and what began as a minor doctrinal disagreement escalated into a fierce and hostile dispute, culminating in Behbahani declaring the Akhbaris to be infidels (kuffār). Despite the intensity of the rhetoric, the conflict remained an intellectual one.

Initially, the shrine cities of Iraq contained a large and active Akhbari community. However, by the late 18th century, Behbahani succeeded in reversing their influence and effectively defeating the Akhbaris in both Karbala and Najaf. Although Akhbarism survived in southern Iraq, Bahrain, and a few Iranian cities such as Kirman for several more decades, the Usuli victory eventually became complete, leaving only a very small number of Shī‘a ulama adhering to Akhbarism today.

Following the theological ascendancy achieved by al-Wahid Behbahani—supported in part by coercive measures—the Usuli school became increasingly integrated into, and influential within, the Iranian state structure.

=== Fifth transgression ===
During the first Russo-Persian War (1804–1813), Fath Ali Shah's son and heir, Abbas Mirza, who was conducting the campaign, turned to the new ulama and obtained from Shaykh Ja'far Kashif al-Ghita' and other eminent clerics in Najaf and Isfahan a declaration of jihad against the Russians, thus implicitly recognizing their authority to issue such a declaration – one of the functions of the Hidden Imām. Kashif al-Ghita used the opportunity to extract from the state acknowledgment of the ulama's right to collect the religious taxes of Khums."

This followed the pattern of other transgressions by overthrowing the limits of its prior (fourth) transgression.

=== Iranian Revolution ===
Following the Iranian Revolution, the Usuli school gained increasing popularity within communities that had previously adhered to Akhbarism. The consolidation of Usuli clerical authority reached its fullest expression in the doctrine of Vilayat al-Faqih, through which the Supreme Leader exercises overarching religious and political authority.

== Rejection of the Mujtahids ==
Akhbaris reject the authority of mujtahids. Their position is based in part on the final letter that Imām al-Mahdi is said to have sent to ‘Alī ibn Muhammad, the fourth trusted representative during the Lesser Occultation. In this letter, the Imām stated:

If someone claims himself as deputy of the Imam during the occultation, he is a liar—ousted from Allah’s religion and calumniating Allah. He has gone astray and leads others astray. He will always be in loss. May the curse of mine, of Allah, of Allah’s Messenger (SW), and of his Progeny (AS) be upon him at every moment and in all circumstances.

Akhbaris also maintain that only the Imāms may be described as āyat Allah (Ayatollahs, “signs of God”), basing this view on the Hadith-e-Tariq. According to this narration:

O Tariq, the Imām (as) is the Kalama-t-Allāh [Word of God], Waj'ha-t-Allāh [Face of God], Hijaba-t-Allāh [Veil of God], Nūru-Allah [Light of God], and Āya-t-Allah [Sign of God].

Akhbaris therefore argue that no one other than the Imāms has the right to use this divinely conferred title. Historically, it was only in the early 19th century that ordinary mujtahids began referring to themselves as “Ayatollahs.”

== Notable Akhbari scholars ==
- Muhammad ibn Yaʿqūb al-Kulaynī
- ʿAbdullāh ibn Ṣāliḥ al-Samāhījī
- Mohsen Fayz Kashani
- Muḥammad Baqer Majlesi
- Aliqoli Jadid-ol-Eslam
- Abgar Ali Akbar Armani
- Mohsen Fayz Kashani
- Sayyid Hashim al-Bahrani
- Nematollah Jazayeri
- Al-Hurr al-Amilī Akhbārī
- Mirza Ḥusayn Nūrī Tabarsi
- Mirza Muhammad al-Akhbari
- Muhammad Amin al-Astarabadi
- Salih Al-Karzakani
- Yusuf al-Bahrani
- Mohsen Fayz Kashani
- Husayn al-Asfour
- Muhsin al-Asfour
- Muhammad Amin Zayn al-Din
- Muhammad Ridha Chaleh-Hasari

== See also ==
- Ahl al-Hadith

== Bibliography ==
- Rival Empires of Trade and Imami Shiism in Eastern Arabia, 1300-1800, Juan Cole, International Journal of Middle East Studies, Vol. 19, No. 2, (May 1987), pp. 177–203
- Andrew J. Newman, The Nature of the Akhbārī/Uṣūlī Dispute in Late Ṣafawid Iran. Part 1: 'Abdallāh al-Samāhijī's "Munyat al-Mumārisīn Bulletin of the School of Oriental and African Studies, University of London, Vol. 55, No. 1 (1992), pp. 22–51
- Killing of Prophet Muhammad's daughter
- Gleave, Robert (2007). Scripturalist Islam : The History and Doctrines of the Akhbārī Shīʿī School. Brill. ISBN 978-90-474-2162-7.
