= Ja'fari school =

Pre-eminent legal school in Shia Islam

The Jaʿfarī school, (Note: In Arabic script: جعفري, strict transcriptions: Jaʻfarī or Ǧaʿfarī, /d͡ʒaʕfariː/; from the name: جعفر, Jaʻfar/Ǧaʿfar, /d͡ʒaʕfar/) also known as the Jafarite school, Jaʿfarī fiqh (Arabic: الفقه الجعفري) or Ja'fari jurisprudence, is a prominent school of jurisprudence (fiqh) within Twelver and Ismaili (including Nizari) Shia Islam, named after the sixth Imam, Ja'far al-Sadiq. In Iran, Jaʽfari jurisprudence is enshrined in the constitution, shaping various aspects of governance, legislation, and judiciary in the country. In Lebanon, this school of jurisprudence is also accounted for in the legal system of the country and Shia Muslims can call upon it for their legal disputes. During the French Mandate in Lebanon and after independence, Jaʿfarī jurisprudence became institutionalized through Jaʿfarī courts, where legal practice reflected not only religious doctrine but also citizenship, gender, and state authority. It was on January 27, 1926 when the Ja'fari school was formally recognised by the Lebanese state, after the recognition of the Shi'a community as independent and leading to the approval of Ja'fari personal status law. Consequently, Ja'fari courts became established across Lebanon, with courts of first instance in regional centres, and a central appellate court located in Beirut. While Ja'fari jurisprudence was initially established in relation to Lebanese citizens as it was recognised by this state, its use across state borders became popular as many followers of the Ja'fari madhhab claimed adherence to the court. During the Mandate Period, foreign Ja'fari individuals appealed to these courts with the hope of overturning rulings from alternative courts in nearby countries.

It differs from the predominant madhhabs of Sunni jurisprudence in its reliance on ijtihad, as well as on matters of inheritance, religious taxes, commerce, personal status, and the allowing of temporary marriage or mut'ah. Since 1959, Jaʿfari jurisprudence has been afforded the status of "fifth school" along with the four Sunni schools by Azhar University. In addition, it is one of the eight recognized madhhabs listed in the Amman Message of 2004 by King Abdullah II of Jordan, and since endorsed by Sadiq al-Mahdi, former Prime Minister of Sudan. Historically, Ja'fari and Sunni Hanafi courts were alternatively and strategically appealed to, depending on the jurisprudence that would favour the litigants' claims in regards to issues of personal status law. This was particularly done by women, for instance, in divorce cases, for which Ja'fari courts required stricter conditions.

== Branches ==
Ja'fari among other Shia branches (in green)

=== Usuli ===
This school of thought utilizes ijtihad by adopting reasoned argumentation in finding the laws of Islam. Usulis emphasize the role of Mujtahid who was capable of independently interpreting the sacred sources as an intermediary of the Hidden Imam and thus serves the community as a guide. This meant that legal interpretations were kept flexible to take account of changing conditions and the dynamics of the times. This school of thought is predominant among most Shia Muslims.

Ayatollah Ruhollah Khomeini emphasized that Ja'fari jurisprudence is configured based on the recognition that epistemology is influenced by subjectivity. Accordingly, Ja'fari jurisprudence asserts Conventional Fiqh (objective) and Dynamic Fiqh (subjective). Through Dynamic Fiqh, discussed in the famous text by Javaher-al-Kalem (Arabic: جواهر الكلم), one must consider the concept of time, era, and age (Arabic: زمان) as well as the concept of place, location and venue (Arabic: مکان) since these dimensions of thought and reality affect the process of interpreting, understanding and extracting meaning from the commandments.

=== Akhbari ===
This school of thought takes a restrictive approach to ijtihad. This school has almost died out now; very few followers are left. Some neo-Akhbaris have emerged in the Indian subcontinent, but they do not belong to the old Akhbari movement of Bahrain.

== Legal status ==
Prior to the 20th century, Shi'i Muslims under Ottoman governance were not recognised as a distinct legal community and were required to adhere to Sunni Hanafi state courts for personal status matters and official legal disputes.

=== 1926 Legal recognition ===
On January 27, 1926, during the French Mandate, the state issued a formal decree recognising the Shi'a as an independent religious community and sanctioning the Ja'farī school as their official personal status law. This led to the creation of a dedicated legal court system, consisting of two tiers, with the first instance regional centers and a central court in Beirut.

== Components ==
=== Bada' ===
Many contemporary Twelvers are described as rejecting predestination. This belief is further emphasized by the Shia concept of Bada', which states that God has not set a definite course for human history. Instead, God may alter the course of human history as is seen to be fit (Although some academics insist that Bada' is not rejection of predestination.).

=== Nikah Mut'ah ===
Nikaḥ mut'ah (Arabic: نكاح المتعة)," is a type of marriage used in Twelver Shia Islam, where the duration of the marriage and the dower must be specified and agreed upon in advance. It is a private contract made in a verbal or written format. In practice, the regulation and recognition of nikāḥ mutʿah have varied across time and place, particularly in modern legal systems where Jaʿfarī courts operate alongside state law, shaping how such contracts are registered or contested. A declaration of the intent to marry and an acceptance of the terms are required (as they are in nikah). Zaidi Shias, Ismaili Shias, and Sunni Muslims do not practice nikah mut'ah.

=== Taqiyah ===
In Shia Islam, taqiyah (تقیة taqiyyah/taqīyah) is a form of religious veil, or a legal dispensation whereby a believing individual can deny his faith or commit otherwise illegal or blasphemous acts, especially while they are in fear or at risk of significant persecution. One source for this understanding comes from al-Kafi.

This practice was emphasized in Shi'a Islam whereby adherents may conceal their religion when they are under threat, persecution, or compulsion. Taqiyya was developed to protect Shi'as who were usually in minority and under pressure, and Shia Muslims as the persecuted minority have taken recourse to dissimulation from the time of the mihna (persecution) under Al-Ma'mun in the 9th century, while the politically dominant Sunnites rarely found it necessary to resort to dissimulation. Scholars note that the use and significance of taqiyah have varied historically and contextually, shaped by shifting political conditions rather than constituting a fixed or universal practice among Shia communities.

== See also ==
- Outline of Islam
- Shia clergy
- The four schools of Sunni jurisprudence
  - Hanafi
  - Hanbali
  - Maliki
  - Shafi'i

== Sources ==
- McLean, Iain; McMillan, Alistair, eds. (2003). The Oxford Concise Dictionary of Politics (2nd ed.). Oxford; New York: Oxford University Press. ISBN 0-19-280276-3. OCLC 464816415.
