= Usulism =

School in Twelver Shia Islam

Usulism (Arabic: الأصولية, romanized: al-ʾUṣūliyya; from أصول meaning 'foundations' or 'principles') is the majority school of Twelver Shia Islam in opposition to the minority Akhbarism. The Usulis favor the use of ijtihad (reasoning) in the creation of new rules of jurisprudence; in assessing hadith to exclude traditions they believe unreliable; and in considering it obligatory to obey a mujtahid when seeking to determine Islamically correct behavior.

Since its surpassing of the Akhbaris in the late 18th century, it has been the dominant school of Twelver Shi'a and now forms an overwhelming majority within the Twelver Shia denomination.

The name Usuli derives from the term Uṣūl al-fiqh (principles of jurisprudence). In Usuli thought, there are four valid sources of law: the Quran, hadith, ijma' and 'aql. Ijma' refers to a unanimous consensus. Aql, in Shia jurisprudence, is applied to four practical principles which are applied when other religious proofs are not applicable: bara'at (immunity), ihtiyat (recommended precautions), takhyir (selection), and istishab (the presumption of continuity in the previous state).

The term Usuli is also sometimes used to refer more generally to students of usul especially among early Muslims, without regard to Shia Islam. Students/scholars of the principles of fiqh are distinguished from scholars of fiqh itself, whose scholars are known as faqīh (plural fuqahā').

== Background ==
The Usuli believe that the Hadith collections contained traditions of varying degrees of reliability, and that critical analysis was necessary to assess their authority. In contrast, the Akhbari believe that the sole sources of law are the Qur'an and the Hadith, in particular the Four Books accepted by the Shia: everything in these sources is in principle reliable, and outside them, there was no authority competent to enact or deduce further legal rules.

In addition to assessing the reliability of the Hadith, Usuli believes the task of the legal scholar is to establish intellectual principles of general application (Usul al-fiqh), from which particular rules may be derived by way of deduction. Accordingly, Usuli legal scholarship has the tools in principle for resolving new situations that are not already addressed in Quran or Hadith (see ijtihad).

== Taqlid ==
An important tenet of Usuli doctrine is Taqlid or "imitation", i.e. the acceptance of a religious ruling in matters of worship and personal affairs from someone regarded as a higher religious authority (e.g. an 'ālim) without necessarily asking for the technical proof. These higher religious authorities can be known as a "source of imitation" (Arabic مرجع تقليد marja taqlid, Persian marja) or less exaltedly as an "imitated one" (Arabic مقلَد muqallad). However, his verdicts are not to be taken as the only source of religious information and he can be always corrected by other muqalladeen (the plural of muqallad) which come after him. Obeying a deceased muqallad is forbidden in Usuli.

Taqlid has been introduced by scholars who felt that alongside Quranic verses and traditions like ahadith the use of ijtihad should also be highly used and that ulama were needed not only to interpret the Quran and Sunna but also use reasoning and therefore "new rulings to respond to new challenges and push the boundaries of Shia law in new directions."

== History ==
By their debates and books, Al-Mufid, Sayyid-al Murtada, and Shaykh al-Tusi in Iraq were the first to introduce the Uṣūl al-fiqh (principles of Islamic jurisprudence) under the influence of the Shafe'i and Mu'tazili doctrines. Al-Kulayni, in Rey, and al-Sadduq, in Qom, were concerned with a traditionalist approach. The second wave of the Usuli was shaped in the Mongol period when al-Hilli introduced the term mujtahid, meaning an individual qualified to deduce ordinances on the basis of authentic religious arguments. By developing the theory of the usul, al-Hilli introduced more legal and logical norms which extended the meaning of the usul beyond the four principal sources. Amili was the first scholar to fully formulate the principles of ijtihad.

These traditional principles of Shi'a jurisprudence were challenged by the 17th-century Akhbari school, led by Muhammad Amin al-Astarabadi. A reaction against Akhbari arguments was led in the last half of the 18th century by Mohammad Bagher Shafti and Muhammad Baqir Behbahani. He attacked the Akhbari and their method was abandoned by Shia. The dominance of the Usuli over the Akhbari came when Behbahani led the Usuli to dominance and "completely routed the Akhbaris at Karbala and Najaf", so that "only a handful of Shi'i ulama have remained Akhbari to the present day."

== See also ==
- Marja'
- List of maraji
