= Al-Nawbakhti =

Al-Nawbakhti (Arabic: ٱلنَّوْبَخْتِيّ, an-Nawbakhtīy; Persian: نوبختی, Nowbakhtī, meaning "Rebirth" or "Good Luck"), is the Persian surname of several notable figures in Islamic, especially Shia Islamic, theology, philosophy and science. Several variations include Nawbakht, Nūbukht, Nibakht, Naybakht and Ibn Nawbakht. Many members of the Nawbakht family, or clan (Banu Nawbakht), distinguished themselves in the science of the stars and made decisive contributions to the development of the Twelver Shia faith at a time of confusion following the Minor Occultation of the 12th Imam.The clan's theological accomplishments include the formal integration of Mutazila rationalist doctrine into Twelver Shi'ism, explaining the Occultation and defending it against Shia doubters, developing the Imamate doctrine (with emphasis upon such qualities as infallibility) and to lay the groundwork for the authority of the Twelver scholars over their communities.

== Nawbakhtī Family ==
1. Naubakht (Nūbukht), a Persian astrologer at the Abbasid court of al-Manṣūr.
  1. Abū Sahl, Timādh, his son.
2. Al-Ḥasan ibn Sahl ibn Naubakht.
3. Abu Sahl al-Fadl ibn Naubakht son of Naubakht al-Farisi. A physician and astronomer at the court of al-Rashīd.
4. Abu Muhammad al-Hasan ibn Musa al-Nawbakhti. A famous Shia scholar and theologian. Best known for his book Firaq al-Shia (The Branches of Shia). Founder of Imami kalam together with his uncle Abu Sahl Isma'il ibn Ali al-Nawbakhti.
5. Abu Sahl Isma'il ibn Ali al-Nawbakhti. A scholar of Shia Islam and leader of the Imāmīyah (d. 311 AH./923-24 AD). Founder of Imami kalam together with his nephew Abu Muhammad al-Hasan ibn Musa Al-Nawbakhti.
6. Abu al-Qasim al-Husayn ibn Ruh al-Nawbakhti. The third deputy of the Imam al-Mahdi in Twelver Shia Islam.

== See also ==
- Naubakht
- Al-Nawbakhti Shrine
