= Naubakht =

Medieval Persian astrologer

Nobakht the Persian also known as Nowbakht-i Ahvazi (Persian: نوبخت اهوازى), also spelled Naubakht and Naubakht, along with his sons were Persian astrologers from Ahvaz (in the present-day Khuzestan province, Iran) who lived in the 8th and 9th centuries AD.

Nobakht was particularly famous for having led a group of astrologers who picked an auspicious electional chart for the founding of Baghdad. His family also helped design the city. Originally Zoroastrians, Nobakht and his sons converted to Islam and were employed as Pahlavi translators of the Abbasid court.

== Life as a court astrologer ==
Nawbakht was the most prominent among 'Abbasid caliph al-Mansur's court astrologers. He rose to this position after having successfully predicted al-Mansur's rise to power as a caliph. There were other astrologers retained at the court, including Mashallah (d. ca. 199/815 or 204/820) who aided Nawbakht in his analysis of the stars in determining ”the most auspicious date and time for the foundation of the new capital, the round city of Madīnat al-Salām ("The City of Peace")”, historically known as Baghdad.

While part of al-Mansur’s court, Nawbakht is said to have correctly predicted the caliph’s victory over Ibrahim b. 'Abdallah who, along with his brother, had rebelled against the 'Abbasid rule. In addition to al-Mansur’s victory, Nawbakht predicted the death of Ibrahim as well. Reportedly, Nawbakht was so confident in the accuracy of his calculations that he volunteered to be imprisoned until the outcome of the encounter between Ibrahim and the 'Abbasid army was reported, and agreed to being executed should he had been mistaken.

It’s suspected that part of Nawbakht’s career included translating scientific works from Pahlavi into Arabic, and the Risāla fī sarāʾir aḥkām al-nujūm ("A treatise on the secrets of astrology", an unpublished manuscript) is attributed to him although this attribution remains unconfirmed.

Al-Mansur gifted the astrologer with 2,000 jeribs of land south of Baghdad as an eqta' (grants of land given by a caliph in exchange for service).

== Descendants ==
In addition to being known as an influential 'Abbasid astrologer, Nawbakht is known as a father and ancestor to a very successful family under 'Abbasid rule and as part of the court – various sources refer to Nawbakht as the progenitor of a lineage of court astrologers, thus successfully elevating his family's position in the 'Abbasid court.

According to Sean Anthony, Nawbakht's accumulation of wealth and social status placed his family in such a position that they would go on to become notorious for patronizing and entertaining intellectuals of 'Abbasid society.

Some notable members of this family are:

- Abū Sahl al-Faḍl ibn Nawbakht – Nawbakht's immediate successor as a court astrologer for al-Mansur, Abu Sahl is known to have also worked as a translator in the Ḵezānat al-ḥekma (Treasury of wisdom) of one of al-Mansur's successors, Hārun al-Rašid. Three of Abu Sahl's sons, 'Abdallah, Esma’il, and Abu’l-Abbas Fazl, all also served as court astrologers for al-Ma’mun and were patrons of the poet Abu Nowas and it was the Nawbakhti family that preserved much of his poetry.
- Abū Sahl Ismāʿīl ibn ʿAlī – the first of Nawbakht's descendants that can decisively be determined as contributing to Shi’ite doctrine. Abu Sahl was a prominent theologian of Imami Shi’ism, and while the family is known for their loyalty to and influence on Twelver Shi’ism, the family's relationship to the sect are difficult to discern prior to Abu Sahl's contributions.
- al-Ḥasan ibn Mūsā – nephew of Abu Sahl, also a Shi’ite theologian as well as a philosopher and astronomer.
- Abu’l-Qāsem Ḥosayn ibn Ruḥ ibn Abi Baḥr Nawbaḵti – perhaps the most politically prominent member of the Nawbakhti family, ibn Ruh became the third safir or deputy of the twelfth Imam.

== Sources ==
- Labarta, Ana (2021). "Nawbakht". In Fleet, Kate; Krämer, Gudrun; Matringe, Denis; Nawas, John; Rowson, Everett (eds.). Encyclopaedia of Islam (3rd ed.). Brill Online. ISSN 1873-9830.
- The Golden Age of Persia, by Richard Nelson Frye, p. 163.
- Khandan-i Naubakhti, by Abbas Iqbal, Tehran, 1933, pp 2–3 & 13.
- Islamic Science and Engineering, by Donald Hill, p. 10.
