= Al-Nawbakhti Shrine =

Twelver Shi'ite mausoleum in Baghdad, Iraq

- مقام النوبختي
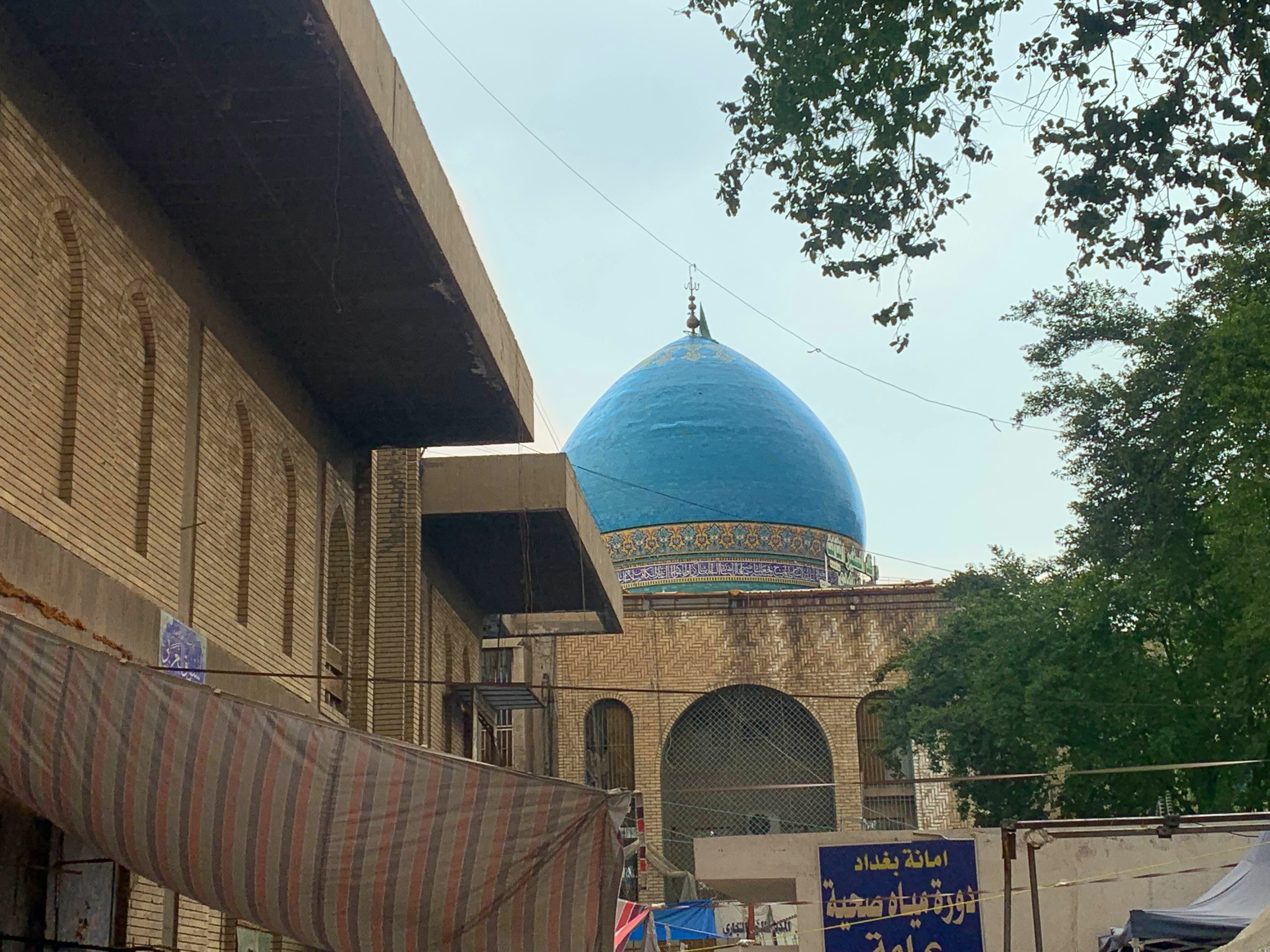
- The shrine in 2025

Religion
- Affiliation: Shia (Twelver)
- Ecclesiastical or organizational status: Shrine; Mosque
- Status: Active

Location
- Location: al-Rusafa, Baghdad, Baghdad Governorate
- Country: Iraq

Architecture
- Type: Islamic architecture
- Completed: 10th century (shrine)

Specifications
- Dome: One
- Shrine: One: Ibn Ruh al-Nawbakhti

The Al-Nawbakhti Shrine (Arabic: مقام النوبختي) is a Twelver Shi'ite mausoleum and mosque, located in the al-Rusafa district of the city of Baghdad, in the Baghdad Governorate of Iraq. The site is the resting place of the third Twelver Deputy Ibn Ruh al-Nawbakhti, who died in 937 CE. A dome tops the building and is also a place for ziyarat. It is located between the markets of the Shorja and al-Rashid Street.

== Historical background ==
Ibn Ruh al-Nawbakhti was an influential figure around his time, part of the Abbasid court, leader of al-Nawbakhti family, and a close associate of the second Twelver Deputy Abu Ja'far Muhammad, who he would succeed as the third Twelver Deputy to the hidden 12th Imam al-Mahdi in 917 CE. His contact with the 12th Imam would resume until 937 CE, the year he would die and be succeeded by Abu al-Husayn al-Samarri as the fourth and finale Twelver Deputy. Al-Nawbakhti was buried in Baghdad.

== See also ==
- Shia Islam in Iraq
- List of mosques in Iraq
- Minor Occultation
