= The Fourteen Infallibles =

Muhammad, Fatima, and the Twelve Imams in Twelver Shia Islam

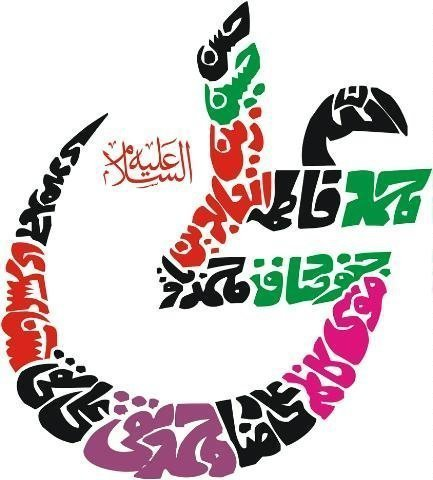
Stylized rendition of the names of the 14 infallibles

The Fourteen Infallibles (Arabic: ٱلْمَعْصُومُون ٱلْأَرْبَعَة عَشَر, romanized: al-Maʿṣūmūn al-Arbaʿa ʿAshar; Persian: چهارده معصوم, Chahārdah Maʿṣūm) in Twelver Shia Islam are the Islamic prophet Muhammad, his daughter Fatima al-Zahra, and the Twelve Imams. They are regarded as infallible under the theological doctrine of Ismah, meaning that they are believed to be divinely protected from error and sin. According to Twelver theology, the Fourteen Infallibles possess exceptional knowledge and moral purity and serve as authoritative guides in matters of religion. Their words and deeds are regarded as important sources for understanding and interpreting Islam, alongside the Quran and the teachings of Muhammad (Sunnah).

== Family tree ==
Muhammad (مُحَمَّد)
Fatimah (فَاطِمَة)	Ali (عَلِيّ)
Hasan (ٱلْحَسَن)	Husayn (ٱلْحُسَيْن)
Ali Zayn al-Abideen (عَلِيّ زَيْن ٱلْعَابِدِين)
Muhammad al-Baqir (مُحَمَّد ٱلْبَاقِر)
Ja'far al-Sadiq (جَعْفَر ٱلصَّادِق)
Musa al-Kazim (مُوسَىٰ ٱلْكَاظِم)
Ali al-Rida (عَلِيّ ٱلرِّضَا)
Muhammad al-Jawad (مُحَمَّد ٱلْجَوَّاد)
Ali al-Hadi (عَلِيّ ٱلْهَادِي)
Hasan al-Askari (ٱلْحَسَن ٱلْعَسْكَرِيّ)
Hujjat Allah al-Mahdi (حُجَّة ٱللَّٰه ٱلْمَهْدِيّ)

== List of the Infallibles ==
Name Kunya	Title Arabic	Date of birth and death: CE; AH (Note: The abbreviation CE refers to the Common Era solar calendar, while AH refers to the Islamic Hijri lunar calendar) Place of birth	Importance	Cause and place of death Place of burial (Note: Except the Twelfth Imam)
Muhammad ibn Abdullah مُحَمَّد ٱبْن عَبْد ٱللَّٰه صَلَّىٰ ٱللَّٰهُ عَلَيْهِ وَآلِهِ Abu al-Qasim أَبُو ٱلْقَاسِم	Rasūl Allāh (رَسُول ٱللَّٰه) (Messenger of God); Khātam al-ʾAnbiyāʾ (خَاتَم ٱلْأَنْبِیَاء) (Seal of the Prophets); al-Muṣṭafā (ٱلْمُصْطَفَىٰ) (The Chosen)	570 – 632; 53 BH–10; Makkah, Hijaz	Considered by Muslims to be the last prophet sent by God to mankind. According to Muslims, God revealed to him the Quran, which is God's word.	Fell ill and died in Madinah. According to some Shi'as and fewer Sunnis, he was fatally poisoned instead, with the exact circumstances being disputed between them. Buried in Madinah, Hijaz.
Fatimah bint Muhammad فَاطِمَة ٱبْنَت مُحَمَّد عَلَيْهَا ٱلسَّلَام ʾUmm ʾAbīhā أُمّ أَبِیهَا	az-Zahrāʾ (ٱلزَّهْرَاء) (The Luminous); Sayyidat Nisā Ahl Al Jannahʾ (سَیِّدَة نساء اهل الجنة) (The Chief of the Women of Heaven); al-Batūl (ٱلْبَتُول) (The Chaste); aṭ-Ṭāhirah (ٱلطَّاهِرَة) (The Pure); aṣ-Ṣiddīqah (ٱلصِّدِّیقَة) (The Honest)	615 – 633; 8 BH– 11; Makkah, Hijaz	Her father Muhammad called her "a part of me". She is also regarded as "the mother of the Imams".	According to most Shias, Fatimah suffered a fatal injury while defending Ali against the first Sunni caliph. The exact location of her grave is unknown but is believed to be in Madinah.
Ali ibn Abi Talib عَلِيّ ٱبْن أَبِي طَالِب عَلَيْهِ ٱلسَّلَام Abu al-Hasan أَبُو ٱلْحَسَن	ʾAmīr al-Muʾminīn (أَمِير ٱلْمُؤْمِنِين) (Commander of the Faithful); al-Murtaḍā (ٱلْمُرْتَضَىٰ) (The Beloved); al-Waṣīy (ٱلْوَصِيّ) (The Successor); al-Walīy (ٱلْوَلِيّ) (The Wali)	600 – 661; 22 or 16 BH – 40 AH; Makkah, Hijaz	Cousin and son-in-law of Muhammad. According to Twelver Shia belief, he was the only person to have been born in the Ka'bah, the holiest site in Islam, and the first male to openly accept Islam. Considered by Shia Islam as the rightful Successor of Muhammad. Sunnis also acknowledge him as the fourth Caliph. He holds a high position in almost all Sufi tariqa (religious orders); members of these orders trace their lineage to Muhammad through Ali.	Assassinated by Abd al-Rahman ibn Muljam, a Kharijite, in Kufa, Iraq, who struck his head with a poisoned sword while he was in prostration praying on the Night of Qadr in the month of Ramadan. Buried at the Imam Ali Mosque in Najaf, Iraq, 10 kilometres (6.2 mi) southwest of the place of his assassination in Kufa.
Hasan ibn Ali ٱلْحَسَن ٱبْن عَلِيّ عَلَيْهِ ٱلسَّلَام Abu Muhammad أَبُو مُحَمَّد	al-Mujtabā (ٱلْمُجْتَبَىٰ) (The Chosen); Sibṭ an-Nabīy (سِبْط ٱلنَّبِيّ) (Grandson of the Prophet)	625 – 670; 3 – 50; Madinah, Hijaz	The eldest surviving grandson of Muhammad, through his mother, Fatimah, Hasan succeeded his father Ali as the caliph in Kufa; but after a seven-month reign he relinquished control of Iraq following a peace treaty with Muawiya I.	He was poisoned fatally by his wife in Madinah by order of Caliph Muawiya. Buried in Jannat al-Baqi, Madinah.
Husayn ibn Ali ٱلْحُسَيْن ٱبْن عَلِيّ عَلَيْهِ ٱلسَّلَام Abu Abdillah أَبُو عَبْد ٱللَّٰه	Sayyid ash-Shuhadāʾ (سَيِّد ٱلشُّهَدَاء) (Master of the Martyrs); al-Maẓlūm (ٱلْمَظْلُوم) (The Tyrannized); Sibṭ an-Nabīy (سِبْط ٱلنَّبِيّ) (Grandson of the Prophet)	626 – 680; 4 – 61; Madinah, Hijaz	Grandson of Muhammad and younger brother of Hasan, Husayn rejected the legitimacy of Caliph Yazid I, the son of Muawiyah. As a result, he and his family were killed in the Battle of Karbala by Yazid's forces. Ever since the battle, the commemoration of Husayn ibn Ali's martyrdom has been at the core of Shia rituals and identity.	Killed and beheaded at the Battle of Karbala. Buried at the Imam Husayn Shrine, Karbala, Iraq.
Ali ibn Husayn عَلِيّ ٱبْن ٱلْحُسَيْن ٱلسَّجَّاد عَلَيْهِ ٱلسَّلَام Abu Muhammad أَبُو مُحَمَّد	as-Sajjād (ٱلسَّجَّاد) (The Consistently Prostrating); Zayn al-ʿĀbidīn (زَيْن ٱلْعَابِدِين) (Ornament of the Worshippers)	658/59 – 712; 38– 95; Madinah, Hijaz	The author of the prayers in Al-Sahifa al-Sajjadiyya, ("The Scripture of Al-Sajjad", "The Psalm of the Household of the Prophet").	He was fatally poisoned by order of Caliph al-Walid I in Madinah. Buried in Jannat al-Baqi, Madinah.
Muhammad ibn Ali مُحَمَّد ٱبْن عَلِيّ ٱلْبَاقِر عَلَيْهِ ٱلسَّلَام Abu Ja'far أَبُو جَعْفَر	Bāqir al-ʿUlūm (بَاقِر ٱلْعُلُوم) (The Opener of Knowledge)	677 – 732; 57 – 114; Madinah, Hijaz	Sunni and Shia sources consider Al-Baqir an early and pre-eminent legal scholar who was revered for having educated many students.	He was fatally poisoned by Ibrahim ibn Walid ibn 'Abdallah in Madinah by order of Caliph Hisham ibn Abd al-Malik. Buried in Jannat al-Baqi, Madinah
Ja'far ibn Muhammad جَعْفَر ٱبْن مُحَمَّد ٱلصَّادِق عَلَيْهِ ٱلسَّلَام Abu Abdillah أَبُو عَبْد ٱللَّٰه	aṣ-Ṣādiq (ٱلصَّادِق) (The Honest)	702 – 765; 83 – 148; Madinah, Hijaz	As-Sadiq established the Ja'fari school of jurisprudence and developed the theology of the Twelvers. He taught many scholars in different fields, including Abu Hanifah and Malik ibn Anas in fiqh, Wasil ibn Ata and Hisham ibn Hakam in Islamic theology, and Geber in science and alchemy.	He was fatally poisoned in Madinah by order of Caliph Al-Mansur. Buried in Jannat al-Baqi, Madinah
Musa ibn Ja'far مُوسَىٰ ٱبْن جَعْفَر ٱلْكَاظِم عَلَيْهِ ٱلسَّلَام Abu al-Hasan I أَبُو ٱلْحَسَن ٱلْأَوَّل	al-Kāẓim (ٱلْكَاظِم) (The Confined)	744 – 799; 128 – 183; Madinah, Hijaz	Al-Kazim was leader of the Shia community during the schism between the Ismaili and other branches of Islam after the death of the previous Imam Jafar al-Sadiq. He established a network of agents who collected the khums in the Shia community of the Middle East and the Greater Khorasan. He holds a high position in the Mahdavia, the members of which trace their lineage to Muhammad through him.	He was imprisoned and fatally poisoned in Baghdad, Iraq, by order of Caliph Harun al-Rashid. Buried in the Kazimayn shrine, Baghdad, Iraq
Ali ibn Musa عَلِيّ ٱبْن مُوسَىٰ ٱلرِّضَا عَلَيْهِ ٱلسَّلَام Abu al-Hasan II أَبُو ٱلْحَسَن ٱلثَّانِي	ar-Riḍā (ٱلرِّضَا) (The Pleasing)	765 – 817; 148 – 203; Madinah, Hijaz	Made crown prince by Caliph Al-Ma'mun, Ar-Rida was known for his discussions and debates with both Muslim and non-Muslim religious scholars.	He was fatally poisoned in Mashad, Iran, by order of Caliph Al-Ma'mun. Buried in the Imam Reza shrine, Mashad, Iran
Muhammad ibn Ali مُحَمَّد ٱبْن عَلِيّ ٱلْجَوَّاد عَلَيْهِ ٱلسَّلَام Abu Ja'far أَبُو جَعْفَر	al-Jawwād (ٱلْجَوَّاد) (The Generous); at-Taqīy (ٱلتَّقِيّ) (The God-Fearing)	809 or 810 – 835; 195 – 220; Madinah, Hijaz	Al-Jawad was known for his generosity and piety in the face of persecution by the Abbasid caliphate.	He was fatally poisoned by his wife, the daughter of Caliph Al-Ma'mun, in Baghdad, Iraq, by order of Caliph Al-Mu'tasim. Buried in the Kazmain shrine, Baghdad, Iraq.
Ali ibn Muhammad عَلِيّ ٱبْن مُحَمَّد ٱلْهَادِي عَلَيْهِ ٱلسَّلَام Abu al-Hasan III أَبُو ٱلْحَسَن ٱلثَّالِث	al-Hādī (ٱلْهَادِي) (The Guide); an-Naqīy (ٱلنَّقِيّ) (The Pure)	828 – 868; 212 – 254; Surayya, a village near Madinah, Hijaz	Al-Naqi taught religious sciences until 243/857. He strengthened the network of deputies in the Shia community. He sent them instructions and in turn received financial contributions from the faithful, from the khums and religious vows.	He was fatally poisoned in Samarra, Iraq, by order of caliph Al-Mu'tazz. Buried in the Al Askari Mosque, Samarra, Iraq.
Hasan ibn Ali ٱلْحَسَن ٱبْن عَلِيّ ٱلْعَسْكَرِيّ عَلَيْهِ ٱلسَّلَام Abu al-Mahdi أَبُو ٱلْمَهْدِيّ	al-ʿAskarīy (ٱلْعَسْكَرِيّ) (The Garrison Town One)	845/6 – 874; 231 – 260; Madinah, Hijaz	Like his father, Al-Askari was placed under house arrest, which would last most of his life, by the Abbasid Caliph Al-Mu'tamid. During this time, repression of the Shia communities was great because of their growing size and power.	He was fatally poisoned by order of Caliph Al-Mu'tamid in Samarra, Iraq. Buried in the Al Askari Mosque, Samarra, Iraq.
Mohammad ibn al-Hasan حُجَّة ٱللَّٰه ٱبْن ٱلْحَسَن ٱلْمَهْدِيّ عَلَيْهِ ٱلسَّلَام Abu al-Qasim أَبُو ٱلْقَاسِم	al-Mahdīy (ٱلْمَهْدِيّ) (The Guided); al-Qāʾim (ٱلْقَائِم) (The Riser); al-Ghāʾib (ٱلْغَائِب) (The Hidden); Sāhib az-Zamān (صَاحِب ٱلزَّمَان) (The Authority of the Era); Baqīyat Allah (بَقِيَّة ٱللَّٰه) (Remainder of Allah's); al-Ḥujjah ʾĀl Muḥammad (ٱلْحُجَّة آل مُحَمَّد) (The Proof of the House of Muhammad)	868 – Present; 255 or 256 – Present; Samarra, Iraq	According to Twelver Shia doctrine, he is the current Imam and the promised Mahdi, a messianic figure who will return with the prophet Isa (Jesus). He will reestablish the rightful governance of Islam and establish justice and peace in the earth.	According to Twelver Shia doctrine, he has been living in the Occultation since 872, and will continue as long as God wills.

== See also ==
- Shia Islam
- Twelvers
- Ahl al-Bayt
- Ahl al-Kisa
- Twelve Imams
- Imamat doctrine
- Ismah
- Criticism of Twelver Shia Islam#Infallibility of Imams
- Salawat

== Sources ==
Encyclopedias

- Ahmed, M. Mukarram (2005). Encyclopaedia of Islam. Anmol Publications Pvt. Ltd. ISBN 978-81-261-2339-1.
- Algar, Hamid (1990). "Chahardah M'asum". Encyclopædia Iranica.
- Amir-Moezzi, Mohammad Ali (2007). "Islam in Iran-vii. The Concept of Mahdi in Twelver Shi'ism". Encyclopædia Iranica.
- Halm, H (1987). "ʿAskari". Encyclopædia Iranica.
- Klemm (2014). "Fāṭima bt. Muḥammad". Encyclopaedia of Islam 3.
- Lammens (2012). "Fatima". Encyclopaedia of Islam. Brill Online. ISBN 978-90-04-08265-6.
- Madelung, Wilferd (1985). "'Ali b. Al-Hosayn". Encyclopædia Iranica.
- Madelung, Wilferd (1985a). "'Ali Al-Hadi". Encyclopædia Iranica.
- Madelung, Wilferd (1985b). "ʿAli Al-Reza". Encyclopædia Iranica.
- Madelung, Wilferd (1988). "Baqer, Abu Ja'far Mohammad". Encyclopædia Iranica.
- Madelung, Wilferd (2003). "Hasan ibn Ali". Encyclopædia Iranica.
- Madelung, Wilferd (2004). "Ḥosayn B.ʿAli. Life and Significance in Shi'ism". Encyclopædia Iranica.
- Mattar, Philip (2004). Encyclopedia of the Modern Middle East and North Africa. Macmillan Reference USA. ISBN 978-0-02-865772-1.
- Nasr, Seyyed Hossein (2006). "Muhammad". Encyclopædia Britannica Online. Encyclopædia Britannica, Inc.
- Nasr, Seyyed Hossein (2007). "Ali". Encyclopædia Britannica Online.
- Poonawala, I. K. (1985). "ʿAli B. Abi Ṭaleb". Encyclopædia Iranica.

Books

- Amir-Moezzi, Mohammad Ali (1994). The Divine Guide in Early Shi'ism: The Sources of Esotericism in Islam. SUNY Press. ISBN 978-0-7914-2122-2.
- Amir-Moezzi, Mohammad Ali (2011). The Spirituality of Shi'i Islam: Belief and Practices. I. B. Tauris. ISBN 978-1-84511-738-2.
- Ansariyan, Hussein (2007). Ahl Al-Bayt The Celestial Beings on the Earth. Ansariyan Publications. ISBN 978-964-438-873-6. Archived from the original on October 6, 2014.
- Chittick, William C. (1980). A Shi'ite Anthology. SUNY Press. pp. 136–140. ISBN 978-0-87395-510-2.
- Corbin, Henry (1993). History of Islamic Philosophy. Kegan Paul International in association with Islamic Publications for The Institute of Ismaili Studies. ISBN 978-0-7103-0416-2.
- Dabashi, Hamid (2006). Theology of Discontent: The Ideological Foundation of the Islamic Revolution in Iran. Transaction Publishers. ISBN 1-4128-0516-3.
- Donaldson, Dwight M. (1933). The Shi'ite Religion: A History of Islam in Persia and Irak. Burleigh Press. ISBN 978-0-404-18959-4.
- Dungersi, Mohammed Raza (1994). A Brief Biography of Hazrat Fatima (s.a.). Bilal Muslim Mission of Tanzania. OCLC 66915718.
- Dungersi, Mohammed Raza (2005). A Brief Biography of Imam Hasan al-Askari. Ansariyan Publications. ISBN 978-964-438-689-3. Archived from the original on February 20, 2015.
- Hughes, Aaron (23 April 2013). Muslim Identities: An Introduction to Islam. Columbia University Press. ISBN 978-0-231-16147-3.
- Mashita (2002). Theology, ethics and metaphysics. Hiroyuki. Routledge Curzon. ISBN 978-0-7007-1670-8.
- Mir, Mustansir (1987). "Seal of the Prophets, The". Dictionary of Qur’ānic Terms and Concepts. Garland Publishing.
- Nasr, Seyyed Hossein; Dabashi, Hamid; Nasr, Seyyed Vali Reza (1989). Expectation of the Millennium: Shi'ism in History. SUNY Press. ISBN 978-0-88706-843-0.
- Nasr, Seyyed Hossein (2013). Islamic Spirituality: Foundations. Routledge. ISBN 978-1-134-53895-9.
- Ordoni, Abu Muhammad (2009). Fatima (Sa) the Gracious. Ansariyan Publications. ISBN 978-964-438-618-3. Archived from the original on December 4, 2010.
- Qurashī, Bāqir Sharīf (2007). The life of Imām Zayn al 'Abidin (A.S.). Ansariyan Publications. ISBN 978-9644381652. Archived from the original on August 16, 2014.
- Qurashī, Bāqir Sharīf (2005). The Life of Imam Muhammad Al-Jawad. Ansariyan Publications. ISBN 978-964-438-653-4. Archived from the original on July 13, 2014.
- Rayshahri, M. Muhammadi (12 January 2008). The scale of wisdom: a compendium of Shi'a Hadith. ICAS Press. ISBN 978-1-904063-34-6.
- Rizvi, Sayyid Saeed Akhtar (1988). Imamate: The vicegerency of the Holy Prophet. Bilal Muslim Mission of Tanzania. ISBN 978-9976-956-13-9.
- Sachedina, Abdulaziz Abdulhussein (1988). The Just Ruler (al-sultān Al-ʻādil) in Shīʻite Islam: The Comprehensive Authority of the Jurist in Imamite Jurisprudence. Oxford University Press. ISBN 0-19-511915-0.
- Tabatabaei, Sayyid Mohammad Hosayn (1975). Shi'ite Islam. Translated by Sayyid Hossein Nasr. SUNY Press. ISBN 978-0-87395-390-0.
- Tabatabaei, Sayyid Mohammad Hosayn (1979). Shi'ite Islam. Translated by Seyyed Hossein Nasr. SUNY press. ISBN 978-0-87395-272-9.
- Walbridge, Linda S. (6 August 2001). The Most Learned of the Shi'a: The Institution of the Marja' Taqlid. Oxford University Press. ISBN 978-0-19-534393-9.
