= List of converts to Shia Islam =

Converts to Shia Islam or commonly known as enlightened (mustabsir) refers to people who have been sure about the justice done by Ali and his descendants as well as studying the Shia thoughts, finally convert to Shia Islam and testify the position of Muhammad prophet's family.

== From Sunni Islam ==
Edoardo Agnelli in Jumu'ah prayer in Tehran

- Malcolm Shabazz -the son of Qubilah Shabazz, the second daughter of Malcolm X and Betty Shabazz
- Kabir Bello – Nigerian football striker
- Qasim Umar Sokoto -a contributor to the Islamic Movement of Nigeria, the prayer leader and Islamic teacher in Sokoto, the Northern city of Nigeria
- Tajul Muluk -a Shia religious leader of Madura Island, Indonesia
- Edoardo Agnelli -the eldest child and only son of Gianni Agnelli, the industrialist patriarch of Fiat

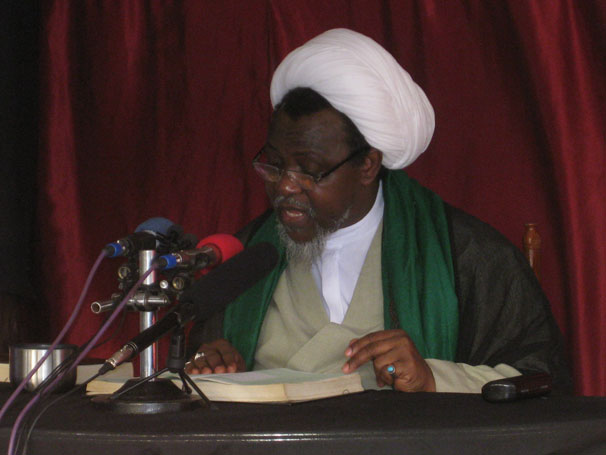
Sheikh Zakzaky

- Ibrahim Zakzaky -an outspoken and foremost Shi'a Muslim cleric in Nigeria
- Hasan Shahhata -Shi'a Muslim cleric in egypt
- Muhammad al-Tijani -a Tunisian Shia Islamic scholar, academic and theologian
- Abdullah al-Dahdouh -Shi'a Muslim cleric from Morocco
- Mujahid Abdul-Karim -an African-American convert to Islam, who is best known for his involvement and "spearheading" of the 26 April 1992 Watts Gang Truce
- Abdillahi Nassir -a Shia cleric based in Mombasa, Kenya
- Riad Al Solh -the first prime minister of Lebanon after the country's independence
- Al-Qadi al-Nu'man -an Isma'ili jurist and the official historian of the Fatimid caliphs
- Ali al-Sulayhi -the founder and sultan of the Sulayhid dynasty in Yemen
- Khvajeh Ali Safavi -great-great-grandfather of Ismail I of Persia
- Nasir Khusraw -Ismaili missionary and poet
- Öljaitü -the eighth Ilkhanid dynasty ruler from 1304 to 1316 in Tabriz
- Ali Adil Shah I -the fifth Sultan of Bijapur Sultanate
- Humayun -the second Sultan of Mughal Empire
- Rustam II -the twelfth ruler of Bavand dynasty
- Ibrahim II Sheykhshah -the fortieth ruler of Shirvan

== From Christianity ==
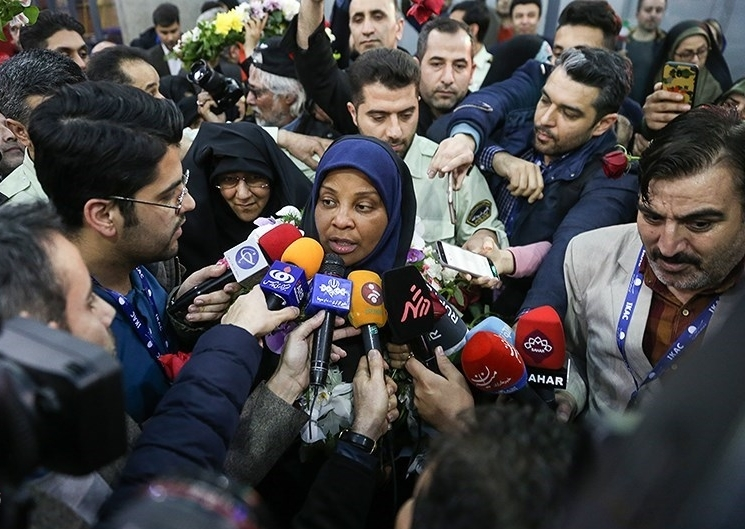
Marziah Hashemi

- Hamid Algar – scholar and convert to Shia Islam, received his PhD in oriental studies from Cambridge
- Marzieh Hashemi – an American-Iranian journalist and television presenter. She is a natural-born citizen of the United States and a naturalized citizen of the Islamic Republic of Iran
- Gary Legenhausen – an American philosopher who teaches at the Imam Khomeini Education and Research Institute
- Rebecca Masterton – a British Islamic scholar, educator, public speaker, academic, author, television presenter, and philosopher of the Shia Islam
- Christian Bonaud – (Yaḥyā Bonaud) was a French Islamologist, philosopher, writer, translator, commentator of the Qur'an in French, and a professor at the Jāmī Theological Center at Al-Mustafa International University in Iran.
- Dawud Salahuddin – American-born Iranian international terrorist and hitman.
- Claudio Mutti – Italian far-right author and essayist.
- Giafar Buttafuoco – Italian journalist and art dealer at Vienna Biennale.
- Abbas Di Palma – Italian cleric and director at Associazione Islamica Imam Mahdi Roma
- Khosrow Khan Gorji – a eunuch of Armenian origin, who became an influential figure in Qajar Iran
- Qarachaqay Khan – a military commander in Safavid Iran of Armenian origin
- Shemavon of Agulis – an Iranian official of Armenian origin.
- Khosrow Soltan Armani – a 17th-century Safavid official, military commander, and gholam of Armenian origin
- Allahverdi Khan – an Iranian general and statesman of Georgian origin
- Amir Beg Armani – a 17th-century Safavid official, courtier, and gholam of Armenian origin
- Aliqoli Jadid-ol-Eslam (António de Jesus) – a Portuguese theologian from 17th century
- Mahdi Agnelli – Italian Businessman.
- Henry Corbin – French Philosopher, privately converted according to personal friend Muhammad Husayn Tabatabai.
- Abgar Ali Akbar Armani – A 17th-century Safavid writer of Armenian origin. He wrote a conversion narrative in Persian, called 'I'tirāf-nāma' ("Confession Book").
- Badr al-Jamali – An 11th-century Fatimid military commander and statesman under Caliph al-Mustansir of Armenian origin
- Abu al-Fath Manuchihr Khan – A Safavid official and gholam of Armenian origin.

=== From Eastern Orthodoxy ===
- Abdullah Beg of Kartli – a Georgian royal prince (batonishvili) of the House of Mukhrani of the Bagrationi dynasty
- Anduqapar Amilakhvari
- Bijan Beg Saakadze
- Constantine I of Kakheti
- David XI
- Heraclius I of Kakheti
- Parsadan Gorgijanidze
- Jesse of Kakheti
- Manuchehr Khan Gorji
- Simon I of Kartli
- Siyavosh Beg
- Iase Tushi
- Vakhtang V

== Others ==
- Fábio Carvalho – a Brazilian–Portuguese goalkeeper who last played for Esteghlal Khuzestan in Iran Pro League
- Bruce Conde – a US Army officer, stamp collector, royal imposter, and a general for Royalist forces during the North Yemen Civil War
- Dagoberto Hussein Bellucci – Italian far-right journalist and essayist formerly at Avanguardia, affiliated with Hezbollah.
- Antonio Inoki – Japanese wrestler, converted from Buddhism.
- Ibrahim Tatsuichi Sawada – Japanese cleric and father of Ibrahim Sawada Jr., also a cleric, converted from Buddhism.
- Abdul Kadir (politician)
- Samir Kuntar
- Leila Rajabi
- Sean Stone
- Bahmanyar
- Al-Fadl ibn Sahl
- Al-Hasan ibn Sahl
- Ya'qub ibn Killis
- Abu'l-Hasan Mihyar al-Daylami
- Begum Om Habibeh Aga Khan

== See also ==
- List of converts to Islam
- Twelver
- Shia Islam
