= Al-Fadl ibn Naubakht =

8th century Persian scholar

- Born: fl. 8th century

Academic work
- Era: Islamic Golden Age
- Main interests: scholar

Al-Fazl or Al-Fadl ibn Naubakht, (also written Nowbakht), was an 8th century Persian scholar.

== Life ==
Al-Fadl ibn Naubakht was the son of Naubakht, a former Zoroastrian, who had designed the House of Wisdom. He was appointed as a scholar at the court of caliph Harun al-Rashid.

== Sources ==
- Anthony, Sean W. (2013). "Nawbaḵti Family". Encyclopædia Iranica.
- Wani, Zahid Ashraf; Maqbol, Tabasum (2012). "The Islamic Era and Its Importance to Knowledge and the Development of Libraries". Library Philosophy and Practice. Lincoln, Nebraska: University of Nebraska–Lincoln. ISSN 1522-0222. Archived from the original (PDF) on August 13, 2020.
- Winston, Robert, ed. (2013). Timelines of Science: The Ultimate Visual Guide to the Discoveries That Shaped the World. New York: Dorling Kindersley. ISBN 978-1-4654-2123-4.
