= Ismah =

Concept in Islamic theology

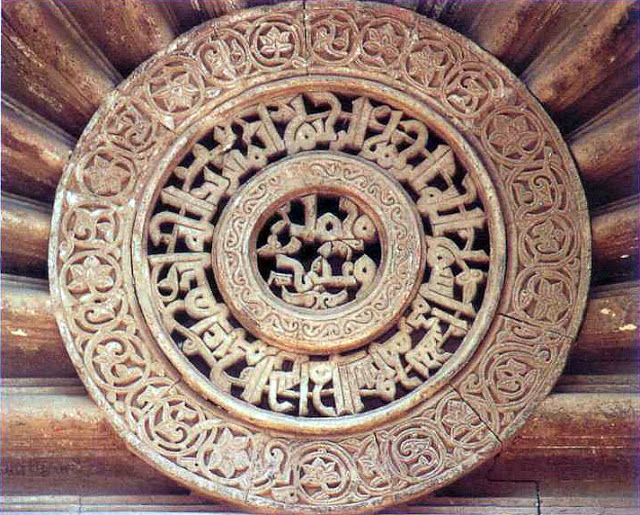
A Fatimid medallion depicting the Purity of Ahl al Bayt

‘Iṣmah or ‘Isma (Arabic: عِصْمَة; literally, "protection") is the concept of incorruptible innocence, immunity from sin, or moral infallibility in Islamic theology, and which is especially prominent in Shia Islam. In Shia theology, ismah is characteristic of prophets, imams, and angels. When attributed to human beings, ismah means "the ability of avoiding acts of disobedience, in spite of having the power to commit them". Along with a pure constitution, excellent qualities, firmness against opponents, and tranquility (as-Sakinah), ismah is a divine grace bestowed by God.

An infallible (ma'sum) is someone who is free from error in leading people to belief, in perceiving divine knowledge, and in practical matters. Prophets must be immune from all errors and sins in order to perform their mission of upholding and promoting the divine religion, interpreting the Qur'an, and establishing a wholesome social system.

According to Twelver Shi'ism, the Fourteen Infallibles (ma'sumun) "divinely bestowed free from error and sin" include Muhammad, his daughter Fatimah, and the Twelve Imams. Ismaili also attribute ismah to Ismaili imāms and Fatimah, daughter of Muhammad, while Zaidis do not attribute the quality to the Zaidi imams.

The doctrine of ismah has been rejected by some Muslims, such as the Kharijites who cited Quran 48:2 as evidence for the rejection.

Sunnis interpret ismah to mean that prophets are immune from telling lies (intentionally or unintentionally), of being Kafir (infidel) before or after their assignment, and of being unable to commit other sins intentionally. In other aspects, opinions diverge. Most Sunnis believe that it is possible for the prophets to accidentally commit sin, while the minority believe that it is not.

The purity of Ahl al-Bayt, the family of Muhammad, is manifested by the verse of purification in the Qur'an. The development of Shi'ite theology in the period between the death of Muhammad and the disappearance of the Twelfth Imam extends this concept of purity and originates the concept of ismah. The concept of the immunity from sin (ma'sum) of the imams, the Imamiyyah, perhaps began in the first half of the second century AH. Shia scholars of the fourth and the fifth centuries AH extended the infallibility of Muḥammad and the Twelve Imams until the doctrine came to mean that they could not have committed any sin or inadvertent error either before or after they assumed office.

== Etymology ==
According to Edward Lane, the root of ismah is `asama (Arabic: عَصَمَ), which means protected or defended; and thus ismah means prevention or protection. Ismah is translated by (de:) A. J. Wensinck as impeccability, by William M. Miller as immunity to sin, and by W. Ivanow as infallibility.

Shia's fourth Imam, Zayn al-Abidin, regarded ismah as "a quality which enables a man to seize firmly to the Qur'an". Al-Abidin said that the Qur'an and the Fourteen Infallibles will not be separated from each other until the Day of Judgment, and that each one of them guides the other. He cites the Qur'an 17:9 to support his claim.

To Al-Raghib al-Isfahani and Murtada al-Zabidi, ismah is God's preservation of the infallibles, accomplished in stages. The first stage is to bestow on infallibles a robust constitution, followed by excellent qualities, then a firm will against opponents and enemies, followed by the sending of tranquility (as-Sakina) down upon them, (Note: Qur'an, 9: 26) and by the preparation of their hearts and minds to accept truth. The final stage is endowing the infallibles with "the ability to avoid acts of disobedience in spite of having the power to disobey".

Tabatabaei claims that ismah is the presence of a quality in man which protects him from error. Ismah also involves perfection of intellect and the lack of deficiency in knowledge.

== Concept ==
From a Shia theological perspective, ash-Shaykh al-Saduq argues that ismah is a quality peculiar only to the Twelve Imams; it is a natural state of immunity from sin which is seen as a miraculous gift from God. An infallible is regarded as preserved from sin because of his or her supreme level of righteousness, consciousness, love of God, and thorough knowledge of the consequence of sin. An infallible is considered immune from error in practical affairs, in calling people to religion, and in perception of divine knowledge, so that their followers do not fall into error.

Nasir al-Din al-Tusi has said that the infallibility of the Imam does not exclude the capacity to commit sins. Allamah Majlesi says that through reason and intellect, steadfastness in prayer and fasting, and by God's guidance, a person can reach a state where there is no desire except God's desire, and, because of an excessive love of God, shame in committing sin.

According to Tabatabaei, there is a quality of man that protects him from committing sin or error. Tabatabaei equates this quality with knowledge. Virtues such as bravery, chastity, and generosity are forms of knowledge, deeply rooted in the human psyche, that enable a person to abstain from indulging in extremes of behavior: for example, cowardice and recklessness, austerity and dissipation, or miserliness and extravagance. An increase in knowledge means increased obedience to God. In ordinary people with imperfect knowledge, virtue can be overpowered and tainted by desires and vices. Prophets are bestowed with supreme knowledge and thus a spiritual faculty that always remain unaffected by whims and vices. This supreme knowledge in prophets is ismah. Ismah does not nullify the prophets' free will to choose whether to commit sin or not.

=== Free will ===
Ismah is regarded by Shi‘ites as being bestowed as a blessing from God upon infallibles, and that this blessing has both voluntary and involuntary aspects, the voluntary aspect being the efforts of infallibles to act according to God's orders, the involuntary aspect being inheritance and training, not acquired through effort, but as a special favor from God. Al-Mofid said that ismah is God's gift to someone He knows will act impeccably and not be disobedient. Therefore, in the perspective of Shi‘ites, infallibles abstained from committing sins because of their knowledge of the consequence of sin, that God had foreknowledge of their future, knowing that they will save themselves from sin and error, and that Verse 5: 67 confirms this notion by explaining the role of the prophet's will in deciding whether to perform or reject an action.

==== Prophets ====
Among the doctrines that arose from the mid-2nd century AH (8th century CE) onwards is that ismat al-anbiya (the protection of the Prophets) means God's protection of the prophets from sin and error. This doctrine seems to have originated from among the Shia, but is embraced, in one way or another, by almost all Muslim sects and theological and legal schools. A major dispute deals with, whether prophets are sinless from the beginning, or if they are only sinless after they started their prophetic mission.

Among non-Shi‘ites, Ashari theologian Fakhr ad-Din ar-Razi is one of the supporters of the idea of the ismah of the prophets. He stated his view is as follows: "According to us the best view is that, owing to their prophethood, there is neither a grave nor a small sin or error (dhanb)." Besides investigating the subject in his Commentary on the Qur'an, he wrote a separate book titled Ismatu'l-Anbiya (The Sinlessness of the Prophets), and championed the cause of this dogma being a part of Sunni theology. But Abū Hayyān al-Tawhīdī, a Sunni Philosopher, rejected this doctrine. Over the course of history, Sunni views varied to the extent of protection, distinguishing between major sins (al-kaba'ir), minor sins (al-sagha'ir), inadvertent error (sahw) forgetfulness (nisyan) and lapses (zallat). F. Some of them argued, it is necessary to commit mistakes to teach people how to repent. The notion that prophets are generally sinless was first pushed by Asharites and Maturidites, but not accepted by Hanbalites.

Annemarie Schimmel believed that "The absolute obedience owed to the Prophet is meaningful only if Muhammad is free from any faults and could thus constitute an immaculate model for even the most insignificant part of life." Shia and some Sunni scholars believe that the prophets were given ismah even before their assignment to the prophecy, and that it covered every aspect of their life including the emotional, behavioral, personal, social, intentional and unintentional. Representing Shi‘ites' point-of-view, Tabatabaei stated that Ismah took two forms with regard to revelation: firstly, that the prophets were necessarily free from sin in the reception of revelation, in its preservation, and in its propagation, due to the principle of ontological guidance, which stated that God, in His omniscience and omnipotence, did not err in guiding those whom He desired to guide; and, secondly, that Ismah implied protection from sin based on the prophets' will and knowledge. Tabatabaei also said that if the prophets' actions contradict their words, setting one example by their actions but preaching something else, this would obscure the truth, which would undermine the religious mission of the prophets, therefore, that the Ismah of the prophets in delivering the message of Allah depends upon their Ismah with regard to their inability to sin. Another argument from him was that all the prophets were guided by God, that everyone who is guided by God never sins, and that the prophets were therefore free from error.

Early Twelver scholars weren't in agreement over the issue of prophetic forgetfulness. Al-Saduq accepted that Muhammad could experience inadvertence during prayer, whereas al-Mufid rejected this position. In Tahdhib al-Ahkam, al-Tusi rejects reports attributing forgetfulness in prayer to Muhammad as contrary to reason.

==== Imams ====
Shi‘ites not only interpret Qur’an 2:124 as saying that the Imam is appointed by God, but that the Imam's ismah is manifest. They also believe that ismah is a hidden virtue, and that, in order to assure that God's message is clear, so that people will not have ignorance as an excuse on the Day of Resurrection, (Note: Itmam al-hujjah, as expressed in Qur'an 4:165: [We sent] messengers as bringers of good tidings and warners so that mankind will have no argument against Allah after the messengers. And ever is Allah Exalted in Might and Wise.) God must provide a succession of Imams, each with the appropriate attributes and ismah, as messengers, to guide the people and to interpret the Qur'an for all time.

Shi‘ites believe that the prophets are free from all sin—major or minor, intentional or unintentional, before or after their assignment, in matters relevant to their mission or not—and that the prophet's commands and prohibitions are those of Allah. Shia also believe that the prophets have complete knowledge of Allah's will given to them by the First Infallible, Muhammad, which at all times causes them to act perfectly in religious matters; and that "as a result of the presence of Muhammadan Light, the Imam possesses the quality of inerrancy (ismah), in spiritual and religious matters...and this Light is the source of knowledge and revelation." According to Twelver Shia, The Fourteen Infallibles (ma'sumun), who are "divinely bestowed free from error and sin", include Muhammad, his daughter Fatimah, and the Twelve Imams, with Fatimah's infallibility being derived from her being a link between prophethood and Imamah, the two institutions characterized by infallibility, as well as her association with the Imams and their attributes in numerous ahadith.

=== Angels ===
The idea that angels are protected from sin, probably roots in the teachings of Hasan al-Basri and the early stages of the Mu'tazilites. Not only does he referred to Quranic verses emphasizing the nobility of angels, he also offered interpretations regarding verses proposing the opposite. Al-Basri taught that angels are, due to their lack of bodily desires, the most noble beings. Thus, he ranked them higher than humans and prophets. However, this position was never a mainstream position among either Sunnis nor Shia in early Islam. Most classical Qur'anic commentators and theologiansaccept at least three fallen angels (Iblis, Harut, and Marut).

Shi'ites believe that the Prophets, Apostles, and Imams are more excellent than angels, based on Quran 15:30 and Q2:33. Imam Tabari (839–923 CE) does not even consider angelic infallibility in his discussion on the nature of Iblis (if Iblis was an angel and became a devil or was a devil from the beginning). However, few exceptions exist. For example, according to Al-Shaykh al-Saduq, based on 16:50 and 21: 27 of the Qur’an, he agrees with al-Basri's view point that angels never disobey God, that they are free from sins and impurities, and that anyone who denies the infallibility of Messengers, Prophets, Imams, and Angels is a kafir (unbeliever). Yet, this interpretation is not shared universally. Based on Quran 2:30 and Quran 2:34, other scholars argue that angels can err, although the majority always remains obedient, as stated by Bulak al-Djurdjani.

Most Sunni scholars do not apply ismah to the angels but opinions vary, as it does with the prophets. Some assert, that only the messengers are infalliable. Most Salafi Sunnis usually reject accounts on erring angels entirely and do not investigate this matter further. Ashari theologian Fakhr ad-Din ar-Razi—in his book Tafseer ul Kabeer, on verse 66:6—said, "there is an indication in this verse that in the hereafter the angels are bound with obligations (like human beings in this world). They are under obligation, commands and prohibitions in the hereafter. The disobedience of angels lies in their opposition to Allah’s commandment and prohibition." Yet another Asharite, al-Taftazani (1322–1390 AD), accepted that angels might slip into error and become disobedient, but rejected that angels would ever consciously turn against God's command and become unbelievers.

Mulla Sadra, a Shi‘ite philosopher, uses both rational and theological arguments in defense of the infallibility of angels: "The sense of sin and fallibility is to contrast between lowly faculties and sublime faculties, where the soul wants superlative motives but motives and inner purposes contradict. These contradictions and contrasts are endemic to beings who are of a composite nature. In other words, beings are composed of contradictions and contrasting faculties, whereas angels are simple and not composed of anything." According to Sadra, the verse 16: 50 refers to infallibility of angels, in general.

=== History of the concept ===
Ja'far Sobhani, a Shi‘ite scholar, claimed that the concept of ismah originated from the Qur’an, regarding the prophet (Q53:3–4), angels (66: 6), and the Qur'an itself (41: 42) Dwight M. Donaldson regards the origin and importance of the concept of ismah owes to the development of the theology of the Shi'ites in the period between the death of Muhammad and the disappearance of the Twelfth Imam.Ann Lambton claims that neither the term nor the concept of ismah is found in either the Qur'an or in the canonical Sunni hadith. It was apparently first used by the Imamiyyah, perhaps around the beginning of the second century AH, to maintain that the Imam must be immune from sin (ma'sum). Hamid Algar states that the ascription of infallibility to the Imams is encountered as early as the first half of the 8th century, second century AH, and it was soon extended to the prophets. The doctrine came to exclude the commission of any sin or inadvertence on their part, either before or after their assumption of office.

Regarding the concept of ismah in the Shi'i doctrine, Imams have a more central role compared to the caliph in Sunni political theory. Perhaps the evolution of this doctrine, as Donaldson suggests, caused Shi‘ite scholars to establish the claims of the Imamah against the claims of Sunni caliphs, so the doctrine was expanded and elaborated upon.

According to Francis Robinson, though Shi'ism initially began as a movement of political opposition to the Caliphs, the belief that eventually developed was that the Imams possessed superhuman qualities of sinlessness and infallibility.

Henry Corbin believed that historical criticism would be quiet, particularly about ismah, and that what has been described altogether is hierohistory. He emphasized a phenomenogical approach, in that one must discover the aims of Shi‘ite awareness in order to share its vision; a vision which it has been acquiring ever since it began.

== Arguments about the concept of infallibility ==
=== For ===
==== Using the Qur'an and ahadith ====
In the perspective of Shi'ites, Verse 4: 64 of the Qur’an (Note: And We did not send any messenger except to be obeyed by permission of Allah...) expresses an absolute order to follow the messengers, so they must be infallible. Verse 4: 59 (Note: O you who have believed, obey Allah and obey the Messenger and those in authority among you...) and other such verses express the virtues of obedience and the terrible results of disobedience. Allah orders the servants to obey Him and His messengers, who are equivalent, according to verse 4: 80. (Note: He who obeys the Messenger has obeyed Allah....) So, if the prophet be not infallible, it is a contradictory order. In other verses, He orders: Then do not obey the deniers (68: 8), And do not obey every worthless habitual swearer (68: 10), ...do not obey from among them a sinner or ungrateful [disbeliever] (76: 24). So, the messengers are to be obeyed, the sinners are not to be obeyed, the result is that the messengers are not sinful.

The verse of purification (Note: Qur'an, 33: 33...Allah intends only to remove from you the impurity [of sin], O people of the [Prophet's] household, and to purify you with [extensive] purification) implies that it is the will of Allah (Note: یرید الله) to purify none but (Note: expressed by the word "انّما") the Ahl al-Bayt as free of any kind of sin, error, and defilement. Abundant traditions in Shia and Sunni hadith state that, by the term Ahl al-Bayt, the Five Pure People—or the Ahl al-Kisa, not including the prophets' wives—are meant. Shia interpretation of the verse of purification is based on the Hadith of Ahl al-Kisa’, which is an account of the Prophet gathering his four family members under his cloak. This is in accordance with scholars such as Wilferd Madelung, Momen, and Kardan, who claim that the verse of purification is proof of the purification of the Ahl al-Bayt.

According to several Shi‘ite and Sunni ahadith, Muhammad clearly stated that Ali was protected against sin and error, and that his sayings and deeds were consistent with teachings of Islam. The status of Imams as "proof of Allah to mankind" serves as an argument for their infallibility, and the words of the Household of the Prophet are complementary to the religious sciences, and authoritative and inerrant in the teachings of Islam, in the perspective of Shi‘ites.

Provided that the obedience is compulsory, it may be concluded that the apostles and Ulil-Amr (Arabic: أُولي الأَمـر) (Note: those vested with authority) are sinless. Many verses in the Qur’an order men not to obey the unjust. Instead in the Qur’an (Note: Qur'an, 4: 59) Allah orders the believers to follow the apostle and the Ulul-Amr, and joins that obedience to obedience to Him, with the condition that no difference of opinion exists between Ulul-Amr and the Messenger, in any matter: "O you who have believed, obey Allah and obey the Messenger and those in authority among you. And if you disagree over anything, refer it to Allah and the Messenger, if you should believe in Allah and the Last Day. That is the best [way] and best in result."

==== Philosophical and theological ====
According to Shi‘ites, people know that they are possessed by Allah, but that acting while under that possession, without His permission, is evil. If they are to gain His favor, but can not be sure of the righteousness of their actions, there must be a prophet to give that permission, and to inform them of that which they do not know and of the rewards of obedience and punishments of disobedience. The prophets teach that which is needed to live a righteous life. In addition, according to philosophical and theological doctrines, to establish the rule of Grace and the clarity of the Divine message, (Note: itmam al-hujjah) Allah sent selected individuals as prophets to guide the people, to establish a social system, and to put an end to intellectual and social disputes. Thus, they believe that discharging of such a heavy responsibility is only possible if the prophet is immune from any error, and always reflects all aspects of truth and the Divine Will. Therefore, in their perspective, it is only in this way that people are guided and can form a wholesome social system, and that the philosophy behind the sending of the prophets necessitates their infallibility, and that their thoughts, actions, and sayings reflect Divine Will. Therefore, Allah does not guide via authoritative texts (i.e. the Qur'an and Hadith) alone, but also through specially endowed individuals known as Imams. Shi‘ites believe that status and authority attributed to Imams would have been senseless if they were prone to the same weaknesses found in ordinary people, therefore, that the prophets must be infallible (ma'sum) for the same reason that they were sent. In other words, they believe that the ismah or infallibility of the messengers establishes the authenticity of the message: To be required to follow a prophet who commits sin is a contradiction.

- Nasir al-Din al-Tusi regarded infallibility as fundamental for Imams in order to avoid contradiction ad infinitum, saying that it would be necessary to disclaim a prophet if he has committed any sin.
- Al-Hilli argued that man is naturally urban and cannot be satisfied out of society. Thus, conflict would unceasingly arise without an infallible to judge men. In Al-Alfayn, he emphasized the need for a ruler (ra'is) to preserve shari'a, to prevent men from committing aggression against each other, to restrain tyrants, and to help the oppressed. Without a leader, the Qur'an and Sunnah would not be observed. Inevitably there must be an Imam, immune from error and sin, appointed by Allah to specify the dimensions (ahkam) of shari'a. It is necessary for the prophet to be the best of his age, because Allah requires humankind to follow the one who guides them to the Truth. If the guide is imperfect, he cannot lead to the Truth. He said that a prophet is immune from sin from the first day of his life until the last day, because people do not like and trust someone who has perpetrated an immoral deed, even in the past; and it is clear that everyone likes to follow the sinless rather than the sinful, therefore, that a prophet must even be free from any kind of imperfection outside of himself, such as baseness of his father or debauchery of his mother, as well as imperfections relating to (1) his own character (akhlaq), such as harshness or crudeness; (2) his own condition (ahwal), such as association with corrupt people; and (3) his nature (tabi'a), such as insanity, dumbness, or being out of himself. Otherwise, the prophet will lose his position in the hearts of the people, his message will be as nonsense, and his mission will not be fulfilled.
- According to ‘Ali Tabatabaei, human beings should have a true vision of the real nature of man and the world, in order to identify and perform their true duties, and that there should be a religious government to execute the Islamic orders till the people can worship only Allah and enjoy personal and social justice, and that this goal is achieved only by an infallible person who is protected against faults by Allah.
- Motahhari regarded Ismah as necessary for the supreme authority in the religion. In other words, according to him, the Imam must be followed, and his words and actions are as an example and proof for others.
- Others believed that physical descent from the Prophet was never enough to make an Imam, but that Ismah or impeccability was a vital criterion for him.

=== Against ===
Zaydi Shi‘ites and non-Shi‘ites, such as the Kharijites, rejected the doctrine of Ismah, pointing to verse 48:2 of the Qur’an, in which God said to Muḥammad:"That God may forgive thee thy preceding and thy subsequent sin, and may complete his favour on thee, and direct thee in the right way ".

== Differing views of other sects ==
Isma‘ilites also attribute Ismah to Imāms and Fatima Zahra, daughter of Muhammad. Sunnis have different opinions regarding Ismah: on lying and infidelity, Sunnis believe that prophets could not tell a lie, intentionally or unintentionally; they could not be Kafir before or after their assignment and also they do not commit other sins intentionally. Concerning major unintentional sins, the majority believes that the prophets could commit such sins; however, a minority says it is impossible. Regarding minor unintentional sins, most of them believe that the prophets could commit sin, though not such minor sins which would disgrace them in public.

== New interpretation among Shi‘ites ==
A recent and very influential Shi‘ite interpretation of ismah by Ruhollah Khomeini holds that truly faithful and pious Muslims—not just Prophets and Imams—could possess ismah, because it could be created by "nothing other than perfect faith." He preached that "infallibility is borne by faith. If one has faith in Allah, and if one sees Allah with the eyes of his heart, like the sun, it would be impossible for him to commit a sin. In front of an armed powerful [master], infallibility is attained."

Nasr Dabashi argues that Khomeini's theory of ismah from faith was connected to his theory of Islamic government by guardianship of the jurist. If the truly faithful possessed ismah, and if Khomeini and the most learned and pious Islamic jurists were truly faithful, than this would reassure Shi'ites hesitant about granting the same ruling authority to Khomeini and his successors that Shi'ites traditionally believed was reserved for the 12th Imam (Mahdi) on his return. According to Dabashi, Khomeini's theory helped "to secure the all-important attribute of infallibility for himself as a member of the awliyah (friends of God), by eliminating the theological problems of undermining the expectation of the Mahdi."

According to Mesbah-Yazdi, there is an intellectual argument that if getting to the ideal is impossible or difficult, then be satisfied with the less ideal concerning a matter. This argument is called "gradual degradation". (Note: تنزل تدریجی)

== See also ==
- Imamah
- Papal infallibility
- Impeccability
- Prophecy (Shia Islam)
