= Abu Muhammad al-Hasan ibn Musa al-Nawbakhti =

Persian theologian and philosopher

Naubachtī, al-Hasan ibn Mūsā

Personal life
- Born: c. 9th century
- Died: c. 912–922
- Notable work: Firaq aš-šī'a
- Other names: Nawbakhtī, Abu Muhammad al-Hasan ibn Mūsā; (نوبختي, أبو محمد الحسن بن موسى)
- Occupation: philosopher, theologian, author on Shia Islam

Religious life
- Religion: Islam
- Denomination: Shia

Abū Muḥammad al-Ḥasan b Mūsā an-Nawbakhtī (الحسن بن موسى النوبختي; born late 9th century and died between 912 and 922) was a leading Shī'ī Muslim theologian and philosopher in the first half of the 10th century of Persian descent. The Nawbakhtī family boasted a number of scholars famous at the Abbāsid court of Hārūn al-Rashīd (786–809). Al-Ḥasan ibn Mūsa is best known for his book about the Shi'a sects titled Firaq al-Shi'a, which significantly relies on Hisham ibn al-Hakam's earlier work Ikhtilaf al-nass fi l-imama.

== Life ==
Abū Muḥammad al-Ḥasan ibn Mūsa al-Nawbakhti was the nephew of the theologian philosopher Abū Sahl ibn Nawbakht. Among his fellow translators of books of philosophy were Abū 'Uthmān al-Dimashqi, Isḥāq ibn Ḥunayn, and Thābit ibn Qurra. It was claimed al-Ḥasan ibn Mūsa was both Muʿtazila and Shī’a for the Nawbakht family were known followers of ‘Alī. He transcribed a large number of books and wrote books on theology, philosophy and other topics. His book Firaq aš-šī'a (The sects of Shi'a) is the earliest surviving complete work on the Shiite sects, and the oldest text from an imamitic perspective on the differences between the various Islamic sects and their origins within Shiism.

== Works ==
- Ritter, Hellmut, ed. (1931). "Firaq aš-šī'a". Bibliotheca Islamica (in Arabic) (4) (Digitalisat ed.). Istanbul: Maṭba'at ad-daula.
- ar-Radd 'alā' l-ġulāt

=== Titles listed in al-Fihrist ===
- Kitāb al-arā' wa-'d-diyānāt (كتاب الاراء و الديانات ولم يتمّه); Doctrines and Religions (unfinished)
- Kitāb ar-radd alā' aṣḥāb at-tanāsukh (كتاب الردّ الى اصحاب التناسخ); Refutation of Upholders of Transmigration (At-tanāsukh)
- Kitāb at-tawḥīd wa ḥadīth al-Ilal (كتاب التوحيد وحدث العلل); Oneness and the Principal Cause
- Kitāb naqḍ (كتاب نقض) Refutation Book
- Kitāb Abū ‘Īsā fī ‘l-gharīb al-mashraqī (كتاب ابى عيسى في الغريب المشرقى); Refutation of the Book of Abū ‘Īsā about the Unusual Easterner (Note: Al-Gharīb al-Mashraqī fī al-Nawḥ bu Abū ‘Īsā al-Warrāq)
- Kitāb Ikhtiṣārī Ikhtiṣār al-kūn wa’l-fasād li-Arisṭālīs (كتاب اختصارِ اختصار الكون والفساد لارسطاليس); Abridgement of Aristotle’s “De Generatione et Corruptione”
- Kitāb al-Ihtijāj li ‘Umar ibn ‘Abbād wa nuṣrat madhabuhu (كتاب الاحتجاج لعمر بن عباد ونصرة مذهبه); Proof by Umar ibn ‘Abbād and a Defense of his Doctrines (Note: By “proof” al-Nadīm may refer to the title or to proving something to Umar ibn ‘Abbād.)
- Kitāb al-Āmāmat (كتاب الامامة); ‘The Imamate’ (unfinished)
