= Twelver Shi'ism =

Branch of Shia Islam

Twelverism
- الإثنا عشرية (Arabic); دوازده‌امامی (Persian)
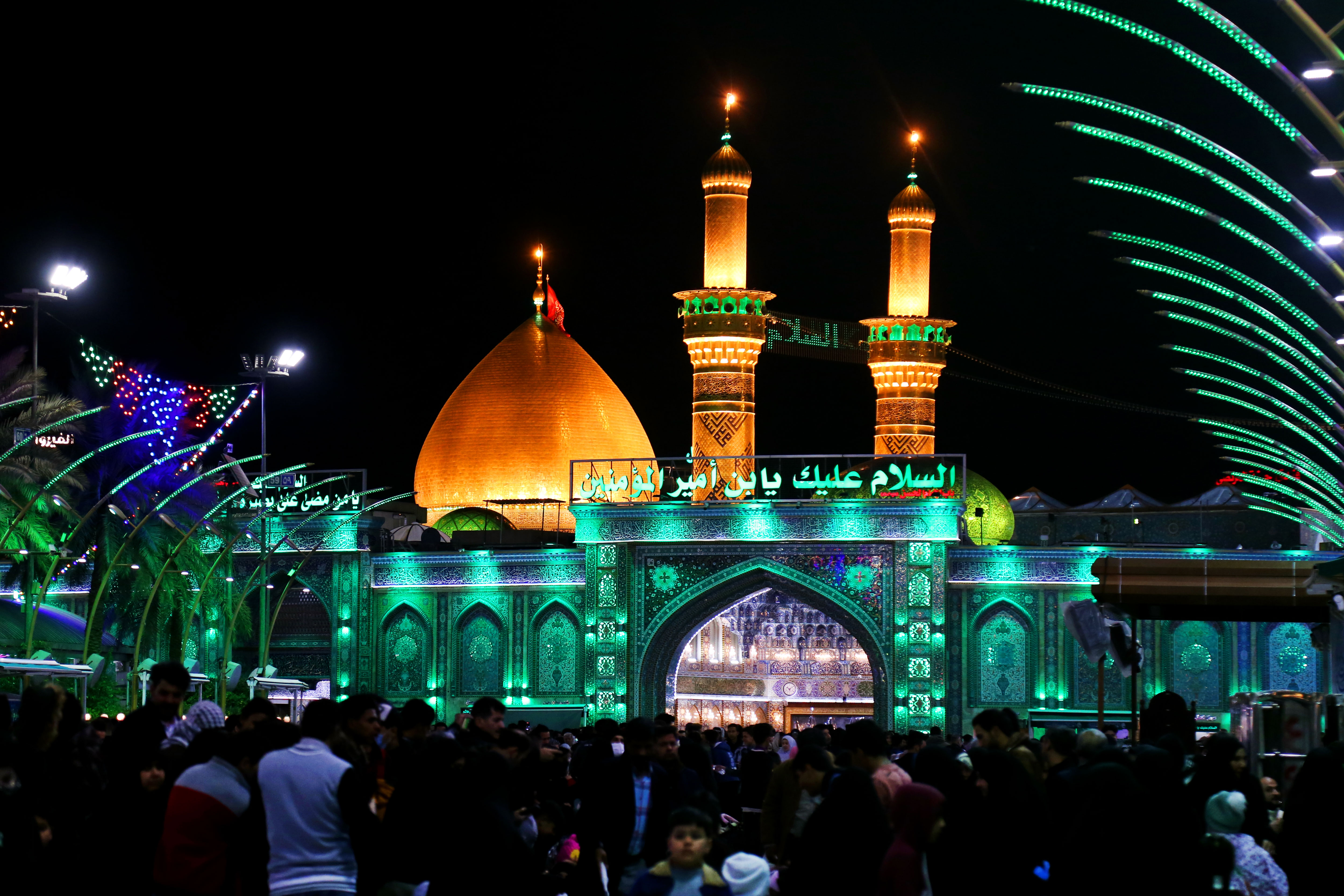
- A photo shot at night in Karbala of a Shrine. Its often the most important area Twelvers believe in.
- Classification: Shia Islam
- Theology: Imamate (Twelver)
- Imam: Muhammad al-Mahdi (in occultation)
- Branches and Groups: Branches of Twelver Shi'ism
- Territory: Iran; Iraq; Azerbaijan; Turkey
- Origin: 9th century Middle East
- Separations: Alawites, Alevis
- Members: 170–220 million

Twelver Shi'ism (Arabic: اِثْنَا عَشَرِيَّة, romanized: Ithnā ʿAshariyya; Persian: دوازده‌ امامی, romanized: Davāzdah-emāmī; Turkish: Onikicilik) is the largest branch of Shia Islam. Twelver Shi'as believe that the Twelve Imams are divinely appointed as both spiritual and political successors to the Islamic prophet Muhammad, and that they possess special knowledge and authority to guide the Muslim community. According to Twelver theology, the Twelve Imams are exemplary human individuals who rule over the Muslim community (Ummah) with justice, and are able to preserve and interpret the Islamic law (Sharia) and the esoteric meaning of the Qur'an. The words and deeds (sunnah) of Muhammad and the Imams are a guide and model for the Muslim community to follow. As a result, Muhammad and the Imams must be free from error and sin, a doctrine known as Ismah (literally 'protection') or infallibility, and must be chosen by divine decree, or nass, through Muhammad.

Globally, there are about 170–220 million Twelvers. These include: most of the inhabitants of Iran, Iraq, and Azerbaijan, about half of the Muslim population of Bahrain and Lebanon, and sizeable minorities in India, Pakistan, Afghanistan, Saudi Arabia, Kuwait, Oman, the United Arab Emirates, and Qatar. Iran is the only country where Twelver Shi'ism is the state religion.

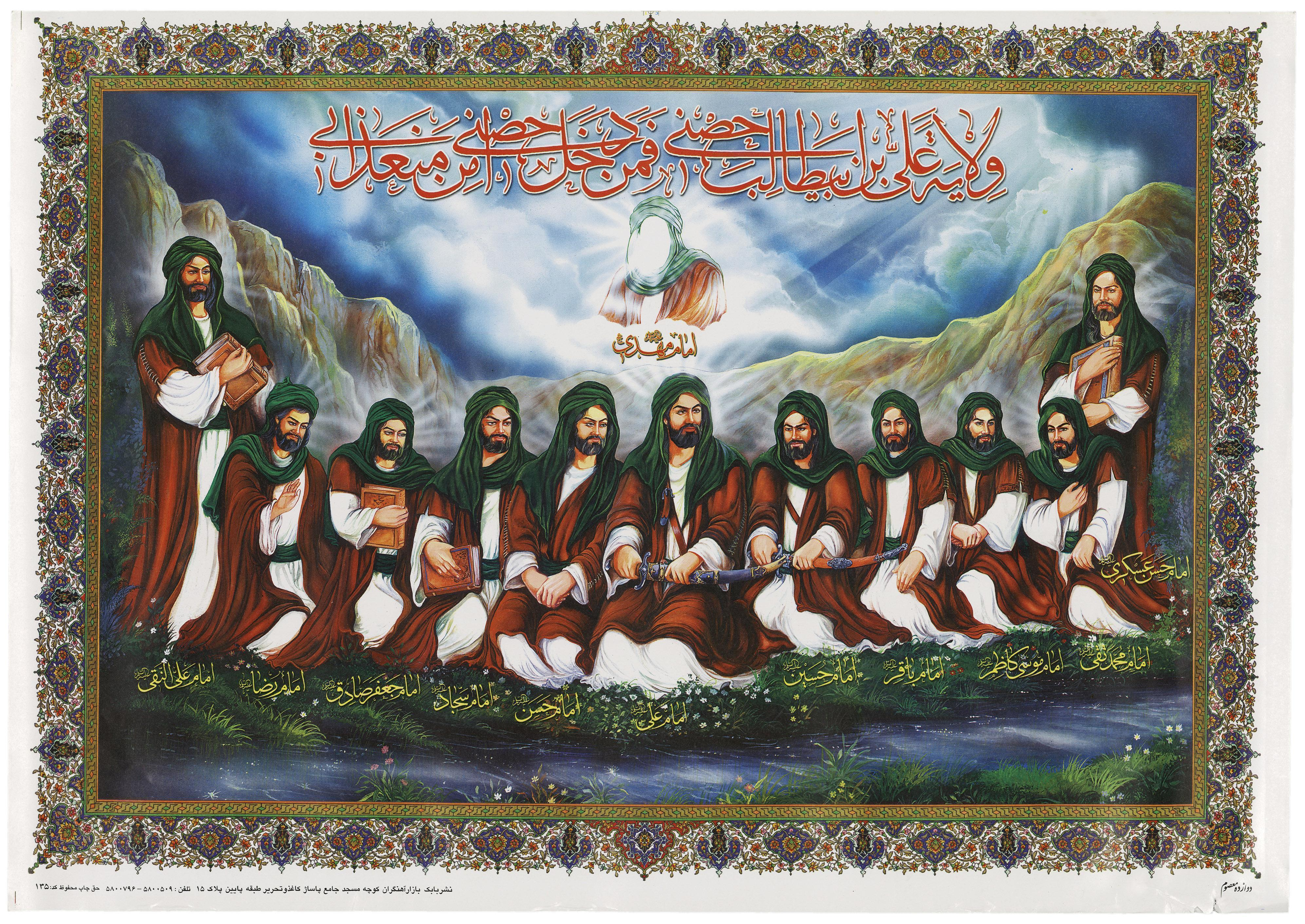
A depiction of the Twelve Imams from 1980: in the depiction, the person whose face is obscured by light is the Hidden Imam, and the person in the front and center is Ali

Twelvers share many tenets with other Shi'ite sects, such as the belief in the Imamate. The Isma'ili and Nizari branches believe in a different number of Imams and, for the most part, a different path of succession regarding the Imamate. They also differ in the role and overall definition of an Imam. Twelvers are also distinguished from Isma'ilis by their belief in Muhammad's status as the "Seal of the Prophets" (Khatam an-Nabiyyin), in rejecting the possibility of abrogation of Sharia laws, and in considering both esoteric and exoteric aspects of the Qur'an. Alevis in Turkey and Albania, and Alawites in Syria and Lebanon, share belief in the Twelve Imams with Twelvers, but their theological doctrines are markedly different.

== Terminology ==
The term Twelver is based on the belief that twelve male descendants from the family of Muhammad, starting with Ali ibn Abi Talib and ending with Muhammad al-Mahdi, are Imams who have religious and political authority.

The Twelvers are also known by other names:

- Shi'a refers to a group of Muslims who believe that the succession to Muhammad must remain in his family for specific members who are designated by a divine appointment. Tabatabai states that the word referred to the partisans of Ali at the time of Muhammad himself.
- Ja'fari refers exclusively to the Juridical school which is followed by Twelvers and Nizaris. The term is derived from the name of Ja'far al-Sadiq who is considered by the Twelvers and Nizaris to be their sixth Imam who presented "a legal treatise". Ja'far al-Sadiq is also respected and referenced by the founders of the Sunni Hanafi and Maliki schools of jurisprudence.
- Imami or Imamiyyah or Imamite is a reference to the Twelver belief in the infallibility of the Imāms. Although the Ismā'īlīs also share the concept of Imamate, this term is mostly used for the Twelvers who believe that the leadership of the community after Muhammad belongs to twelve subsequent successors including Ali that together comprise the Fourteen Infallibles.

== History ==
=== Imamate era ===
==== Twelver imams amongst Shia ====
===== Emergence =====
In 610, when Muhammad received the first revelation, Ali was 10 years old. At the time of Muhammad, some of the supporters of Ali, particularly Miqdad ibn al-Aswad, Salman the Persian, Abu Dharr al-Ghifari, and Ammar ibn Yasir were called the Shiites of Ali. The division of Islam into Shia and Sunni traces back to the crisis of the succession to Muhammad. The followers of Ali fought with some of the Quraysh and some of the companions of Muhammad like Talhah and Zubayr. As most of his supporters were in Iraq, Ali moved the capital of Islam to Kufa and there began to fight against Mu'awiyah, who rejected giving allegiance to Ali. The death of Husayn played an important role in the spread of Shi'ism in the regions of Iraq, Yemen and Persia. At the end of the first century, the influential leaders in the government established the city of Qom for the settlement of the Shia.

===== Formulation =====
Muhammad Al-Baqir was teacher of law for 20 years and a reporter of hadith. He also introduced the principle of Taqiyya. Al-Baqir narrated many a hadith about Jurisprudence and other religious sciences which based the foundations for the Shia instructions. With change in political situations and a suitable conditions for the development of religious activities and the time of elaborating the religious sciences, Ja'far al-Sadiq had an important role in forming the Shia Jurisprudence.

Ja'far al-Sadiq and al-Baqir are the founders of the Imami Shiite school of religious law. Al-Sadiq acquired a noteworthy group of scholars around himself, comprising some of the most eminent jurists, traditionists, and theologians of the time. During his time, Shia developed in the theological and legal issues. Both Muhammad al-Baqir and Ja'far al-Sadiq improved the position of the Shia and elaborated the intellectual basis of the interpretation and practice of Shiite Islam. Their teachings were the basis for the development of Shiite spirituality and religious rituals.

===== Organizing =====
At the beginning of the ninth century, once again Shia Islam flourished due to the translation of scientific and philosophical books from other languages to Arabic, Al-Ma'mun giving freedom to the propagation of different religious views and his interest in intellectual debates. Under the rule of al-Ma'mun, Shia was free from the political pressures and was somehow at liberty. In the fourth/tenth century, the weaknesses in the Abbasid government and coming up the Buyid rulers caused the spread, strength and open propagation of the Shi'ism. From the fifth/eleventh to the ninth century many Shia kings appeared in the Islamic world who propagated the Shi'ism.

=== Crisis and consolidation ===
==== Baghdad school ====
During the tenth century and the Buyid era, Baghdad was the center of Mu'tazila theologians. Their ideas about attribute and justice of God and human free will affected Shia theologians. Bani Nawbakht, particularly Abu Sahl al-Nawbakhti (d. 923), fused Mu'tazili theology with Imami system of thought. On the other hand, Imami traditionists of Qom, particularly Ibn Babawayh (d. 991), reacted to their theological ideas based on Twelve Imams' Hadiths. He tried to defend Imami ideas against Mu'tazili criticism regarding Anthropomorphism (Tashbih).

The three prominent figures of Baghdad school were Al-Shaykh al-Mufid (d. 1022 CE), Sharif al-Murtaza (d. 1044) and Shaykh al-Tusi (d. 1067).

Al-Mufid was a Twelver theologian, Muhaddith and Fiqih who used Bani Nawbakht as well as Baghdadi Mu'tazila ideas to form his theology while trying to adapt theological ideas with Twelve Imams' Hadith. While the Mu'tazila was dominant in Baghdad, he tries to distinguish Shia and Mu'tazila ideas and assert reason needs revelation.

Shaykh Tusi, founder of Shia Ijtihad, was the first to establish the bases of reasoning in Shia Jurisprudence. His book al-Mabsut is the first book of Ijtihad which derives the subordinates from the principles. Tusi brought the Shia religious law to a new period. The main point is that he recognized the needs of the community and preserved the principles.

By his debates and books, al-Mufid, Sayyid-al Murtada and Shaykh al-Tusi in Iraq were the first to introduce the Usul of the Jurisprudence under the influence of the Shafe'i and Mu'tazili doctrines. Al- Kulayni and al-Sadduq, in Qom and Ray, were concerned with traditionalist approach.

Twelver Imams amongst other Shia imam with their early Imams are shown in the chart below. This also indicate twelvers amongst various other sects in the present world.

=== Jurisprudential and theological development ===
==== School of Hillah ====
The beginner of this school, Ibn Idris al-Hilli (d. 1202), with his rationalistic tendency, detailed Shi'ite jurisprudence in his al-Sara'ir. Ibn Idris, with rejecting the validity of the isolate hadith, states rational faculty ('aql) as the fourth source of law in deducing legal norms before Quran and hadith. The real Usuli doctrinal movement was begun by al-Muhaqqiq al-Hilli (d. 1277) who brought up ijtihad and qiyas (analogy) to jurisprudence. Ijtihad brought dynamism into Shia law. Muhaqqiq Hilli and al-Hilli gave a definite shape to Shia jurisprudence and they separated the weak hadith from the sound. According to John Cooper, after al-Hilli, Imami theology and legal methodology became thoroughly infused with the terminology and style of philosophy.

In 1256, the Abbasid dynasty collapsed with the invasion of Mongols to Baghdad. Under the ruling of Mongols, Shi'a were more free to develop and al-Hilla became the new learning center for Shia. Continuing the rationalistic tradition of the Baghdad School, defining reason as an important principle of Jurisprudence, al-Hillah school laid the theoretical foundation upon which the authority of Jurisprudents is based today.

The second wave of the Usulies was shaped in the Mongol period when al-Hilli used the term Mujtahid, the one who deduces the ordinance on the basis of the authentic arguments of the religion. By Ijtihad, al-Hilli meant the disciplined reasoning on the basis of the shari'ah. By developing the principles of the Usul, he introduced more legal and logical norms which extended the meaning of the Usul beyond the four principal sources of Shari'ah.

==== School of Jabal 'Amil ====
Amili was the first who fully formulated the principles of the Ijtihad.

=== Rising to power ===
==== School of Isfahan ====
In 1501, Isma'il I took the power in Iran and set up the Safavid dynasty. While most of the larger cities of Iran were Sunni, he declared Twelverism as the official religion of his empire. Many Shia scholars were brought to set up the Shia seminaries in Iran. One of those was Karaki who stated that, for the interest of Umma, it is necessary for a Shia scholar to be a legitimate leader to carry out the tasks of the Imam who is hidden. Under Safavids, religious authorities (Shaykh al-Islam) were appointed for all major cities.

Karaki established a great seminary (Hawza) in Qazvin and Isfahan, consequently, Iran once again became center of Imami jurisprudence. Suhrawardi tried to harmonize rational philosophy and intellectual intuition, but Mir Damad is the founder of it. Mir Damad combined the teachings of Ibn Arabi, Suhrawardi, Ibn Sina and Nair al-Din and founded a new intellectual dimension in the texture of Shi'ism.

The scholars of the School of Isfahan integrated the philosophical, theological, and mystical traditions of Shi'ism into a metaphysical synthesis known as Divine Wisdom or theosophy (Persian:hikmat-i ilahi). The most important representative of the School of Isfahan was Mulla Sadra. Mulla Sadra produced his own synthesis of Muslim thought, including theology, peripatetic philosophy, philosophical mysticism, and Sufi studies, particularly the Sufism of Ibn al-'Arabi. Mulla Sadra trained eminent students, such as Mulla Muhsin Kashani and 'Abd al-Razzaq Lahiji who passed down the traditions of the School of Isfahan in later centuries in both Iran and India.

==== Akhbari-Usuli controversies ====
By the end of the Safavid era (1736), the Usuli School of thought was attacked by the Akhbari traditionalist trend, whose founder was Mulla Muhammad Amin al-Astarabadi. Astarabadi attacked the idea of Ijtihad and called the Usulies as the enemies of religion. He recognized the hadith as the only source for the Islamic law and the understanding of the Quran.

Muhammad Baqir Behbahani, as the founder of a new stage in Shia Jurisprudence, took a new practical method. He attacked the Akhbaris and their method was abandoned by Shia. The dominance of the Usuli over the Akhbari came in last half of the 18th century when Behbahani led Usulis to dominance and "completely routed the Akhbaris at Karbala and Najaf", so that "only a handful of Shi'i ulama have remained Akhbari to the present day." The reestablishment of the Usuli School led to the enhancement of the authority of the legal scholars in the Qajar dynasty.

==== Qom school, Iranian Revolution and Islamic Republic ====
During the 1960s, Ruhollah Khomeini called for the abolition of the western-backed monarchy in Iran. He was sent into exile in Iraq, where he continued his opposition to the Iranian regime. He further ordered the opposition to the Shah and led the 1979 revolution.

== Theological doctrine ==
Twelver theology, which mainly consists of five principles, (Note: Usul al-Din (Arabic: اصول الدین)) has formed over the course of history on the basis of the Quran, hadiths from Muhammad and the Twelve Imams (especially Jafar al-Sadiq), as well as in response to intellectual movements in the Muslim world and major events of the Twelver history, such as the Battle of Karbala and the occultation of the twelfth Imam, Muhammad al-Mahdi.

Mystics, philosophers, and traditional scholars all have diverse opinions about the unity of God, free will, and Judgement Day, as stated by Jafaar Seedaan. Care has been taken to mention the traditional view first and then mention other views as objectively as possible.

=== Unity of God ===
According to Hossein Nasr, Ali ibn Abi Talib, the first Shia Imam is credited with establishing Islamic theology and, among Muslims, his sermons contain the first philosophical proofs of God's unity (Tawhid).

Ali is quoted as arguing that "unity of God" means that God has no like; is not subject to numeration; and is indivisible in neither reality nor imagination. On another occasion, he is quoted saying:

The first step of religion is to accept, understand and realize him as the Lord ... The correct form of belief in his unity is to realize that he is so absolutely pure and above nature that nothing can be added to or subtracted from his being. That is, one should realize that there is no difference between his person and his attributes, and his attributes should not be differentiated or distinguished from his person.

Traditional Twelvers strictly believe that God is different from his creation and that both are separate entities.

However, Sayyid Haydar Amuli, a prominent Shia mystic and philosopher, defines God as alone in being, name, attributes, actions, and theophanies. The totality of being, therefore, is God, through God, comes from God, and returns to God. God is not a being next to or above other beings; God is Being; the absolute act of Being (wujud mutlaq). The divine unitude does not have the meaning of an arithmetical unity, among, next to, or above other unities. For, if there were being other than he (i.e., creatural being), God would no longer be the Unique, i.e., the only one to be. As this Divine Essence is infinite, his qualities are the same as his essence. Essentially, there is one Reality, which is one and indivisible.

According to Twelver theology, Tawhid consists of several aspects, including Tawhid of the Essence, the attributes, the creatorship, the lordship and oneness in worship.

==== Tawhid of the Essence ====
Tawhid of the essence of God means his essence is one and peerless. Regarding this, Quran 112 states: Say, "He is Allah, [who is] One, Allah, the Eternal Refuge. He neither begets nor is born, Nor is there to Him any equivalent. "

==== Tawhid of the attributes ====
Tawhid of the attributes means God's attributes have no other reality than His essence. Ali argues that "Every attribute testifies to its being other than the object to which it is attributed, and every such object in turn testifies to its being other than the attribute." Tawhid of the attributes means to deny the existence of any sort of multiplicity and combination in the Essence itself. A differentiation between the essence and the attributes or between the attributes implies a limitation in being.

Traditional Twelvers believe that God's names are created by Him and are not His attributes. A name is a combination of created letters while attributes are what is implied by that name. It is stated in Al-Kafi that whoever worships God's names has committed disbelief in God, as they are not Him.

==== Tawhid of Creatorship ====
Al-Hur Al-Amilly states that God created everything except humans' actions.

According to some Twelvers, Tawhid of Creatorship means that there is no creator but God, that is the causes and effects of the universe are not independent from God, just as the beings which are not independent in essence. There is no power except God, according to Motahari.

==== Tawhid of Lordship ====
Tawhid of Lordship means the governance of the world and that human beings only belong to God. This oneness of lordship has two aspects: creative governance (tadbir takwini), and religious governance (tadbir tashrii).

At last oneness in worship, i.e., God alone is deserved to be worshipped. According to Morteza Motahhari, oneness in worship means rejecting all kinds of counterfeit worship (such as worship of carnal desires, money or prestige), and as Quran says, every act of obedience to an order is worship.

==== Shirk ====
Contrary to Tawhid is Shirk. It is a belief that the world has more than one principle or pole.

According to the mystic and philosopher Morteza Motahhari, the distinction of theoretical Tawhid from Shirk is recognition of the idea that every reality and being in its essence, attributes and action are from him (from Him-ness (Arabic: انّالله)). Every supernatural action of the prophets is by God's permission as Quran points to it. Shirk in practice is to assume something as an end in itself, independent from God, but to assume it as a path to God (to Him-ness (Arabic: انّاالیه)) is Tawhid.

=== Justice of God ===
Ali insists that God is Just and he is the Justice Itself and the virtue of Justice flows from him to the souls of men. Since he is Justice, every thing he does is Just. Shiism considers Justice (Note: Adl (Arabic: عدل)) as innate to Divine nature, i.e. God can not act unjustly, because it is his nature to be just.

==== Justice in Creation ====
Twelvers believe that God grants every existent what is appropriate for it as the verse 20:50 states: Our Lord is He Who gave unto everything its nature, then guided it aright.

==== Justice in Religious Dispensation ====
God guides each human through sending messengers and He does not impose upon them obligations that are beyond their capacity. In the Message of The Quran by Mohammad Asad, the interpretation of v 20:50 is as follows; He(Moses) replied (to Pharaoh); Our Sustainer is He who gives unto every thing [ that exists] its true nature and form, and thereupon guides it [towards its fulfillment].

==== Justice in Recompense ====
Tabataba'i states that the Justice of God necessitates that the virtuous and evil people become separated; the virtuous have a good life and the evil have a wretched life. He will judge the beliefs and the deeds of all the people according to the truth and he will give every one his right due. Then the reality of every thing as it is will be revealed for the man. Through his faith and good deeds, he can get to friendship with God. The form of man's deeds are joined to his soul and accompany him which are the capital of his future life. The verse 96: 8 refers to getting back to God.

==== Predestination and Free Will ====
According to Twelvers' narrations, God does not create Humans' actions and instead they are fully created by humans. According to a narration by Musa Al-Khadhim, if God created humans' actions then He should not punish humans for it. Jaafar Al-Subhani argues that the justice of God requires that humans' actions cannot be created by God, otherwise God would be a doer of evil actions. Predestination is rejected in Shiism.

However, some philosophers believe that all the existence is His creation including a human being and his actions. But actions have two dimensions. The first is committing the action by free will, the second is the creation of that action by God's will with which he gave the people the power to commit the action. Sadr al-Din Shirazi states that "God, may He be exalted, is far removed from doing any evil deeds and goes about His Kingdom at will."

The view that God creates humans' actions is rejected by traditional Twelvers.

=== Holy sites ===
Holiest sites in Twelver Shi'ism
sanctuary	location
Masjid al-Haram	Mecca
Al-Masjid an-Nabawi	Medina
Al-Haram al-Sharif	Jerusalem
Imam Ali Shrine	Najaf
Imam Husayn Shrine	Karbala
Al-Baqi'	Medina
Jannat al-Mu'alla	Mecca
Sayyidah Zaynab Mosque	Damascus
Al Abbas Mosque	Karbala
Sayyidah Ruqayya Mosque	Damascus
Bab al-Saghir Cemetery	Damascus
Imam Reza Shrine	Mashhad
Al-Kadhimiya Mosque	Baghdad
Al-Askari Mosque	Samarra
Fatima Masumeh Shrine	Qom

=== The Prophethood ===
Ja'far al-Sadiq narrates from his fathers that Muhammad, in one of his sermons expressed that "[God] sent to people messengers so they might be His conclusive argument against His creatures and so His messengers to them might be witnesses against them. He sent among them prophets bearing good tidings and warning. " Tabataba'i states that God has perfected the guidance of people through sending the prophets. When the doctrines and practices of the revealed law gets to its perfection, the prophecy comes to an end too. That is why the Quran points out that Islam is the last and the most perfect religion and Muhammad is the "seal of the prophets", he adds. Al-Hilli states that "the Prophets are greater in merit than the angels, because the prophets have conflicts with rational power and they compel it to submit to reason. "

==== Angels ====
Belief in the existence of the angels is one of the articles of Iman. Unseen beings of a luminous and spiritual substance, angels act as intermediaries between God and the visible world. Although superior in substance, angels are inferior to mankind, because man can reflect the image of God. The verse 2:34 implies the superiority of the mankind. God revealed the Quran to Muhammad by Gabriel who was also his guide on Mi'raj. The angels record the deeds of men. They follow the commands of God and do not precede him 21:27.

Izz al-Din Kashani discusses that the angels are different in degree and station. Some of them cling to the Threshold of Perfection, others manage the affairs of the creation. Al-Qazwini, on the base of Quran and hadith, names them as the Bearers of the Throne, the Spirit, governs all the affairs of the earth and heaven according to the principle of creation. Israfil places the spirits in the bodies and will blow the trumpet on the Last Day.

Gabriel took the revelation to Muhammad. Michael, Azrael, the angel of death. The cherubim (al-karrūbiyyūn) just praise God. The angels of seven heavens and the Guardian angels, two of them are concerned with men. The Attendant angels bring blessings upon humans. Munkar and Nakir question the dead in the grave. The journeyers, Harut and Marut are also among them.

==== Revelation ====
Tabataba'i expresses that according to the thesis of general guidance, as the human reason cannot perceive the perfect law of happiness (Sa'adah) and he could not get it through the process of creation, there should be a general awareness of this law and it could be within the reach of every one. He adds there must be people who apprehend the real duties of life and bring them within the reach of human being. Tabataba'i refers to this power of perception, which is other than the reason and the sense, as the prophetic consciousness or the consciousness of revelation as the verse 4: 163 points to this perception namely revelation.

Tabataba'i describes that the reception of revelation, its preservation and its propagation are three principles of ontological guidance. What the prophets got through the revelation was religion which consists of doctrine and practice or method. He adds that with passing of the time and gradual development of the society, the gradual development in the revealed law is apparent. By three ways the speech of God reaches to man, by revelation or divine inspiration; behind a veil, man can hear God's speech but can not hear him; or by a messenger, an angel conveys the inspiration to the man. By the verses 72:26–28 two types of guardians protect the integrity of the revelation: an angel who protects the prophet against any kind of error, God who protects the angels and the prophets.

==== Miracle ====
Tabataba'i defines the miracle as a supernatural event which is shown by the prophet and the friends of God as a challenge to prove the claim of the prophethood and it is by God's permission. He states that the miracle should be according to the demands of the people of his own time. He adds that miracle has an inseparable connection with the claim of the prophethood and it is beyond the intellect and thinking.

By miracle, al-Hilli means "the bringing into existence of something which is abnormal or the removal of something which normally exists, in a way which breaks through normality and which conforms to the claim (of prophethood which is made). " Sobhani regards some differences between miracles and extraordinary acts. He notes that miracles are not teachable and they are done without any prior training. As they are derived from the infinite power of God, the miracles are indisputable. The miracles are of unlimited types. The miracles are often concerned with spiritual matters rather worldly matters.

=== Imamah and Walayah ===
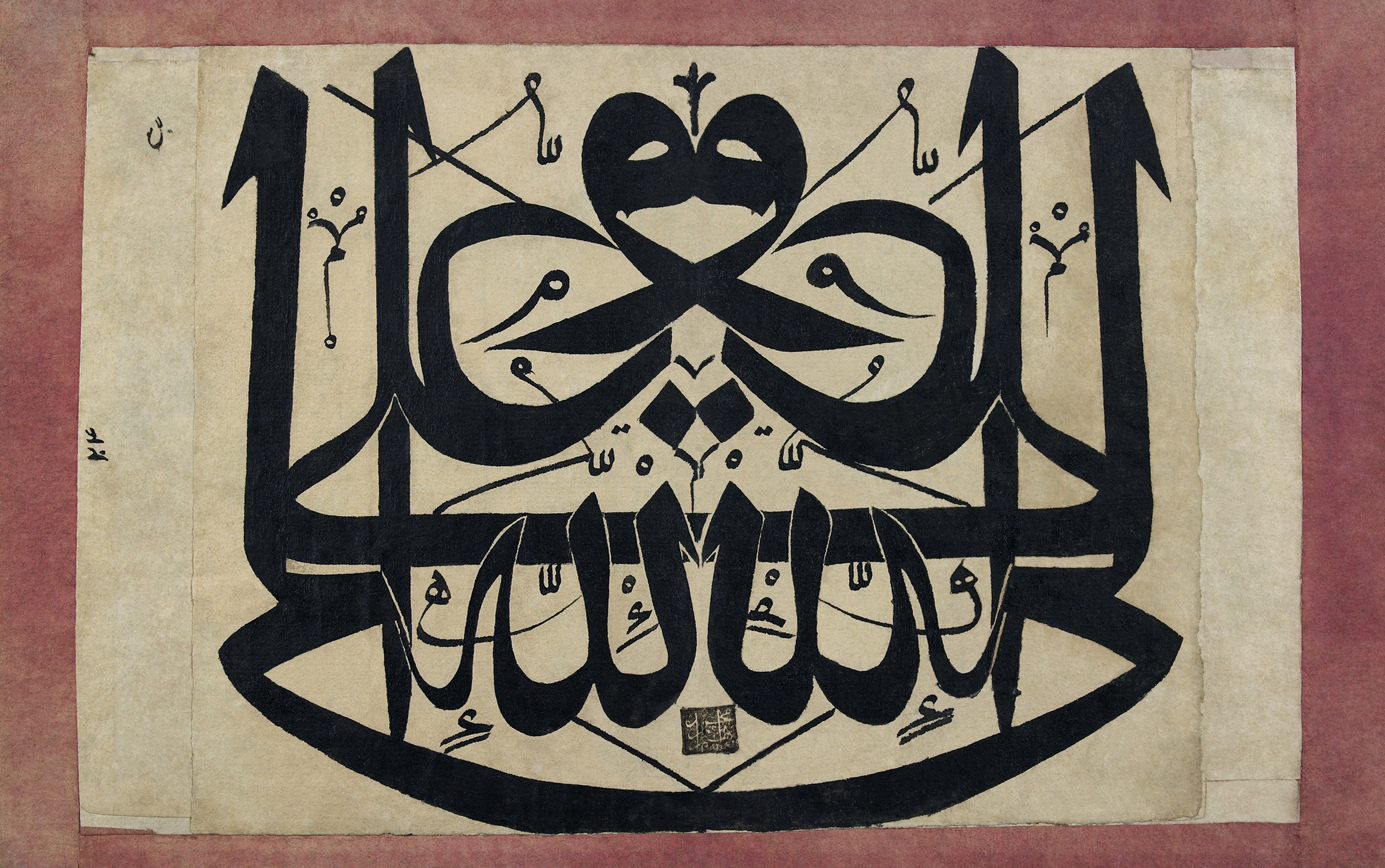
18th century mirror writing in Ottoman calligraphy. Depicts the phrase 'Ali is the vicegerent of God' in both directions.

Shia believe in the trilateral structure of authority; authority of God which is absolute and universal as the verse 3: 26 implies, authority of Muhammad which is legitimized by the grace of God as the verse 7: 158 points to it and the authority of the Imams who are blessed for the leadership of the community through Muhammad as the verses 5: 67 and 5: 3 verifies according to Shia fundamental belief. According to Shia, Imamah is the continuation of the prophetic mission.

Shia believe in the Twelve Imams who are divinely inspired descendants of Muhammad. They must meet these attributes: nass (designation by the previous Imam), Ismah (infallibility), ilm (divine knowledge), Walayah (spiritual guidance). The Twelve Imams are the spiritual and political successors to Muhammad, based on Twelver's belief. It is believed in Shi'a Islam that 'Aql, a divine wisdom, was the source of the souls of the prophets and imams and gave them esoteric knowledge, called Hikmah, and that their sufferings were a means of divine grace to their devotees.

Although the Imam was not the recipient of a divine revelation, but has close relationship with God, through which God guides him, and the imam in turn guides the people. The Imamat, or belief in the divine guide is a fundamental belief in Shi'i Islam and is based on the concept that God would not leave humanity without access to divine guidance.

According to Twelvers, there is always an Imam of the Age, who is the divinely appointed authority on all matters of faith and law in the Muslim community. Ali was the first Imam of this line, and in the Twelvers' view, the rightful successor to Muhammad, followed by male descendants of Muhammad (also known as Hasnain) through his daughter Fatimah. Each Imam was the son of the previous Imam, with the exception of Husayn Ibn Ali, who was the brother of Hasan Ibn Ali. The twelfth and final Imam is Muhammad al-Mahdi, who is believed by the Twelvers to be currently alive, and in hiding.

The Shi'a Imams are seen as infallible. It is an important aspect of Shia theology that they are not prophets (nabi) nor messengers (rasul), but instead carry out Muhammad's message.

==== The Succession to Muhammad ====
Shia believe that with the death of Muhammad, his religious and political authority were inherited to the Imams. Shia consider the Successor as the esoteric interpreter of the revelation and the Divine Law.

With the exception of Zaydis, Shi'ites believe in the Imamate, a principle by which rulers are Imams who are divinely chosen, infallible and sinless and must come from the Ahl al-Bayt regardless of majority opinion, shura or election. They claim that before his death, Muhammad had given many indications, in the event of Ghadir Khumm in particular, that he considered Ali, his cousin and son-in-law, as his successor. For the Twelvers, Ali and his eleven descendants, the twelve Imams, are believed to have been considered, even before their birth, as the only valid Islamic rulers appointed and decreed by God.

Shia Muslims believe that with the exception of Ali and Hasan, all the caliphs following Muhammad's death were illegitimate, and that Muslims had no obligation to follow them. They hold that the only guidance that was left behind, as stated in the hadith of the two weighty things, was the Quran and Muhammad's family and offspring. The latter, due to their infallibility, are considered to be able to lead the Muslim community with justice and equity.

==== Ziyarat and Tawassul ====
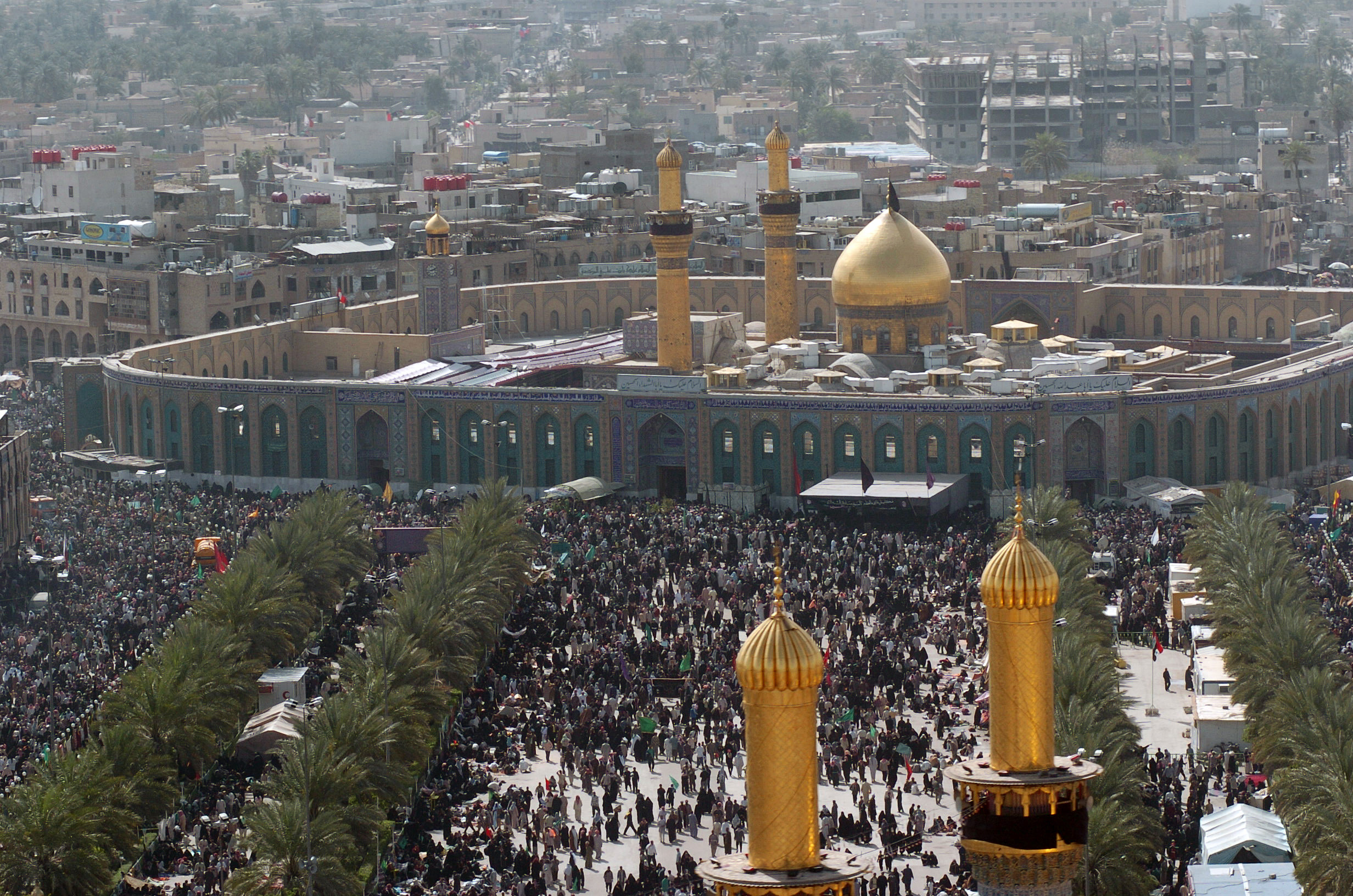
Imam Husayn Shrine in Karbala, Iraq, where the Battle of Karbala took place

Ziyarah (literally: visit) is a religious practice that means to attend before religious leaders or their graves in order to express and indicate reverence/love and acquire spiritual blessings. The visitation of the imams is recommended even by Imams themselves and Shia scholars and jurists from an early period of Shia history. The most popular destinations for Shi'a pilgrims include Najaf and Karbala in Iraq, Qom and Mashhad in Iran, and Sayyidah Zaynab Mosque in Syria.

According to Shi'is, the imams are revered because they had received inspiration and a degree of revelation from Allah.

Tawassul is an Arabic word originated from wa-sa-la- wasilat (Arabic: وسيلة-وسل). The wasilah is a means by which a person, goal or objective is approached, attained or achieved.

For Shi'is: to take advantage of factors to attain the goals is natural but these factors should not be taken as independent from God and should have been established in the Quran and hadith. This means can be anything which causes drawing proximity to God such as prayer, almsgiving.

==== Ismah ====
In Shia theology Ismah means "impeccability", "immunity to sin" and "infallibility". When Ismah is attributed to human beings, the concept means "the ability of avoiding acts of disobedience, in spite of having the power to commit them, " As in Prophets and Imams, Ismah is a Divine grace realized by God's preservation of the infallible, first by endowing them with pure constitution then, following in order, by blessing them with great excellences, giving them firm will against opponents, sending tranquility down upon them (as-Sakinah), and preserving their hearts and minds from sin.

According to the theology of Twelvers, the successor of Muhammad is an infallible human individual who not only rules over the community with justice, but also is able to keep and interpret the Sharia and its esoteric meaning. The words and deeds of Muhammad and the imams are a guide and model for the community to follow; therefore, they must be free from error and sin, and must be chosen by divine decree, or nass, through Muhammad.

According to Twelvers the Islamic prophet Muhammad, his daughter Fatima Zahra; and the Twelve Imams are considered to be infallible under the theological concept of Ismah. Accordingly, they have the power to commit sin but are able to avoid doing so by their nature. The Infallibles are believed to follow only God's desire in their actions, because of their supreme righteousness, consciousness, and love for God. They are also regarded as being immune to error: in practical matters, in calling people to religion, and in the perception of divine knowledge. Shias believe that the Fourteen Infallibles are superior to the rest of creation, as well as to the other major prophets.

From historical viewpoint, Wilferd Madelung claims that the purification of Ahl al-Bayt—the family of Muhammad—is guaranteed by the verse of purification in the Qur'an. Donaldson in his argument believed that the development of the Shi'ite theology in the period between the death of Muhammad and the disappearance of the Twelfth Imam originates the concept of Ismah which adds to its importance. Ann Lambton claims that neither the term nor the concept of Ismah is in the Qur'an or in canonical Sunni hadith. It was apparently first used by the Imamiyyah, perhaps during the beginning of the second century of the Islamic calendar in which they maintained that the Imam must be immune from sin (ma'sum).

According to Hamid Algar, the concept Ismah is encountered as early as the first half of the second century of the Islamic calendar. The Shia scholars of the fourth and the fifth centuries of the Islamic calendar defined the infallibility of Muḥammad and the Twelve Imams in an increasingly stringent form until the doctrine came to exclude their commission of any sin or inadvertent error, either before or after they assumed office.

==== The occultation ====
According to Twelvers, the conditions under the Abbasids caused Hasan al-Askari to hide the birth of his son, al-Mahdi.

=== The day of resurrection ===
By Shia theological doctrine, since the people have come from God, they will go back to God, and it is related to people's reaction to the prophecy. They argue that according to the Quran, 23: 115, God, whose actions are the absolute truth, does not create a man without any purpose. While the quality of this world makes the recompense impossible, the Justice of God necessitates that every one be recompensed according to his own actions. Tabataba'i describes the death as a transfer from one stage of life to another eternal stage. The verse 21:47 points to the precision of the scales of justice by which the deeds and intentions of people are weighed.

==== The return (Raj'a) ====
Twelvers believe in the return; the term refers to the revival of a group of Muslims back to this world after the appearance of Mahdi. The base of this belief derives from the revival of the dead in the past communities as mentioned in the Quran and the revival at the Day of Resurrection. Sobhani describes that Resurrection is both of body and spirit. Quran 17: 51, in response to those that ask "Who will restore us", answers: "He who brought you forth the first time. "

In another place, verse 22: 5–6, it is like the revival of the earth in the season of the spring after the winter. He adds the verse 36: 79 implies that the person who is raised up at the Resurrection is the one who was alive on the earth. The purpose of the Resurrection of the body and rejoining the soul is that it experience the rewards and punishments which are sensible and they can not be experienced with the lack of the body. The purpose of spiritual resurrection is to observe those rewards and punishments which are special to the spirit.

==== The day of judgement ====
God will resurrect all human beings and they will stand before God to be questioned about their lives on the world. On this day people are two groups, people who receive their book by their right hand who are the people of paradise and their face is bright and the people who receive their book by their left hand who are the people of Hell and their face is dark. As the verse 41:21 points out, on the Day of Judgement, the ears, eyes and skin of disbelievers will testify against them saying "Allah has caused us to speak – He causes all things to speak."

==== Intercession ====
Belief to the Intercession derives from the Quran, 21: 28, 10: 3, 53: 26 and Sunna. Muhammad, the angels, Imams and martyrs are among the intercessors by God's will. Muhammad has expressed that one of God's gifts to him is the right of intercession of those who have committed major sins. As Quran represents the sons of Jacob asked their father to intercede for them and their father promised to them that he will do it at the promised time.

== Shari'ah (Furu al-Din) ==
According to Nasr, the root of the Shari'ah is Shr' which means road that all the men and women should follow. The Shari'ah or Divine Law of Islam is ritual, legal, ethical, and social aspects of Islam which is the concrete embodiment of the will of God. It governs the life of a Muslim from the cradle to the grave in order to get happiness in the Hereafter. He adds to get into Haqiqah, a Muslim should follow the Shari'ah which resides within the formal law. This interior part of the Shariah is Tariqah.

The Shari'ah consists of Ibadat (worship) which is all the conjunctions that apply to the Islamic rites and muamalat which includes every kind of social, political and economic transactions. The Shari'ah divides all acts into five categories: obligatory (wajib), recommended (mandub), reprehensible or abominable (makruh), forbidden (haram) and acts toward which the Divine Law is indifferent (mubah).

The evaluation of the act is on the base of the Shari'ah. God is the ultimate legislator (the Shari') and the roots of the Shari'ah is in the Quran. The Hadith and Sunnah are the second sources of the Shari'ah and the complements of the Quran. The Shari'ah has immutable principles but is applicable to new situations.

- Salat (Prayer) – meaning "connection", establish the five daily prayers, called namāz in Persian and Urdu.
- Sawm (Fasting) – fasting during the holy month of Ramadhan, called rūzeh in Persian.
- Zakat (Poor-rate) – charity. Zakat means "to purify".
- Khums ("Fifth" of one's savings) – tax.
- Hajj (Pilgrimage) – performing the pilgrimage to Mecca.
- Jihād (Struggle) – struggling to please God. The greater, internal Jihad is the struggle against the evil within one's soul in every aspect of life, called jihād akbār or jihād-un-Nafs. The lesser, or external, jihad is the struggle against the evil of one's environment in every aspect of life, called jihād asghār. This is not to be mistaken with the common modern misconception that this means "Holy War". Writing the truth (jihād bil qalam "struggle of the pen") and speaking truth in front of an oppressor are also forms of jihād.
- Commanding what is just.
- Forbidding what is evil.
- Tawalla – loving the Ahl al-Bayt and their followers.
- Tabarra – dissociating oneself from the enemies of the Ahlu l-Bayt.

=== Shahada (declaration of faith) ===
While sharing the Unity of God and the divine guidance through his messenger Muhammad, Shia maintain that for the spiritual and moral guidance of the community, God instructed Muhammad to designate Ali as the leader of the community which was made public at Ghadir Khumm. Twelvers, along with Sunnis, agree that a single honest recitation of the shahādah in Arabic is all that is required for a person to become a Muslim according to most traditional schools. A vast majority of Twelvers often add ʻAlīyun waliyu l-Lāh (علي ولي الله "Ali is the viceregent of God") at the end of the Shahādah. This testifies that ʻAlī is also the Leader of the Believers along with God and Muhammad, proof of which Shi'a theologians find in the Qur'an.^{[Quran 5:55]}

=== Prayer ===
The canonical prayers are the most central rite of Islam which is incumbent on all Muslims, both male and female, from the age of adolescence until death. The prayers must be performed in the direction of the Ka'bah in Mecca five times a day: in the early morning, between dawn and sunrise; at noon; in the afternoon; at sunset; and at night before midnight.

The call to prayer (adhan) and ritual ablution (wudu) are preceded before the prayer and it can be performed on any ritually clean ground whether outdoors or indoors as long as one has the permission of the owner. The units (rak'ah) of prayer are two in the morning, four at noon, four in the afternoon, three in the evening, and four at night. Shia perform prayers on especial occasions like fear, joy, thanksgiving and at the pilgrimages and at the end of Ramadan.

There are minor differences between Sunnis and Twelvers in how the prayer ritual is performed. During the purification ritual in preparation for prayer, which consists of washing the face, arms, feet, etc. and saying of some prayers, the Shīʻa view wiping the feet with wet hands as sufficient. Also, Shīʻa do not use their fingers to clean inside the ears during the ablution ritual. A prerequisite for purification is that one has to be clean before performing the purification ritual.

During prayer, it is the Jaʻfarī view that it is preferable to prostrate on earth, leaves that are not edible or wood, as these three things are considered purest by Muhammad in hadith specifically mentioning Tayammum. Hence many Shīʻa use a turbah, a small tablet of soil, often taken from the ground of a holy site, or wood during their daily prayers upon which they prostrate.

In the Jaʻfarī view, the hands are to be left hanging straight down the side during the standing position of the prayer. The Jaʻfarī consider the five daily prayers to be compulsory, though the Jaʻfarī consider it acceptable to pray the second and third prayer, and the fourth and fifth prayer, one after the other during the parts of the day where they believe the timings for these prayers to overlap.

=== Fasting ===
Nasr describes that Fasting is abstaining oneself from food, drink and sexual intercourse from the dawn to the sunset during the month of Ramadan. The Fast also requires the abstaining one's mind and tongue away from evil thoughts and words. It is obligatory from the age of adolescence until the time one possesses the physical strength to undertake it. The fast is not obligatory for the sick, those travelling and breast-feeding mothers, but they must make up the lost days when possible.

According to Tabataba'ei, Arabic: الصوم (Fasting) means to abstain oneself from something, which later in the development of the religion was applied to abstaining from some particular things, from break of dawn up to sunset, with intention (niyyah,النّيّة). Fasting results in piety i.e., to abstain oneself from gratifying worldly matters, results in the perfection of the spirit. He adds, one should care about matters which take him away from his Lord: this is called piety. This abstinence from common lawful things causes him to abstain from unlawful things and to come nearer to God. The end of Ramadan comes with the prayer of the Eid after which a sum of money equal to the cost of all the meals not eaten by oneself and one's family during this month is usually given to the poor.

=== Khums and zakah ===
The term zakah is related to the purity in Arabic. It is the annual taxation of one's excess wealth at certain rates for different valuables. It is a form of social welfare program, by which wealth is redistributed and the accumulation of wealth in the hands of a small elite prevented. It is also seen as a ritual purification of one's wealth. Khums (خمس), meaning one fifth, is an annual tax of one-fifth which is levied on net income, after paying all expenses. This tax is to be spent on Muhammad, his family, orphans, the needy and the travelers. Half of the Khums is the share of the Imam which is his inheritance from Muhammad and at the absence of Imam, it is paid to Marja' as the representative of Imam.

The items which are eligible for khums are seven:

1. the profit or the surplus of the income.
2. the legitimate wealth which is mixed with some illegitimate wealth.
3. mines and minerals.
4. the precious stones obtained from sea by diving.
5. treasures.
6. the land which a dhimmi kafir buys from a Muslim.
7. the spoils of war.

Khums is mandatory on seven assets: earned profits, net income (after paying all expenses), Zakat or alms is levied on crops, livestock, gold, silver and cash

In Islamic legal terminology, it means "one-fifth of certain items which a person acquires as wealth, and which must be paid as an Islamic tax". According to Shi'a, the items eligible for khums are referred to as Ghanima (الْغَنيمَة) in the Quran. The Arabic word Ghanima has two meanings

- "spoils of war" or "war booty"
- gain or profit

The Sunni translate this word exclusively as "war booty" or "spoils of war". The Twelvers hold the view that the word Ghanima has two meanings as mentioned above, the second meaning is illustrated by the common use of the Islamic banking term al-ghunm bil-ghurm meaning "gains accompany liability for loss or risk".

Also, in a famous supplication, the supplication after the noon prayer, the person asks God to bestow on him His favors, one of those favors which the person asks is the benefit or gain from every act of righteousness, the word used here is al-ghanima (وَالْغَنيمَةَ مِنْ كُلِّ بِر) this is in accordance with the second meaning of the word.

=== Hajj ===
Hajj is the supreme pilgrimage of the Muslim to the Ka'bah in Mecca. This rite involves circumambulation around the Ka'bah, certain movements, prayers, and the sacrifice of an animal in Mecca and adjoining holy areas according to Sunnah. Muslims believe that if the Hajj was performed by sincerity, their sins will be forgiven by God. It is performed in the month of Dhu'l-hijjah and is obligatory for all the Muslims who possess physical and financial ability. There is also lesser Hajj or hajj al-'umrah which is performed on the remaining of the year.

=== Jihad ===
According to Nasr, Jihad literally means effort but in the path of God in the whole of life. Shia associates the doctrine of Jihad directly to the Walayah or allegiance to the Imamah, i.e., it is Imam who can distinguish the situation which necessitates the Jihad and just this kind of Jihad may cause the entry to the paradise. Nasr states that as equilibrium, both outward and inward, is the prerequisite for the spiritual flight, all Muslims should carry out Jihad against any outward and inward forces to maintain equilibrium.

The outward Jihad is related to the defense of the Muslim world against non-Islamic forces. It also includes the defense of one's honor, family and rights and establishing justice in the whole environment. But this lesser jihad should be completed by a greater Jihad which is war against all forces that are against the nobility of the human. He adds that from the spiritual point of view all the pillars of Islam like Shahadah, prayer ... are the weapons for the practice of this inner Jihad. So inner Jihad is the path for the realization of the One who is the ultimate message of the Islam. This inner Jihad continues until every breath of man echoes that reality who is the origin of every thing and all things return to him.

Nasr adds that every religious deed is Jihad because it is a striving between one's passionate soul(nafs) and the demands of the immortal spirit. Islam sees Jihad as a care against every thing which distracts one from God. Shia believe that Jihad as defense is legitimate not as aggression. The Jihad can not be done against the innocent and the enemy should be treated with Justice and kindness and Jihad should be carried out on the basis of truth not on the basis of anger. The killing of women, children, even animals and the destruction is forbidden in Jihad.

=== Tawalla and Tabarru' ===
Love of Muhammad is incumbent upon all Muslims and is the key for the love of God. To love God needs that God love the one and God does not love the one who does not love his messengers.

=== Commanding what is just and Forbidding what is evil ===
In addition to leading a virtuous life, a Muslim should enjoin all other Muslims to do the same and to avoid all vices prohibited.

== Clergy and taqlid ==
Generally, clergy in Twelver Shi'a have exerted much more authority in their religious community than the Sunni ulema in theirs. Usooli and Akhbari Shia Twelver Muslims believe that the study of Islamic literature is a continual process, and is necessary for identifying all of God's laws. Twelver Shia Muslims believe that the process of finding God's laws from the available Islamic literature will facilitate in dealing with any circumstance. They believe that they can interpret the Qur'an and the Twelver Shi'a traditions with the same authority as their predecessors. This process of ijtihad has provided a means to deal with current issues from an Islamic perspective.

Starting in the 19th century, with the Usooli movement (who now make up the overwhelming majority of Twelver Shia clergy) Shia considered it obligatory for Muslims without expertise in Islamic jurisprudence to turn to a mujtahid (an expert in Islamic jurisprudence) for "advice and guidance and as a model to be imitated" when seeking to determine Islamically correct behavior, during the occultation of the Mahdi, (for the past 1000+ years). On "matters of belief" or usulu 'din, it is obligatory for Shi'a to train themselves. Usooli Shia believe the 12th Imam, ordered them to follow the scholars (Fuqaha) who: "...guard their soul, protect their religion, and follow the commandments of their master (Allah)..."

Obedience to, or "imitation" of, a mujtahid is known as Taqlid. The mujtahid they follow or emulate is known as a Marja' Taqleedi. Those who imitate/emulate/obey him are known as muqallid. Where a difference in opinion exists between the maraji', each of them provides their own opinion and the muqallid (their followers) will follow their own marja's opinion on that subject.

=== Who and where ===
Several senior Grand Ayatollahs preside over hawzas (religious seminaries). The hawzas of Qom and Najaf are the preeminent centers for the training of Shia clergymen. However, there are other smaller hawzas in many other cities around the world, the biggest ones being Karbala (Iraq), Isfahan (Iran) and Mashhad (Iran).

There are 56 Maraji living worldwide as of 2023, mostly residing in Najaf and Qom. The most prominent among them are Hossein Vahid Khorasani, Mousa Shubairi Zanjani, Sayyid Sadeq Rohani, Naser Makarem Shirazi, Sadiq Hussaini Shirazi, Hossein Noori Hamedani and Abdollah Javadi-Amoli in Qom; Ali al-Sistani, Muhammad al-Fayadh, Muhammad Saeed al-Hakim and Bashir al-Najafi in Najaf.

==== Dispute over Marja al-taqlid al-mutlaq ====
In the early 1990s, the leading marja', Abu al-Qasim al-Khoei, died and Ali al-Sistani, "emerged" as the marja al-mutlaq or highest Marja' in the world of Shia Islam. According to Mohamad Bazzi, Al-Sistani's word "on religious matters carries the most weight" among Shia.

However, in 1994, the regime of the Islamic Republic of Iran (IRI) declared it was the Supreme Leader of Iran, Ali Khamenei who was "the single marja˓ al-taqlid" or "undisputed marja˓".

According to Mohamad Bazzi, this was a bid "to displace" Ali Sistani, the true Marja al-taqlid al-mutlaq, "and his allies in Najaf", but it "failed" because Khamenei "had modest religious credentials (he was only elevated to the rank of ayatollah after Khomeini's death, so he could assume the post of supreme leader). Faced with Baathist persecution and an Iranian power grab, Sistani was able to retain his position." Gleave does not mention al-Sistani but states that Khamenei's "position as the Marja˓ al-taqlid" has "remained a matter of dispute".

== Differences ==
=== Dissimulation (Taqiyya) ===
By Shia, acting according to religion is incumbent on everyone, but if the expression of a belief endangers one's life, honor and property, he can conceal his belief as the verse 16: 106 implies. It is as a weapon for the weak before the tyrants. If Dissimulation causes the disappearance of the religion or the fundamentals of the religion, it is forbidden and Muslims are to give up their lives but if there is no advantage in their being killed, it is to dissimulate. There is no place for Dissimulation regarding the teaching of the doctrines of the religion. As Shia has been a minority under the rule of regimes who were in hostility to their beliefs, they choose to be cautious to prevent their extinction.

Henry Corbin, states that "the practice was instituted by the Imams themselves, not only for reasons of personal safety, but as an attitude called for by the absolute respect for high doctrines: nobody has strictly the right to listen to them except those who are capable of listening to, and comprehending, the truth. "

=== Mut'ah: Temporary marriage ===
Nikāḥ al-Mut'ah, Nikah el Mut'a (Arabic: نكاح المتعة, also Nikah Mut'ah literally, "marriage of pleasure"), or sighah, is a fixed-time marriage which, according to the Usuli Shia schools of Shari'a (Islamic law), is a marriage with a preset duration, after which the marriage is automatically dissolved. It has many conditions that can be considered as pre-requisite, similar to that of permanent marriage. However, it is regarded as haram (prohibited) by Sunnis. This is a highly controversial fiqh topic; Sunnis and Shi'a hold diametrically opposed views on its permissibility. However, some Sunni Muslims recognize Nikah Misyar.

Mutah is claimed to have existed during the time of Muhammad, and during a portion of his time, it was not prohibited. On this basis, Shias believe that anything that was allowed during the time of Muhammad should remain allowed after. Mut'ah was allegedly practiced from the time of revelation to Muhammad until the time of Umar as the verse 70: 29 points to it.

== Jurisprudence (Fiqh) ==
According to Ja'fari jurisprudence, Sharia is derived from the Qur'an and the Sunnah. The difference between Sunni and Shīʻa Sharia results from a Shīʻa belief that Muhammad assigned ʻAlī to be the first ruler and the leader after him (the Khalifa or steward). This difference resulted in the Shīʻa:

1. Following hadith from Muħammad and his descendants the 12 Imāms.
2. This means some traditions accepted by Sunni—the "examples", verdicts, and ahādīth of Abu Bakr, Umar and Uthman ibn Affan (who are considered by Sunnīs to be the first three Caliphs) -- are not accepted by Shia.
3. Attributing the concept of the masūm "infallibility" to the Twelve Imāms or The Fourteen Infallibles (including Muhammad and his daughter Fatimah) and accepting the examples and verdicts of this special group.

=== Akhbari and Usuli schools ===
Akhbari reject the function of the Mujtahid, comparing to the authority of Imam. Mullah Muhammad Amin al-Astarabadi (d. 1626–27) preached that the ijtihad was unnecessary as the instructions of the Imam were sufficient guidance for Muslims. Akhbaris rely only on the hadith of the prophet and the Imams.

On the other hand, Usulis depicted themselves as "a living continuous leadership of the believers" with "flexibility regarding legal and especially political questions", which they regard as necessary because the knowledge provided by hadith is non-systematic and purely doctrinal lacking rational judgement. Usuli implies the doctrine of Usul which means the principle of the Jurisprudence, and Ilm al-Usul concerns with establishing the legal standards on the basis of the four foundations of Quran, hadith, Ijma' and Aql. (Ijma' is the unanimous consensus.) Aql, in Shia Jurisprudence, is applied to four practical principles namely bara'at (immunity), ihtiyat (precaution), takhyir (selection), and istishab (continuity in the previous state) which are applied when other religious proofs are not applicable.

=== Governance and the Guardianship of the jurisprudent ===
The first Shi'a regime, the Safavid dynasty in Iran, propagated the Twelver faith, made Twelver's law the law of the land, and patronized Twelver scholarship. For this, Twelver ulema "crafted a new theory of government" which held that while "not truly legitimate", the Safavid monarchy would be "blessed as the most desirable form of government during the period of awaiting" for Muhammad al-Mahdi, the twelfth imam. In general, the Shi'a adhered to one of three approaches towards the state: either full participation in government, i.e., attempting to influence policies by becoming active in politics, or passive cooperation with it, i.e. minimal participation, or else most commonly, mere toleration of it, i.e. remaining aloof from it.

This changed with the 1979 Iranian Revolution where the Twelver Ayatollah Ruhollah Khomeini and his supporters established a new theory of governance for the Islamic Republic of Iran, based on the idea that Islamic jurists are "legatees" of Muhammad and the Imams, that in the absence of an infallible Imam, a capable jurist (faqih) takes the responsibility of leadership of the community. Khomeini believed himself to be just such a person and with the enormous support he had as the revolution's leader he became the vali-e faqih (guardian jurist) of the Islamic Republic of Iran.

While not all Twelvers accept this theory, it is uniquely Twelver and the basis of the constitution of Iran, the largest Shi'a Muslim country, where the Supreme Leader must be an Islamic jurist.

Khomeini and his supporters taught that rather than being new, his theory was supported by Shi'i hadith and earlier scholars, (if properly understood), but had been deliberately suppressed by enemies of Islam. According to Khomeini, the basis of this juristic authority is derived from the Imamate as the expansion of the prophecy and knowledge (ilm) which is also the basis for the religious and political authority of the Imam. He taught that without Islamic government ruled by the leading jurist/faqih, Islam would whither and decline. God's absolute authority is the foundation of Twelvers political thought, though every one who wishes to have authority must be assigned by Him.

As evidence for this theory, he quoted Hakim (Wali) Ja'far as-Sadiq who Hadith relate as saying: "I have appointed him a hakim over you. If such a person orders (judges) according to our ruling and the person concerned does not accept it, then he has shown contempt for the ruling of God and rejects us; and he who rejects us, actually rejects Allah and such a person is close to association [Shirk] with Allah." Regarding the priority of the guardianship over all other religious law, Khomeini states that:

"The government, or the absolute guardianship (alwilayat al-mutlaqa) that is delegated to the noblest messenger of Allah, is the most important divine law and has priority over all other ordinances of the law. If the powers of the government be restricted to the framework of ordinances of the law then the delegation of the authority to Muhammad would be a senseless phenomenon."

Shaykh al-Saduq and Shaykh al-Tusi transmit the hadith that Muhammad al-Mahdi, in response to Ishaq ibn Yaqub, through Muhammad ibn Uthman al-Umari expresses that: "As for the events that may occur (al-hawadith al-waqi'a) [when you may need guidance] refer to the transmitters (ruwat) of our teachings who are my hujjah (proof) to you and I am the Proof of God (Hujjatullah) to you all. " Ja'afar al-Sadiq, pointing to verse 4: 60, forbids referring to tyrannical government for all the times. "

The idea of jurist authority is based on the belief that establishing an ideal society without any aid from God's revelation, is not possible. According to Usuli Twelvers, Juristic authority emphasizes on the role of Shari'a in society. According to Al-Murtaza, on certain conditions holding office on behalf of the true Leaders is obligatory: to enable the office to order what is right and forbid what is wrong, to protect the Shi'ites, the Shi'ites are threatened to death, otherwise.

Khomeini and his followers taught that traditionally Twelver Shia consider 'Ali ibn Abi Talib and the subsequent eleven Imams not only religious guides but political leaders, based on a hadith where Muhammad passes on his power to command Muslims to Ali. Since the last Imam, Muhammad al-Mahdi, went into "occultation" in 941 and is not expected back until end times, this left Shi'a without religiously sanctioned governance.

=== Ijtihad and Taqlid (accepting a scholar's verdict) ===
The use of Ijtihad and Taqlid associates with a religious and judicial problem that its answer is not in the Quran and hadith. Regarding Ijtihad, Halm explains that while the religious material is limited, what procedure should be taken if a problem arises. Here human reason comes in; God gave reason to human to discover His Will. If no answer was given by tradition (naql) the intellect (aql) should come in. This rational effort to find the solutions for the temporary issues is called Ijtihad (making of an effort). It is derived from the word jihad which means the struggle for the attainment of God's Will on earth.

The participle of ijtihad is mujtahid (the person who makes effort). They should master the Arabic language and be familiar with the foundations of Quran and hadith. They also should know the principles of Jurisprudence and logic. The remaining other believers, who are not expert, exercise taqlid which means authorization; that is common believers authorize the experts to make decisions for them. If the mujtahid make a mistake, the believer is not responsible for his error. Though ijtihad makes the Shia theology flexible.

The traces of Ijtihad refers back to the time of Imams when they trained scholars to answer to the judicial problems of the people. As al-Baqir said to Aban ibn Taghlib: "Sit down at the door of the mosque and pronounce fatwa (judgement) to the people ..." According to Nasr, the mujtahids acted as the guard against tyrannical government and they had religious and social functions. Al-Karaki narrates a hadith from his teachers that the scholar is the guardian of the religion, successor of the Imam and he should draw conclusions from the sources by the reasoning.

== Calendar ==
Twelvers celebrate the following annual holidays:

- Eid ul-Fitr (عيد الفطر), which marks the end of fasting during the month of Ramadan and falls on the first day of Shawwal.
- Eid al-Adha, which marks the end of the Hajj or pilgrimage to Mecca, starts on the 10th day of Dhu al-Hijjah.

The following holidays are observed by Twelvers unless otherwise noted:

- The Mourning of Muharram or Remembrance of Muharram and Ashurah (عاشوراء) for Shia commemorate Imam Husayn ibn Ali's martyrdom in the Battle of Karbala. Imam Husayn was grandson of Muhammad, who was killed by Yazid ibn Muawiyah, the second Caliph of the Umayyad Caliphate (and the first one by heredity). Sunnis also commemorate Imam Husayn ibn Ali's martyrdom, but do not engage in the spectacle displayed by Shi'as.
- Arba'een (Arabic word for forty) commemorates 40th day of Imam Husain's martydom (40th day is an auspicious day for any deceased as per Islam), remembering the suffering of Imam Husayn and his household, the women and children. After Husayn was killed, his household was marched over the desert, from Karbala (central Iraq) to Shaam (Damascus, Syria). Many children (some of whom were direct descendants of Muhammad) died of thirst and exposure along the route. Arba'een occurs on the 20th of Safar, 40 days after Ashurah.
- Milad al-Nabi, Muhammad's birth date, is celebrated by the Shia on the 17th of Rabi' al-awwal, which coincides with the birth date of the sixth imam, Ja'far al-Sadiq.
- Mid-Sha'aban is the birth date of the 12th and final imam, Muhammad al-Mahdi. It is celebrated by Twelvers on the 15th of Sha'aban. Many Shia fast on this day to show gratitude.
- Eid al-Ghadeer celebrates Ghadir Khum, the occasion when Muhammad announced Ali's imamate before a multitude of Muslims. Eid al-Ghadeer is held on the 18th of Dhu al-Hijjah.
- Eid Al-Mubahila celebrates a meeting between the Ahl al-Bayt (household of Muhammad) and a Christian deputation from Najran. Al-Mubahila is held on the 24th of Dhu al-Hijjah.
- Fatimiyya commemorates the martyrdom Fatima ibn Muhammad, the daughter of Muhammad on 3rd Jamdi ul Akhar. The shia believes that Fatima was killed by group led by second caliph of Rashidun caliphate Umar ibn Al Khattab.

== Notable scholars ==
Marja' are the supreme legal authority for Twelvers. Some of the historical and notable scholars include Mulla Sadra, Muhammad Baqir Majlisi, Muhammad ibn Ya'qub al-Kulayni, Al-Shaykh al-Saduq, Al-Shaykh Al-Mufid, Shaykh Tusi, Nasir al-Din al-Tusi, and Al-Hilli.

== See also ==
- Bada'
- Ismailism
- List of Shia books
- List of Shia dynasties
- List of Shia scholars of Islam
- List of Shia Muslims
- List of Shia Muslim flags
- List of converts to Shia Islam
- Persecution of Shia Muslims
- Rafida
- Zaydism
- Twelver Shia holy days
