= Abu Sahl Isma'il ibn Ali al-Nawbakhti =

Iranian Shia Muslim scholar (died 924)

Ismā‘īl ibn ‘Alī, Abū Sahl al-Nawbakhtī
- Died: 923

Academic work
- School or tradition: Shia Islam
- Influenced: Abu Muhammad al-Hasan ibn Musa al-Nawbakhti

Ismā‘īl ibn ‘Alī, Abū Sahl al-Nawbakhtī (Note: Ṭūsī (p. 57) gives the name Nūbukhtī.) was the great scholar of the Imamah, and the uncle of Abu Muhammad al-Hasan ibn Musa al-Nawbakhti. Abū Sahl died in 923.

== Life ==
Abū Sahl Ismā‘īl ibn ‘Alī ibn Nawbakht was one of the great men of the Shi‘ah. Abū al-Ḥusayn al-Nāshī said that he was his teacher. He was a virtuous and learned theologian, who presided over a group of theologians. He had an idea about the qā’im (Note: Reference to Shi‘ah belief in the lawful caliph’s direct descent from the Prophet of Islam.) of the family of Muḥammad which no one had before him. (Note: Translation from ambiguous idiomatic Arabic. Alternative interpretation: “which he did not adopt hastily.”) He used to say: “I say to you the [lawful] imam was Muḥammad ibn al-Ḥasan (Note: The 12th Shi‘i imam, the son of al-Ḥasan al-‘Askari, was called Muḥammad al-Muntaẓar (“the Expected”), said to have disappeared at Samarra in 878, but the faithful await his return, which is called “Qā’im al-Zamān.”) and, although he died hidden, there has arisen in the cause (Note: Translation that follows take from the Tonk MS of al-Fihrist which is clearer than the other versions.) during the concealment his son, and so will his son’s issue be concealed, until God consummates his dominion by causing him to appear.” Abū Ja‘far Muḥammad ibn ‘Alī al-Shalmaghānī, called Ibn Abī al-‘Azāqir (d. 934), summoned him to opposition, promising miracles and supernatural visions. Abū Sahl had a bare spot on his forehead like baldness, so he sent the messenger with this reply: “I ask only one miracle of your master, that he should make hair grow on my forehead; then I can believe him.” The messenger did not return. (Note: The Tonk MS of al-Fihrist has “He returned to his master, but did not come back to him,” that is, to Abū Sahl.)

Al-Nadīm tells a very similar story about Al-Ḥusayn ibn Mansūr al-Hallāj who was in prison when he sent a messenger to appeal for Abū Sahl's help. However the reply came, “I am the head of a sect with thousands of followers, who will follow him if I follow him. So make hair grow on my forehead, for the hair there has disappeared. I want nothing else from him.” The messenger never returned to him.

== Works ==
Al-Fihrist lists the following among his books: (Note: Cf. titles in Ṭūsī, pp. 57—58.)

The Fulfilment, about the imamate; Warning (Prophecy), about the imamate; Refutation of the Ghulāt; Refutation of Ṭāṭarī, concerning the imamate; Refutation of ‘Īsā ibn Abān, about legal interpretation; (Note: Flügel and MS 1934 have al-libās (“clothing”); Ṭūsī is most likely to be correct with al-ijtihād (‘legal interpretation’).) Refutation of the Epistle of al-Shāfi‘ī; Ideas; Sessions; (Note: Al-Ṭūsī, pp. 57-58, also includes titles: His Sessions with al-Jubbā’ī and Sessions with Thabit ibn Qurrah.) Knowledge; Confirmation of the Epistle (Confirmation of the Prophetic Mission); Refutation of Those Upholding the Attributes; Emergence of the World; (Note: Even though Flügel has Ḥadath al-‘Ālam (“New Event of the World”), Dodge follows Ṭūsī’s translation, pp. 57-58, Ḥudūth al-‘Ālam (“Emergence of the World”), Al-Ṭūsī, p. 58, notes that the following title refers to the Jabarīyah.) Refutation of Whoever Speaks of the Created [the Qur’an]; The Word, about man; (Note: Flügel and MS 1934 have al-insān (“man”), whereas al-Ṭūsī, p. 58, has al-ansāb (“idols”).) The Vanity of Analogy; (Note: The more conservative jurists believed that legal decisions should depend upon the Qur’ān and Ḥadīth, regarding analogy as not truly authoritative.) Narrative and What Is Told; Refutation of the Book, “Arousing Wisdom” (Ba‘th al-Ḥikmah), against Ibn al-Rāwandī; Refutation of “The Crown” (Al-Taj), against Ibn al-Rāwandī—it is known as Kitāb al-Shibk; (Note: Al-Ṭūsī, p. 58, explains that the title Kitāb al-Shibk (“The Book of the Whirl or of Entanglement”) probably refers to the constellations, responded to The Book of the Crown (“Kitāb al-Tāj”) about the world and eternity. Flügel has Kitāb al-Sabak, al-sabak, about smelting.) Refutation of Legal Interpretation by Personal Opinion, against [Ibn] al-Rāwandī; Attributes. Abū Sahl al-Nawbakhtī's brother surnamed Abū Ja‘far was a theologian of al-Nawbakhtī's doctrine.

== Sources ==
- Nadīm (al-), Abū al-Faraj Muḥammad ibn Isḥāq (1970). Dodge, Bayard (ed.). The Fihrist of al-Nadim; a Tenth-Century Survey of Muslim Culture. Translated by Bayard Dodge. New York & London: Columbia University Press.
- Ṭūsī (al-), Abū Ja’far Muḥammad ibn al-Ḥasan (1885). Sprenger, Aloys (ed.). "Fihrist al-Ṭūsī (Tusy's list of Shy'ah Books and 'Alam al-Hoda's Notes on Shy'ah Biography)". Bibliotheca Indica (71, 91, 107). Calcutta: Asiatic Society of Bengal, Baptist Mission Press.
- Mas‘ūdī (al-), Abū al-Ḥasan ‘Alī ibn al-Ḥusayn (1869) [1861]. Kitāb Murūj al-Dhahab wa-Ma'ādin al-Jawhar (Les Prairies d'or ) (in Arabic and French). Translated by Meynard (de), C. Barbier; Courteille (de), Pavet. Paris: Imprimerie impériale.
