= Islam and Revolution =

Set of writings by Ruhollah Khomeini

- Author: Ruhallah Khomeini
- Language: Persian

Islam and Revolution (Persian: اسلام و انقلاب) is a two-volume set of writings by Ayatollah Ruhollah Khomeini, which contain a collection of his speeches and writings.

== Islam and Revolution I: Writings and Declarations ==
The first volume covers the years 1941 to 1980, and was compiled and translated from Persian by Hamid Algar. Pages 25 to 166 are devoted to Islamic Government (Hokumat-e Islami: Velayat-e faqih), Khomeini's treatise on how government should be run in accordance with traditional Islamic sharia, and that this will require a leading Islamic jurist (faqih) to provide political "guardianship" (wilayat or velayat) over the people. The book also contains Lectures on "the Supreme Jihad" and Surat al-Fatiha, and speeches and declarations.

Khomeini's writings reflect a belief in a theocracy, in which the government should be dictated by Islam. He believes that outside "imperialists":

...regarded it necessary to work for the extirpation of Islam in order to attain their ultimate goals.

He discusses how Iran's constitution was influenced by Belgian, French, and British legal codes in order to deceive the people and keep them from their Islamic faith. He contends that Islam has all the answers to society, economy, law, politics, and the metaphysical. Khomeini writes:

There is not a single topic in human life for which Islam has not provided instruction and established a norm.

== Islam and Revolution II ==
The second volume containing writings from 1980 to 1989, the year of Khomeini's death, remains unpublished.

== Translations ==
A translation of Writings and Declarations into English, by Hamid Algar, was published by Methuen.
