= Guardianship of the Islamic Jurist =

Shia Islamic guardianship concept

The Guardianship of the Islamic Jurist (Persian: ولایت فقیه, romanized: Velâyat-e Faqih, also Velayat-e Faghih; Arabic: وِلاَيَةُ ٱلْفَقِيهِ, romanized: Wilāyat al-Faqīh), colloquially referred to as Rahbari (Persian: رهبری, lit. 'The leadership'), is a concept which holds that until the reappearance of the "infallible Imam" (sometime before Judgement Day), the religious and social affairs of the Muslim world should be administered by righteous Shi'i jurists (Faqīh).

Wilāyat al-Faqīh is associated in particular with Ruhollah Khomeini and the Islamic Republic of Iran. In a series of lectures in 1970, Khomeini advanced the idea of guardianship in its "absolute" form as rule of the state and society. This version of guardianship now forms the basis of the Constitution of the Islamic Republic of Iran, which calls for a Guardian Jurist (Vali-ye Faqih, وَلِيٌ فَقِيهٌ, Waliyyun Faqīh), to serve as the supreme leader of that country.

Under the "absolute authority of the jurist" (Velayat-e Motlaqaye Faqih), the jurist/faqih has control over all public matters including governance of states, all religious affairs including the temporary suspension of religious obligations such as the salat prayer or hajj pilgrimage. Obedience to him is more important (according to proponents) than performing those religious obligations. Other Shi'i Islamic scholars disagree, with some limiting guardianship to a much narrower scope (e.g., mediating disputes and providing guardianship for orphaned children, the mentally incapable, and others lacking someone to protect their interests). There is minor disagreement over how widely supported Khomeini's doctrine is; that is, whether "the absolute authority and guardianship" of a high-ranking Islamic jurist is "universally accepted amongst all Shi'a theories of governance" and forms "a central pillar of Imami [Shi'i] political thought" (Ahmad Vaezi and Taqi Yazdi), or whether there is no consensus in favor of the model of the Islamic Republic of Iran, neither among the public in Iran (Alireza Nader, David E. Thaler, and S. R. Bohandy), nor among most religious leaders in the leading centers of Shia thought, such as Qom and Najaf (Ali Mamouri).

== Terminology ==
=== Arabic and Persian ===
Arabic language phrases associated with Guardianship of the Jurist, such as Wilāyat al-Faqīh, Wali al-Faqīh, are widely used, Arabic being the original language of Islamic sources such as the Quran, hadith, and much other literature. The Persian language translations, such as Velayat-e Faqih and Vali-e-faqih, are also commonly used in discussion about the concept and practice in Iran, which is both the largest Shi'i majority country, and as the Islamic Republic of Iran, is also the one country in the world where Wilāyat al-Faqīh is part of the structure of government.

=== Definitions ===
Wilāyat al-Faqīh/velayat-e faqih is often used to mean Ayatollah Khomeini's vision of velayat-e faqih as essential to Islamic government, giving no further qualification, with those supporting limited non-governmental guardianship of faqih, being described as "rejecting" velayat-e faqih. (Note: Example: "The conflict between the Iranian regime, which believes in velayat-e faqih, and Najaf, which rejects that notion, has made some researchers in Shiite affairs predict the end of the traditional Shiite reference with Sistani's death".) This is common particularly outside of scholarly and religious discussion, and among supporters (e.g. Muhammad Taqi Misbah Yazdi). In more religious, scholarly, and precise discussion, terminology becomes more involved.

Wilayat conveys several meanings which are involved in Twelver Islamic history. Morphologically, Wilāyat is derived from the Arabic verbal root "w-l-y", Wilaya, meaning not only "to be in charge", but “to be near or close to someone or something", to be a friend, etc.

Synonyms include rule, supremacy, sovereignty, guardianship, authority, mandate, governance, rulership, (Note: see, for example, Amir Arjomand 1980; Calder 1982; Enayat 1983; Rose 1983; Mottahedeh 1995; and Akhavi 1996) governorship and province. In another sense, it means friendship and loyalty. (see Wali). (Note: Non-governmental Guardianship in Islam Some definitions of Guardian in Islam (Sunni not Shia) at least in Islamic Nigeria: For Children: "The main role of a legal guardian under the Shari’a is to act in the child's best interests when the child's parents cannot do so. Legal guardians are usually relatives such as an aunt, uncle, or grandparent. This may be due to death, incapacitation, or incarceration for a crime."; Incapacitated adults: "In some situations, adults with severe handicaps may need a legal guardian to care for them and act on their behalf. This is known as an adult guardianship."; Another source (Sohaira Siddiqui) states that Hedaya (a 12th-century legal manual of Hanafi fiqh by Burhan al-Din al-Marghinan), "states that there are three forms of guardianship: 1. Guardianship for contracting marriage; 2. Guardianship of minor persons for custody and education; and; 3. Guardianship of the property of minors.)

In Islam, jurists or experts in Islamic jurisprudence are Faqīh, (plural Fuquaha).

For those who support a government based on rule of a faqih, Wilāyat al-Faqīh has been translated as "rule of the jurisconsult," "mandate of the jurist," "governance of the jurist", "the discretionary authority of the jurist". More ambiguous translations are "guardianship of the jurist", "trusteeship of the jurist". (Shaykh Murtadha al-Ansari and Abu al-Qasim al-Khoei, for example, would talk of the "guardianship of the jurisprudent", not "the mandate of the jurisprudent".)

Some definitions of uses of the term “Wilayat” (not necessarily involving jurists) in Islamic jurisprudence (fiqh) terminology (or at least Twelver terminology) are:

- Wilayat al-Qaraba—authority (Wilayat) given to a father or paternal grandfather over minors and the mentally ill.
- Wilayat al-Qada’—authority given to a just and capable faqih during the absence of the Imam to judge "amongst the people based upon God's law and revelation", and collect Islamic taxes/tithes (zakat, sadaqa, kharaj).
- Wilayat al-Hakim—the guardian of those who have no guardian; authority given to a regular administrator of justice (hakim), to supervise the interests of a person who does not have a natural guardian and who is unable to take care of his own affairs; such as a mentally ill or mentally disabled person.
- Wilayat al-Usuba—authority over administration of inheritance, and rights of inheritors in Sunni fiqh. (This authority is "not accepted by Imami scholars".)

Regarding jurist involvement in governance, definitions include:

- Wilayat al-Mutlaqa (absolute rule/authority, الولایه المطلقه) of the supreme faqih/jurisprudent, also transliterated as Velayat-e motlagh-e faghih, Velayat-e motlaqeh-ye faqih, also called Wilayat al-Mutlaqa al-Elahiya,
  - has been defined as discretionary authority bestowed on the Islamic prophet Muhammad and on the Imams (Ahmed Vaezi);
  - has been defined (by the Ayatollah Khomeini circa 1988), to mean that the Islamic state has the religious mandate to suspend, if not revoke, substantive divine ordinances (ahkam-e far‘iyeh-ye elahiyeh) such as hajj or fasting if sees the need to;
  - it has also been used (by Iranian conservatives circa 2010) to mean that at least in the case of the Islamic Republic of Iran, the head faqih has "the absolute right to make decisions for the state", notwithstanding the desires of any elected office holders or institutions or the general public. It is a "new term", applied by Khomeini "publicly", and "enshrined in the constitution of Islamic Iran" in 1990.
- Wilayat al-Muqayada ("conditional" authority" of the faqih/jurisprudent) "restricts the right of the faqih for issuing governmental orders" to "permissibility cases" (mubahat), which must not be "in opposition" to "obligatory Islamic laws.
- Wilayat al-Amma ("universal authority" of the faqih/jurisprudent). Supporters of this concept believe orders given by a jurist holder of "wilayat al-amma" are not restricted "to merely the administration of justice". They "may issue orders" which are "incumbent upon all Muslims, even other fuqaha, to obey". They have the "right and duty to lead the Shi’a community and undertake the full function and responsibilities of an infallible Imam". This is "the highest form of authority (Wilayat) bestowed upon the faqih" according to at least one cleric (Ahmed Vaezi). (Note: This editor could not find any explanation giving a difference between Wilayat al-amma ("universal" authority) and Wilayat al-Mutlaqa ("absolute" rule/authority))
- Wilayat al-Siyasiyya—political authority, is one of the elements included in Wilayat al-amma.
- Wilayat at-Takwiniyyah (ontological guardianship). According to Muhammad Taqi Misbah Yazdi, ontological guardianship is "having authority over the entire universe and the rules governing it is basically related to God". This great power was granted by God "to the Prophet of Islam (S) and the infallible Imams (‘a)" and explains why they and certain other "saints" can perform miracles.
- Wilayat at-Tashri‘iyyah (legislative guardianship) Also a term used by Muhammad Taqi Misbah Yazdi, is guardianship involving the "management of society", "which concerns the Prophet (S) and the infallible Imams (‘a)" and with Khomeini's system the ruling guardian jurist.

The term "mullahocracy" (rule by mullahs, i.e. by Islamic clerics) has been used as a pejorative term to describe Wilāyat al-Faqīh as government and specifically the Islamic Republic of Iran.

== History ==
=== Early Islam ===
A foundational belief of Twelver Shi'ism is that the spiritual and political successors of Muhammad are not caliphs (as Sunni Muslims believe), but the "Imams"—a line starting with Muhammad's cousin, son-in-law and companion, Ali (died 661 CE), and continuing with his male descendants. Imams were almost never in a position to rule territory, but did have the loyalty of their followers and delegated some of their functions, to "qualified members" of their community, "particularly in the judicial sphere". In the late 9th century (873-874 CE) the Twelfth Imam, a boy at the time, is reported to have mysteriously disappeared. some historians believe that Shi'i deputy of the imam announced "occultation", whereby the 12th Imam was still alive but had "been withdrawn by God from the eyes of people" to protect his life until conditions were ripe for his reappearance.

As the centuries have gone by and the wait continues (the Hidden Imam's "life has been miraculously prolonged"), the Shi'i community (ummah), has had to determine who, if anyone, has his authority (wilayah) for what functions during the Imam's absence. The delegation of some functions—for example, the collection and disbursement of religiously mandated tithes (zakat and khums) — continued during occultation, but others were limited. Shi'i jurists, and especially al-Sharif al-Murtada (d. 1044 CE), forbade "waging of jihad or (according to some jurists) the holding of Friday prayers", as this power was in abeyance (saqit) until the return of the Imam. Al-Murtada also excluded implementing the penal code (hudud), leading the community in jihad, and giving allegiance to any leader.

For many centuries, according to at least two historians (Moojan Momen, Ervand Abrahamian), Shia jurists have tended to stick to one of three approaches to the state: cooperated with it, trying to influence policies by becoming active in politics, or most commonly, remaining aloof from it. (Note: Abrahamian offers three slightly different options: shunning the authorities as usurpers, accepting them grudgingly, accepting them wholeheartedly -- especially if the state was Shi'i.)

One firm supporter of governance by jurist – Mohammad-Taqi Mesbah-Yazdi—describes the arrival of rule of jurist in Iran as a "revolution" after fourteen centuries of "lamentable" governance in the Islamic world. Other supporters (Ahmed Vaezi) insist that the idea that the governance by jurist is "new", is erroneous. Vaezi maintains it is the logical conclusion of arguments made by high-level Shia faqih of medieval times who argued that high-level Shia faqih be given authority, although their use of Taqiya (precautionary dissimulation) prevents this from being obvious to us.

A significant event in Islamic and especially Shia history was the rise of the Safavid dynasty (1501–1702), which at its height ruled a vast area including modern day Iran and beyond. (Note: (all of what is now Iran, Republic of Azerbaijan, Bahrain, Armenia, eastern Georgia, parts of the North Caucasus including Russia, Iraq, Kuwait, and Afghanistan, as well as parts of Turkey, Syria, Pakistan, Turkmenistan, and Uzbekistan),) The Safavids forcibly converted Iran's population to the state religion of Twelver Shi'ism (which continues to be the religion of a large majority of its population). According to Hamid Algar (a convert to Islam and supporter of Ruhollah Khomeini), under the Safavids, the general deputyship "occasionally was interpreted to include all the prerogatives of rule that in principle had belonged to the imams, but no special emphasis was placed on this." And in the nineteenth century, velayat-e faqih began "to be discussed as a distinct legal topic".

There are other theories by supporters of absolute Wilāyat al-Faqīh of when the doctrine was first advocated or practiced, or at least early examples of it. One argument is that was probably first introduced in the fiqh of Ja'far al-Sadiq (d.765) in the famous textbook Javaher-ol-Kalaam (جواهر الکلام).

The issue was reportedly mentioned by the earliest Shi'i mujtahids such as al-Shaykh Al-Mufid (948–1022), and enforced for a while by Muhaqqiq Karaki during the era of Tahmasp I (1524–1576).

Iranian cleric Mohammad Mahdee Naraqi, or at least his son Molla Ahmad Naraqi (1771–1829 C.E.), are said to have argued that "the scope of wilayat al-faqih extends to political authority", more than a century earlier than Khomeini, and over all aspects of a believer's personal life, but never tried to establish or preach for the establishment of a state based on wilayat al-faqih al-siyasiyah (the divine mandate of the jurisprudent to rule). (Note: Naraqi's era was a period of epic Usuli-Akhbari schism on one hand and the spread of Shaykhi Sufism on the other hand, which was based on Shaikh Ahmad Ahsai's neo-platonic ideas about the Perfect Shia. Naraqi's idea of jurist as the perfect leader was influenced by both debates.) (Note: another source quotes Molla Ahmad Naraqi as being less supportive of the power of the jurist As for the wilaya [authority] in the first sense, that is the view that the (jurist) discretionary authority (to manage the affairs of the Muslims), it is not proved general, except that some people think so because of some traditions ... . But, if one looks at the context of these traditions and at the words preceding and following, then the sense of justice will make him certain that these traditions simply explain the duties of the fuqaha ' (jurists) in respect to religious ordinances (al-ahkam al-shaťiyya); and not their being like the Prophet and the Imams, may the blessings of God be upon them, in the sense that they possess authority over the people in their properties... In brief, one will have to accomplish an impossible task before he can prove that it is obligatory to obey a faqih (jurist) like an Imam in everything except that which is excluded from it by other proofs.) Ahmad Naraqi insisted on the absolute guardianship of the jurist over all aspects of a believer's personal life, but he did not claim jurist's authority over public affairs nor present Islam as a modern political or state system. Nor did he pose any challenge to Fath Ali Shah Qajar, obediently declaring jihad against Russia for the Russo-Persian War (1826–1828), which Iran lost. According to Moojan Momen, "the most" that Naraqi or any Shi'i prior to Khomeini "have claimed is that kings and rulers should be guided in their actions and politics by the Shi'i faqih ..." Naraqi's concept was not passed on by his most famous student, the great Shi'ite jurist Ayatullah Shaykh Murtaza Ansari, who argued against absolute authority of the jurist over all affairs of a believer's life.

According to John Esposito in The Oxford Dictionary of Islam, the first Islamic scholar to advance the theory of the Guardianship of the Islamic Jurist (and who "developed a notion of 'rule of the jurist'") came much later -- Morteza Ansari (~1781–1864). Mohamad Bazzi dates "the concept of wilayat al-faqih" as a model "of political rule" from "the early nineteenth century".

A doctrinal change in most of Twelver Shiism (and particularly Iran) in the late 18th century that gave Shi'i ulama the power to use of ijtihad (i.e., reasoning) in the creation of new rules of fiqh, exclude hadith they considered unreliable, and declaring it obligatory to for non-faqih Muslims (i.e. almost all Muslims) to obey a mujtahid when seeking to determine Islamically correct behavior; was the triumph of the Usuli school of doctrine over the Akhbari school. (Note: By the early nineteenth century, after a long prior evolution, the usuli or mujtahidi school of ulama won out over the rival akhbari school. The latter claimed that individual believers could themselves understand the Quran and the Traditions (akhbar) of Muhammad and the Imams and did not need to follow the guidance of mujtahids, who claimed the right of ijtihad ("effort to ascertain correct doctrine"). The usulis, in contrast, claimed that, although the bases of belief were laid down in the Quran and the Traditions, learned mujtahids were still needed to interpret doctrine for the faithful. As usuli doctrine developed, particularly under Mortaza Ansari, the chief marja'-e taqlid ("source of imitation") of the mid-nineteenth century, every believer was required to follow the rulings of a living mujtahid, and, whenever there was a single chief mujtahid, his rulings took precedence over all others. The usuli ulama have a stronger doctrinal position than do the Sunni ulama. While not infallible, mujtahids are qualified to interpret the will of the infallible twelfth, Hidden Imam.) But along with this doctrinal power came political, economic and social power—control by the ulama over activities left to the government in modern states — the clergy "directly collected and dispersed" the zakat and khums taxes, had "huge" waqf mortmains (religious foundations) as well as personal properties, "controlled most of the dispensing of justice", were "the primary educators, oversaw social welfare, and were frequently courted and even paid by rulers" — but meant that as the nineteenth century progressed "important ulama" and their allies in the bazaar (the traditional commercial and banking sector) came into conflict with the secular authorities, specifically the shah.

=== Colonial and post-colonial era ===
In the late 19th and early 20th centuries, there were two major instances of jurist involvement in politics in Iran, which continued to be the largest Shia-majority state and went on to be a major petroleum exporter.

- A fatwa in 1891 by Mirza Shirazi declaring tobacco forbidden, successfully undermining the overly generous 1890 tobacco concession granted to British imperialists by the monarch of Persia; (Note: giving British control over growth, sale and export of tobacco) and
- the support by Marja' Muhammad Kazim Khurasani (see below), for the democratic Persian Constitutional Revolution of 1905–1911. (Note: "... Khorasani was one of the most important of the clerical supporters of constitutionalism, and his aide, Na'ini (d. 1936) wrote the most important of the treatises legitimating constitutional government")

The Tobacco Protest and Constitutional Revolution (and not the Islamic revolution), have been described both as

- exceptions to apolitical stance of leading Shia jurists (Ervand Abrahamian); and as
- the beginning of the end of a 1000 years of quietism among Shi'i, a "real shift in Shiite political thought", "when Shiites began to see the possibility of freely experimenting with politics" (Khalid bin Sulieman Addadh).

Ayatollah Sheikh Fazlollah Nouri who fought against a democratic law-making parliament in the 1905–1911 Iranian Constitutional Revolution (انقلاب مشروطه), predating Khomeini in supporting rule by sharia and opposing Western ideas in Iran.

=== Khomeini and Guardianship of the Islamic jurist as Islamic government ===
In the 1960s, Ayatollah Ruhollah Khomeini was the leading cleric fighting the monarch (Shah) of the secularist Pahlavi dynasty. In early 1970, when he was exiled to the holy Shia city of Najaf, he gave a series of lectures on how "Islamic Government" required Wilayat Al Faqih. Leading up to the revolution, a book based on the lectures (The Jurist's Guardianship, Islamic Government) was spread widely among his network of followers in Iran.

As a faqih, Khomeini was an expert on Islamic jurisprudence, and had originally supported an interpretation of Velayat-e faqih limited to "legal rulings, religious judgments, and intervention to protect the property of minors and the weak", even when "rulers are oppressive". In his 1941/1943 book Secrets Revealed; he specifically stated "we do not say that government must be in the hands of the faqih".

But in his 1970 book he argued that Faqih should get involved in politics not just in special situations, but that they must rule the state and society, and that monarchy or any other sort of non-Faqih government are "systems of unbelief ... all traces" of which it is the duty of Muslims to "destroy". In a true Islamic state (he maintained) only those who have knowledge of Sharia should hold government posts, and the country's ruler should be the faqih (a guardian jurist, Vali-ye faqih), of the top rank—known as a Marjaʿ—who "surpasses all others in knowledge" of Islamic law and justice — as well as having intelligence and administrative ability. Not only is the rule of Islamic jurists and obedience toward them an obligation of Islam, it is as important a religious obligation as any a Muslim has. "Our obeying holders of authority", like Islamic jurists, "is actually an expression of obedience to God." Preserving Islam — for which Wilāyat al-Faqīh is necessary — "is more necessary even than prayer and fasting".

The necessity of a Jurist leader to serve the people as "a vigilant trustee", enforcing "law and order", is not an ideal to strive for, but a matter of survival for Islam and Muslims. Without him, Islam will fall victim "to obsolescence and decay", as heretics, "atheists and unbelievers" add and subtract rites, institutions, and ordinances from the religion; Muslim society will stay divided "into two groups: oppressors and oppressed"; Muslim government(s) will continue to be infested with corruption, "constant embezzlement"; not just lacking in competence and virtue, but actively serving as agents of imperialist Western powers.

"Foreign experts have studied our country and have discovered all our mineral reserves – gold, copper, petroleum, and so on. They have also made an assessment of our people's intelligence and come to the conclusion that the only barrier blocking their way [in exploiting Iran] are Islam and the religious leadership."

Their goal is

"to keep us backward, to keep us in our present miserable state so they can exploit our riches, our underground wealth, our lands and our human resources. They want us to remain afflicted and wretched, and our poor to be trapped in their misery ... they and their agents wish to go on living in huge palaces and enjoying lives of abominable luxury".

=== Guardianship of the Islamic jurist and the revolution ===
Though in exile, Khomeini, had an extensive network of capable loyalists operating in Iran. As the monarch of Iran lost popularity and revolutionary fervour spread, Khomeini became not only the undisputed leader of the Revolution that overthrew the Shah, but one treated with great reverence, even awe. (Note: Khomeini "had been transformed into a semi-divine figure. He was no longer a grand ayatollah and deputy of the Imam, one who represents the Hidden Imam, but simply 'The Imam'.") While he often emphasized that Iran would become an Islamic state, he "never specified precisely what he meant by that term". Those within his network may have been learning about the necessity of rule by Jurists, but "in his interview, speeches, messages and fatvas" to the public during this period, there is "not a single reference to velayat-e faqih." When asked, Khomeini repeatedly denied Islamic clerics "want to rule" (August 18, 1979), "administer the state" (October 25, 1978), "hold power in the government" (26 October 1978), or that he himself would "occupy a post in the new government" (7 November 1978). (Note: 'The religious dignitaries do not want to rule' Quotation of Khomeini from the Iranian daily Ettelaat, October 25, 1978; `Our intention is not that religious leaders should themselves administer the state,` (October 25, 1978, in Le Monde newspaper "in one of his last interviews before leaving Paris; `The 'ulema themselves will not hold power in the government. They will exercise supervision over those who govern and give them guidance.` -- Khomeini in conversation with a journalist from Reuters (26 October 1978).; Q: Will you occupy a post in the new government?; A: `Neither my age nor my inclination and position would allow me to do something like that.` -- Khomeini in conversation with a journalist from Associate Press, 7 November 1978).: "A day later (8 November 1978) he gave virtually the same answer to a reporter from the United Press and added that he had already stated this many times.) In fact, he could become indignant at the suggestion – "those who pretend that religious dignitaries should not rule, poison the atmosphere and combat against Iran's interests" (August 18, 1979). (Note: Prior to taking power "... Khomeini did not publicly refer to his work on Islamic government"; in fact when asked about "Islamic Government", his entourage went so far as to disown it, "arguing that it was either a SAVAK forgery or the rough notes of an student listener.") As his supporters finalized a new post-revolutionary constitution and it became clear religious dignitaries (and specifically Khomeini) very much were going to rule, it came as shock to moderate and secular Muslims who had been within the fold of his broad movement, but by this time Khomeini's hold on power had been solidified.

=== Constitution of the Islamic Republic of Iran ===
Following the overthrow of the Shah by the Iranian Revolution, a modified form of Khomeini's doctrine was incorporated into the Constitution of Islamic Republic of Iran, adopted by referendum on 2 and 3 December 1979. It established the first country (and so far only) in history to apply the principal of velayat-e faqih to government. The jurist who surpassed all others in learning and justice as well as having intelligence and administrative ability, was Khomeini himself.

"The plan of the Islamic government" is "based upon wilayat al-faqih, as proposed by Imam Khumaynî [i.e. Khomeini]", according to the constitution, which was drafted by an assembly made up primarily by disciples of Khomeini.

While the constitution made concessions to popular sovereignty—including an elected president and parliament—"the Leader" was given "authority to dismiss the president, appoint the main military commanders, declare war and peace, and name senior clerics to the Guardian Council", (a powerful body which can veto legislation and disqualify candidates for office). (Note: Abrahamian states Khomeini was "described as the Supreme Religious Jurist" in the constitution. A translation of the constitution reproduced on constituteproject.org website mentions Khomeini (Khumaynî) several times as the leader of the revolution, "the eminent marji' al-taqlid," "the blossoming of a glorious and massive uprising, which confirmed the central role of Imam Khumaynî as an Islamic leader", "the victorious Islamic Revolution led by the eminent marji' altaqlid, Ayatullah al-'Uzma Imam Khumayni", "Imam Khumayni--quddisa sirruh al-sharif--who was recognised and accepted as marji' and Leader by a decisive majority of the people". It also states that "After the demise of" Khomeini, "the task of appointing the Leader shall be vested with the experts elected by the people." (The constitution never uses the term Supreme Leader, only Leader.))

=== Hezbollah of Lebanon ===
Khomeini's concept of wilayat al-faqih was to be universal and not to be limited to Iran. In one of his speeches, he declared:

We shall export our revolution to the whole world. Until the cry 'There is no god but Allah' resounds over the whole world, there will be struggle.

In the early 1980s, Ayatollah Khomeini sent some of his followers, including 1500 Iranian Islamic Revolutionary Guard Corps (pasdaran) instructors, to Lebanon to form Hezbollah, a Shia Islamist political party and militant group, committed to bringing Islamic revolution and rule of wilayat al-faqih in Lebanon. A large fraction of Lebanon's population was Shia, but had traditionally been subservient to Lebanese Christians and Sunni Muslims. Now they had grown to become the largest confessional group in Lebanon, and over time Hezbollah's para-military wing grew to be considered stronger than the Lebanese army, and Hezbollah itself to be described as a "state within a state". However, by 2008, the goal of transforming Lebanon into something like Iran had been abandoned in favor of "a more inclusive approach".

=== Under the Islamic Republic ===
The establishment of the Islamic Republic and Wilayat al-faqih rule was not without conflict. In his manifesto Islamic Government, Khomeini had warned sternly about measures that Islam will take with "troublesome" groups that damage "Islam and the Islamic state", and noted that Muhammad had "eliminated" one "troublesome group" (i.e. the tribe Bani Qurayza whose men were all executed and women and children enslaved after the tribe collaborated with Muhammad's enemies and later refuse to convert to Islam). (Note: From Islamic Government: "Anyone who rules over the Muslims, or over human society in general, must always take into consideration, the public welfare and interest, and ignore personal feelings and interests. For this reason, Islam is prepared to subordinate individuals to the collective interest of society and has rooted out numerous groups that were a source of corruption and harm to human society. Since the Jews of Bani Qurayza were a troublesome group, causing corruption in Muslim society and damaging Islam and the Islamic state, the Most Noble Messenger (a) eliminated them.")

In revolutionary Iran, more than 7900 political prisoners were executed between 1981 and 1985. In addition, the prison system was "drastically expanded" and prison conditions made "drastically worse" under the Islamic Republic. Press freedom was also tightened, with the international group the Reporters Without Borders declaring Iran one of the world's most repressive countries for journalists" for the first 40 years after the revolution (1980–2020).

In the world of Shi'i Islam, inside and outside of Iran, "the velayat-e faqih thesis was rejected by almost the entire dozen grand ayatollahs living" in the first years of the revolution.

In 1988 and 89, shortly before and after Khomeini's death, significant changes were made to the constitution and the concept of Wilāyat al-Faqīh, increasing the power of the Supreme Leader but reducing the scholarly qualifications needed for any new one.

In January–February 1988 Khomeini publicly propounded the theory of velayat-e motlaqaye faqih ("the absolute authority of the jurist"), whereby obedience to the ruling jurist is to "be as incumbent on the believer as the performance of prayer", and the guardian jurist's powers "extend even to the temporary suspension of such essential rites of Islam as the hajj", (Note: this "elevated the state's preservation to a primary central injunction (al-ahkam al-awwaliyya) and downgraded rituals (e.g., the obligatory prayers and fasting) to secondary injunctions (al-ahkam al-thanawiyya)", a major theological innovation) (despite the fact that his 1970 book insists that "in Islam the legislative power and competence to establish laws belongs exclusively to God Almighty"). The new theory was instigated by the need "to break the stalemate" within the Islamic Government on "controversial items of social and economic legislation".

In March 1989 Khomeini declared that all his successors as ruler should only be clerics knowledgeable about "the problems of the day" — the contemporary world and economic, social and political matters — not "religious" clerics, despite the fact that he had spent decades preaching that only application of sharia law would solve the problems of this world.

In the same month, Khomeini's officially designated successor, Hussein-Ali Montazeri, was ousted, after he called for "an open assessment of failures" of the Revolution and an end to efforts to export it. The Iranian constitution called for the Leader/Wali Al Faqih to be a marja', and Montazeri was the only marjaʿ al-taqlid beside Khomeini who had been part of Khomeini's movement, and the only senior cleric (formerly) trusted by Khomeini's network. Consequently, after Khomeini died, the Assembly of Experts amended the constitution to remove scholarly seniority from the qualifications of the leader, accommodating the appointment of a "mid-ranking" but loyal cleric (Ali Khamenei), to be the new Faqih/Leader. Lacking religious credentials, Khamenei has used "other means, such as patronage, media propaganda, and the security apparatus" to establish his power.

In the 21st century, many have noted a severe loss of prestige in Iran for the fuqaha (Islamic jurists) and for the concept of Wilayat al-faqih. "In the early 1980s, clerics were generally treated with elaborate courtesy." 20 years later, "clerics are sometimes insulted by school children and taxi drivers and they quite often put on normal clothes when venturing outside Qom." Chants of ‘Death to the dictator’ (Marg Bar Diktator, dictator a reference to the Supreme Leader), and “Death to velayat-e faqih”, have been heard during protests in Iran, which have become serious enough to see as many as 1,500 protesters killed by security forces (in one series of protests in late 2019 and early 2020). In Iraq, another Shia-majority country that is smaller and less stable than Iran and shares a border with it, sentiment against Iranian influence in 2019 led to demonstrations and attacks with Molotov cocktails against the Iranian Consulate in Karbala. Political forces alleged to be under the control of Iran there have sometimes been disparagingly referred to as "the arms of Wilayat al-Faqih."

The previous Supreme Leader, Ali Khamenei (who was killed during the 2026 Iran war) is thought to have taken some pain "to ensure that after his death Iran maintains an anti-American line and regime clerics continues to have "control of important state institutions". To this end, he initiated a "massive purge" of "all but the most reliable and obedient members" of the political class, and worked to eliminate the government's generous consumer subsidies that while very popular drain the treasury. According to Ray Takeyh of the Council on Foreign Relations, the choice of the next Supreme Leader was likely not going to be deliberated by the body designed to do that—the Assembly of Experts—but be made in a

behind-the-scenes selection process include the leadership of the Islamic Revolutionary Guards Corps, who wield both military and economic clout, and a number of conservative clerics, such as the current head of the assembly, Ahmad Khatami.

Khamenei's son, Mojtaba Khamenei, was elected Supreme Leader in 2026 after his father's death. There had been rumours that he was a possible successor before his father was killed, though after his death it was reported that his father was wary of him as a successor.

== Velayat-e Faqih in the Iranian constitution ==
According to the constitution of Iran, Islamic republic is defined as a state ruled by Islamic jurists (Fuqaha). Article Five reads

"During the Occultation of the Walial-'Asr [Lord of the Age, i.e. the Hidden Imam] (may God hasten his reappearance), the wilayah and leadership of the Ummah [nation] devolve upon the just [ʿadil] and pious [muttaqi] faqih, who is fully aware of the circumstances of his age; courageous, resourceful, and possessed of administrative ability, will assume the responsibilities of this office in accordance with Article 107.

(Other articles—107 to 112—specify the procedure for selecting the leader and list his constitutional functions.)

Articles 57 and 110 delineate the power of the ruling jurist. Article 57 states that there are other bodies/branches in the government but they are all under the control/supervision of the Leader.

The power of government in the Islamic Republic are vested in the legislature, the judiciary, and the executive powers, functioning under the supervision of the absolute religious leader and the leadership of the ummah.

According to article 110, the supervisory powers of the Supreme Leader as a Vali-e-faqih are:

- appointing the jurists to the guardian council;
- appointing the highest judicial authority in the country;
- supreme command over the armed forces and Islamic Revolution Guards Corps;
- signing the certificate of appointment allowing the president to take office;
- dismissal of the president if he feels it is in the national interest;
- granting amnesty on the recommendation of the supreme court.

The constitution quotes many verses of the Quran (21:92, 7:157, 21:105, 3:28, 28:5) in support of its aims and goals. In support of "the continuation of the Revolution at home and abroad. ... [and working with] other Islamic and popular movements to prepare the way for the formation of a single world community", and "to assure the continuation of the struggle for the liberation of all deprived and oppressed peoples in the world." it quotes Q.21:92:

- "This your community is a single community, and I am your Lord, so worship Me".

In support of "the righteous" assuming "the responsibility of governing and administering the country" it quotes Quranic verse Q.21:105:

- "Verily My righteous servants shall inherit the earth".

On the basis of the principles of the trusteeship and the permanent Imamate, rule is counted as a function of jurists. Ruling jurists must hold the religious office of "source of imitation" (Note: i.e. be a marja' al-taqlid, the highest level Shia cleric, though mention of the necessity of the Leader being a source of imitation/marja' is found only in the original constitution – such as in chapter 107 – and removed from the amended 1989 constitution)) and be considered qualified to deliver independent judgments on religious general principles (fatwas). Furthermore, they must be upright, pious, committed experts on Islam, informed about the issues of the times, and known as God-fearing, brave and qualified for leadership.

In chapter one of the constitution, where fundamental principles are expressed, article 2, section 6a, states that "continuous ijtihad of the fuqaha [jurists] possessing necessary qualifications, exercised on the basis of the Qur'an and the Sunnah" is a principle in Islamic government.

== Varieties of viewpoints ==
There is a wide spectrum of viewpoints among Ja'fari (the Twelver Shia school of law) scholars about how much power wilāyat al-faqīh should have. At the minimal end, scholars

- restrict the scope of the doctrine to non-litigious matters (al-omour al-hesbiah), people or things in Islamic society that lack a guardian over their interests (الامور الحسبیه), including unattended children, religious endowments (waqf), and property for which no specific person is responsible, as well as judicial matters, such as mediating disputes;

At the other extreme of the jurisprudence spectrum, is

- the "absolute authority of the jurist" (velayat-e motlaqaye faqih), over all public matters, where the mandate of the ruling jurisprudent/jurist/faqih is "among the primary ordinances of Islam". Here the ruling faqih has control over all public matters including governance of states; has such power over religious affairs that he can (temporarily) suspend religious obligations, such as the salat prayer or hajj; and is owed such deference that the obligation of Muslims to obey him is as important as the obligation to perform those religious obligations he has the power to suspend.

As of 2011, (at least according to authors Alireza Nader, David E. Thaler and S. R. Bohandy), those in Iran who believe in velayat-e faqih tend to fall into one of three categories listed below (the first and last roughly matching the two categories above, plus a middle view between the other two):

1. those who believe faqih should not be involved in politics ("the "quietist" or "traditional concept") and question the need for a Supreme Leader — a view that while accepted in much of the Shi'i world, is outside the "red lines" of the Islamic Republic;
2. those (such as the late Ayatollah Hussein-Ali Montazeri) who believe that the leader exercising velayat-e-faqih should be a "religious-ideological guardian", not chief executive, and subject to democratic constraints such as direct elections, term limits, etc.; and
3. those (such as conservatives like Mohammad-Taqi Mesbah-Yazdi and vigilantes who attack reformers), who believe in "absolute" velayat-e faqih, and think those who do not are "betraying Khomeini and the Islamic Revolution".

== Limited role for Guardianship ==
Traditionally Shi'i jurists have tended to this interpretation, and for most Muslims wilayat al-faqih "meant no more than legal guardianship of senior clerics over those deemed incapable of looking after their own interests — minors, widows, and the insane" (known as ‘mawla alayh’, one who is need of a guardian). Political power was to be left to Shi'i monarchs called "Sultans", who should defend the territory against the non-Shi'a. For example, according to Iranian historian Ervand Abrahamian, in centuries of debate among Shi'i scholars, none have "ever explicitly contended that monarchies per se were illegitimate or that the senior clergy had the authority to control the state." Other main responsibilities (i.e. guardianship) the 'ulama's were:

- to study the law based on the Qur'an, Sunnah and the teachings of the Twelve Imams.
- to use reason
- to update these laws;
- issue pronouncements on new problems;
- adjudicate in legal disputes; and
- distribute the khums contributions to worthy widows, orphans, seminary students, and indigent male descendants of Muhammad.

Ahmed Vaezi (a supporter of the rule of the Islamic jurist) lists the "traditional roles and functions that qualified jurists undertake as deputies of the Imam", and that "in the history of Imami Shi’ism, marja’aiyya (authoritative reference) has largely been restricted to":

1. providing fatwas ("legal and juridical decrees") as a “Marja’a taqleed”, for those who "lack sufficient knowledge of Islamic law and the legal system (Shari’ah)" (which Vaezi insists is not part of guardianship/Wilayat al-Faqih);
2. mediating disputes and judging in legal cases (which Vaezi insists Imami [Twelver Shi'i] Muslims believe is a "function of wilayat al-qada or al-hukuma);
3. Hisbiya Affairs (Al-Umur al-Hisbiya), i.e. providing a guardian for those who need one (for example, when the father of a minor or an insane person dies. Also religious endowments, inheritance and funerals). Imami jurists disagree (according to Vaezi) over whether this role is "appointed by the Shari’ah" or just a good idea because jurists are "naturally the best suited for the role".

This view "dominated Shi’a discourse on issues of religion and governance for centuries before the Islamic Revolution", and still dominates it both in Najaf and Karbala – "Shi’a centers of thought" outside of the Islamic Republic of Iran—and even within the IRI is still influential in the holy city of Qom.

Supporters of keeping wilayat out of politics and governance argue universal wilayat puts sane adults in the same category as those who are impotent in their affairs, and need a guardian to protect their interests.

This is not to say that sane, adult Shi'i do not seek and follow religious guidance from faqih. A long-standing doctrine in Shi'i Islam is that (Shi'i) Muslims should have a faqih "source to follow" or "religious reference", known as a Marjaʿ al-taqlid. Marjaʿ receive tithes from their followers and issue fatwa to them, but unlike Wali al-Faqih, it is the individual Muslim who chooses the marjaʿ, and the marja' do not have the power of the state or of militias to enforce their commands.

A minority view was that senior faqih had the right to enter political disputes "but only temporarily and when the monarch endangered the whole community". (An example being the December 1891 fatwa by Mirza Shirazi declaring tobacco forbidden, a successful effort to undermine the 1890 tobacco concession granted to the United Kingdom by Nasir al-Din Shah of Persia, giving British control over growth, sale and export of tobacco.)

=== Scriptural basis ===
The basis of wilayah/guardianship over mentally sound people (not just minors and mentally disabled) by God, Muhammad, and the Imams, which appears in principles of faith and kalam can be interpreted from verse 5:55 in the Quran.

According to Ahmed Vaezi, "Imami [Twelver Shi'i] theologians refer to the Qur’an (especially Chapter 5, Verse 55) and prophetic traditions to support the exclusive authority (i.e. exclusive Wilayat) of the Imams".

إِنَّمَا وَلِيُّكُمُ ٱللَّهُ وَرَسُولُهُۥ وَٱلَّذِينَ ءَامَنُوا۟ ٱلَّذِينَ يُقِيمُونَ ٱلصَّلَوٰةَ وَيُؤْتُونَ ٱلزَّكَوٰةَ وَهُمْ رَٰكِعُونَ
Your ally is none but Allah and [therefore] His Messenger and those who have believed – those who establish prayer and give zakah, and they bow [in worship]. (Q.5:55)

In Q.5:55, "those who believe”, may sound like it refers to Muslim believers in general, but (according to Ahmed Vaezi) Shi’a commentators have interpreted "those who believe” to mean the Shi'i Imams. (Sunni Muslims do not believe "those who believe" refers to the Imams.)

== Role of ruler for Guardian ==
=== Khomeini ===
==== Evolution of views ====
In an early work, Kashf al-Asrar, (Secrets Revealed, published in the 1940s), Khomeini had made ambiguous statements, arguing that “the state must be administered with the divine law, which defines the interests of the country and the people, and this cannot be achieved without clerical supervision (nezarat-e rouhani)”, but had not called for Jurists to rule or for them to replace monarchs – "we do not say that government must be in the hands of the faqih". He had also asserted that the practical "power of the mujtaheds" (i.e. faqih who have sufficient learning to conduct independent reasoning, known as Ijtihad),

excludes the government and includes only simple matters such as legal rulings, religious judgments, and intervention to protect the property of minors and the weak. Even when rulers are oppressive and against the people, they [the mujtaheds] will not try to destroy the rulers.

Khomeini preached that God had created sharia to guide the Islamic community (ummah), the state to implement sharia, and faqih to understand and implement sharia.

In dispensing with the traditional limited idea of wilayat al-faqih in his later work Islamic Government, Khomeini explains that there is little difference between guardianship over the nation and guardianship over a young person:

"Wilayat al-faqih is among the rational, extrinsic (ʿaqla' tibari) matters and has no reality apart from appointment (jaCI), like the appointment of a guardian for a young person. Guardianship over the nation and guardianship over a young person are no different from each other in regard to duty and position. It is like the Imam appointing someone to be the guardian of a young person, or appointing someone to govern, or appointing him to some post. In such instances, it is not reasonable [to suggest] that the Prophet and the Imam would differ from the faqih.

Shortly before he died, Khomeini gave perhaps his strongest statement about the power of the wilayat al-faqih in a letter to Ayatollah Ali Khamenei (later the second Supreme Leader of Iran:

The government or the absolute guardianship (al-wilayat al-mutlaqa) that is delegated to the noblest messenger of Allah is the most important divine law and has priority over all other ordinances of the [divine] law. If the powers of the government were restricted to the framework of ordinances of the law then the delegation of the authority to the Prophet would be a senseless phenomenon. I have to say that government is a branch of the Prophet's absolute Wilayat and one of the primary (first order) rules of Islam that has priority over all ordinances of the law even praying, fasting and Hajj…The Islamic State could prevent implementation of everything – devotional and non- devotional – that so long as it seems against Islam's interests.

=== Scriptural basis for guardian being ruler ===
==== Khomeini's arguments ====
While there are no sacred texts of Shia (or Sunni) Islam that include a straightforward statement that the Muslim community should or must be ruled over by Islamic jurists, Khomeini maintained there were "numerous traditions [hadith] that indicate the scholars of Islam are to exercise rule during the Occultation". The first one he offered as proof was a saying addressed to a corrupt, but well-connected judge in early Islam, attributed to the first Imam, 'Ali –

- "The seat you are occupying is filled by someone who is a prophet, the legatee of a prophet, or else a sinful wretch"

This is given as evidence on the grounds that

A) when the hadith says a judge is addressed, that must mean he is a trained Islamic jurist since they are "by definition learned in matters pertaining to the function of judge",
B) Since trained jurists are neither sinful wretches nor prophets, by process of elimination "we deduce from the tradition" not that Ali is shaming the judge for being a sinful wretch when he should be emulating the virtue and wisdom of the prophet, but that Ali is declaring "that the fuqaha (jurists) are the legatees," which means that since the prophet was given the power to rule over the Muslim community and all it conquered, the jurists' legacy includes that same power.

There are several other hadith and Quranic verses cited by Khomeini which he interprets to mean that those "in authority" are jurists, those who transmit his statements are jurists, and that obedience to successors and transmitters of teachings and protectors of Islam should be social and political:

- "Obey those among you who have authority" (Q.4:59);
- "those who transmit my statements and my traditions and teach them to the people" are the successors of Imam Ali's (Ali is said to have narrated);
- Ali also ordered "all believers to obey his successors", this meant his successors were jurists and Muslim should obey not just their religious teachings but their orders as rulers;
- "Believers who are fuqaha [plural of faqih] are the fortresses of Islam, like the encircling walls that protect a city", according to a narration of the Seventh Imam (Vaezi also cites this);
- The twelfth Imam had preached that future generations should obey those who knew his teachings since those people were his representatives among the people in the same way as he was God's representative among believers.

==== The Sound Transmission of Qadah ====
Other supporters have offered more hadith. Ahmed Vaezi cites a narration by Imam Ja'far al-Sadiq, according to whom Muhammad said:

- "The superiority of the learned man over the mere worshipper is like that of the full moon over the stars. Truly the religious scholars (ulema) are the heirs of the Prophet (pbuh); the prophets bequeathed not gold (dinar) and silver (dirham) instead they bequeathed knowledge, and whoever acquires it has indeed acquired a generous portion of their legacy (Note: Hadith found in: at-Tirmidhi. "Jami' at-Tirmidhi Chapter 41 on Knowledge, Hadith 38, #2682". sunnah.com. and; "Sunan Ibn Majah. Book of the Sunnah. v.1, book 1, 223". sunnah.com.; both hadith are rated da'if or weak.)

According to Vaezi, the meaning of this is not just that the knowledge the ulema have about Islam is more valuable than precious metals, but that being "the heirs of the Prophet",
العلماء ورثة الأنبياء,
they have inherited not just his knowledge but "all the attributes and responsibilities that Allah designated for him", including his authority "as the guardian and leader of the ummah" (Islamic community), which includes the power to rule. (Note: (Interestingly, Khomeini himself seems to have disagreed with Vaezi's interpretation, thinking the hadith said ulema should disdain the world of mulk – i.e. the world of sovereignty or kingdom).: "After the prophets, the function of instruction and rearing lies with the ulama, who are the real heirs of the prophets. The prophets (A) by virtue of this spiritual station, were not owners of wealth or concerned with the world of mulk [i.e. Sovereignty, Kingdom] and its corporeal affairs.")

==== The Maqbulah of ‘Umar ibn Hanzalah ====
Mohammad-Taqi Mesbah-Yazdi (along with Ahmed Vaezi and Baqir Sharif al-Qurashi) cites a hadith known as "the maqbulah of ‘Umar ibn Hanzalah", where this Umar asks the 6th Imam (Ja'far al-Sadiq) whether it is permissible when two Shi‘ah have a dispute over a debt or a legacy to go to a judge or ruler for mediation/arbitration. The Imam replies that the mediator they use should be a Muslim who knows the hadith and rulings of the Shi'i Imams or Infallibles ("a person among you who narrates from us, is versed in the lawful and the unlawful"), i.e. who knows Shi'i fiqh; and that a "ruler or judge" who doesn't have this knowledge is of taghut ("illegitimate ruling power"). Furthermore, to reject use or ruling of experts in Shi'i fiqh is equivalent to shirk, i.e. polytheism (a grave sin).

- “If there is a person among you who narrates from us, is versed in the lawful and the unlawful, and is well acquainted with our laws and ordinances, accept him as judge [qaḍi] and arbiter, for I have appointed him as a ruler [hakim] over you. So, if he rules according to our law and you reject his ruling, you will belittle Allah’s law and oppose us, and to oppose us means to oppose Allah, and opposing Him is tantamount to associating partners with Him.”

Ahmed Vaezi interprets this to mean that the order/hukm of the guardian/wali jurist/faqih "is binding upon all Muslims"—including other faqih and including Muslims outside of the political jurisdiction of the wali (i.e. outside Iran). This is because the wali is a "the just and capable jurist ... appointed as hakim", to administer justice (wilayat al-qada), and so must be obeyed.

Al Quarshi interpreted what Ja'far al-Sadiq is reported to have said to mean that "those "who relates our traditions and narrations to you" were Shi'i jurists, and those jurists now had "a general wilayat" (general guardianship) and "the authority as the ruler and point of reference for all Muslims in their social aspects". "The [singular] religious jurisprudent" should not only collect and distribute funds to the poor and needy, lead and fund "the colleges of religious sciences", but also "takes care" of and be "concerned for everything regarding the world of Islam", rising to defend Muslim lands from the attacks of infidels throughout the Muslim world.

To those who claim that the hadith is only an order to Shi‘ah not to use the courts of the usurping ‘Abbasid government when they have legal disputes, Misbah Yazdi replies that the hadith says "... I have appointed him as a ruler over you..." translating hakim as ruler, not judge. (But in another work – Islamic Political Theory (Legislation): Volume 2 – Mesbah-Yazdi translates hakim as judge.) (Note: In his Islamic Political Theory, Mesbah-Yazdi quotes a different translation of the relevant part of the Maqbulah of ‘Umar ibn Hanzalah’...فَإِنّي قَدْ جَعَلْتُهُ عَلَيْكُمْ حَاكِمًا، فَإِذَا حَكَمَ بِحُكْمِنَا فَلَمْ يَقْبَلْهُ مِنْهُ فَإِنَّمَا إسْتَخَفَّ بِحُكْمِ اللهِ وَ عَلَيْنَا رَدَّهُ وَالرَّادُّ عَلَيْنَا الرَّادُّ عَلىٰ اللهِ وَ هُوَ عَلىٰ حَدِّ الشِّرْكِ بِاللهِ... where Imam Jafar talks not about a ruler but a judge: “…For I appoint him as judge over you. Anyone who rejects his judgment is as if he belittles the judgment of Allah and rejects us, and anyone who rejects us is as if he rejects Allah, and rejection of Him is tantamount to associating partners with Him.”; not: "I have appointed him as a ruler [hakim] over you. So, if he rules according to our law and you reject his ruling, you will belittle Allah’s law and oppose us, and to oppose us means to oppose Allah, and opposing Him is tantamount to associating partners with Him.”) In any case Misbah Yazdi concludes: "it is crystal clear that obedience to the decree of the infallible Imam (‘a) is obligatory and mandatory. As such, to obey the decree of the [ruler] faqih is obligatory and mandatory, too"; and in another chapter of his book he also claims, "the faqih enjoys all the prerogatives which the infallible Imam (‘a) as the holder of authority of the Islamic society has."

=== Arguments of Taqi Yazdi and Ahmed Vaezi ===
Clerics connected to the Islamic Republic — Ayatollah, Muhammad Taqi Misbah Yazdi (1935–2021) and Iranian Shi'i cleric and academic Ahmed Vaezi (b. 1963) — have also defended Khomeini's theory of government by the Faqih and the principle of the universal and absolute guardianship of the Guardian Faqih. (Misbah Yazdi in particular was “perhaps the most prominent and vocal proponent of absolute velayat-e faghih [faqih]"—asserted that “neither the laws nor the officials of the state have any legitimacy unless and until they meet with the vali-e faghih’s [Guardian Faqih/Supreme Leader’s] approval”, and that the vali-e faghi ruler possesses "all the prerogatives" of the infallible Imam (‘a) "as the holder of authority of the Islamic society".)

At least as of the early 21st century, their defenses of Khomeini's concept tended to be replies to criticisms. Misbah Yazdi (in his work, A Cursory Glance at the Theory of Wilayat al-Faqih), emphasizes the many dangers to defend against, warning the faithful of: "intellectual and ideological threats", “satanic hands" and "propaganda" spreading "incorrect" and "groundless" thoughts", the "untenable claims and inconsistent features", the "calumnies and lies", the "sinister and nefarious propaganda", of "the enemies" of Wilayat al-Faqih. In addition, there is the danger of the influence of "the prevailing intellectual atmosphere", the danger of those "fascinated by or deluded by the Western culture", and the concepts of "freedom and democracy", which are the "goddesses" and "sacred idols ... of the 20th and 21st centuries", etc.

==== Defenses ====
Some of the criticism of Wilayat al-Faqih that they reply to, include:

- that there is no straightforward statement in scripture that faqih clerics should rule over the people.

Those concerned over whether Islam supports the concept of wilayat al-faqih, should note that (according to Mesbah Yazdi), the "overwhelmingly dominant opinion" of Shi'ah jurisprudents, (based on "the available views and opinions") is that "a duly competent jurist" (who is "appointed according to the general descriptions ... that the Imam has set") should rule over the people during the occultation of the Imam. Unfortunately, preventing a consensus among jurisprudents on this point are "one or two" contemporary Shi'ah jurists, who insist that for a government to be legitimate, it must be "decided by the people". Those concerned should also look to several hadith (listed above in "scriptural basis"), which when properly understood, make "it is crystal clear that obedience to the ... decree of the [ruler] faqih" is just as obligatory and mandatory," as obedience to the infallible Imam (‘a).

In addition there are two "Intellectual proofs" (using reason rather than scripture) substantiating wilayat al-faqih:

Proof #1

1. Everyone needs a government for order and welfare;
2. the best government is that run by the infallible imam;
3. since we can't have that at present, we need one resembling it as much as possible;
4. rule by the Islamic jurist provides that, since the jurist provides "absolute immunity from any kind of corruption, error, sin, selfishness", and "comprehensive and perfect insight and competence in social conditions".

Proof #2

1. God possesses the exclusive "right to exercise authority over the properties, honor and lives of the people",
2. a right he bestowed first on "the Holy Prophet (S)" Muhammad and then on the infallibles;
3. these are now gone, but God couldn't have "abandoned His purpose", namely, "man’s attainment of bliss and perfection", the reason sharia was created;
4. so he must have "given permission to the most appropriate person to implement them";
5. and that person is a "competent jurist" who possesses fear of God and "expertise in governing society and ensuring its welfare".

Ahmed Vaezi gives a similar argument, maintaining that a ruling wali (guardian) is a natural progression from God (who several verses in the Quran—Q.3:68, Q.2:257, Q.4:45—describe as a wali over the believers), to Muhammad (who is also described as such in Q.5:55, Q.33:6), to the Imams (who are described as wali in numerous Shi'i hadith). So it is natural that the next religious figure after them also have the "universal" powers that Muhammad and the Imams had. This also explains why giving a faqih general powers over the public does not put sane adults in the same category as minors and those without the power of reason. The powers of God, Muhammad and the Imams were total, despite the fact their subjects possessed maturity (bulugh) and ability to reason (ʿaql).

- that the concept of wilayat al-faqih ought to be something Shi'a Muslims are able to understand/accept/believe based on their own religious study [i.e. tahqiq] (as they do with the basic principles of belief – "proving the existence of God or the prophethood of the Prophet"), and not something accepted without question from a religious scholar.

Despite providing hadith and intellectual proofs for absolute wilayat al-faqih, Mesbah Yazdi also argues that the idea of rule of the jurist is a principle of religion that believers must accept on faith [taqlid] – because of its "special character", it is, "in a sense", an issue "among the subjects pertaining to prophethood and Imamate", (and so outside the bounds of understanding from individual study).

- that in Shi'a Islam, all believers already have a religious scholar to provide them with guidance—the "source of emulation (maraji‘ at-taqlid)" that each Shi'i chooses (as of 2022 there were several dozen to choose from, mostly located in Iraq and Iran), and they were not punished by the state if they failed to obey their source. Why do they then need a wilayat? And what happens when he disagrees with a marja'? (there have been differences of opinion between the Supreme leader and other Marjas over issues such as the permissibility in Islam of chess playing, listening to music, or whether to continue fighting a war with Iraq, presenting challenges for the velayat-e faqih system in Iran.) Will the wilayat supersede the marja'?

Mesbah Yazdi and Ahmed Vaezi claim that the maraji‘ at-taqlid and wilayat al-faqih have two different roles. One gives fatwa; the other decrees (hukm). One ('maraji‘) gives opinions on "general issues and Islamic precepts", answering religious questions on practical matters in Islam by making deductions from their religious knowledge; and the other (wilayat) enacts and implements laws and regulations, decrees intended to "effectively organize and resolve difficulties within Muslim society".

Vaezi also explains that while a fatwa may sometimes conflict with a hukm, the Muslim must obey the Wali's hukm over their marja' fatwa because the order/hukm "is binding upon all Muslims"—including other faqih and including Muslims outside of the political jurisdiction of the Wali (i.e. outside Iran), (as explained in The Maqbulah of ‘Umar ibn Hanzalah, the hadith above).

- that giving the guardian jurist "absolute" status so that he "may issue orders that disregard the commands of the Shari’ah" (Ahmed Vaezi), not only contradicts "Khomeini's previous promises but also the norms of the sacred law" (Freedom Movement of Iran of Mehdi Bazargan).

About nine years after its founding, a "stalemate" developed within the Islamic Government between Islamic radicals trying to push through "controversial items of social and economic legislation" (labor laws, income tax), and conservatives "Guardian" mullahs vetoing their bills. (Note: "... from 1981 to 1987 the Guardian Council vetoed some 100 reform bills as violations against the sanctity of private property. These bills included land reform, labor legislation, progressive income tax, control over urban real-estate transactions, nationalization of foreign trade, and confiscation of the property of emigres who had not been found guilt of having obtained their wealth through unlawful means.") Both groups were supporters of Khomeini and he attempted to find a compromise with "milder" legislation. In the process of trying to solve this impasse he made a statement in January 1988 elevating "the preservation of the Islamic state to a primary central injunction (al-ahkam al-awwaliyya) and downgraded rituals (e.g., the obligatory salat prayers and fasting during Ramadan) to secondary injunctions (al-ahkam al-thanawiyya)". (This of course also elevated the jurist ruler of the Islamic state, and concept is called velayat-e motlaqaye faqih – "the absolute authority of the jurist".)

"I should state that the government, which is part of the absolute deputyship of the Prophet, is one of the primary injunctions of Islam and has priority over all secondary injunctions, even prayers fasting and hajj".

Extending the power of the guardian jurist "to the temporary suspension of such essential rites of Islam as the hajj", was seemingly in contradiction for the rationale Khomeini gave for the need for an Islamic government in his 1970 manifesto:

... in Islam the legislative power and competence to establish laws belongs exclusively to God Almighty. The Sacred Legislator of Islam is the sole legislative power. No one has the right to legislate and no law may be executed except the law of the Divine Legislator. ... The law of Islam, divine command, has absolute authority over all individuals and the Islamic government. Everyone, including the Most Noble Messenger (s) and his successors, is subject to law and will remain so for all eternity—the law that has been revealed by God, Almighty and Exalted,...

Concerning this controversy, Mesbah Yazdi maintains that the ruling jurist's priority over things like prayer and hajj involves only things like delaying the offering of salat prayer when "the enemies’ attack is due", not serious changes in Islam.

Similarly, Ahmed Vaezi states that commands to reverse sacred law are only temporary commands applicable when some "significant damage, distress and constriction or disorder" occurs; ‘first order’ laws (al-ahkam al-awaly) remain intact. He explains that under the "revolutionary view" of Ayatollah Khomeini, "Shari’ah … is not the ultimate goal". Islamic laws are only a means to an end, "the protection of Islam and the extension of Justice". For Khomeini "the Islamic State is not merely one part of Islam amongst others, but it is Islam itself".

- That unless the ruler is one of the most learned faqih (a Grand Ayatollah), the "intellectual foundations" of the concept of wilayat al-faqih are "undermined" (according to Ervand Abrahamian), (Note: "This amendment ... unwittingly undermined the intellectual foundations of Khomeini's velayat-e faqih. After all, in his [manifesto] Velayat-e Faqih, Khomeini had argued that only the most senior religious jurists – not just any cleric -- had the scholastic expertise and the educational training to fully comprehend the intricacies of Islamic jurisprudence.") and the "logic" of the Islamic revolution comes to an "end" (according to Olivier Roy). (Note: "The death of Imam Khomeini, on June 3, 1989, brought an end to the logic of the Islamic revolution, according to which the highest authority of the clerical institution coincided with that of the state.")

As mentioned above in the History section, in March 1989 Khomeini made a "major pronouncement" declaring that clerics could be categorized "into two distinct groups" — those clerics knowledgeable about "religious scholarship", and those knowledgeable about "the problems of the day", i.e. the contemporary world and economic, social and political matters. It was the second group that should rule, not the "religious" clerics, despite the fact that Khomeini had spent decades denouncing the secularist idea that the affairs of this world "were separate from the understanding of the sacred law".

Also in that month, Hussein-Ali Montazeri, was ousted as Khomeini's officially designated successor, after he called for "an open assessment of failures" of the Revolution and an end to the export of revolution. Montazeri was the only marjaʿ al-taqlid beside Khomeini who had been part of Khomeini's movement, and the only senior cleric trusted by Khomeini's network. Since the constitution called for the Supreme Leader/Wali al-Faqih to be a marja' — and although it stated (Note: in the leadership clauses of the constitution, especially those stipulating that ultimate authority resides in the senior religious jurists, ten years after the constitution was approved the Assembly of Experts "drastically" revamped these clauses) that its clauses were to endure until the Mahdi reappeared on earth to rule — after Khomeini died the Assembly of Experts amended the constitution to remove scholarly seniority from the qualifications of the leader, accommodating the appointment of a "mid-ranking" but loyal cleric (Ali Khamenei), to be Leader. (Note: being deceased, Khomeini himself did not oversee this constitutional change, but is thought to have "anticipated the succession problem" with his declaration about the two kinds of clerics.)

Mesbah Yazdi doesn't talk about this event or the controversy. He agrees that "the basic and fundamental raison d’être of wilayat al-faqih is the implementation of Islamic laws and ordinances", and that the guardian jurist "must first and foremost be knowledgeable, familiar with the laws of Islam and is able to identify them very well". But goes on to say that if the leading jurist lacks fear of God and "efficiency in managing the society", he is disqualified from that position.

- that the people deserve to choose who rules over them;

Mesbah Yazdi argues that it is a common misconception to hold that in order to have legitimacy, government must represent the people. Since "the entire universe and whatever is in it belongs to God", humans have no more right to choose/elect someone to rule themselves, than they would have to take someone else's property ("house, car, shoes, clothes, etc.") and use it without that person's permission. This does not mean the people do not have a vital role to play in the system of wilayat al-faqih, for by their acceptance of Islamic government, the people secure the actual establishment and stability of divine government.

- that Absolute Guardianship of the jurist may lead to, has led to, or will lead to despotic government or dictatorship;

Mesbah-Yazdi raises this doubt, but assures readers that it would be impossible because while a dictator rules according to "his personal whims and caprice", the Guardian Jurist "rules according to the will and choice of God, the Exalted, following the divine laws". What would happen if the Wali drifted "away" from Islam and its laws? He would "spontaneously" lose credibility, and "not be obeyed".

Ahmed Vaezi also reassures readers that absolute guardianship is "totally different" from "totalitarian and dictatorial government" and absolutism found in Western states, because the Wali possesses the qualities of "justice, piety and the necessary socio-political perspicacity" and will be "dismissed" if he fails to demonstrate them. (Note: In the Islamic Republic of Iran "there are no formal mechanisms—constitutionally-sanctioned or otherwise—through which the Assembly can challenge the Supreme Leader ...")

- that throughout history, integrating religion and politics has not ended well; Because of the corruption of power, if you "want your religion to remain safe and the Qur’an and Islam be respected" you must keep "religion away from the political scene.
  - instead, the management of social (and economic, political) affairs should be based on the domain of fact, not religion, planning based on what people see and experience.

The idea that rule by religious dignitaries is a mistake because government should be kept separate from religion (according to Mesbah Yazdi) comes from medieval Europe where "monarchs had to submit to and obey" the Catholic Pope. Eventually, "all the misfortunes, deprivations, and backwardness" of Europe came to be blamed on religion, and now, because of modern technology, these ideas have spread to "Muslim countries and Muslim thinkers" despite their being alien to Islam. The idea that "whatever we feel and see [is] real and we must think about it and set a plan for it", is also based on an erroneous European idea—the philosophy of Positivism

- that if we are to have a government by Jurist, he should be chosen by popular vote. After all, didn't Muhammad asked the people in Ghadir Khumm to pay allegiance to ‘Ali (‘a) (the first Imam and fourth Caliph)? why would "the Prophet (S) ask the people to give their allegiance to the Imam (‘a) ... if the legitimacy of the government of ‘Ali (‘a) had indeed nothing to do with the vote of the people"?

Mesbah Yasdi argues that just as you would use professors of mathematics to select the best professor of mathematics, so you use experts on the subject of fiqh—and not public opinion—to pick the best expert on fiqh.

Mesbah Yazdi wrote that bay'ah (oath of allegiance) is only "a means of expressing readiness to assist and cooperate" with the leader, and "has nothing to do with giving legitimacy and granting the right" to rule over them.

- Currently there is a "problem of circularity" in selecting a Guardian Jurist/Supreme Leader in the Islamic Republic, preventing the people of Iran from having input in choosing Iran's most powerful official—i.e. The Assembly of Experts picks the Guardian Jurist/Supreme Leader who then can appoint half of the members of the Guardian Council (and may dismiss them at will), the Guardians approve any candidate wishing to run for the office of the Assembly of Experts. This creates a self-perpetuating cycle whereby if the people of Iran oppose the Leader, or oppose the people who select him, they can do little about it.

Misbah Yazdi defends the allegedly circular selection process of the Guardian Council, Assembly of Experts, Supreme Leader by noting it is "stipulated in the Constitution" or Iran, that the approval of candidates for the Council of Guardians is the "prerogative" of wali al-faqih's (who as previously demonstrated is God's ruler). He further points out that in all modern so-called democracies there is always a first election to vote members of some body of representatives (such as a constitutional assembly to write a constitution) and that body comes "into existence as a result of an election based on a certain set of rules and regulations" which were not "enacted and approved by any popularly-elected cabinet and parliament" (such as who gets to vote—how old they must be, whether only men can vote, etc.; who gets to be elected to the body, voting system—first past the post, ranked choice, proportional representation, etc..) because it's the first election! But this "is nothing but the circular relationship to which we have referred at the beginning". So we see that (according to Mesbah Yazdi) just because there is "circularity" in the wilayat al-faqih system should not disqualify it; otherwise, we would "have to reject all the past, present and future democratic governments and systems in the world."

==== Other points of criticism ====
In addition to those that Misbah Yazdi and Ahmad Vaezi have attempted to debunk, there have been a number of criticisms made against Islamic clerics serving as guardians over sane adults, specifically governing them, and especially about its application in the Islamic Republic of Iran.

Khomeini preached that because Muslims accepted and recognized sharia law "as worthy of obedience", a government ruling according to sharia would "truly belong to the people", unlike those secular states with "sham parliaments". But despite his confidence in the support of the people for rule by Sharia via jurists, in public proclamations "during the revolution" and before the overthrow of the monarchy, Khomeini made "no mention" of velayat-e faqih. When a campaign started to install velayat-e faqih in the new Iranian constitution, critics complained that he had become the leader of the revolution promising to advise, rather than rule, the country after the Shah was overthrown, when in fact he had developed his theory of rule by jurists not by democratic elections and spread it among his followers years before the revolution started; It is a complaint that some continue to make.

The execution of the theory of rule by Islamic jurists has been criticized on utilitarian grounds (as opposed to religious grounds), by those who argue that it has simply not done what Khomeini said his theory would do. The goals of ending poverty, (Note: In the first six years after the overthrow of the Shah (from 1979 through 1985), The Iranian government's "own Planning and Budget Organization reported that ... absolute poverty rose by nearly 45%!") corruption, (Note: After the mayor of Iran's largest city Tehran was arrested for corruption in 1998, ex-President Rafsanjani said in a sermon `Graft has always existed, there are always people who are corrupt....`)) national debt, (Note: Khomeini himself did not run up debt but in the decade after his death, under his faqih guardian successor Iran not only went back into debt, but built it up to almost four times the putatively shameful debt the monarchy left behind in 1979. Spending that Iranian economists criticized as "reckless.") or compelling un-Islamic government to capitulate before the Islamic government's armies, (Note: On the start of Iran's war with Saddam Hussein's secular state of Iraq, Khomeini stated there were no conditions for a truce except that "the regime in Baghdad must fall and must be replaced by an Islamic Republic" Six years, hundreds of thousands of Iranian lives, and $100's of billions later, faced with desertions and resistance against the conscription, Khomeini signed a peace agreement stating "... we have no choice and we should give in to what God wants us to do ... I reiterate that the acceptance of this issue is more bitter than poison for me, but I drink this chalice of poison for the Almighty and for His satisfaction.") have not been met; nor have even more modest and basic goals like downsizing the government bureaucracy, (Note: "Khomeini had to preside over a state bureaucracy three times larger than that of Mohammad Reza Shah.") using only senior religious jurists or [marja]s for the post of faqih guardian/Supreme Leader. (Note: On April 24, 1989, Article 109 of the Iranian constitution, requiring that the Leader be a marja'-e taqlid, was removed. New wording in constitutional articles 5, 107, 109, 111, required him to be `a pious and just faqih, aware of the exigencies of the time, courageous, and with good managerial skills and foresight.` If there are a number of candidates, the person with the best `political and jurisprudential` vision should have the priority.`)

=== Opposition among scholars to guardian as ruler ===
According to Olivier Roy, at the time Khomeini was consolidating power in Iran,

"the velayat-e faqih thesis was rejected by almost the entire dozen grand ayatollahs living in 1981: they either openly opposed Khomeini, as did Abu al-Qasim al-Khoei [1899-1992] and Shariat Madari [1906–1986], or they maintained a discreet distance, refusing official posts, as did Gulpaygani [1899–1993], al-Qummi [1912-2007], al-Shirazi and al-Najaf al-Mar'ashi. In fact the high clergy kept its distance from the revolution. Only one grand ayatollah, Muntazari [1922-2009], a former student and the designated successor of Khomeini before dissenting and being rejected in 1989, approved the concept. Moreover, Khomeini was not the most influential ayatollah at the moment of the Islamic revolution. The one who had the most developed network of disciples and former students was the very old Ayatollah Abu al-Qasim al-Khoei (born in 1899), an Iranian Azeri whose great influence reached from Lebanon (the spiritual leader of the Hizbullah, Sheikh Fadallah) ... to Afghanistan .... Al-Khoei did not leave Najaf during the war between Iran and Iraq and always rejected the concept of velayat-e faqih ....

According to Ali Mamouri, writing in 2013, the Islamic Republic of Iran, "has never been able to establish a stable and harmonious relationship between the Shiite seminaries of Qom and Najaf". "Most" of the "spiritual references", aka marjaʿ, in Qom (at least in 2013) do not supporting the regime's position on velayat-e faqih, even though it has led to a number of them being placed under house arrest and barred "from expressing their views and ideas or continuing their teaching and religious duties". Najaf religious leaders present an even greater problem as Najaf is outside the border of Iran and so its marjaʿ cannot be incarcerated by Iran.

According to Mirjam Künkler, inside the Islamic Republic itself, clerical dissent

"is not uniform. It takes various forms and its motivations are manifold. Some reject the concept of velāyat-e faqih altogether, while others accept it but denounce the personalization which the position has experienced both under Khomeini and Khamenei; some accept Khomeini’s claim to the velāyat, while they reject Khamenei’s; yet others accept the velāyat-e faqih, but disagree with particular policies, notably with the extent to which the Leader’s office interferes with the administration of religious seminaries and the content of the curricula."

As of 2015, 2018, the leading Marja' of Najaf (Ali al-Sistani) and Najafi clerics in general, opposed Ruhollah Khomeini's concept of guardianship, or were conspicuously silent on the subject and a large segment of the clerical Shia community in general does not accept the theory of velayat-e-faqih and believes the clergy should stay away from politics. The majority of Shi'a accepted the late Grand Ayatollah Seyyed Hossein Borujerdi (1875–1961) as their Marja' al Taqlid (source of emulation), including his student, Ayatollah Ruhollah Khomeini. Throughout his life, Borujerdi, who was a quietist and therefore refrained from taking political stances, forbid his student Khomeini from engaging in non-religious matters. It was only after Borujerdi's death that Khomeini published his first political and social treatise in which he explicitly called for active participation in political matters.

Regarding Guardianship, several senior faqih have written on the exclusivity of the authority of the Imams, the limits of the authority of faqih, and the dangers to faqih and to Islam of the corruption of power.

==== Persecution of Islamic scholars ====
In his 1970 lectures and book on Islamic Government, Khomeini took time to express his outrage at clerics who had supported his enemy, the shah of Iran, and exasperation that they had not been "stripped of their turbans": "Those persons are not Muslim fuqaha [Islamic legal scholars], they are people whom SAVAK [the shah's Iranian security service] has issued a turban and told to pray"; and stated that "our youth must strip them of their turbans. I am not saying they should be killed ... But take off their turbans!".

After the revolution a Special Clerical Court was established in the Islamic Republic for prosecuting Islamic clerics and scholars, and punishing them by defrocking and disbaring, giving sentences of imprisonment, corporal punishment, execution, etc. The court system eventually evolved into an apparatus with its own security and prison systems, and many features unique from the rest of Iran's courts (direct control by the Supreme Leader rather than the judiciary system of the Islamic Republic as per the Constitution of Iran, trials that are not open to the public and do not allow the accused to choose their own defense counsel, and whose verdict cannot be appealed to the Supreme Court of Iran, as per the Constitution of Iran, etc.). It has been suggested (by scholar Mirjam Künkler) that the courts existence, size and scope can be explained by the unique problem that dissident clerics pose for the principle of velāyat-e faqih — that non-clerical opposition forces lacking religious cachet and knowledge of the intricacies Islamic law would not. "Dissident theologians who prove the extent to which the velāyat-e faqih is inconsistent with Shiʿi traditions and the extent to which it is a theological novelty whose primary function is to justify the exercise of authoritarian rule", are a danger to the Guardian ruler.

==== Al-Shaykh Al-Mufid ====
Unlike Sunnis who believe in appointment of the Islamic Caliph through Ijm'a or Shura, Imamiyya Shia say that the Imam and the legitimate Caliph of the Islamic nation must only be appointed by God; that appointment may be known through the declaration of Muhammad or the preceding Imam.

Corresponding to the godly decree of Quran in the following holy verses:

Behold, thy Lord said to the angels: "I will appoint a Caliph on earth." [2:30]

Thy Lord does create and choose as He pleases: no choice they do have. [28:68]

Divine authority to rule an Islamic State, traditional Shia believe, is vested exclusively with the Infallible Imams of Ahlulbayt, with jurists having authority in the Imam’s absence.

In the words of Al-Shaykh Al-Mufid:

سلطان الإسلام المنصوب من قبل الله تعالى، وهم أئمة الهدى من آل محمد عليهم السلام

"The Islamic Ruler is he who is appointed divinely by the Almighty Allah and they are the Imams of Guidance from the Progeny of Muhammad, peace be upon them all."[207]

Al-Khoei

Similarly, Sistani's mentor the Late Grand Ayatollah Sayyid Abul Qasim al-Musawi al-Khoei (1899-1992), (also transliterated Khu i) the leading Shia ayatollah at the time Khoemini's book on his theory of Wilayat al-Faqih was published, rejected Khomeini's argument on the grounds that

The authority of faqih-is limited to the guardianship of widows and orphans - could not be extended by human beings to the political sphere [188]

In the absence of the Hidden Imam (the 12th and last Shi'a Imam), the authority of jurisprudence was not the preserve of one or a few fuqaha [188] is deemed to be one of the most vocal modern day jurists against the innate nature of Wilayat al-Faqih.

In contrasting one-sentence mottos, Khomeini, preached that "only a good society can create good believers", while Khoei, who championed the theory of a "civil state", argued "only good men can create a good society."[189]

Al-Khoei restricted the scope of Wilayat al-Faqih to the jurist's authority in terms of wakalah (i.e. protection, delegation, or authorization often agreed to in a legal contract) alone while dismissing the notion of the jurist inheriting the intrinsic authority to rule of the Infallibles (Imams).

Al-Khoei wrote:

إن الولاية لم تثبت للفقيه في عصر الغيبة بدليل، وإنما هي مختصة بالنبي والأئمة المعصومين (عليهم السلام)، بل الثابت حسبما يستفاد من الروايات أمران نفوذ قضائه، وحجية فتواه. وليس له التصرف في أموال القصر أو غير ذلك مما هو من شؤون الولاية، إلا في الأمر الحسبي، فإن الفقيه له الولاية في ذلك لا بالمعنى المدعى

"Wilayah for the faqih in the age of ghaybah [occultation, i.e. from 939 CE until the coming of the Mahdi] is not approved by any evidence whatsoever - and it's only the prerogative of the Messenger and the Imams peace be upon them all, rather the established fact according to the narrations lies in two affairs: 1. him exercising the role of a judge and 2. his fatwa being a proof- and he holds no authority over the property of a child or others which is from the affairs of wilayah except in the hisbi sense (wakalah), i.e. the faqih holds wilayah in this sense not in the sense of being the claimant (al mudda'ee)."[190]

Furthermore, al-Khoei elaborates on the role of a well-qualified Islamic Jurist in the age of occultation of the Infallible Imam which has been traditionally endorsed by the Shia scholarship as follows:

من قبل الواقف أما الولاية على الأمور الحسبية كحفظ أموال الغائب واليتيم إذا لم يكن من يتصدى لحفظها كالولي أو نحوه، فهي ثابتة للفقيه الجامع للشرائط وكذا الموقوفات التي ليس لها متول والمرافعات، فإن فصل الخصومة فيها بيد الفقيه وأمثال ذلك، وأما الزائد على ذلك فالمشهور بين الفقهاء على عدم الثبوت، والله العال

"As for wilayah (guardianship) of omour al-hesbiah (non-litigious affairs) such as the maintenance of properties of the missing and the orphans, if they are not addressed to preservation by a wali (guardian) or so, it is proven for the faqih jame'a li-sharaet and likewise waqf properties that do not have a mutawalli (trustee) on behalf of waqif (donor of waqf) and continuance pleadings, the judgement regarding litigation is in his hand and similar authorities, but with regards to the excess of that (guardianship) the most popular (opinion) among the jurists is on absence of its evidence, Allah knows best."[191]

==== Al-Sistani ====
One of the most senior scholars in Shia Islam, reportedly the leading Marja' in Najaf and a former student of Ayatollah Abu al-Qasim al-Khoei is Ali al-Husayni al-Sistani. Perhaps because of his considerable influence, sources disagree on his stand on Wilayat al-Faqih. Al-Sistani has inserted himself in post-2003 invasion Iraqi crises several times—issuing a call for Iraqis to take up arms and push back Da'ish (Islamic State), pressuring the United States to hold elections sooner than it wanted, demanding Iraqi political leaders push ahead with anti-corruption reforms in 2015—but sees himself as a unifier, above politics and has had no "role in executive or administrative arms of the state".

The Ahl Bayt Islamic Mission, which warns of that "the West-based campaign ... to disrupt Islamic unity, ... and separate Iraq from even the bare idea of Islamic Revolution", preventing it from and following the model of "the Islamic Revolution of Iran", has "for decades ... manipulated the Shi’i public opinion ... and "spread false notions like ... the existence of a quietist and apolitical tradition of Shi’ism among the jurists"; emphasizes al-Sistani opposes secularism, and maintains that his position is close to the Iranian doctrine of Wilayat al-Faqih.

According to the official website of al-Sistani, al-Sistani argued that if a faqih wants to possess wilaya in the state's administration, he must secure the people's general approval (maqbuliyya 'amnio).

Guardianship of the Islamic Jurist

means every jurisprudent (Faqih) has guardianship (wilayah) over non-litigious affairs. Non-litigious affairs are technically called al-omour al-hesbiah. As for general affairs with which social order is linked, wilayah of a Faqih and enforcement of wilayah depend on certain conditions one of which is popularity of acceptability of Faqih among majority of faithful (momeneen).

===== Al-Sistani's argument =====
al-Sistani in his own advanced lectures of dars al-kharij (i.e. the highest level of theological education related to jurisprudence in the form of lectures, beyond the limited boundaries of textbooks) in the Shi'i seminary of Najaf summing up his opinion regarding Wilayat al-Faqih stated:

فليس الطاغوت عبارة عن السلاطين الأمراء كما قيل إذ لم يكن في زمن النبي (ص) في جزيرة العرب سلطان و امیر حتى يقال بانه القدر المتيقن منه من يحكم بالجور أو ما ينسب إليه الحكم كالأصنام مضافا إلى انه لم يكن للطاغوط قوة تنفيذية

" al-Taghut (as a term that is specifically used to denounce everything that is worshiped instead or besides Allah) is not an expression concerning kings or governors as stated by some (i.e. Khomeini 215), since kings and govermors did not exist during the times of the Apostle until it can be said to the extent of certainty that they are addressed as Taghut, in fact certainly Taghut is who is unjust in passing judgement or to whom the judgement is attributed like the idols, moreover Taghut back in time did not have the power of enforcement. " [216]

He further added:

ان مستفاد من بعض الروايات هو دخالة الإنتخاب في المسألة، فلا بد أن يكون القاضي منتخبا من المسلمين و ذلك لقوله (ع): «فاجعلوا بينكم في مقبولة عمر بن حنظلة وعلى هذا الاحتمال لا بدا أن يكون المتصدي لهذه الأمور ممثلاً للمسلمين

"It is deduced from some narrations, the involvement of election in this issue: so the Qadhi (i.e. well-qualified jurist exercising authority as a Judge) must be elected by muslims and this is in accordance to the saying of the Imam "appoint among yourselves" in the acceptable report of Omar bin Hanzalah, based on this prospect he must be addressing the affairs representing muslims (as a judge), [217]

As his concluding remark on the subject al-Sistani said:

فتحصل مما ذكرنا أن الأدلة غير وافية: الإجماع مخدوش ا الدليل العقلي يناقش فيه بما ذكر و غير ما ذكر. و لا بد للمثبت من دفع جميع الشبهات ا أني له ذلك لعل الأجل دقة الموقف قال المحقق النائني و المحقق الإصفهاني: (فيه تزلزل عظيم) و صلى الله على سيدنا محمد آله الطاهرين

"The proofs are insufficient, the scholarly consensus is depleted, the rational proof is disputative between what's been mentioned and what's not. The verifier must repel all the suspicions (surrounding the scriptural and rational speculations on topic) and how can he do that?. Perhaps due to the delicacy of the situation muhaqqiq al-Naini and muhaqqiq al- Isfahani have stated; There is extreme quake (uncertainty) about wilayat al-faqih! (fiihe tazalzalun 'aziim!) May blessings of Allah be upon our master Muhammad and his pure Progeny." [218]

==== Nawishta-e-Akhoond ====
Muhammad Kazim Khurasani (1839–1911), commonly known as Akhund Khurasani, was a Shi'i Marja'. based in Najaf who was the main clerical supporter and legitimizing force for the Persian Constitutional Revolution, Iran's democratic revolution of 1905–1911. Traditional Shia scholarship has been historically critical with regard to the clergy relinquishing the role of advisory for the State and taking over absolute charge of the State affairs firsthand instead. Khurasani made a set of prudent observations in his famous Nawishta about the inevitable hazards that will arise owing to the hypothesis proposing clergymen employ religion to legitimize their rule. Some of these predictions are as follows (Persian followed by translation):

- چون مردم ما را نایبان امام زمان می دانند انتظار دارند حکومت دینی هم همان شرایط را ایجاد کند و وقتی نتوانیم در آن سطح عدالت را برقرار کنیم نسبت به امام زمان و دین سست عقیده می شون

"Since the people consider the clergymen to be deputies of Imam al-Zaman, they will expect the religious government to create an exemplary system (closely matching the one supposed to be established by the Infallible Imam) and when they can not establish justice at that level, the Shia masses will become weak in their faith about Imam al-Zaman and religion."

- وقتی روحانیون پا به حکومت بگذارند دیگر نمی توانند عیوب خود را ببینند و توجیه می کنند و فسادها را نادیده میگیرند

"When the clergymen will come to power, they could no longer see their faults and justify and ignore corruption."

- آمال وآرزوی ما تبعیت حکومت از دین است در حالیکه اگر حکومت را در دست گیریم، به تبعیت دین از حکومت دچار خواهیم شد

"The clergy's aspiration is government's obedience to religion, while if the clergymen took over the charge of government, they are more likely to make religion subservient to the government."

- اکنون که مناصب حکومتی نداریم ، اینهمه اختلاف نظر وجود دارد. اگر به حکومت برسیم این اختلاف نظر باعث چندپارگی دین و ایجاد فرقه های جدید و آسیب به دین می شود

"At the time when clergymen do not have government positions, yet there exists so much disagreement. If they come to power, this disagreement will cause further division in religion and creation of new sects and hence cause damage to religion."

- ذات حکومت کردن دروغ گفتن است و نمی شود حکومت با اخلاق داشت. لذا در شان روحانیت نیست که دروغ بگوید و دامن دین را بیالاید

"The essence of fallible governance is to spew lies and it is technically impossible to govern morally. Therefore, it is against the moral character of clergymen to lie and thus defame religion."

==== Muhammad Hussain Naini ====
Muhammad Hussain Naini, an aide to Akhund Khurasani, argued that while the ideal government is the rule of the divinely inspired and infallible leader of the community of believers, i.e. the Imam, this ideal form of government is unavailable during the occultation. Consequently, the choices available are between "despotic" and "constitutional" government. Despotism being tyranny, it is constitutional government that diverges "least from the ideal government of the Imam", and is "therefore the best type of government during the occultation.

== Books ==
- Vilayat-e Faqih, Ruhollah Khomeini
- Vilayat-e Faqih, Ahmad Azari Qomi
- Vilayat-e Faqih, Hussein-Ali Montazeri
- Vilayat-e Faqih, Hasan Ali Nejabat Shirazi
- Vilayat-e Faqih, Javadi Amoli
- Vilayat-e Faqih, Kazem al-Haeri

== See also ==
- Blasphemy law in Iran
- Da'i al-Mutlaq
- Islamic leadership
- Islamic republic
- Jaʽfari jurisprudence
- Nematollah Salehi Najafabadi
- Execution of Imam Khomeini's Order (Setad)

== Bibliography and further reading ==
- Abrahamian, Ervand (1982). Iran between two revolutions. Princeton University Press. ISBN 0691101345.
- Abrahamian, Ervand (1993). Khomeinism: Essays on the Islamic Republic. California: University of California Press. ISBN 0520081730.
- Abrahamian, Ervand (1999). Tortured Confessions: Prisons and Public Recantations in Modern Iran. University of California Press. ISBN 0-520-21866-3.
- Amuli, Ayatollah Jawadi (July 2016). "A Glance at the Fundamentals of the Trusteeship of the Jurisconsult (Wilayat al-faqih)". rafed.net.
- Gölz, Olmo (2017). "Khomeini's Face is in the Moon: Limitations of Sacredness and the Origins of Sovereignty". In F. Heinzer; J. Leonhard; R. von den Hoff (eds.). Sakralität und Heldentum. Vol. 6: Helden – Heroisierungen – Heroismen. Würzburg: Ergon. pp. 229–244. doi:10.5771/9783956503085. ISBN 9783956503085. Archived from the original on 13 August 2021.
- Hermann, Denis (1 May 2013). "Akhund Khurasani and the Iranian Constitutional Movement". Middle Eastern Studies. 49 (3): 430–453. doi:10.1080/00263206.2013.783828. ISSN 0026-3206. JSTOR 23471080. S2CID 143672216.
- Keddie, Nikki (2003). Modern Iran: Roots and Results of Revolution. Yale University Press.
- Imam Khomeini. Governance of the Jurist, Velayat-e Faqeeh; Islamic Government (PDF). Translated by Algar, Hamid. The Institute for Compilation and Publication of Imam Khomeini's Works.
- Khomeini, Ruhollah (1981). Algar, Hamid (ed.). Islam and Revolution : Writing and Declarations of Imam Khomeini. Translated by Algar, Hamid. Berkeley, CA: Mizan Press. ISBN 9781483547541.
- Khomeini, Ruhollah (1981). "A Warning to the Nation". In Algar, Hamid (ed.). Islam and Revolution : Writing and Declarations of Imam Khomeini. Translated by Algar, Hamid. Berkeley, CA: Mizan Press. pp. 169–173. ISBN 9781483547541. (from Kashf Al-Asrar by Rullah Khomeini, 1941, p. 221–224)
- Mirjam Künkler (24 May 2010). The Special Courts of the Clergy and the Repression of Dissident Clergy in Iran. SSRN.
- Mangol, Bayat (1991). Iran's First Revolution: Shi'ism and the Constitutional Revolution of 1905–1909. Oxford, New York: Oxford University Press. ISBN 978-0-19-506822-1.
- Misbah Yazdi, Muhammad Taqi (2003). "1: Wilayat al-Faqih, Exigency and Presuppositions". In Husayni, Sayyid ‘Abbas (ed.). A Cursory Glance at the Theory of Wilayat al-Faqih. Ahlul Bayt World Assembly.
- Misbah Yazdi, Muhammad Taqi (2003). "2: The Relationship between Religion and Politics". In Husayni, Sayyid ‘Abbas (ed.). A Cursory Glance at the Theory of Wilayat al-Faqih. Ahlul Bayt World Assembly.
- Misbah Yazdi, Muhammad Taqi (2003). "3: The Role of the People in the Islamic Government". In Husayni, Sayyid ‘Abbas (ed.). A Cursory Glance at the Theory of Wilayat al-Faqih. Ahlul Bayt World Assembly/Al-Islam.org.
- Misbah Yazdi, Muhammad Taqi (2003). "4. Arguments for Wilayat al-Faqih". In Husayni, Sayyid ‘Abbas (ed.). A Cursory Glance at the Theory of Wilayat al-Faqih. Ahlul Bayt World Assembly/Al-Islam.org.
- Misbah Yazdi, Muhammad Taqi (2003). "5: The Concept of Absolute Guardianship of the Jurist [Wilayat al-Faqih al-Mutlaqah]". In Husayni, Sayyid ‘Abbas (ed.). A Cursory Glance at the Theory of Wilayat al-Faqih. Ahlul Bayt World Assembly/Al-Islam.org.
- Misbah Yazdi, Muhammad Taqi (2003). "6: The Assembly of Experts and Wilayat al-Faqih". In Husayni, Sayyid ‘Abbas (ed.). A Cursory Glance at the Theory of Wilayat al-Faqih. Ahlul Bayt World Assembly/Al-Islam.org.
- Moin, Baqer (1999). Khomeini: Life of the Ayatollah. New York, NY: Thomas Dunne Books. ISBN 9781466893061.
- Momen, Moojan (1985). An Introduction to Shi'i Islam. New Haven, CT; London, England: Yale University Press. ISBN 0300035314.
- Olivier Roy (1994). The Failure of Political Islam. Translated by Carol Volk. Harvard University Press.
- Taheri, Amir (1985). The Spirit of Allah. Adler & Adler. ISBN 0-09-160320-X.
- Vaezi, Ahmed (2004). "What is Wilayat al-Faqih.". Shia Political Thought.
- Vaezi, Ahmed (2004). "What is Wilayat al-Faqih. The Dominion Of The Wali Al-Faqih". Shia Political Thought.
