= Muhammad Zayni al-Baghdadi =

Sayyid Muhammad Zayni al-Baghdadi Husseini
- محمد الزيني البغدادي
- Born: 1735; Najaf
- Died: 1801 (aged 65–66); Kadhimiyah
- Occupations: Islamic scholar, poet, writer and salonnière
- Children: Jawah Siahpush (1760-1831)

Sayyid Muhammad ibn Zayn al-Din Ahmad al-Hassani al-Baghdadi, commonly known as Muhammad Zayni al-Baghdadi (1735 - 1801) was an Ottoman Iraqi Muslim scholar, literary and poet.
He was born in Najaf into a Shia Muslim family and taught by his father and the great Shi'a scholars of Najaf, such as Mahdi Bahr al-Ulum. Worked in the field of religious advocacy and became prominent in religious literature. Wrote poetry in Arabic and Persian. His works includes a Diwan of poetry and some books in Tafsir and Arabic literary sciences.
He is the father of poet Jawad Siahpush.

== Life ==
His full nasab is Muhammad bin Ahmad Zayn al-Din bin Ali bin Sayf al-Din bin Ridha al-Din al-Hassani al-Baghdadi, ends to Hassan ibn Ali. Born in Najaf in 1735 and grew up there by his father, who emigrated from Baghdad to Najaf, and taught under great Shi'a scholars of Najaf, including Mahdi Bahr al-Ulum.
He was a member of Ma'rakat al-Khamis (Battle of Thursday) a literary seminar. Zayni was a salon holder, welcoming poets and writers on the holiday of each week, that made him a leading literary figure in the late 17th century in Najaf, growing capital of Twelver Shi'a Muslims.
He died in 1801 in Kadhimiya, and was buried there.
