= Molla Ahmad Naraqi =

Shi'i cleric (1771–1829)

- ملا احمد بن محمد مهدی بن ابی‌ذر نراقی

Personal life
- Born: 1185 AH (1771 CE) Naraq, Kashan, Persia
- Died: 1245 AH (1829 CE) Kashan, Qajar Iran
- Resting place: Imam Ali Shrine, Najaf, Iraq
- Parent: Muhammad Mahdi Naraqi
- Era: Qajar period
- Region: Iran
- Main interest(s): Islamic jurisprudence, usul al-fiqh, theology, Islamic philosophy, ethics, mysticism, hadith, and poetry
- Notable idea: Wilāyat al-faqīh
- Notable work(s): ʿAwāʾid al-Ayyām, Mustanad al-Shīʿa, Miʿrāj al-Saʿāda, Manāhij al-Aḥkām, Miftāḥ al-Aḥkām, Asrār al-Ḥajj, Khazāʾin, and Ṭāqdis
- Known for: Shia jurisprudence, Mustanad al-Shia, ʿAwāʾid al-Ayyām, and his writings on the authority of the jurist
- Other names: Fāḍil al-Narāqī; Fāḍil Naraqi
- Pen name: Ṣafāʾī
- Occupation: Mujtahid, jurist, theologian, philosopher, ethicist, mystic, and poet

Religious life
- Religion: Islam
- Denomination: Shia
- School: Usuli
- Sect: Twelver
- Jurisprudence: Ja'fari

Muslim leader
- Teacher: Muhammad Mahdi Naraqi, Muhammad-Baqer Behbahani, Muhammad Mahdi Bahr al-Ulum, Ja'far Kashif al-Ghita, Mirza Mahdi Shahristani, and Sayyid Ali Karbalāʾī
- Students: Murtada al-Ansari, Mulla Muhammad Mahdi Naraqi, Mirza Abu al-Qasim Naraqi, Mulla Muhammad-Javad Naraqi, Mirza Muhammad-Nasir Naraqi, Muhammad-Taqi Kashani, Mulla Ali Madad Savuji Kashani, and Mirza Abu Turab Natanzī
- Influenced by: Muhammad Mahdi Naraqi, Aliqoli Jadid-ol-Eslam
- Influenced: Ruhollah Khomeini

Molla Ahmad Naraqi (Persian: ملا احمد نراقی; 1185–1245 A.H./1771–1829 C.E.) also known as known as “Fauzel Narauqee”, was a Shi'i cleric ("mullah"), who has been called "the first Shi‘i jurisprudent to argue for wilayat al-faqıh al-siyasıyah, or "the divine mandate of the jurisprudent to rule" during the occultation of the Imam. The concept of wilayat al-faqıh or Velayat-e Faqıh (Guardianship of the Islamic Jurist) came to the attention of the world when Ayatollah Ruhollah Khomeini led the Islamic Iranian Revolution in 1978–79 and established the Islamic Republic of Iran using wilayat al-faqıh as its governing principal. Naraqi's work called for the system in his technical fiqh work entitled Awa’id al-ayyam (Note: See: Kadivar 1998a, 17-18; 94-96; Kadivar 1998b, 105; Kazemi Moussavi 1985, 40-44; Dabashi 1989, 293-296) cited in MATSUNAGA) predating the call by Ayatollah Ruhollah Khomeini for this system in his lectures and book Islamic Government by more than a century.

Unlike Khomeini, Molla Naraqi never tried to establish or called for the establishment of a state based on wilayat al-faqıh al-siyasıyah.

== Biography ==
Naraqi was born on 14 Jumada al-Thani 1185 A.H. during the reign of Karim Khan Zand. He was tutored by his father from the age of 5 until 20. He received the title of mujtahid at the age of 15 and traveled to Iraq with his father in order to continue the hawza studies "in the main center of Shia hawza where he was a student under Moḥammad Mahdī Baḥr al-ʿUlūm, Sayyed Ali Tabautabau’ee, Sayyed Mahdi Shahrestani, and Sheikh Mohammad Ja’far Najafee. After his father Molla Mahdee died in 1209 A.H., Naraqi returned to Kashan to take over his father’s hawza in that region.

How many sons Naraqi had is disputed. According to one source he had two sons, both of whom became scholars. Hauj Molla Mohammad, became known as “Hojjat-ol-islam”, and received the title of “Khautam-ol-mojtahedeen”, and was the son-in-law of Mirza-ye-qomee. Nasiroddeen also became a scholar.
