= Moḥammad Mahdī Baḥr al-ʿUlūm =

18th-century Iraqi Islamic scholar and poet

Ayatollah Sayyid Moḥammad Mehdī Baḥr al-ʿUlūm

Personal life
- Born: 1742 Karbala, Iraq
- Died: 1797 (entre los 54 y los 55 años) Najaf, Iraq
- Resting place: Najaf, Iraq
- Main interest(s): Islamic philosophy, Usul al-fiqh, Hadith, Fiqh, Tafsir

Religious life
- Religion: Islam

Muslim leader
- Disciple of: Shaykh Yusef Bahrani, Mirza Mehdi Shahid Khorasani, Shaykh Mehdi Ibn Muhammad Fotuni Ameli, Shaykh Muhammad Taqi Doraqi, Muhammad Baqer Hezar Jaribi
- Influenced: Muhammad Zayni al-Baghdadi

Al-Sayyid Moḥammad Mehdī Baḥr al-ʿUlūm or Bahrululoom (Arabic: السيد محمد مهدی بحر العلوم) (b.1155 AH (1742 CE)—d.1212 AH (1797 CE)) was a mystic and a Shiite religious authority in the 12th and 13th centuries AH.

== Birth and lineage ==
‘Seyyed Mohammad Mehdi Ibne Mortaza Ibne Mohammad Brujerdi Tabatabaie al- Baḥr al-ʿUlūm’ was a famous scholar in the 12th century (A.H.). He was fully proficient in jurisprudence, principle of jurisprudence, Hadith, theology, exegesis of the Quran and the science of transmitters. He was born in Karbala on Eid al-Fitr (at the end of Ramadan) in 1155 (A.H.); his household was related to the Majlesi household such that Baḥr al-ʿUlūm mention first Majlesi as grandfather and second Majlesi as uncle.

== Education ==
He started his education in his birthplace where his father and Sheykh Yusef Bahrani (the writer of the book of Hadaiq) taught him, then he went to Najaf to complete his education. He went to Mashhad in 186 (A.H.) and lived there for seven years. While he was there he attended the classes and participated in different scientific sessions as well as learning philosophy from Mirza Mehdi Shahid Khorasani. His teacher, because of his extensive knowledge, called him Baḥr al-ʿUlūm (ocean of knowledge ). This title was not awarded to any one else other than him until that time and his family inherited this title from him and they bear it now.

== Teachers ==
He was trained under the supervision of the Great Masters in religious sciences. Some of them are as follow: Shaykh Yusef Bahrani, Mirza Mehdi Shahid Khorasani, Shaykh Mehdi Ibn Muhammad Fotuni Ameli, Shaykh Muhammad Taqi Doraqi, and Muhammad Baqer Hezar Jaribi.

On the advice of his teachers, Baḥr al-ʿUlūm went back to Najaf to teach. Baḥr al-ʿUlūm went to Hajj in 193 (A.H.) and also taught there, he taught the four schools of jurisprudence as well as other sciences which was attended by many students from many different sects. some of them are as follow: Sayyed Sadr Al-din Ameli, Sheykh Jafar Najafi, Sayyed Jawad Ameli, Sheykh Abu Ali Haeri, Molla Ahmad Naraqi, Sayyed Muhammad Mojahed, Sayyed Abul Qasem Khonsari, Sayyed Deldar Ali Lakahnavi.

== General religious leadership ==
His moral courage and spirit of reconciliation between Muslims was the cause of his collaboration with the great contemporary scholars on the performing of social duties. Some of his social activities are mentioned in the following: - He guided people to follow Sheykh Jafar Najafi in the affairs regarding jurisprudence. - He introduced Sheykh Muh yedin to perform judgement as a judge. - He announced the appointment of pious scholar and the congregational prayer leader of Hindi mosque as the leadership of the congregational prayer. - He encouraged his student Seyyed Javad Amuli –-the author of the Miftahul Kirama—to compile the books including the writing his own teachings which was based on the book of al-Wafi written by Feyz Kashani. - Allameh Baḥr al-ʿUlūm himself managed the people’s affairs as well as teaching jurisprudence and Hadith. Bahr-al-Ulum was not severe in his daily life and his generosity and loftiness of purpose was proverbial, so some scholars said that he had mystic tendencies . The effect of this tendencies would not be denied in some of his students and the scholars after his death. All of the contemporary scholars accepted that he had a great knowledge and piety, so Vahid Behbahani, as his teacher because of possibility of lacking the ability of Ijtahad in the last years of his life, asked him to express his opinion in jurisprudential problems. It is repeatedly stated that he had visited the Imam al-Zaman (a). It is worth mentioning that not only contemporary scholars but also latter day religious scholars did not deny this event. Baḥr al-ʿUlūm's biographers report that he was favoured by miraculous communication with the Prophet and the imams, especially the Twelfth Imam. It is repeatedly stated that he had visited the Imam al-Zaman Mehdi (a). Not only his contemporary scientists accepted this event but also the latter-day scholars confirmed it.

== Works ==
- He left many works in diverse religious sciences such as Jurisprudence and Hadith and praying. Some of them are as follow:
- al-Masabih(the keys in jurisprudence)
- al-Durrah al-Najafiyyah (Najafian Gem)
- Meshkat al-Hidayah
- al-Fawaed al-Rejaliyyah
- Tuhfat al-Kiram
- Collection of his poems in praise of Shiite Imams

== Demise ==
Allameh Seyyed Mohammad Mehdi Baḥr al-ʿUlūm finally died in Rajab, 1212 A.H. when he was 57. He was buried next to the grave of Sheykh al-Tusi in the shrine of Imam Ali.

== See also ==
- http://www.iranicaonline.org/articles/bahr-al-olum-sayyed-mohammad
