= Islamic Government =

Manifesto by Ayatollah Khomeini for a theocratic Islamic state

Islamic Government: Governance of the Jurist
- Author: Ruhollah Khomeini; translated by Hamid Algar
- Language: Translated into English
- Subject: Islam and state
- Publisher: Manor Books, Mizan Press, Alhoda UK
- Publication date: 1970, 1979, 1982, 2002
- Publication place: Iran and United Kingdom
- Pages: 139 pages
- ISBN: 964-335-499-7
- OCLC: 254905140

Islamic Government (Persian: حکومت اسلامی, romanized: Ḥokūmat-i Eslāmī), or Islamic Government: Jurist's Guardianship (Persian: حکومت اسلامی ولایت فقیه, romanized: Ḥokūmat-i Eslāmī Wilāyat-i Faqīh) is a book by the Iranian cleric, Islamic jurist and revolutionary, Ayatollah Ruhollah Khomeini. First published in 1970, it is perhaps the most influential document written in modern times in support of theocratic rule.

The book argues that government should be run in accordance with traditional Islamic law (sharia), and for this to happen, a leading Islamic jurist (faqīh) must provide political "guardianship" (wilayat in Arabic, velāyat in Persian) over the people and nation, hence the term Guardianship of the Jurist, or Velayat-e Faqih in Persian. Following the Iranian Revolution, a modified form of this doctrine was incorporated into the 1979 Constitution of Islamic Republic of Iran. Drafted by an assembly made up primarily of disciples of Khomeini, it stipulated that he would be the first faqih "guardian" (Vali-ye faqih) or "Supreme Leader" of Iran.

== History ==
From January 21 to February 8, 1970, while in exile in Iraq in the holy city of Najaf, Khomeini gave a series of 19 lectures on Islamic Government to a group of his students. Notes of the lectures were soon made into a book that appeared under three different titles:

- The Islamic Government,
- Authority of the Jurist, and
- A Letter from Imam Musavi Kashef al-Qita (titled to evade Iranian censorship).

The book was smuggled into Iran and widely distributed to supporters of Khomeini before the revolution.

Controversy surrounds how much of the book's success came from its persuasiveness, religiosity, etc., and how much from the success of the political movement of the author (Khomeini), who is generally considered to have been the "undisputed" leader of the Iranian revolution.

Many observers of the revolution maintain that while the book was distributed to Khomeini's core supporters in Iran, Khomeini and his aides were careful not to publicize the book or the idea of wilayat al-faqih to outsiders, knowing that groups crucial to the revolution's success—secular and Islamic modernist Iranians—were under the impression that the revolution was being fought for democracy, not theocracy. It was only when Khomeini's core supporters had consolidated their hold on power that wilayat al-faqih was made known to the general public and written into the country's new Islamic constitution.

The book has been translated into several languages including French, Arabic, Turkish and Urdu. The English translation that is most commonly found, considered to be the "only reliable" translation", and that is approved by the Iranian government, is that of Hamid Algar, an English-born convert to Islam, scholar of Iran and the Middle East, and supporter of Khomeini and the Islamic Revolution. It is available online, and can be found in Algar's book Islam and Revolution, and in a stand-alone edition published in Iran by the "Institute for Compilation and Publication of Imam Khomeini's Works", which was also published by Alhoda UK.

The one other English language edition of the book, also titled Islamic Government, is a stand-alone edition, translated by the U.S. government's Joint Publications Research Service. Algar considers this translation inferior to his own—being "crude" and "unreliable" and based on the Arabic translation rather than the original Persian—and claims its publication by Manor Books is "vulgar" and "sensational" in its attacks on the Ayatollah Khomeini. (Whether the original language of the Islamic Government lectures was Persian or Arabic is disputed.)

== Contents ==
=== Scope ===
Khomeini and his supporters before the revolution were from Iran, his movement was focused on Iran, and most of his criticisms of non-Islamic government refer to the imperial government of Iran that he sought to overthrow. However, Khomeini made it clear that Islamic government was (eventually) to be universal, not limited to a single Islamic country or even to the Muslim world. According to Khomeini, this would not be that difficult because if Islamic government is established, "none of the governments now existing in the world would be able to resist it; they would all capitulate".

=== Importance of Islamic Government ===
==== Protecting religion ====
Without a leader to serve the people as "a vigilant trustee", enforcing law and order, Islam would fall victim "to obsolescence and decay", its "rites and institutions", "customs and ordinances" disappearing or mutating as "heretical innovators", "atheists and unbelievers" subtracted and added doctrines and practices.

==== Providing justice ====
Khomeini believed that the need for governance of the faqih has "little need of demonstration, and is obvious" to good Muslims. "Anyone" with "some general awareness" of the beliefs and ordinances of Islam would "unhesitatingly give his assent" to the principle of the governance of the faqih "as soon as he encounters it."

Nonetheless he provides several reasons why Islamic government is necessary:

- to prevent encroachment by "oppressive ruling classes on the rights of the weak," and the plundering and corrupting of the people for the sake of "pleasure and material interest";
- to prevent "innovation" (bid'ah) in Islamic law and the legislating of "anti-Islamic laws by sham parliaments";
- to preserve "the Islamic order" and keep all individuals on "the just path of Islam without any deviation";
- to "reverse" the decline of Islam brought about by the absence of "executive power" in the hands of "just fuqaha ... in the land inhabited by Muslims";
- and to destroy "the influence of foreign powers in the Islamic lands". (Note: All page numbers refer to Hamid Algar's book, Islam and Revolution, Writings and Declarations Of Imam Khomeini (Mizan, 1981).)

The operation of Islamic government is superior to non-Islamic government in many ways. Khomeini sometimes compares it to (allegedly) un-Islamic governments in general throughout the Muslim world and more often contrasts it specifically with the government of Shah Mohammad Reza Pahlavi—though he never mentions the Shah by name.

Compared to the justice, impartiality, thrift, self-denial, and general virtue of the early leaders of Islam we know of from literature passed down over 1000 years, "Non-Islamic" government:

- is mired in red tape thanks to "superfluous bureaucracies";
- suffers from "reckless" spending, and "constant embezzlement", in the case of Iran, forcing it to seek foreign aid or loans from abroad, and in so doing, "bow in submission" before America and Britain;
- has excessively harsh punishments (such as capital punishment for the possession of small amounts of heroin);
- creates an "unjust economic order" which divides the people "into two groups: oppressors and oppressed";
- does not "truly belong to the people", though it may be made up of elected representatives.

While some might think the complexity of the modern world would move the Muslims of 1970 to learn from countries that have modernized ahead of them, and even borrow laws from them, this is not only un-Islamic but also entirely unnecessary. The laws of God (sharia), cover "all human affairs ... There is not a single topic in human life for which Islam has not provided instruction and established a norm." As a result, Islamic government will be much easier to establish than some might think.

"The entire system of government and administration, together with necessary laws, lies ready for you. If the administration of the country calls for taxes, Islam has made the necessary provision; and if laws are needed, Islam has established them all. ... Everything is ready and waiting."

For this reason, Khomeini declines "to go into details" on such things as "how the penal provisions of the law are to be implemented".

==== Required by Islam ====
In addition to the reasons above on why the guardianship of the jurist is superior to secular non-Islamic government, Khomeini also gives much space to doctrinal reasons that (he argues) establish proof that the rule of jurists is required by Islam.

No sacred texts of Shia (or Sunni) Islam include a straightforward statement that the Muslim community should be ruled over by Islamic jurists or Islamic scholars. Traditionally, Shia Islam follows a pivotal Shi'i hadith where Muhammad passed down his power to command Muslims to his cousin Ali ibn Abi Talib, the first of twelve descendants of Ali who are the"Imams" Twelve Shi'i Islam. This line of descendants were the legitimate rulers of Islam, though never in a position to actually rule, and the line stopped with the occultation (disappearance) of the last Imam, Muhammad al-Mahdi, in 939 CE (see: Muhammad al-Mahdi#Birth and early life according to Twelver Shi'a). While waiting for the reappearance of that Twelfth Imam, Shia jurists have tended to stick to one of three approaches to the state: cooperating with it, trying to influence policies by becoming active in politics, or most commonly, remaining aloof from it. (Note: Ervand Abrahamian offers three slightly different options: shunning the authorities as usurpers, grudging acceptance of them, wholehearted acceptance -- especially if the state was Shi'i.)

In contrast, Khomeini insists there are "numerous traditions [hadith] that indicate the scholars of Islam are to exercise rule during the Occultation", and tries to prove this by explicating several Quranic verses and hadith of the Shi'a Imams. The first proof he offers is an analysis of a saying attributed to the first Imam, 'Ali, who in addressing a well-connected judge he considered corrupt, said:

'The seat you are occupying is filled by someone who is a prophet, the legatee of a prophet, or else a sinful wretch.'

While this might sound like ʿAli is simply remonstrating against the judge who had exceeded his authority and sinned, Khomeini reasons that hadith's use of the term judge must refer to a trained jurist (fuqaha), as the "function of a judge belongs to just fuqaha [plural for faqih]" ', and since trained jurists are neither sinful wretches nor prophets, "we deduce from the tradition quoted above that the fuqaha are the legatees"; and since legatees of Muhammad, such as Imams, have the same power to command and rule Muslims as Muhammad did, it is therefore demonstrated that the saying, `The seat you are occupying is filled by someone who is a prophet, the legatee of a prophet, or else a sinful wretch,` proves that Islamic jurists are the rightful rulers of Muslims and others.

Other examples the follow include:

- "Obey those among you who have authority" (Q.4:59)

(the "authorities" in the verse referring to religious judges according to Khomeini).

- Combining two hadith of Ali:
  - "those who transmit my statements and my traditions and teach them to the people" (which must mean, according to Khomeini, trained Islamic legal scholars) are my successors;
  - "all believers" should obey my successors",

indicates to Khomeini that Ali's transmitters are jurists, and so are his successors, and so must be obeyed.

- The Seventh Imam had praised religious judges as "the fortress of Islam", which indicates not just that the fuqaha generally serve to strengthen the religion, but must mean that they are entrusted with preserving Islam, which means they have an active social role, (according to Khomeini).
- The twelfth Imam had preached that future generations should obey those who knew his teachings, since those people were his representatives among the people in the same way as he was God's representative among believers. This must mean that the ulama are not only "the point of reference" for points of Islamic law but also for "contemporary social problems", according to Khomeini.
- The Sixth Imam said: "The ulama are the heirs of the prophets. The prophets did not leave a single dinar or dirham for an inheritance. Rather they left knowledge as an inheritance and whosoever takes from it, has taken an abundant share". Khomeini interprets this to mean that the ulama have not only inherited knowledge from the prophets, but also "the Prophets' authority" to rule.
- God had created sharia to guide the Islamic community (ummah), the state to implement sharia, and faqih to understand and implement sharia.

Not only is the rule of Islamic jurists and obedience toward them an obligation of Islam, it is as important a religious obligation as any a Muslim has. Obedience to holders of authority like Islamic jurists "is actually an expression of obedience to God." Preserving Islam "is more necessary even than prayer and fasting" and (Khomeini argues) without Islamic government, Islam cannot be preserved.

It is also the duty of Muslims to "destroy ... all traces" of any other sort of government other than true Islamic governance, because these are "systems of unbelief".

=== Islamic Government ===
The basis of Islamic government is said to be justice, which is defined as following sharia (Islamic law) exclusively. Therefore, the theory goes, those holding government posts should have extensive knowledge of sharia (Islamic jurists being trained in sharia are such people), and the country's ruler should be a faqih (Note: Khomeini's English translator defines a faqih as a person "learned in the principles and ordinances of Islamic law, or more generally, in all aspects of the faith.") who "surpasses all others in knowledge" of Islamic law and justice — known as a marja`—as well as having intelligence and administrative ability.

While this faqih rules, it might be said that the ruler is actually sharia law itself because, "the law of Islam, divine command, has absolute authority over all individuals and the Islamic government. Everyone, including the Most Noble Messenger [Muhammad] and his successors, is subject to law and will remain so for all eternity ... "

The governance of the faqih is equivalent to "the appointment of a guardian for a minor." Just as God is said to have established Muhammad as the "leader and ruler" of early Muslims, "making obedience to him obligatory", so, to (Khomeini argues), "the fuqaha (plural of faqih) must be leaders and rulers" over Muslims today. Some Muslims may hesitate to put Islamic jurists on the same level as Muhammad and the Imams, but Khomeini explains while the "spiritual virtues" and "status" of Muhammad and the Imams are considered greater than those of contemporary faqih, their power is not, because Muhammad and the Imam's virtue "does not confer increased governmental powers".

Khomeini states that Islamic government "truly belongs to the people", not in the sense of being made up of representatives chosen by the people through a free election, but because it enforces Islamic laws recognized by Muslims as "worthy of obedience'. It is "not constitutional in the current sense of word, i.e., based on the approval of laws in accordance with the opinion of the majority" with executive, legislative and judicial branches of government; in an Islamic government he says the legislative assembly has been replaced by "a simple planning body" a legislature being unnecessary because "no one has the right to legislate" except "the Divine Legislator", and God has already provided all the laws anyone needs in the sharia. (Note: The Islamic Republic of Iran does have a legislature, though some have argued it has been kept in a very subordinate position in keeping with Khomeini's idea of Islamic government by Islamic jurists, and Iran's executive, parliament, and judiciary branches "are overseen by several bodies dominated by the clergy".)

Islamic government raises revenue "on the basis of the taxes that Islam has established", namely khums (a 20% tax on commercial profits), zakat (a tithe of 2.5%), jizya (a tax on non-Muslims), and kharaj (a tax on land owned by non-Muslims). (Note: khums is a traditional Islamic required religious obligation of any Muslims to pay one-fifth of their acquired wealth from the spoils of war and according to Khomeini "all agricultural and commercial profits and all natural resources"; zakat is the required religious obligation of alms giving and one of the pillars of Islam. It is customarily 2.5% of a Muslim's total savings and wealth above a minimum amount known as nisab each lunar year; jizya is a tax on permanent non-Muslim residents but has no set percentage or amount; and; kharaj is a type of traditional individual Islamic tax on agricultural land and its produce.) This will be plenty because khums is a "huge source of income".

Islamic Government, says Khomeini, will be just but also unsparing with "troublesome" groups that cause "corruption" in Muslim society, and damage "Islam and the Islamic state," giving the example of Muhammad, who killed the men of the Bani Qurayza tribe and enslaved the women and children after the tribe collaborated with Muhammad's enemies and then refused to convert to Islam.

Khomeini says that Islamic government will follow 'Ali, whose seat of command was simply the corner of a mosque, threatened to have his daughter's hand cut off if she did not pay back a loan from the treasury, and who "lived more frugally than the most impoverished of our students". The government will follow in the foot steps of "victorious and triumphant" armies of early Muslims who set "out from the mosque to go into battle" and feared "only God". They will follow the Quranic command: "prepare against them whatever force you can muster and horses tethered" (Quran 8:60). In fact, (Khomeini says), "if the form of government willed by Islam were to come into being, none of the governments now existing in the world would be able to resist it; they would all capitulate".

=== Why has Islamic Government not been established? ===
==== Western conspiracies ====
If the need for governance of the faqih is obvious to "anyone who has some general awareness of the beliefs and ordinances of Islam", why has it not yet been established? Khomeini spends a large part of his book explaining why.

The "historical roots" of the opposition are Western unbelievers who want

"to keep us backward, to keep us in our present miserable state so they can exploit our riches, our underground wealth, our lands and our human resources. They want us to remain afflicted and wretched, and our poor to be trapped in their misery ... they and their agents wish to go on living in huge palaces and enjoying lives of abominable luxury.

Foreign experts have studied our country and have discovered all our mineral reserves -- gold, copper, petroleum, and so on. They have also made an assessment of our people's intelligence and come to the conclusion that the only barrier blocking their way are Islam and the religious leadership."

These Westerners "have known the power of Islam themselves for it once ruled part of Europe, and ... know that true Islam is opposed to their activities." Westerns have set about deceiving Muslims, using their native "agents" to spread the falsehood that "Islam consists of a few ordinances concerning menstruation and parturition". Planning to promote the vices of fornication, alcohol drinking and charging interest on loans "in the Islamic world", Westerners have led Muslims to believe that "Islam has laid down no laws" against these practices. Ignorance has reached such a state that when "Islam commands its followers to engage in warfare or defense in order to make men submit to laws that are beneficial for them and kills a few corrupt people", naive people ask why such violence is necessary.

The enemies of Islam target the vulnerable young: "The agents of imperialism are busy in every corner of the Islamic world drawing our youth away from us with their evil propaganda."

==== British and Jews ====
This imperialist attack on Islam is not some ad hoc tactic to assist the imperial pursuit of power or profit, but an elaborate, 300-year-long plan.

"The British imperialists penetrated the countries of the East more than 300 years ago. Being knowledgeable about all aspects of these countries, they drew up elaborate plans for assuming control of them."

In addition to the British there are the Jews:

"From the very beginning, the historical movement of Islam has had to contend with the Jews, for it was they who first established anti-Islamic propaganda and engaged in various stratagems, and as you can see, this activity continues down to the present.

We must protest and make the people aware that the Jews and their foreign backers are opposed to the very foundations of Islam and wish to establish Jewish domination throughout the world."

==== Local non-Muslims ====
While the main danger of unbelievers comes from foreign (European and American) imperialists, non-Muslims in Iran and other Muslim countries pose a danger too,

"centers of evil propaganda run by the churches, the Zionists, and the Baha'is in order to lead our people astray and make them abandon the ordinances and teaching of Islam ... These centers must be destroyed."

==== Clerical enemies ====
The imperialist war against Islam has even penetrated, (in Khomeini's view), the seminaries where the scholars of Islam are trained. There, Khomeini notes, "If someone wishes to speak about Islamic government and the establishment of the Islamic government, he must observe the principles of taqiyya, [i.e. dissimulation, the permission to lie when one's life is in danger or in defence of Islam], and count upon the opposition of those who have sold themselves to imperialism". If these "pseudo-saints do not wake up" Khomeini threatens, "we will adopt a different attitude toward them." As for those clerics who serve the government, "they do not need to be beaten much," but "our youths must strip them of their turbans."

== Influences ==
=== Traditional Islamic ===
Khomeini himself claims Mirza Hasan Shirazi (1815-1895), Mirza Muhammad Taqi Shirazi, Kashif al-Ghita, as clerics preceding him who made what were "in effect" "governmental rulings" (Mirza Hasan Shirazi called for a boycott of tobacco in protest of a concession to the British), thus establishing de facto Islamic Government by Islamic jurists. Some credit "earlier notions of political and juridical authority" in Iran's Safavid period. Khomeini is said to have cited nineteenth-century Shi'i jurist Mulla Ahmad Naraqi (d. 1829) and Shaikh Muhammad Hussain Naini (d. 1936) as authorities who held a similar view to himself on the political role of the ulama. An older influence is Abu Nasr Al-Farabi, and his book, The Principles of the People of the Virtuous City, (al-madina[t] al-fadila, (Note: It has been translated by Richard Walzer as Al-Farabi on the Perfect state, pp. 34-35, 172.) which has been called "a Muslim version of Plato's Republic").

Another influence is said to be Mohammad Baqir al-Sadr, a cleric and author of books on developing Islamic alternatives to capitalism and socialism, whom Khomeini met in Najaf. (Note: Al-Sadr is author of Falsafatuna ("Our Philosophy") and Iqtisaduna ("Our Economics").)

=== Non-traditional and non-Islamic ===
Other observers credit the "Islamic Left," specifically Ali Shariati, as the origin of important concepts of Khomeini's Waliyat al-faqih, particularly the abolition of monarchy and the idea that an "economic order" has divided the people "into two groups: oppressors and oppressed." The Confederation of Iranian Students in Exile and the famous pamphlet Gharbzadegi by the ex-Tudeh writer Jalal Al-e-Ahmad are also thought to have influenced Khomeini. This is in spite of the fact that Khomeini loathed Marxism in general, and Shariati harshly criticized the traditional Shia clergy for (allegedly) standing in the way of the revolutionary potential of the Shi'a masses. Khomeini reference to governments based on constitutions, divided into three branches, and containing planning agencies, also belie a strict adherence to precedents set by the rule of the Prophet Muhammad and Imam Ali, 1400 years ago.

Scholar Vali Nasr believes the ideal of an Islamic government ruled by the ulama "relied heavily" on Greek philosopher Plato's book The Republic, and its vision of "a specially educated `guardian` class led by a `philosopher-king`".

== Reception ==
=== Doctrinal ===
Velayat-e Faqih has been praised (by American academic Hamid Dabashi) as a "masterful construction of a relentless argument, supported by the most sacred canonical sources of Shi'i Islam ..."

The response from high-level Shi'a religious scholars to Velayat-e Faqih was far less positive. Of the dozen Shia Grand Ayatollahs alive at the time of the Iranian Revolution, only one besides Khomeini — Hussein-Ali Montazeri — approved of Khomeini's concept. (He would later disavow it entirely in 1988.) (Note: See, for example, Reza Zanjani.) When Khomeini died in 1989, the Assembly of Experts of Iran felt compelled to amend the constitution to remove the requirement that his successor as Supreme Leader be one of jurists who surpass "all others in knowledge" of Islamic law and justice -- i.e. one of the Marja' mentioned above), because all the senior Shi'i jurists "distrusted their version of Islam". (Note: The cleric the regime chose to be Supreme Leader, Ali Khamenei, was not only not a marja' but was not an ayatollah.) Grand Ayatollah Abul-Qassim Khoei, the leading Shia ayatollah at the time the book was published, rejected Khomeini's argument on the grounds that

- The authority of faqih — is limited to the guardianship of widows and orphans — could not be extended by human beings to the political sphere.
- In the absence of the Hidden Imam (the 12th and last Shi'a Imam), the authority of jurisprudence was not the preserve of one or a few fuqaha.

Another prominent Shi'i cleric who went on record about the doctrine of Velayat-e Faqih was the late Grand Ayatollah Mohammad Hussein Fadlallah of Lebanon -- "widely seen as the 'godfather'" of the Iranian-backed Hezbollah, and one of only three Shia Maraji of Lebanon before he died in 2010. Despite having initially supported the Iranian Revolution, Fadlallah criticized what he saw as the absolute power the Iranian clergy ruled with, and called for a system of checks and balances that would prevent the scholars from becoming dictators. In a 2009 interview, he stated "without hesitation":

I don't believe that Welayat al-Faqih has any role in Lebanon. Perhaps some Lebanese commit themselves to the policy of the Guardian Jurist, as some of them commit themselves to the policy of the Vatican [Lebanon's large Maronite community is Catholic]. My opinion is that I don't see the Guardianship of the Jurist as the definitive Islamic regime.

Khomeini cited two earlier clerical authorities — Mulla Ahmad Naraqi and Shaikh Muhammad Hussain Naini (mentioned above) — as holding similar views to himself on the importance of the ulama holding political power, but neither made "it the central theme of their political theory as Khomeini does," although they may have hinted "at this in their writings", according to Baháʼí scholar of Shia Islam, Moojan Momen. Momen also argues that the hadith Khomeini quotes in support of his concept of velayat-e faqih, either have "a potential ambiguity which makes the meaning controversial," or are considered `weak` (da'if) by virtue of their chain of transmitters.

In a religion where innovation (bid'ah) is a menace to be constantly on guard for, Iranian historian Ervand Abrahamian writes that Khomeini's ideas "broke sharply" from Shi'i traditions. Discussion/debate had gone on and off for "eleven centuries" over what approach Shi'a should take towards the state—aloofness or some kind of cooperation varying from grudging compliance to obedience. But until the appearance of Khomeini's book, "no Shi'i writer ever explicitly contended that monarchies per se were illegitimate or that the senior clergy had the authority to control the state." Khomeini himself had adopted the traditional Shia attitude of refraining from criticizing the monarch (let alone calling him illegitimate) for much of his career, and even after bitterly attacking Muhammad Reza Shah in the mid-1960s, didn't attack the monarchy as such until his lectures on Islamic Government in 1970. Though Islamic Government implicitly threatened clerical opponents of rule by faqih, for decades before, Khomeini had been "extremely close", (serving as the teaching assistant and personal secretary), to Hossein Borujerdi, the premier Shia cleric of his age, known for being conservative and "highly apolitical". Scholar of Islam Vali Nasr describes Khomeini's concept as reducing Shi'ism "to a strange (and as it would turn out violent) parody of Plato".

=== Functional ===
Islamic Government is criticized on utilitarian (as opposed to religious) grounds, by those who argue that Islamic government as established in Iran by Khomeini has simply not done what Khomeini said Islamic government by jurists would do. The goals of ending poverty, (Note: In the first six years after the overthrow of the Shah (from 1979 through 1985), The Iranian government's "own Planning and Budget Organization reported that ... absolute poverty rose by nearly 45%!") corruption, (Note: After the mayor of Iran's largest city Tehran was arrested for corruption in 1998, ex-President Rafsanjani] said in a sermon `Graft has always existed, there are always people who are corrupt....`)) national debt, (Note: Khomeini himself did not run up debt but in the decade after his death, under his faqih guardian successor Iran not only went back into debt, but built it up to almost four times the putatively shameful debt the monarchy left behind in 1979. Spending that Iranian economists criticized as "reckless.") harsh punishments, (Note: In 1979 Revolutionary Judge Sadegh Khalkhali ordered the execution of 20 persons found guilty of trafficking in drugs. Over ... several weeks, he sent scores of alleged drug smugglers, peddlers, users and others to their death, often on the flimsiest evidence. By the end of August, some 200 persons had been executed on Khalkhali's orders. This figure rose considerably before" Khalkhali was ousted on unrelated charges.)) or compelling all other governments to surrender before the armies of the Islamic government, (Note: On the start of Iran's war with Saddam Hussein's secular state of Iraq, Khomeini stated there were no conditions for a truce except that "the regime in Baghdad must fall and must be replaced by an Islamic Republic" Six years, hundreds of thousands of Iranian lives, and $100's of billions later, faced with desertions and resistance against the conscription, Khomeini signed a peace agreement stating "... we have no choice and we should give in to what God wants us to do ... I reiterate that the acceptance of this issue is more bitter than poison for me, but I drink this chalice of poison for the Almighty and for His satisfaction.") have not been met. But even more modest and basic goals like downsizing the government bureaucracy, (Note: "Khomeini had to preside over a state bureaucracy three times larger than that of Mohammad Reza Shah.") using only senior religious jurists or marjas for the post of faqih guardian/Supreme Leader, (Note: On April 24, 1989, Article 109 of the Iranian constitution, requiring that the Leader be a marja'-e taqlid, was removed. New wording in constitutional articles 5, 107, 109, 111, required him to be `a pious and just faqih, aware of the exigencies of the time, courageous, and with good managerial skills and foresight.` If there are a number of candidates, the person with the best `political and jurisprudential` vision should have the priority.` According to biographer Baqer Moin, "The change was immense. [Khomeini's] theory of Islamic government was based on the principle that the right to rule is the exclusive right of the faqih, the expert on Islamic law.") or implementing sharia law and protecting it from innovation, have eluded the regime. While Khomeini promised, "the entire system of government and administration, together with the necessary laws, lies ready for you.... Islam has established them all," once in power Islamists found many frustrations in their attempts to implement the sharia, complaining that there were "many questions, laws and operational regulations ... that received no mention in the shari'a." (Note: Ayatollah Behesti speaking in the Assembly of Experts in 1979,) Disputes within the Islamic Government compelled Khomeini himself to proclaim in January 1988 that the interests of the Islamic state outranked "all secondary ordinances" of Islam, even "prayer, fasting, and pilgrimage."

Other complaints

When a campaign started to install velayat-e faqih in the new Iranian constitution, critics complained that Khomeini had made no mention of velayat-e faqih "in the proclamations he issued during the revolution", that he had become the leader of the revolution promising to advise, rather than rule, the country after the Shah was overthrown, as late as 1978 while in Paris "he explicitly stated that rather than seeking or accepting any official government position, he would confine himself to the supervisory role of a guide in order to pursue the society's best interest", when in fact he had developed his theory of rule by jurists rather than by democratic elections, and spread it among his followers years before the revolution started; a complaint that some continue to make. The severe loss of prestige for the fuqaha (Islamic jurists) as a result of dissatisfaction with the application of clerical rule in Iran has been noted by many. "In the early 1980s, clerics were generally treated with elaborate courtesy. Nowadays [in 2002], clerics are sometimes insulted by schoolchildren and taxi drivers and they quite often put on normal clothes when venturing outside" the holy city of "Qom." According to journalist David Hirst, the Islamist government in Iran

has turned people in ever increasing numbers not only against the mullahs but also against Islam itself. The signs are everywhere, from the fall in attendance at religious schools to the way parents give pre-Islamic, Persian names to their children. If they are looking for authenticity, Iranians now chiefly find it in nationalism, not in religion.

As of early October 2022, "women and men, Persians and minorities, students and workers" in Iran are said to be "united ... against the mullahs' rule", to ”have made up their minds, ... they don't want reform, they want regime change".
