= Hamid Algar =

British-American Iranologist

Hamid Algar (born September 21, 1940) is a British-American Professor Emeritus of Persian studies at the Faculty of Near Eastern Studies, University of California, Berkeley. He writes on Islamic topics, Persian and Arabic literature and the history of Iran, Turkey, the Balkans and Afghanistan. He served on the UC Berkeley faculty for 45 years, 1965 to 2010. Algar remains an active scholar and his research has concentrated on the Islamic history of the Perso-Turkish world, with particular emphasis on Iranian Shi'ism during the past two centuries, and the Naqshbandi Sufi order.

Algar, who was born in England, first converted to Sunni Islam and later chose to follow Shia Islam. He has also translated books written by contemporary Shi'i theologians, like Ruhollah Khomeini's book Islamic Government (Velayat-e Faqih) and works by Ali Shariati, Morteza Motahhari, Mahmoud Taleqani and Mujtaba Musavi Lari.

== Life and career ==
After earning his B.A. with first-class honors in Oriental Languages (Arabic and Persian) at Trinity College, Cambridge in 1961, he was offered a scholarship to Tehran University in Iran, where he planned to work for his Ph.D. He audited courses in Persian literature and Iranian history at Tehran University during 1961-62 and Turkish literature and history at Istanbul University in 1962-63. He then returned to Cambridge and defended his thesis in 1965. Algar wrote his Ph.D. dissertation on the political role of Shi'i religious scholars in the 19th century. He traveled extensively in the Muslim world as a student, first visiting Iran in 1959 and many times thereafter. He is proficient in Arabic, Persian, Turkish, Bosnian, Malay, Russian, German and French. In addition to political and intellectual history, his eclectic interests include Central Asian hajj routes, consumption of tobacco and coffee, freemasonry, heterodox sects and bogus Sufis, on which he has published journal articles. He has written numerous entries for Encyclopædia Iranica.

"In an era of rapid cultural, intellectual, and political change, Algar's scholarship brought fresh perspectives to the study of Shiʿism, Sufism, and Islamic intellectual history, bridging worlds of language, thought, and spirituality and combining acute analyses of contemporary events with a respect for tradition" (A Luminous Intellect: Essays in Honor of Hamid Algar).

In 2009, fifty years after his first trip to Iran, he received the Farabi International Award in Islamic studies and an honorary doctorate from the University of Tehran's Faculty of Letters.

In regards to his conversion to Islam, Algar, who is of English lineage, has said, "I don't look like the average person's idea of a Muslim." Beyond academic activities, he participated in Muslim programs in local mosques and regularly delivered the sermons of Friday congregational prayers on the Berkeley campus.

== Views and scholarly critiques ==
Algar is described as "a seasoned scholar who knows his Islamic theology and modern Middle Eastern history". He was the only Western observer to predict the success of the opposition movement in Iran. During the Bosnian genocide of 1991-95, he spoke passionately in defense of civilians and the country's heritage. He has also been an outspoken advocate for Palestinian freedom for decades, earning worldwide respect for his stance while facing criticism within academia.

== Controversies ==
He has been criticized for his promotion of Khomeinism and admiration for Ayatollah Khomeini. In April 1998, during an on-campus commemoration of the Armenian genocide organized by the Armenian Students' Association, he allegedly said that Armenian genocide never happened and made other controversial remarks. A subsequent complaint prompted the university to carry out an investigation. In January 1999, the five-month-long investigation concluded and found that while Professor Algar's comments "seem to fall within the bounds of constitutionally protected speech", it did not mean that "the University condones the type of speech used by the parties." The Complaint Resolution Office did, however, issue an apology to the students on behalf of the university.

== Books ==
- Religion and State in Iran: 1785-1906 (University of California Press, 1969).
- Mirza Malkum Khan: A Biographical Study in Iranian Modernism (University of California Press, 1973).
- Roots of The Islamic Revolution in Iran (London: Open Press, 1983).
- Tasawwuf and Literature in Bosnia: Three Studies by Hamid Algar (tr. Muhammad Bukhari Lubis) (Shah Alam: Hizbi Sdn. Bhd., 1996).
- Jami: Makers of Islamic Civilization (Oxford University Press, 2013).
- Essays on Shi'ism and Iran (London: ICAS Press, 2021).
- A Luminous Intellect: Essays in Honor of Hamid Algar (Brill, 2025).

== Translations ==
- Islam and Revolution: Writings and Declarations of Imam Khomeini, translation and annotations (Berkeley: Mizan Press, 1981).
- The Path of God's Bondsmen from Origin to Return by Najm al-Din Razi, known as Daya, translator from the Persian with introduction and annotations (Delmar, NY: Caravan Books, 1982).
- An Anthology of Modern Arabic Poetry with Mounah A. Khouri (University of California Press, 1984).

== Booklets ==
- Surat Al-Fatiha: Foundation of the Qur'an
- Jesus in the Qur'an
- The Sunna: Its Obligatory and Exemplary Aspects
- Sufism: Principles and Practice
- Imam Abu Hamid Ghazali
- Wahhabism: A Critical Essay

== Articles and Chapters ==
- “The Revolt of Agha Khan Mahallati and the Transference of the Isma'ili Imamate to India, Studia Islamica, XXIX, 1969, pp. 43-69.
- “Malkum Khan, Akhundzada, and the Proposed Reform of the Arabic Alphabet,” Middle Eastern Studies, II, 1969, pp. 116-130.
- “An Introduction to the History of Freemasonry in Iran, Middle Eastern Studies, III, 1970, pp. 276-296.
- “The Oppositional Role of the 'Ulama in Twentieth Century Iran,” in N.R. Keddie, ed., Scholars, Saints and Sufis, Berkeley and Los Angeles: University of California Press, 1972, pp. 231-255.
- “Some Notes on the Naqshbandi Tariqat in Bosnia, Die Welt des Islams, XIII, 1972, pp. 168-203.
- “Shi’ism and Iran in the Eighteenth Century,” in Studies in Islamic History in the Eighteenth Century, eds. R. Owen and T. Naff, University of Southern Illinois Press, 1976, pp. 288-302.
- “The Naqshbandi Order: A Preliminary Survey of Its History and Significance,” Studia Islamica, XLIV, 1976, pp. 123-152.
- “Social Justice in the Ideology and Legislation of the Islamic Revolution of Iran,” in Social Legislation in the Contemporary Middle East, eds. L. Michalak and J.W. Salacuse. Berkeley: Institute of International Studies, University of California, 1986 pp. 17-60.
- “Imam Khomeini, 1902-1962: the Pre-Revolutionary Years,” in Ira Lapidus and Edmund Burke, eds. Islam, Politics, and Social Movements, Berkeley: University of California Press, 1988, pp. 263-288.
- “Imam Musa al-Kazim and Sufi Tradition,” Islamic Culture (Hyderabad, Deccan), LXIV:1, 1990, pp. 1-14.
- “Reflections of Ibn 'Arabi in Early Naqshbandi Tradition,” Journal of the Muhyiddin Ibn 'Arabi Society, X, 1991, pp. 1-20.
- “Religious Forces in Eighteenth- and Nineteenth-Century Iran,” in Cambridge History of Iran, VII: From Nadir Shah to the Islamic Republic, eds. Peter Avery, Gavin Hambley and Charles Melville. Cambridge University Press, 1991, pp. 705-731.
- “Religious Forces in Twentieth-Century Iran,” in Cambridge History of Iran, VII: From Nadir Shah to the Islamic Republic, eds. Peter Avery, Gavin Hambley and Charles Melville. Cambridge University Press, 1991, pp. 732-764.
- “The Problem of Retaliation in Modern Warfare from the Point of View of Fiqh,” in The Iran-Iraq War: The Politics of Aggression, ed. Farhang Rajaee. University Press of Florida, 1993, pp. 191-197.
- “Persian Literature in Bosnia-Herzegovina,” Journal of Islamic Studies (Oxford), V:2, 1994, pp. 254-267.
- “From Kashghar to Eyµp: The Lineages and Legacy of Seyh Abdullah Nidai,” in Naqshbandis in Western and Central Asia, Transactions of the Swedish Research Institute in Istanbul, ed. Elisabeth Özdalga, Vol. IX, 1999, pp. 1-15.
- “The Centennial Renewer: Bediuzzaman Said Nursi and the Tradition of Tajdid,” Journal of Islamic Studies (Oxford), XII:3, 2001, pp. 291-311.
- “Naqshbandis and Safavids: A Contribution to the Religious History of Iran and Her Neighbors,” in Safavid Iran and Her Neighbors, ed. Michel Mazzaoui. University of Utah Press, 2003 pp. 7-48.
- “The Fusion of the Gnostic and the Political in the Personality and Life of Imam Khomeini,” al-Tawhid (Qum), June 2003.
- “‘Allama Sayyid Muhammad Husayn Tabataba’i: Philosopher, Exegete and Gnostic,” Journal of Islamic Studies (Oxford), XVII:3, 2006, pp. 326-351.
- “The Naqshbandiyya-Khalidiyya in Talish,” Journal of History of Sufism, V 2007, pp. 169-197.
- “Bibliographical Notes on the Naqshbandiyya-Khalidiyya,” Journal of History of Sufism, V, 2007, pp. 13-19.
- “Sunni Claims to Imam Ja'far al-Sadiq,” in Fortresses of the Intellect: Ismaili and Other Islamic Studies in Honour of Farhad Daftary, ed. Omar Ali-de-Unzaga. London and New York: I.B. Tauris, 2011, pp. 77-101.
- “Tariqat and Tariq: Central Asian Naqshbandîs on the Roads to the Haramayn,” in Central Asian Pilgrims: Hajj Routes and Pious Visits between Central Asia and the Hijaz, eds. Alexandre Papas, Thomas Welsford and Thierry Zarcone. Berlin: Klaus Schwarz Verlag, 2012, pp. 21-135.
- “The Sufi Affiliations of Erzurumlu Ibrahim Hakki,” in Ötekilerin Pesinde: Ahmet Yasar Ocak’a Armagan, eds. Mehmet Öz and Fatih Yesil, Istanbul: Timas Yayinlari, 2015, pp. 665-690.
- “Impostors, Antinomians and Pseudo-Sufis: Cataloging the Miscreants,” in Journal of Islamic Studies (Oxford), XXIX:4, 2018, pp. 25-47.
- “Jami and the Ottomans,” in Jami in Regional Contexts: The Reception of ‘abd al-Rahman Jami's Works in the Islamicate World ca. 9th/15th-14th/20th Century, eds. Thibaut d’Hubert and Alexandre Papas. E.J. Brill, 2018, pp. 63-135.
