= Khums =

One-fifth tax in Islam

In Islam, khums (Arabic: خُمْس [xums]) is a tax on Muslims which obligates them to pay one-fifth (20%) of their acquired wealth from the spoils of war and, according to most Muslim jurists, other specified types of income, towards various designated beneficiaries. In Islamic legal terminology, "spoils of war" (al-ghanima) refers to property and wealth looted by the Muslim army after battling with non-Muslims or raiding them. Khums is the first Islamic tax, which was imposed in 2 AH/624 CE, (Note: In this article, dates are given according to the Islamic (Hijri) calendar first, followed by the equivalent dates in the Common Era calendar) after the Battle of Badr. It is separate from other Islamic taxes (Note: Other religiously required taxes in Islam include zakat, jizya, kharaj, and ushr.) such as zakat and jizya. It is treated differently in Sunni and Shia Islam; key topics of debate include the types of wealth subject to khums, the methods of its collection and distribution, and the categories of recipients (asnāf).

Historically, one-fifth of the spoils of war (i.e., the khums) was placed at the disposal of the Islamic prophet Muhammad who distributed it among himself, his close relatives, orphans, the needy and travelers (the remaining four-fifth of the spoils went to soldiers of the Muslim army who attacked the non-Muslims). After Muhammad's death, disagreement arose about how to use the share once given to Muhammad and whether to continue to give his close relatives a share of the khums. Over time, Sunni Muslims came to believe that khums should be paid to the ruler of the Islamic state for the general good of the Muslims, maintaining the Muslim army, and for distribution between the orphans, the needy, travelers, and, according to some jurists, the descendants of Muhammad. For the Shia, the khums must be paid to the Imam of the time, as the rightful heir of Muhammad, who then distributes it among the orphans, the needy, the travelers and other descendants of Muhammad. As Twelver Shi'is believe the Imam of the time is currently in Occultation (ghayba), they pay khums to senior religious scholars (mujtahids) of their choice, who are considered representatives of this Hidden Imam, and these jurists then divide the khums into two portions: one for distribution among the indigent descendants of Muhammad and the other for any activities that they believe will be agreeable to the Hidden Imam.

In Sunni Islam, jurists are unanimous in applying the khums to spoils of war but disagreement exists on whether this tax extends (at the rate of 20%) to buried treasure and products extracted from mines and the sea. In Shia Islam, khums is to be paid on the spoils of war, found treasure (al-kanz), mineral resources (al-maʼdin), objects obtained from the sea (al-ghawṣ), the profits of any income (arbāḥ al-mākasib), the lawful wealth (al-ḥalāl) which has become mixed with unlawful wealth (al-ḥarām), and the sale of land to a dhimmi.

== Origin ==
The Arabic term khums literally means "one-fifth." The institution of khums has its origins in pre-Islamic Arab custom, where the chief received one-fourth (mirbā') or one-fifth of the war booty along with the ṣafw al-māl (any part of the booty that particularly attracted him). The remaining booty was typically shared among the raiders who accompanied the chief, but the chief retained the right to dispose of the booty as he saw fit. Under Islam, the management and distribution of war booty became a state responsibility due to the large amounts of booty involved. The straightforward pre-Islamic Arab practice of division was inadequate for the more complex circumstances resulting from the Muslim conquests.

Muslim scholars agree that the khums was introduced in Islam when Quran 8:41 (called āyat al-khums or āyat al-ghanīma) was revealed:

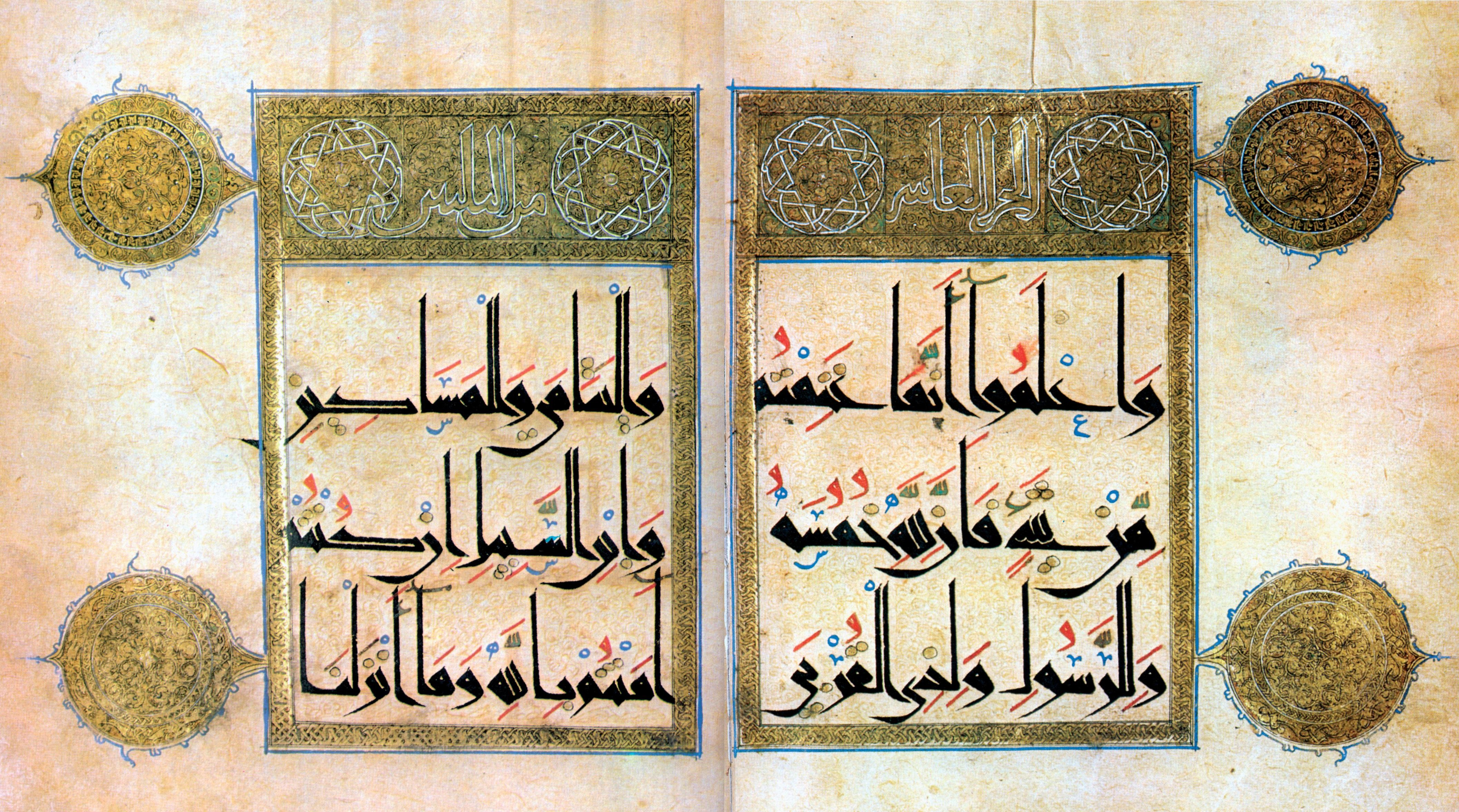
Arabic text of verse 8:41 of the Quran

And know ye that whatever of a thing ye acquire a fifth of it is for God and for the Apostle and for the (Apostle's) near relatives and the orphans and the needy and the wayfarer, if ye believe in God and that which we sent down...

Regarding the circumstances of its revelation, there is disagreement between exegetes. One account mentions that Abd Allah b. Jahsh independently designated one-fifth of the spoils taken from raiding the Quraysh at Nakhla — the first spoils obtained under Islam — for Muhammad shortly before the Battle of Badr (2 AH/624 CE), and this practice was later confirmed by the Quran. Other sources suggest that khums was introduced at various times, including during Badr itself, after the victories over Banu al-Nadir (4/625) or Banu Qurayza (5/627), during the conquest of Khaybar (7/628), or even as late as the Battle of Hunayn (8/630). However, it is generally believed that Quran 8:41 abrogated Quran 8:1 (called āyat al-anfāl, which had allowed Muhammad to distribute the spoils from the Battle of Badr as he deemed appropriate). Thus, Quran 8:41 is thought to have been revealed sometime after Badr, with some sources indicating that the rule of khums was first applied to the booty acquired from the victory over the Jewish tribe of Banu Qaynuqa (2/624). Hence khums is considered the first Islamic tax, imposed after the Battle of Badr, two years after the Hijra.

== During Muhammad's lifetime ==
Muhammad taught paying khums as a fundamental religious duty. (Note: Khums is mentioned in Sahih Hadith. According to Sahih al-Bukhari, when the delegates of the tribe of Abd al-Qays met Muhammad and asked him for some advice, he told them to pay "Khums (i.e. one-fifth) of the war booty to Allah". (Note: Sahih al-Bukhari 3095)) Two people who collected khums for Muhammad are identified as Mahmiya b. Jaz' and Abd Allah b. Ka'b al-Ansari. Ali b. Abi Talib was appointed by Muhammad to distribute the portion of khums allocated to his near relatives.

Muhammad received one-fifth of the bounty allocated to him in God's name, alongside two additional categories of shares from the booty: the ṣafw al-māl (the select item that Muhammad chose for himself before the booty was distributed) and his share as a participant in the battle alongside other warriors. The remaining four-fifths of the booty was to be distributed among the troops who accompanied the Prophet.

== After Muhammad's death ==
Shortly after the death of Muhammad in 11 AH/632 CE, the allocation of khums to the various groups mentioned in Quran 8:41 became a source of disagreement. The main issue revolved around how to treat the first three groups specified in the verse—God, the Prophet, and his family—with particular contention regarding the latter two. Muhammad's successor and the first caliph Abu Bakr (r. 632–34) reportedly sought the opinions of the Muslims regarding the shares belonging to Muhammad and his family, receiving a variety of perspectives on the matter. Some advised him to redistribute these shares among the other recipients, while others argued that they should be allocated for preparations for war, such as acquiring horses and weapons. Abu Bakr removed the entitlement of Muhammad's family to the khums and allocated it to the clans of the Quraysh, thereby strengthening their support for his caliphate. Umar (r. 634–44) proposed using the khums to cover marriage expenses and debts for the unmarried members of the Muhammad's family. When Muhammad's closest relatives demanded their entire share, Umar refused their request.

During the caliphates of Uthman (r. 644–56) and Ali (r. 656–61), the practice of dividing the khums into three parts—one for orphans, one for the poor, and one for travelers—became well-established. As a relative of Muhammad, Ali was inquired about the family's share and noted that while they had been compensated until the conquests of Susa and Ahwaz, their share was discontinued thereafter.

Another account states that Ali once asked Muhammad to establish a law ensuring the continuation of his family's share after his death, which was enacted. This arrangement reportedly lasted until the final days of Umar, who ended the allocation of the share to the Prophet's family when revenues increased. There were subsequent concerns about Ali potentially making a similar decision.

== Sunni jurisprudence ==
Sunni exegetes interpret Quran 8:41 as specifically referring to war booty; however, there is considerable disagreement among them regarding the circumstances of its revelation, its interpretation, and how applicable it is after Muhammad's death.

=== Applicability ===
Jurists of the four Sunni schools of law—Hanafi, Hanbali, Maliki and Shafi'i—have differing views about the things khums is applicable on. In its original form, khums was applied at the rate of 20% to spoils of war. Over time, this tax was expanded to include treasure, mines, and all materials extracted from the sea or earth. Today, Sunni jurisprudence holds that khums is applicable only to excavated items from land, sea, mines, buried treasures, and spoils of war, at the rate of 20%. In this context, khums functions both as a “windfall tax” and as a tax on specific natural resources.

==== Spoils of war or booty (ghanima) ====
Jurists of all schools agree about the rules governing khums applying to ghanima, which is interpreted as the spoils of war or booty acquired through armed conflict. However, the Shafi'is and some Hanbalis, particularly al-Khiraqi (d. 334/945), extend the application of khums to fayʾ, which is property given up by non-Muslims without resort to war, for example, as a result of negotiations or a treaty. The Malikis identify an intermediate category, al-mukhtaṣṣ, which includes property looted stealthily from the non-Muslim territory, and stipulate that the khums from this property must be privately distributed by the individual who seized it. There is ongoing debate regarding the obligation of khums on property taken by small groups of raiders acting independently.

Food consumed by combatants or their animals does not count as booty subject to division. During Muhammad's lifetime, items he selected as personal prizes (ṣafī) were also not counted as booty subject to division. Khums is calculated on the total booty after deducting expenses like transport and safekeeping. According to the Hanbalis and Shafi'is, deductions also include the clothing, weapons, mounts, and other personal items (salab) of opponent soldiers claimed by the specific Muslim soldiers who have killed or disabled them. The Hanafis and Malikis treat claims to these personal items as "rewards" (anfāl; sing. nafal), (Note: In the terminology of Sunni Muslim jurists, ghanīma is distributed among all warriors but anfāl are awarded to those who excelled in battle. In this context, anfāl represent bonus shares that the ruler grants to certain warriors in addition to their standard portion of the booty. This promise of anfāl was made in advance to boost morale and enhance the fighting spirit of the army, thereby forming part of the ruler's military strategy. This practice of providing bonus shares is referred to as tanfīl.) requiring an express grant from the ruler. The Hanafis provide rewards from the khums if the grant is made after the booty is secured in Islamic territory (iḥrāz); otherwise, it comes from the four-fifths of the booty. The Hanbalis also draw rewards from the four-fifths. The Malikis provide rewards from khums in all cases and the Shafi'is provide rewards from the one-fourth share of the khums designated for community needs.

The rules for khums apply first and foremost to movable property: prisoners of war (including combatants, women and children) are enslaved and included in the booty to be divided. The captured slaves of the non-Muslims are also included in the booty to be divided. There is disagreement regarding real property: the Shafi'is divide it among the Muslim combatants and subject it to khums, while the Malikis do not. The Hanafis and Hanbalis leave the division to the ruler's discretion. When dividing the booty itself, rather than its sale price, the determination of khums is made by lot, with specific designations for khums (i.e., li'llāh, li'l-maṣāliḥ, li-rasūl Allāh).

There is debate regarding how much a ruler can bypass the general rules for dividing booty, including khums, by stating that each combatant may keep what they take as a reward. Many Hanafis argue that booty obtained under such a general offer of reward (tanfīl ʻāmm) is not subject to khums provided it is obtained by a detachment (sariyya), rather than the whole army, that is sent from within enemy territory.

==== Treasure ====
The Hanafis, Hanbalis and Malikis view the one-fifth due on the discovery of pre-Islamic treasure, as enjoined by hadith, as analogous to the one-fifth from booty (khums). The Shafi'is limit this obligation to gold and silver, applying the same minimum amount (niṣāb) as zakat on those metals. While the Hanafis distribute this one-fifth similarly to the khums from booty, the Hanbalis and Malikis classify it as fayʾ to be used for community needs, whereas the Shafi'is treat it as zakat.

==== Mining products (maʻdin) ====
The Hanafis and some Malikis also extend the one-fifth rule to mining products, such as malleable metals according to the Hanafis and nearly pure pieces gold and silver (nadra) according to the Malikis.

==== Sea products ====
Opinions from some early scholars suggested that a one-fifth share was also due on pearls, ambergris, and other sea products, including fish, but these views were not widely followed.

=== Division and distribution ===
The common Sunni view is that during Muhammad's lifetime, khums was divided into five shares, with Muhammad receiving a share allocated "for God and the Prophet" (referred to as khums al-khums). This share was used by Muhammad to support himself and his immediate family and the other shares were directed toward his kin and community needs. A minority, including the Basran Quran scholar Abu al-'Aliya Rufay b. Mihran al-Riyahi (d. 90/708 or 96/714) and, as reported occasionally, his mentor Ibn Abbas (d. 68/687-8), argued that a separate sixth share designated for God existed which was meant for the maintenance of the Kaaba. Muqatil b. Sulayman (d. 150/767) stated that khums was divided into four parts, with one part representing the shares of God, Muhammad, and Muhammad's family.

The Shafi'is and Hanbalis continue to divide khums into five shares following Muhammad's death: (1) the share of God and the Prophet (previously given to Muhammad), which now supports the needs of the Muslim community (sahm al-maṣālih), (2) the share for the Prophet's relatives (dhu'l-qurba), given to the members of the Banu Hashim (Muhammad's clan) and the Banu Muttalib clans (Note: The Banu Hashim and Banu Muttalib clans were descendants of Abd Manaf through his two eponymous sons, Hashim and Muttalib.) regardless of their needs, with males receiving twice the share of females, (3) orphans (yatāmā), defined as needy minors without a father, (4) the poor (masākīn), corresponding to the "poor and needy" in Quran 9:60, and (5) travelers, defined similarly as for zakat. Al-Shafi'i (d. 204/820; the eponymous founder of the Shafi'i school of Sunni Islam) was from the Banu Hashim and extensively argued for the share of the nearest relatives, contending that it should be granted because the ghanima had increased—referring to Umar's denial of this share. He maintained that no Muslim has the right to deny the portion designated for them by Qur'anic command.

The Hanafi stance is that after Muhammad's death, his share and that of his family ceased to exist. Hanafis support this stance with the practice of the first four caliphs (Abu Bakr, Umar, Uthman and Ali) as evidence. They teach that khums should be divided only among only three of the five categories mentioned in Surah 8:41, namely the orphans, the needy, and travelers. However, they do give priority to needy members of Muhammad's family within these three categories, as his family members are religiously forbidden to receive alms like zakat. The Hanafi stance is likely a later developed view as Abu Yusuf (d. 182/798) reported that Hanafi jurists of his time believed khums should be divided into three shares: one for Muhammad (to be passed to the caliph after his death), another for Muhammad's family, and a third for orphans, the poor, and wayfarers. Abu Yusuf, a disciple of Abu Hanifa (d. 150/768), the founder of the Hanafi school of Sunni Islam, attributed to him the view that the shares of Muhammad and his family should be used for amassing troops and weapons instead, in line with the practices of the first two caliphs (Abu Bakr and Umar) who succeeded Muhammad. However, another disciple of Abu Hanifa, al-Shaybani (d. 189/802), attributed to him the view that khums should be divided into three parts: one for the poor, one for orphans, and one for travelers. al-Baydawi (d. 1316) reported that Abu Hanifa held that the shares for the Prophet and his family ceased to exist after his death. These varying opinions among jurists within a single school reveal the confusion in the sources used to determine the distribution of khums and also the complexities arising from the extensive expansion of the Islamic empire.

The Malikis view the categories mentioned in Quran 8:41 as illustrative and consider the entire khums as fayʾ, to be allocated for the needs of Muslims at the discretion of the ruler, a position also supported by the Hanbali jurist Ibn Taymiyya (d. 652/1254). For instance, the ruler could choose to divide it evenly between the poor and the rich. Additionally, Malik (d. 179/795), founder of the Maliki school of Sunni Islam, asserted that the ruler could, if he wished, allocate part of the khums to Muhammad's family. The Malikis also recommend that the distribution of khums should start with grants to members of the Banu Hashim.

Special allocations (raḍkh) of booty for slaves, women, and children participating in battle, who do not qualify as combatants, are distributed differently: according to the Hanafis from the total booty, according to the Shafi'is and Hanbalis from the four-fifths left after taking out the khums, and according to the Malikis from khums itself, although they generally disapprove of such allocations.

Most later Muslim jurists agreed that the portion of the khums designated for Muhammad should be spent, among other things, to maintain the Muslim army and for the general good of the Muslims. These jurists also concurred that a portion of the khums should go to the "near relatives" of Muhammad, but they disagreed on who these rightful near relatives were, with some considering them to be the Banu Hashim only, and others including the Banu Muttalib with them.

== Twelver Shia jurisprudence ==
Paying khums is of great importance in Twelver Shi'ism. and is one of the practices that are considered the obligatory acts of faith (furūʻ al-dīn). The discussion of khums is a vital component of all Twelver works of jurisprudence and constitutes one of the basic differences between the Twelver school and other Islamic legal schools. Historically, the fifth Imam Muhammad al-Baqir (d. 114/732) refused to accept religious funds. In contrast, the sixth Imam Ja'far al-Sadiq (d. 148/765) occasionally accepted zakat, voluntary donations (nadhr), endowments (waqf), and gifts from his followers. However, both Imams Muhammad al-Baqir and Ja'far al-Sadiq did not impose khums on their followers. There was a widespread belief in their time that this tax would be established by the Qa'im when he came to implement his rule of justice in the future.

There are some reports that the seventh Imam Musa al-Kadhim (d. 183/799-800) received khums from his followers and that the eighth Imam Ali al-Rida (d. 203/818) instructed his followers to pay this tax. (Note: It is narrated in Kitab al-Kafi that Imam Musa al-Kadhim would accept one dirham from the people, although he was one of the wealthiest in the city of Medina, to purify them. He compares this to Allah asking His creatures to lend to Him from their property, not because He is need, but rather it is His right as appointed guardian over His creatures.) The systematic collection of khums as a mandatory tax seems to have started in 220/835 when the ninth Imam Muhammad al-Jawad (d. 220/835), through a document, directed his financial representatives to collect khums on specific types of income. The document from Muhammad al-Jawad attests to the fact that the tax was not systematically collected before the date mentioned. Historical accounts indicate that the practice of collecting this tax through local representatives of the Imam became well-established during the latter part of the tenure of the tenth Imam Ali al-Hadi (d. 254/868). The revenues of the office of the Imamate increased significantly with the introduction of the khums tax, which the Imam's agents collected from the faithful, under the justification that such was his right. Since this tax was still a new imposition, questions arose regarding the extent of this "right." Three key representatives of Ali al-Hadi informed him that they had encountered questions from the Shia community about the right of the Imam that the representatives had been unable to answer.

The revenue from khums appears to have been a significant source of income for the Imams, who, according to Islamic law, were not permitted to receive alms (sadaqāt; sing. sadaqa). This income also highlighted their strength and that of their followers. In some instances, the Imams' wealth became a source of envy for the caliphs, who noted the "flow of wealth from east and west" to the Imams. For instance, the Abbasid caliph Harun al-Rashid (d. 193/809) learned about the khums received by the seventh Imam, Musa al-Kadhim, in Medina. According to Abu al-Faraj al-Isfahani, this was one of the reasons that led to the imprisonment of this Imam by the caliph.

=== Applicability ===
For the Shia, the main Quranic reference for khums is verse 8:41 of the Quran. While Sunni exegetes consider Quran 8:41 to relate to war booty (ghanīma), Twelver and Zaydi scholars consider the phrase "whatever of a thing you acquire" (annamā ghanimtum min shayʼin) in the verse to refer to wealth more generally. In the Twelver tradition, various akhbār (reports or sayings of the Imams) substantiate the definition of ghanima this way, such as the saying of the eighth Imam Ali al-Rida: "Everything from which the people gain benefit is ghanima." Additionally, several akhbar assert the Imam's original ownership of the world and its resources, exemplified by the claim, "All the earth is ours, and what God produces from it is also ours." (Note: al-Kulayni (d. 328/940), Kitab al-Kafi, Tehran 1388/1968, vol. 1, p. 408) Consequently, khums is viewed as analogous to a tenant's obligation to pay a fixed percentage of the harvest to the landowner.

As early as the fourth century AH/tenth century CE, Muhammad b. Ya’qub al-Kulayni (d. 328/940-41) compiled the main traditions regarding what belongs to the Imam, laying the groundwork for the subsequent development of khums within Twelver Shi’ism. In his Kitab al-Kafi, al-Kulayni offered a summary of the earliest understanding of khums in Twelver teachings. Although Twelver jurists (fuqahāʾ) have varied in their interpretations of al-Kulayni's summary over time, his explanation is generally regarded as the foundational understanding of the concept of khums:

"Indeed God, the Praised, the Exalted, gave the whole world, in its entirety, to His vicegerent, just as He said [in the Qur'an] unto the angels: "Verily, I (intend to) appoint a vicegerent (khalifa) [i.e., Adam] in the earth [2:30]." Thus the entire world belonged to Adam and was passed on to his righteous children and successors after him. Hence, whatever their enemies seize from them by fighting or victory and then returns to them is named fayʾ. Fayʾ is that which is made to return to them [either] by victory or by fighting. The injunction concerning fayʾ is what God, the Exalted, has said [in the Qur'an]: "And know ye that whatever of a thing ye acquire, a fifth of it is for God, and for the Apostle and for the (Apostle's) near relatives and the orphans and needy and the wayfarer [Qur'an 8:41]." Thus it belongs to God, the Prophet, and the Prophet's kindred. This then is al-fayʾ, [that is,] "that which was made to return" (al-rājiʻ). And "that which was made to return" is what had fallen into the hands of others. Therefore, it was taken from them by the use of force (lit. by sword). But as for that which came back to them without being troubled with horses and troops, these are anfal, and they belong exclusively to the Prophet. No one has a share in them; shares are made in the thing for which a battle was fought. [This is the case] in the ghanā'im [of which] four portions are assigned to those who fight and one portion to the Prophet. That [portion] which belongs to the Prophet, he divides into six portions of which three are for himself and the other three are divided among the orphans, the needy, and the wayfarers. But in the case of al-anfal, this is not the way prescribed [for its allocation], since it belongs to the Prophet exclusively. Fadak belonged to the Prophet alone, since he and Amir al-Mu'minin [Ali] had captured it and there was nobody else with them. Consequently, the name al-fayʾ ceases to be applied to it, and it necessarily comes under al-anfal. Similarly, jungles, mines, oceans, and deserts belong to the imam, in particular. Thus, if a group of people cultivate [a piece of land] with the permission of the imam, then four fifths belong to them and one fifth goes to the imam. That one [portion] assigned to the imam follows the same procedure [in its distribution] as al-khums. But if they cultivate it without the permission of the imam, then the imam takes it all, and no one has a share in it. Likewise, those who build something or cause water to flow in a canal or cultivate a dead land without the permission of the landowner (ṣāḥib al-arḍ), then it does not belong to them. [The imam], if he wishes, may take it all away from them or may leave it in their hands." (Note: al-Kulayni, al-Kafi, Tehran 1392, vol. 2; pp. 626-28.)

According to this understanding, everything on earth is the exclusive property of the Imam, and only the believers, specifically the Shia, are allowed to use this property. They are entitled to four-fifths of the usufruct for their labor, while the remaining one-fifth belongs to the Imam. The anfal encompasses anything obtained without conflict, such as crown lands (qata'i al-muluk), sawafi (lands allocated to rulers), abandoned lands, and heritable land with no heirs, including woods, forests, and mines, as well as all that is found in the seas and on the ocean floor. The Shia could occupy the Imam's property only with his permission; all others were deemed usurpers who had unlawfully taken the anfal and would be expelled by the Qa'im, the Mahdi of the Twelvers, upon his return.

In another tradition referenced by al-Kulayni, a Shi’i from al-Bahrayn named Misma’ Abu Sayyar presented the Imam with 80,000 dirhams, indicating that this amount was one-fifth of his earnings from diving for pearls in al-Bahrayn, done in accordance with God's command regarding the Imam's rights. The Imam responded, "Is it only one-fifth of what God brings forth from the earth that belongs to us? O Abu Sayyar, all the earth is ours, and everything God produces from it belongs to us." Misma’ then offered to bring the entire amount, to which the Imam replied, "O Abu Sayyar, we have purified it for you and made it lawful; take it and add it to your possessions. All that the earth holds in the hands of our Shia is lawful for them until the Qa'im appears, who will collect what is due from them while leaving the earth in their possession. However, for those who are not followers of the Imams, what they acquire from the earth is unlawful until our Qa'im returns, at which point he will reclaim the earth from them and expel them empty-handed."

Twelver jurists assert that the term ghanima encompasses a broader definition than just the booty from battles with non-Muslims and that it also includes various forms of gains and profits generated through trade and business. This distinction is a fundamental difference between the Twelver school and other schools of fiqh. Given that verse 8:41 appears within a discourse on war, exegetical efforts were made to reinforce the interpretation that khums applied on any income, not just spoils of war. Such efforts typically began with a grammatical analysis of the term ghanima and the related verb, as discussed by al-Shaykh al-Tusi (d. 460/1067), where the verb is defined as "acquiring something for profitable use." al-Tusi (d. 1067), in his discussion of ghanima, explained that the term is derived from the root gh-n-m, which refers to anything acquired with the intention of making a profit, whether through capital or not. Hence, according to the jurists, al-ghanima refers to anything that becomes profitable without requiring capital. Based on this understanding, ghanima can be categorized into two types: first, what is taken from dār al-ḥarb (abode of war) through fighting, subjugation, or victory; and second, what is obtained by other means, such as treasures, mines, or diving for pearls, as well as surplus income. Regarding spoils of war taken from dar al-harb, a one-fifth share must be extracted from it, regardless of whether it can be transferred to Islamic territory. The interpretation that khums applied on more than just spoils of war was further supported by additional akhbār (sayings of the Imams; sing. khabar) such as: "A fifth of the earth is ours, and a fifth of all things is ours."

The items subject to khums have been specified in various collections of akhbar as well as in works of jurisprudence. The earliest classification of taxable wealth included six categories: spoils of war, products from the sea, buried treasure, minerals, and malāhā. The term malāhā was interpreted through juristic reasoning and references to other akhbar, as profits from trade, agriculture, and crafts, as well as from land owned by a dhimmi (i.e., a free non-Muslim in Islamic territory) that is acquired by a Muslim and "halal wealth mixed with haram wealth." This led to a total of seven categories. Once these categories were established, they remained notably consistent in later traditions. al-Tusi's al-Mabsut and al-Tahdhib, along with his al-Nihaya, encapsulate the Twelver stance on this matter. Later Twelver works on jurisprudence contribute very little beyond what earlier authorities like al-Tusi provided regarding khums, although some of them do introduce new interpretations on certain key issues related to its distribution.

==== Contemporary view on applicability ====
Khums is calculated on the following seven items after deducting one year's provisions:

1. Booty seized during a raid or the spoils of war (al-ghanīma)
2. The profit of income, regardless of the trade or business it is from (arbāḥ al-mākasib)
3. The legitimately earned wealth (al-ḥalāl) which has become mixed with illegitimate wealth (al-ḥarām). Wealth is considered “mixed” when the owner is unable to distinguish the amount or items which he has acquired by lawful means from those which have come to his possession by “unlawful” means (i.e., any means not permitted in Islamic law, such as gambling, usury, the liquor business, etc.)
4. Mines and mineral resources extracted (al-maʻadan)
5. Objects obtained from the sea (al-ghawṣ)
6. Treasure found (al-kanz)
7. The land sold by a Muslim to a dhimmi (a free non-Muslim who is subject to a treaty of surrender in the Islamic state).

Khums is a 20% tax on the aforementioned wealth, after deductions for expenses of the individual and dependents. It becomes obligatory (wajib) to pay khums at the beginning of the new financial year on the profit or surplus of the past year's income. The "beginning" of the new financial year means the time when the profit or surplus of the income of the past year becomes clear. According to most contemporary jurists, it is precautionarily obligatory to pay khums on any prizes, gifts, bequests (items received through the will of a friend or someone unrelated), alms, zakat, and khums received. However, khums is not required on dowry or inheritance, except in cases where one inherits from an unlikely source, such as a distant relative from whom inheritance is not anticipated.

The Shi’i conception of khums has been described as an in-kind tax or a type of income tax. It can be paid either in kind or as an equivalent amount of money, which must reflect the fair market value of the taxable item. Unlike zakat, which applies as long as the holdings exceed the required nisab, khums is a one-time tax - once khums is paid on an item, that item is permanently exempt from any future khums.

=== Division and distribution ===
When the Imam is present, he is responsible for receiving and distributing khums, although he may appoint a representative for this task. In the Twelver legal system, khums was divided into six portions: one each for God, Muhammad, Muhammad's family, orphans, the needy, and travelers. The Twelvers argue that the division of khums into six portions aligns with the direct interpretation of Quran 8:41.

Al-Shaykh al-Tusi explained that according to one view, God's share was allocated to Muhammad, who could use it in the service of God. After Muhammad's death, his share is given to his closest relatives, in addition to the specific portion designated for his family. The share for orphans was assigned to the orphans of the Muhammad's family (i.e., Banu Hashim), while the remaining two shares were distributed to the poor and travellers as alms (sadaqa), thereby excluding the Muhammad's family from these portions. However, this view was not widely accepted.

According to another view noted by al-Tusi, the portions designated for God and Muhammad are considered the property of the Imam. The share for Muhammad's family also goes to the Imam, who is responsible for distributing it among the family members. The remaining three shares are allocated to the orphans, the needy, and travelers in the general population, not just the Banu Hashim. Ibn Hamza (who lived in 566/1170) supported this position.

However, according to the majority of Twelver jurists as noted by al-Tusi, the shares allocated for God and Muhammad are designated for Muhammad's successor, his wali al-amr (the executor of his will). Therefore, the Imam receives three shares: two as the rightful heir of Muhammad and one assigned to him by God. The other three shares are distributed to orphans, the poor, and travellers from the Banu Hashim only. A minority also contended that the descendants of Hashim's brother, Muttalib, should be included among Muhammad's family, similar to how the descendants of both Hasan and Husayn hold sayyid status. However, this view did not gain significant influence. al-Kulayni narrated a tradition from Sulaym b. Qays al-Hilali, who heard Ali state that the “family of the Prophet” (dhawi al-qurba) mentioned in Quran 8:41 refers specifically to the Banu Hashim, and that "the orphans and the needy" are exclusively among them, as they cannot have a share in alms (sadaqa) in Islam. The juristic reasoning for the majority position, later summarized by Muhammad Hasan al-Najafi (d. 1266/1850), is as follows: God's share was initially owned by Muhammad, who had the authority to manage it as he wished. After Muhammad's death, both shares (of God and Muhammad) were inherited by the Imam. The share for "near relatives" also goes to the Imam, as they became the heads of the Ahl al-Bayt following Muhammad's death. Thus, when the Imam is present, he is entitled to half of the khums, with the remaining shares distributed by him. As the shares intended for Muhammad's family must be managed by the Imam for the benefit of his descendants and the remaining three portions of khums should also be exclusively for the Banu Hashim, meaning they must also be administered by the Imam. This necessitates the continuous presence of the Imam to oversee the administration of khums. In the absence of the Imam, as is the case with the Twelfth Imam during the period of Occultation (ghayba) that began in 260/874, questions arose regarding the management of khums and whether it is still obligatory during this time. This leads to the question of who is empowered to lead the Twelvers until the return of the Twelfth Imam, a contentious issue of Twelver authority during the period of the Occultation.

==== Khums during the Occultation ====
The Imam's absence during the Occultation (260/874-present) allowed Twelver jurists to link the topic of khums payment to the contentious matter of community leadership during the absence of the Twelfth Imam. Twelver jurists held differing views regarding the handling of khums. al-Tusi (d. 460/1067), the most prominent Shi’i legal scholar of the early Middle Ages, summarizes these opinions in his book al-Mabsut. (Note: His viewpoint aligns with that of the earlier Twelver jurists, known as the "ancient" (mutaqaddimiin), who wrote prior to 680/1281-82, which marks the end of al-Muhaqqiq al-Awwal, the last of the “early” Imami jurists.The current line of "modern" (muta'akhkhirīn) Imami jurists begins with Ibn al-Mutahhar al-Hilli (d. 1326), and extends to the present day.) According to al-Tusi, Twelver jurists had four distinct opinions regarding what to do with khums, particularly concerning the three shares of the Imam, during the Occultation. al-Tusi added that there is no specific stipulation (naṣṣ mu'ayyan) in the sources regarding this matter:

1. The first opinion holds that during the Occultation, khums is permissible for the Shia under certain conditions, and they are not required to pay it until the Imam reappears. Consequently, the Shia may freely use the Imam's property, as it has been made lawful for them. In other words, khums was considered lapsed (sāqiṭ) because the Imam could not collect it personally, a perspective associated with Salar al-Daylami (d. 463/1071). However, al-Tusi disagreed with this view, arguing that it contradicts the principle of precaution, which dictates that individuals should not act without restrictions when it comes to disposing of others' property. (Note: Among the "modern" jurists, Muhsin al-Hakim, who authored a notable work on demonstrative fiqh, asserted that this opinion relies on a "rare" report that is contradicted by other "authentic" traditions. The report in question, cited by al-Kulayni, claims that the Twelfth Imam wrote to one of his followers regarding khums, stating, "It is lawful for our followers (Shia), and they are exempt from paying it until our authority prevails, so that their children may be born in righteousness and not in sin." al-Hakim argued that the owner's permission is necessary for something to be deemed lawful, and when such permission is not possible—as in the case of the Twelfth Imam—permission must be sought from his representatives, such as the mujtahids.)
2. The second opinion asserts that one must retain the khums for their entire life, and as death approaches, they should make a will (wasiyya) to a trusted fellow believer to ensure it is handed over to the Imam upon his reappearance. If this individual dies before seeing the Imam, they should similarly bequeath it to another reliable person until the goods can reach the Imam. al-Tusi did not object to this view. (Note: al-Hakim, however, countered this opinion, stating that there are two main concerns: first, the risk of the Imam's property being lost or destroyed; and second, retaining the goods would only be appropriate if the Imam's wishes regarding their disposal were unknown. Since the guidelines for distributing khums are well established by precedent, it is unnecessary to indefinitely hold onto it through successive wills.) Some jurists, such as Ibn Idris al-Hilli (d. 598/1202), argued that the will option applied only to the Imam's share (i.e., one half of the khums), while the remaining three shares could be distributed by individuals themselves. Ibn Idris maintained that the Imam's share should be preserved until his return, although this idea was not further developed.
3. The third view holds that khums should be buried, as the earth will yield its treasures when the Mahdi returns. This practice was linked to Ibn Barraj al-Tarabulusi (d. 481/1099). al-Tusi did not oppose this method. (Note: However, al-Hakim raises two objections to this perspective: first, there is a significant risk of the buried goods being lost or destroyed; second, the tradition cited in support of this view is not considered authentic, and therefore cannot be used to establish a legal precedent.)
4. The fourth view related by al-Tusi states that khums should be divided into six portions. The three shares designated for the Imam should either be buried or entrusted to a reliable person. The remaining three portions should be distributed among the Banu Hashim, specifically their orphans, the poor, and wayfarers. Proponents of this opinion argue that this is the appropriate course of action because the eligible recipients are present, and since the Imam, who would normally oversee the distribution, is not currently visible, it is treated similarly to zakat and thus lawful to distribute. al-Tusi appeared to support this arrangement, as he does not raise any objections to it. (Note: However, al-Hakim adds a supplementary opinion, suggesting that the Imam's three shares should be combined with the other three and distributed among the Banu Hashim. Al-Hakim objects to this by stating that there is no precedent for such an action, and the sources do not indicate that the Imam increased the shares allocated to the other three categories from his own portion.)

Muhsin al-Hakim (d. 1390/1970) discussed additional opinions beyond those previously mentioned, reflecting the legal rulings of both "ancient" and "modern" Imami jurists. Many of these rulings present alternative combinations of the four opinions outlined by al-Tusi. Some of these views can be considered "radical" and have not garnered support among the mujtahids, although they are appealing to the Shia masses. For example, Ibn Hamza Muhammad b. Ali al-Tusi (d. sixth/twelfth century), the author of an early work on Imami fiqh titled al-Wasila fi al-fiqh, argued that khums should be allocated to all needy Shia, irrespective of whether they are sayyids, based on numerous authentic traditions from the Imams asserting that the needs of all impoverished individuals fall under their responsibility. al-Hakim responded that Ibn Hamza's stance is only valid when the Imam is present, as he alone has the authority to make such decisions regarding the inclusion of all Shia in the typically restricted distribution of khums.

Muhaqqiq al-Hilli (d. 676/1277) stated that the Imam had granted the Shia permission (idhn) to utilize his property generally, including khums, during his absence, which did not constitute unauthorized use. He asserted that khums should be distributed by "the one who possesses authority through delegation" (niyāba). al-Mutahhar al-Hilli (d. 726/1325) identified this authority as belonging to al-hākim, referring to a member of the jurists. Over time, these terminological distinctions became more refined, reaching a conclusion with the Safavid jurist Muhammad Baqir al-Sabziwari (d. 1090/1679), who argued that khums should be given to "worthy recipients through the auspices of the just jurist qualified to issue fatwas," meaning that mujtahids should receive and distribute khums. This position remains prevalent today.

al-Hakim's perspective on khums in the absence of the Imam was that even though the Imam is in occultation, it is possible to discern how he would want khums to be administered. Therefore, al-Hakim maintained that a qualified mujtahid in religious sciences could serve as the Imam's representative (wakīl, nā'ib) and collect khums on his behalf. This representative must be the most knowledgeable (al-a'lam) and righteous (al-'adil) jurist, ensuring that khums is used appropriately according to the Imam's wishes during the occultation. Once the mujtahid receives the khums, he is to divide it into two parts: sahm al-Imam and sahm al-sadat. The first portion, which includes the shares for God, the Prophet, and the Imam, should be used for promoting the faith and similar activities. al-Hakim argued that the administration of sahm al-Imam rightly belongs to someone well-versed in matters of the faith, making the mujtahid responsible for fulfilling the Imam's intentions. The second portion, sahm al-sadat, is to be distributed exclusively among the Banu Hashim. al-Hakim's suggestion reflects practices from the early days of Twelver history during the Minor Occultation of the Twelfth Imam (873–941), when the Imam's representatives collected khums in his absence. This practice evolved into a well-organized institution, particularly from the late Safavid period onward. al-Hakim's opinion is now the standard view among contemporary Twelver mujtahids, who continue to adhere to this division of khums. Clearly, the revenue from khums remains a significant source of power and prestige for the mujtahids as indirect representatives of the Hidden Imam.

==== Contemporary view on division and distribution ====
The Shi’i clergy take the six categories of potential recipients mentioned in the Quran 8:41 literally, declaring that each of them is entitled to one-sixth of the khums:

1. Allah
2. Muhammad
3. the near relatives of Muhammad
4. orphans
5. the needy
6. stranded travelers.

Shi’is believe that since Allah does not personally collect his share of khums, Muhammad, as Allah's representative on earth, received both his own share and that of Allah. After his death, the shares of Allah and the Prophet are entrusted to his rightful successor, the Imam of the time. Thus the first three categories— Allah, Muhammad and his near relatives—are combined and, accordingly, three-sixths of the khums are due the Twelfth Imam Muhammad al-Mahdi. This portion is referred to as the “Imam’s share” (Arabic: sahm al-Imām; Persian: sahm-e Imām). The remaining three categories—orphans, the needy, and travelers—are interpreted as orphans, the needy, and travelers from Muhammad's near relatives. Hence three-sixths of the khums are allocated to the members of Muhammad's clan, the Banu Hashim (also called the Hashimites), to ensure that their standard of living corresponds to their high status in Islam. A Hashimite is defined as someone who is a descendant of Hashim, Muhammad's great-grandfather. Among the Hashimites, those who descend from Muhammad's daughter, Fatima, have precedence over others and are called sayyids (Arabic plural: sādāt). Therefore, the second half of khums is referred to as the share of the sayyids (Arabic: sahm as-sādāt; Persian: sahm-e sādāt). In non-Shi’i regions of the Arab world, the sayyids are often referred to as ashrāf (sing. sharīf). The recipients of khums must be Muslim.

Regarding who is responsible for the collection and distribution of khums in accordance with divine intention, the clergy (ulama) teach that they themselves are the rightful trustees for administering the assets of the Hidden Imam. The rationale is that they believe during the period of occultation, the share of the Hidden Imam should be used for purposes that align with the Imam's approval. They hold that the best individuals to determine such purposes are the mujtahids. Consequently, the sahm al-Imam should be entrusted to the most learned and trustworthy mujtahid or utilized in a manner authorized by that mujtahid. The clergy collect both the sahm al-sadat and the sahm al-Imam, distributing the former while utilizing the sahm al-Imam in line with the assumed wishes of the Hidden Imam to benefit Islam and the ummah. By taking on the responsibility of distributing half of the khums to the Hashimites and managing the other half—the Imam's share—as trustees, the clergy have gained control over vast sums of money. Over time, they have also come to control additional sources of income beyond khums. Any misuse of these funds is viewed as a serious offense against the Imam. While many—though not all—clergymen live ascetic lifestyles, there have been repeated complaints and criticisms about the perceived “greed” of the clergy.

Paying khums is to be considered not as a voluntary act of charity but as a religious obligation which must be fulfilled whether one likes it or not. Thus the Shia are required to pay the khums voluntarily as a form of self-taxation. Not paying khums is considered misappropriation of the wealth which rightfully belongs to the Imam and the indigent descendants of Muhammad. All Shi’is are free to decide which particular mujtahid they will pay their khums to. There are several ways to pay khums. An individual can give the khums to any clergyman, such as the local village mullah, who typically has a client relationship with a prominent mujtahid (i.e., ayatollah or grand ayatullah), passing on part of the collected funds to them. Generally, the mullah can keep one-third of the amount for the use of his village community. Residents of a village or city district, or members of an Ashura guild, can also send their khums to a mujtahid of their choice through a delegate and have a portion returned to them. The amount to be returned is usually negotiated with someone authorized by the mujtahid. For example, the son of Ayatullah al-Khu’i, a highly respected Iraqi religious leader who died in 1992, traveled to Hyderabad to collect khums from the faithful there. He announced that the ayatullah had allowed a local guild to use the entire amount collected for a local building project. The amount of khums collected can vary with time, depending on the overall economic well-being of the Shia community. When the community is economically stable, the revenue from khums tends to be significant but, during times of economic difficulty, the amount of khums is often limited.

The mujtahid spends the sahm al-Imam in the way which he thinks will be agreeable to the Hidden Imam Muhammad al-Mahdi. The causes for which the sahm al-Imam is spent presently may include:

- providing the expenditure of seminaries and other religious establishments, their teachers and their students, especially in the centers of religious learning such as Najaf and Qum.
- providing the household and academic expenses of the clergy
- providing the necessary expenses of the poor among the Twelver Shia
- public welfare projects, such as building hospitals
- propagating Islam among Muslims as well as non-Muslims
- paying for disaster relief
- jihad

Sayyids, as descendants of Muhammad, are not permitted to receive alms like zakat from non-Sayyids. However, they can receive khums from Sayyids and non-Sayyids alike. The sahm al-sadat portion of khums is given to the following among the Twelver Shia population:

- sayyids who are poor and needy;
- orphaned sayyids who are poor;
- those stranded travellers who are sayyid and have no funds to continue their journey back home, as long as the journey is not for a sinful purpose. Khums can be provided to assist such a traveler, even if he is wealthy in his own town.

It is prohibited to give khums to a sayyid who is likely to spend any of it on sinful activities, and it is considered advisable not to give it to sayyids who openly engage in what Islam considers immoral behavior, such as drinking alcohol. A layperson can directly give the sahm al-sadat portion of their khums payment to a deserving sayyid without going through the mujtahid. Ayatullah al-Khu'i stated that it is not necessary to seek his permission for distributing sahm al-sadat. In contrast, Ayatullah al-Gulpaygani taught that even sahm al-sadat should be channeled through the mujtahid, but he granted his followers a general permission to distribute sahm al-sadat directly.

The recipients of the sahm al-sadat can change with time, for example, an 'orphan' ceases to be considered an orphan in Islamic law as soon as he reaches adulthood; a 'needy' person ceases to be considered needy as soon he becomes financially independent; and a 'stranded traveler' ceases to be considered a stranded traveler as soon as he reaches home.

=== Role of khums in the independence of the clergy from the state ===
During the Buyid era (322-454 AH/934–1062 CE), Shi’is enjoyed the patronage of the Buyid court in Baghdad and were assigned to important roles. Sharif al-Tahir al-Musawi (a descendant of the seventh Imam, Musa al-Kadhim) was frequently appointed as the official commander of the Iraqi pilgrim caravans to Mecca. He also served as the representative of Muhammad's descendants (termed sayyids or sharifs), overseeing lineage matters and distributing income due to the descendants from endowments and khums. His sons, al-Sharif al-Radi (d. 406/1015) and al-Sharif al-Murtada (d. 436/1044), followed in his footsteps, continuing these responsibilities. During the time of al-Shaykh al-Tusi (d. 460/1067), the collection and use of khums were internal matters for the Shi’i religious community, rather than an official responsibility of the state, because the Shia were still a minority and held no state authority. This principle has largely remained in effect to this day.

In the Twelver Shi‘i system, jurists managed to maintain greater independence from the government, partly due to their reduced reliance on endowment income, which is more susceptible to confiscation or government control. Instead, the Shi‘i scholarly establishment was primarily supported by the payment of khums by lay believers directly to leading Shi‘i scholars. This income often crossed borders and remained beyond the reach of rulers. In contrast, Sunni scholars’ livelihood and appointment to the position of mufti or Shaykh al-Islam depended on the ruler of the country. Khums became a major source of income and financial independence for the clergy in Shi’i-dominated regions. This practice has continued among Shi’i Muslims.

The division of khums into two portions (one portion allocated to the mujtahids and the other portion to support the poor and orphaned descendants of Muhammad) provided the Shi’i clergy (ulama) in Iran with a source of income that granted them independence from the state. Those Shi’i clergy who were also sayyids benefited financially in particular, but importantly, this arrangement reinforced the authority of the jurists in various aspects of fiqh.

The Shi’i clergy were administrators of the khums, especially the “Imam’s share,” during the Safavid era (907-1148/1501-1736). During the Qajar era (1789-1925 CE), khums contributions helped maintain the independence of the clergy from the state and may have provided financial support for the clergy's opposition movement in 20th-century Iran. Traditionally, the Imam's permission is a crucial requirement for participating in jihad. Imami jurists argued that if warriors engage in battle without the Imam's prior approval, all booty acquired belongs to the Imam. However, if jihad is conducted with the Imam's consent, then four-fifths of the spoils are divided among the warriors, while one-fifth goes to the Imam. Items obtained without force are classified as fayʾ, meaning they are considered the personal property of Muhammad, and subsequently, that of the Imam. In the early nineteenth century, Russia began to expand into territories south of the Caucasus Mountains (Georgia, Armenia, and Azerbaijan), which Iran had conquered at the end of the sixteenth century. As Iranian defenses faltered, Fath-Ali Shah Qajar (r. 1797–1834) faced mounting pressure. There was concern that the Muslim populations of the Caucasus might fall under the control of non-Muslims, creating a classic scenario that called for jihad. In 1809, one of the most prominent Shi’i scholars of the time, Shaykh Ja’far Kashif al-Ghita (d. 1228/1813), asserted that during the occultation of the Twelfth Imam, scholars not only had the right but the duty to exercise ijtihad to determine if jihad is deemed necessary, and if it is found to be necessary, they must declare jihad. Kashif al-Ghita believed he was justified in this decision as a mujtahid. He urged the inactive shah to prepare for jihad against the Russians and demanded that the “imam’s share” (sahm al-imam)—half of the khums collected from believers—be allocated for this purpose. Ultimately, the shah yielded to the pressures from the clergy, which had devastating consequences: in the second war with Russia, Iran lost the three provinces south of the Caucasus, which were ceded to Tsarist Russia in the 1828 peace treaty of Turkumenchay.

The Usuli Twelver jurist Muhammad Hasan al-Najafi (d. 1266/1849) was the first mujtahid to delegate his clerical authority to lower-ranking scholars in various urban centers. By establishing a network of representatives, he created a centralized system for the collection of khums and legal administration. This system not only generated a significant source of income and political power that transcended formal political boundaries but also ensured the clerical independence from state authorities.

The Shi’i clergy maintains a close relationship with traditional businesses (the bāzār) in Iranian cities, including handcrafts, trade, and moneylending. The social ties between the mullahs and the predominantly middle-class businesspeople stem not only from their own backgrounds and familial connections but also from their financial dependence on this group. The khums, which includes the “imam’s share” managed by the mullahs, is primarily collected from the income of bazar merchants. Since all Shi’is can choose which mujtahid to pay their khums to, traditional Iranian businesspeople—the bāzāris—wield a form of control; they can support specific mujtahids with their loyalty and financial contributions, allowing others to struggle without support. Mujtahids unable to make charitable contributions, such as providing for their students' basic needs, risk losing their influence. Around 1850, the Qajar shahs, similar to the Ottoman sultans in Istanbul, began a series of reforms aimed at modernizing Iran along European lines. Nasir al-Din Shah (r. 1848–1896) introduced European advisors in military, judicial, and educational sectors, as well as European capital and entrepreneurs who established themselves in Iran and took control of crucial segments of the economy. This shift threatened the bazaris, who feared that their impoverishment would lead to a decline in khums revenue. Additionally, with the establishment of modern educational institutions and judicial systems modeled after European examples, the Shi’i clergy lost two areas of influence they had long monopolized.

The alliance between the bazar and the clergy, the income from the khums and the independence khums granted the clergy from the state played significant roles in the success of the Islamic revolution of 1979.

== Khums in history ==
=== Africa ===
Khums was practiced by Muslim commanders who raided African communities from the 8th century through the early 20th century. However, khums was treated as a concept and the share of booty transferred to the Islamic state was 50%. For example, in 1919, the West African Muslim ruler Hamman Yaji recorded the following in his diary,

"I raided the pagans of Rowa and captured 50 cattle and 33 slaves. We calculated my fifth share [khums] as 17 slaves and 25 cattle."

— Hamman Yaji, Translated by Humphrey Fisher

Similarly, from 8th to 10th century, the Berber people in North Africa were treated as pagans, raided and the booty of seized wealth and slaves were subject to khums.

=== Europe ===
From the 8th century onwards, Southern Europe became a target of raids and military campaigns from Morocco and by the Ottoman Sultanate. After the conquest of Cordoba by Muslim armies, khums (20%) of all moveable booty seized from Christians and Jews after the war was transferred to the caliphal treasury, the rest was distributed among the commanders and Muslim soldiers of the invading army. According to Musa Nusayr, the army commanders also set aside 20% of land vacated by non-Muslims to the caliph. The land that was surrendered by Christians and Jews, but not vacated, became subject to jizya payable by the dhimmis. However, Ibn Hazm states that Muslim soldiers did not set aside or pay khums from the looted property or riches from the annexed land, each kept the spoils for himself. This became one source of distrust and dispute between the Muslim rulers and clergy based in Africa and the new Caliphate of Cordoba in Southwestern Europe. Outside Spain, Ghanima and fayʾ were sought from Muslim conquests in Sicily, Greece and Caucasian region of Europe. Khums was paid from all seized movable property to the caliphal treasury.

=== India ===
From the 10th century through the 18th century, Muslim armies raided non-Muslim kingdoms of India. Some of these Muslim armies came from the northwest, consisting of Turko-Mongols, Persians and Afghans. In other times, these were commanders of Delhi Sultanate. War spoils and looted movable property from non-muslims was subject to khums. The 20% tax was transferred to the treasury of the sultanate, and the 80% was distributed among the commanders, mounted soldiers and foot soldiers. The mounted soldiers were given two to three times as much of the war booty as the foot soldiers. The collected war booty from the treasuries and temples of Hindus were an incentive for war, and the Khums (Ghanima tax) was a source of wealth for the sultans in India. One batch of loot was from Warangal, and it included the Koh-i-Noor, one of the largest known diamonds in human history.

== See also ==
- Zakat
- Qard al-Hassan
- Jizya
- Kharaj
- Nisab
- Dhimmi
- List of expeditions of Muhammad
- Criticism of Twelver Shia Islam
