= Sukur =

Sukur Cultural Landscape
UNESCO World Heritage Site
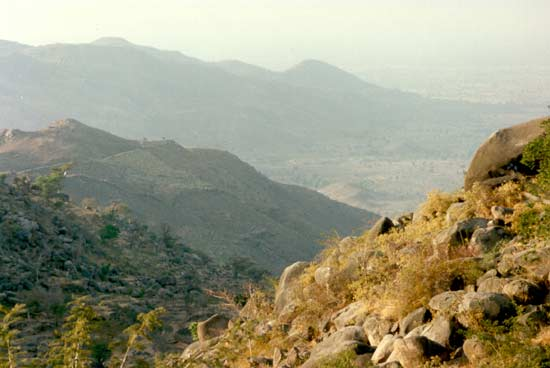

- Location within Nigeria
- Location: Madagali, Nigeria
- Criteria: Cultural: (iii), (v), (vi)
- Reference: 938
- Inscription: 1999 (23rd Session)
- Area: 764.4 ha (1,889 acres)
- Coordinates: 10°44′26″N 13°34′19″E

Sukur or Sukur Cultural Landscape is a UNESCO World Heritage Site located on a hill above the village of Sukur in the Adamawa State of Nigeria. It is situated in the Mandara Mountains, close to the border with Cameroon. Its UNESCO inscription is based on the cultural heritage, material culture, and the naturally-terraced fields. Sukur is Africa's first cultural landscape to receive World Heritage List inscription.

== Etymology ==
'Sukur' means "vengeance" in Margi and Libi languages. It also means "feuding" in the Bura language, a neighbouring and mutually intelligible language the Sukur people.

== History ==
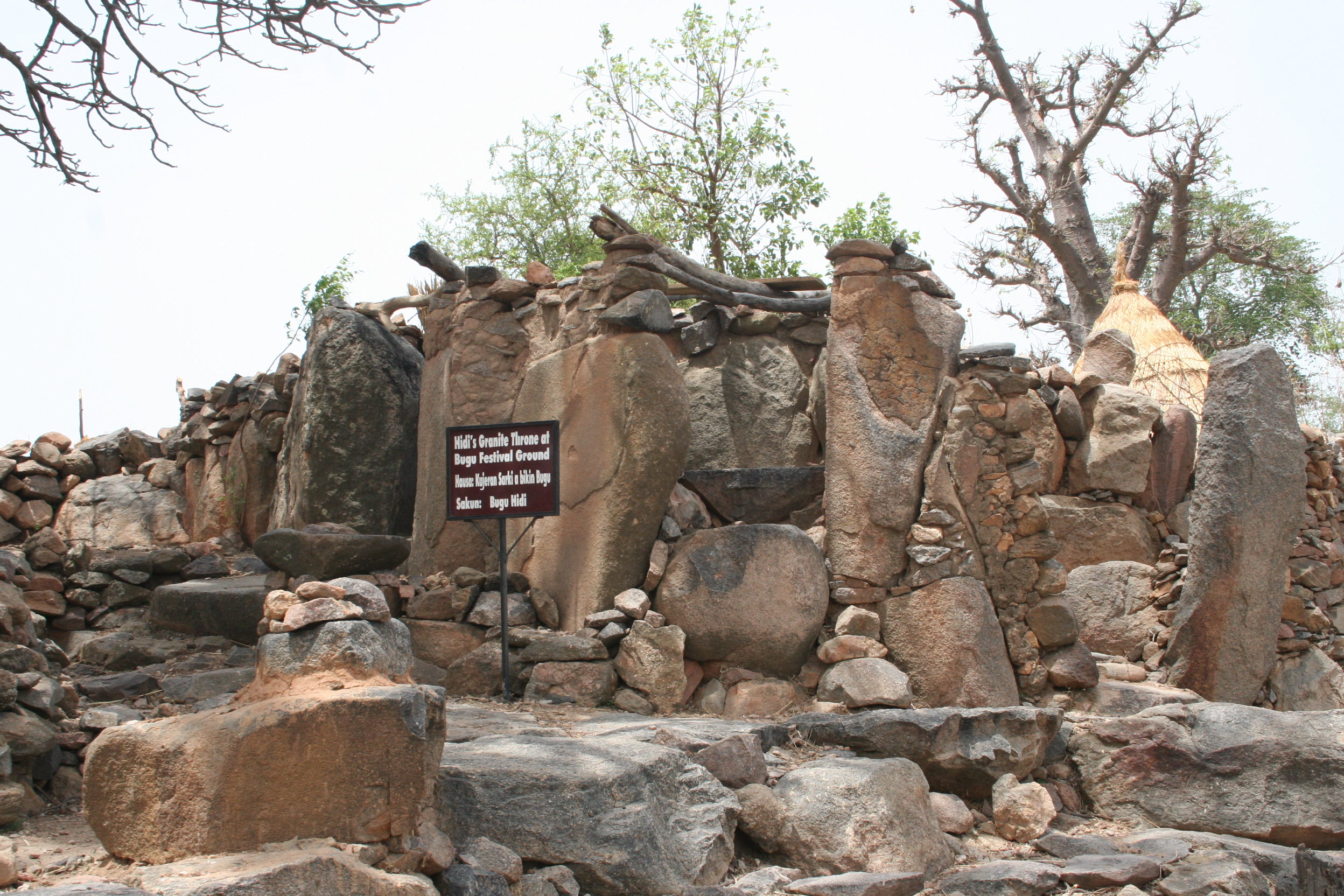
Stone age iron smelting community of Sukur in Adamawa State, Northern Nigeria, now a UNESCO World Cultural Heritage Site

Iron Age relics found in the form of furnaces, ore, and grindstones at the site have been established to be of pre-Sukur existence. There are also some finds from the Neolithic period. The recent history is traced to the Dur dynasty of the 17th century. The Dur established the region as a major supplier of raw material for iron manufacture to northeastern Nigeria; this was perpetuated to the first decade of the 20th century. From 1912 to 1922 Sukur was ravaged by the invasions of Hamman Yaji, the pullo Lamdo (chief) of Madagali. These wars resulted in the decline of iron smelting till 1960, a period which witnessed people migrating to the plains situated towards north and south of Sukur. The British colonising the region from 1927 did not make any difference to the cultural styles of this settlement. Nic David and Judy Sterner gathered information of the generally unknown site and many more publications are being compiled to make this site better known to the outside world.

Its inscription by UNESCO, done under the Criteria of iii, v and vi in 1999, is based on the cultural heritage of the Hidi's Palace complex and village, material culture, and the natural terraced fields, which are in an intact condition. These aspects are cited in the citation which states it as “The cultural landscape of Sukur is eloquent testimony to a strong and continuing cultural tradition that has endured for many centuries.” Sukur is one of the country's two UNESCO World Heritage Sites.

== Features ==
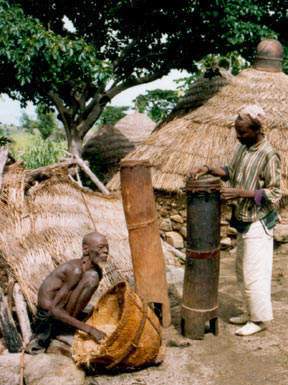
Village hut and Sukur people

The settlement is in two parts. The upper part, where the palace is located, is called the Sakur Sama and the other is Sakur Kasa. The palace located on the hilltop, in a large enclosure has residence of the Hidi (chief). It is a circular structure built from local granite made into dry stone walls and niches. The enclosure also includes a pen for bulls and a horse stable. A harem building located near the palace is in ruins. The entrance to the palace grounds has many gates and one gate is flanked by two large monolithic granite blocks and is fitted with gates. The access path paved with granite stone slabs is from the north and east and is paved; it is of 5.7-metre (19 ft) width. Looking down the hill, the plateau is seen laid into extensive terracing for agricultural farming which is one of the unique features of this site and termed as of "a sacred quality". The palace continues to house the chief of the clan and his wife.

In the lower part of the settlement, village huts are simple circular structures of common folk. They are built of clay with roof of thatch, and with woven floor mats. A group of such houses are surrounded by a compound wall of low height.

The burial grounds located near the palace are simple stone structures representing cemeteries, exclusive to clans and social groups of the settlement.

Another integral feature, with each house of a person practicing smithy of the settlement, is the ruins of iron-smelting furnaces, which are shaft-type furnaces provided with bellows.

All the above features of the settlement presents a heritage status of the political and economic structure of the Sukur people.

== Popular culture ==
In her travel book, Looking for Transwonderland, writer Noo Saro-Wiwa visits Sukur and describes its impact on her.
