= Al-Qard Al-Hasan Association =

Hezbollah-affiliated financial institution

- Type: Non-profit financial institution; Hezbollah's de facto banking arm
- Industry: Financial services
- Founded: 1982; 44 years ago
- Founder: Hezbollah social services
- Headquarters: Beirut, Lebanon
- Number of locations: approx. 30 branches
- Area served: Shias in Lebanon
- Products: Interest-free loans, money transfer, pawn broker, microfinance; allegedly money laundering
- Owner: Hezbollah
- Website: qardhasan.org

Al-Qard Al-Hassan or Al-Qard Al-Hasan Association (Arabic: جمعية مؤسسة القرض الحسن, lit. 'the benevolent loan') is a Hezbollah-affiliated non-profit financial institution, that provides interest-free loans and other financial services in Lebanon. It is based on the Islamic principle of interest-free loans of the same name (Qard al-Hasan).

Al-Qard Al-Hasan was founded as an Islamic financial institution by Hezbollah social services in 1982. Its primary aim was to financially assist the Libanese Shiite community during the hardships of the Lebanese Civil war. It was officially recognised as a social association by the Lebanese government in 1987, and has developed over 30 branches all across Lebanon, including in the Dahieh neighbourhood controlled by Hezbollah. Since the 2019 Lebanese liquidity crisis and the further financial catastrophe as a result of the 2020 Beirut port explosion and COVID-19, Al-Qard Al-Hasan has become increasingly more important as a financial refuge for citizens.

The association operates outside of the regulation and control of the central bank of Lebanon. This has raised concerns about illicit practices and corruption. The association has been sanctioned by the United States due to its ties to Hezbollah since 2007. Al-Qard Al-Hasan has also been classified a terrorist entity by Saudi Arabia in 2021 and Israel in 2024 due to its funding of Hezbollah including support to the group's militant activity.

In October 2024 the association was targeted by Israeli airstrikes.

== History and recent developments ==
In the wake of the Lebanese civil war and the subsequent invasion of Lebanon by the Israeli Defence Forces (IDF), the Al-Qard Al-Hasan association was founded as an Islamic financial institution in 1982 by Hezbollah social services. Its primary aims have been described as providing loans as means to assist Lebanese society in the long term, opposed to the use of short term aid grants, creating long term public support for Hezbollah as a result. The organisation furthermore received an official registration as a social association by the ministry of interior in 1987 under number 217/AD. Since its founding the Al-Qard Al-Hasan association has been estimated to have provided loans worth more than 4 billion dollars in total, currently supporting more than 1.900.000 people with its financial services. In addition, the association has developed over 30 branches all across Lebanon.

Recently the Al-Qard Al-Hasan association has become increasingly relevant in the Lebanese financial sphere, especially so since the country has faced several crises over the last few years. As a result of the still ongoing 2019 liquidity crisis, the traditional banking system has almost completely collapsed. Citizens have not been able to access their savings for several years, and for many people Al-Qard Al-Hasan is an economic lifeline since it is still giving out loans. part from its focus on supporting the Lebanese Shiite community, the association has broadened its range of customers since the crisis, giving out 221.000 loans in 2020 and 2021. The 2020 Beirut port explosion and the COVID-19 crisis have exacerbated financial hardship for the country and there is little optimism regarding swift significant improvements, making Al-Qard Al-Hasan increasingly important for the financial situation of many Lebanese citizens.

== Mode of operation ==
Al-Qard Al-Hasan primarily grants micro-loans to individuals and small businesses and collects deposits in accounts which bear no interest. Loans are mainly granted in United States dollar currency, against the equivalent value in gold and jewellery. Lenders pay a monthly administrative fee of approximately three United States dollars and a fee for the storage of their collateral valuables or gold. Lenders must also save approximately twelve dollars per month in an interest-free account.

Al-Qard Al-Hasan grants micro-loans of up to 5,000 United States dollars. The value of a loan may not exceed 70% of the value of the mortgage. Loans can be repaid over a period of 30 months. When a lender can not repay a loan, their gold or jewellery is sold by Al-Qard Al-Hasan as a means of repayment.

Al-Qard Al-Hasan is registered as a non-governmental organisation. Al-Qard Al-Hasan's name is based on the Islamic concept of Qard Hasan, interest-free lending. Based in the Quran, the concept generally holds that a debtor who can not repay their loan, should be afforded more time to repay the loan, or the creditor should forego the loan as an act of charity. In 2020, the association's executive director, Adel Mansour, stated that Al-Qard Al-Hasan aims to meet various needs such as marriage, the financing of project, and other personal needs. Mansour stated that the association, in line with Qard Hasan, lowers the monthly administration fees and extends the term of the loan in times of difficulty for the lender.

In the wake of the liquidity crisis, the popularity of Al-Qard Al-Hasan greatly increased, with the association granting 200,000 loans in 2019.

=== Criticisms ===
Despite lending its name from the Qard Hasan Islamic banking concept and being registered as a charitable organization, Al-Qard Al-Hasan operates in many ways like a conventional bank. An often observed example is the association's use of ATM machines.

Because it is a non-profit association, Al-Qard Al-Hasan operates outside of the Lebanese banking system. The association is therefore not subject to regulation and control of the Central bank of Lebanon. This structure results in a lack of transparency, which has raised concerns about accountability and corruption.

Many parties have raised worries about the potential destructive impact of the operations of Al-Qard Al-Hasan outside of the regulation of the Central bank of Lebanon. Concerns have been raised about the impact of the association's method of granting unregulated loans in non-Lebanese currency on the stability of and trust in the Lebanese currency. The association has been identified as potentially serving as a channel for money laundering. There have been multiple calls by independent observers and members of the Lebanese Parliament to investigate the association as a de facto bank. They claim the association acts as a bank and should therefore be bound to the supervision and regulation of the Central bank of Lebanon. This would bind the association to regulations, including the safeguarding of the Lebanese currency, instituting safety measures to protect the gold mortgage of borrowers, and the building up of reserve funds.

== Hezbollah affiliation ==
Al-Qard Al-Hasan is a Hezbollah-affiliated organisation. The organization is often described as Hezbollah's financial arm, providing microfinance services to individuals and small businesses in Lebanon. Sayyed Hassan Nasrallah, late leader of Hezbollah, has publicly described the association as supported and protected by Hezbollah and the group encourages Lebanese to make use of Al-Qard Al-Hasan.

Hezbollah has been identified as a significant actor in the reconstruction of Lebanon. Hezbollah provides welfare support and social services, and has exerted control over state institutions during various crises. Al-Qard Al-Hasan positions itself as a charitable organization, working to relieve poverty in Lebanon. In the wake of the ongoing liquidity crisis and the Beirut port explosion of 2020, Al-Qard Al-Hasan has provided a financial safety net for many Shiite families in Lebanon.

Many parties, including the United States and Israel, as well as Lebanese observers, have accused Hezbollah of using Al-Qard Al-Hasan to abuse Lebanon's financial crisis for their political aims, under the cover of charity. Hezbollah has been accused of enforcing, through Al-Qard Al-Hasan, a system of political patronage.

=== United States sanctions ===
In July 2007, the U.S. Treasury Department designated Al-Qard Al-Hasan as a terrorist organization, for "being owned or controlled by, and providing support to", Hezbollah. The U.S. Treasury Department claims that Al-Qard Al-Hasan has been used by Hezbollah as "a cover to manage the terrorist group's financial activities and gain access to the international financial system".

In May 2021, the Treasury Department put sanctions upon seven individuals connected to Hezbollah and Al-Qard Al-Hasan, with the aim of barring these individuals from owning property or enacting transactions within the United States banking system. A Treasury Department official stated that Hezbollah abuses the Lebanese banking sector to drain the financial resources of the Lebanese people, "hoarding hard currency that is desperately needed by the Lebanese economy" and compromising the stability of Lebanon. Al-Qard Al-Hasan and Hezbollah claim the bank is a non-profit association aimed at supporting the reconstruction of Lebanon. The Treasury Department claims this is a cover for the association's illicit practices as part of Hezbollah's shadow banking network.

The sanctions brought upon Al-Qard Al-Hasan and affiliated individuals by the United States have far-reaching implications for the association. The sanctions limit Qard Al-Hassan's access to international financial systems and complicate its operations outside of Lebanon.

=== 2024 Israeli airstrikes ===
In the night of October 20–21, 2024, a number of Al-Qard Al-Hasan buildings in Beirut were targeted by Israeli airstrikes. The Israeli military has said that the attacks were aimed to harm Hezbollah's infrastructure and to affect the trust between Hezbollah and the Shiite community in Lebanon. This is in accordance with Israel's Dahiya Doctrine, a military strategy involving the large-scale destruction of civilian infrastructure, or domicide, to pressure hostile governments.

==== Alleged international human rights law violations ====
Experts have identified the attack as an attempt by Israel to undermine the trust of Lebanese in Hezbollah and destroy civilian infrastructure to weaken resistance. Human rights organizations have condemned the airstrikes, stating that the targeting of Al-Qard Al-Hasan branches violates international human rights law. Under customary international law, parties must distinguish between 'military objectives' and 'civilian objects'. Only the latter may be the target of military action. Human rights organizations have stated that Al-Qard Al-Hasan's association with Hezbollah is not sufficient for its classification as a military objective, and have called for the airstrikes to be investigated as war crimes. The United Nations Human Rights Office has condemned the attacks for the extensive damage done to civilian objects. It has called for Israel to respect international humanitarian law.

In July 2025 Lebanon has banned dealing with Hezbollah financial entity, the Al-Qard Al-Hassan bank.

=== 2026 Lebanon war ===
Israel's efforts against Hezbollah in the 2026 Lebanon war focused on its military assets as well as its finances, with an emphasis on the estimated $700 million directed from Iran each year through intermediaries that accounted for most of Hezbollah's annual operating budget. Some of the earliest Israeli military efforts in March 2026 targeted branches of the Al-Qard Al-Hasan Association, as well as the organization's supply of gold and foreign currency.
