= Israeli airstrikes on Al Qard Al Hasan =

Attack on economic institutions in Lebanon

- Part of 2024 Israeli invasion of Lebanon and Israel-Hezbollah conflict
- Location: Lebanon
- Date: 20–21 October 2024

The Israel Defense Forces conducted airstrikes on the Al-Qard Al-Hasan Association, a Hezbollah-linked financial institution on the night of October 20–21, 2024. During these airstrikes, the Israeli air force targeted a number of Al-Qard Al-Hassan's sites in Lebanon. Israel says AQAH finances Hezbollah's military activities - a claim the group denies, saying it has no role other than providing small, interest-free loans to ordinary Lebanese, in line with Islamic law's ban on receiving interest.

== Stated Purpose of strikes ==
The association provides social services to the Shiite community in Lebanon and is said to be a major source of funding for Hezbollah's activities. These attacks aimed to harm Hezbollah's economic infrastructure, particularly its funding sources. Due to Al-Qard Al-Hasan's links to Hezbollah, the organisation has been subject to sanctions by the United States. According to the US Treasury Department, Al-Qard Al-Hasan says it serves the people of Lebanon but in practice “illicitly moves funds through shell accounts and facilitators”. Israeli sources indicated that the airstrikes aimed to damage Hezbollah's operational capabilities and funding during the military confrontation, hinder its ability to rebuild after the conflict, and undermine the trust between Hezbollah and the Shiite population in Lebanon. An Israeli source said that Al-Qard Al-Hasan helped fund Hezbollah's operations.

== Pre-strike evacuations ==
Before the airstrikes began, the Israeli army issued specific evacuation warnings to residents living near the targets. Israel gave warnings for more than a dozen buildings in Beirut according to The New Arab. As a result, there were reports of mass movement among displaced individuals fleeing from Beirut and other targeted areas, including the Dahieh, the Beqaa Valley, and southern Lebanon.

== Analysis ==
From the perspective of international humanitarian law, experts say AQAH is not a legitimate military objective, regardless of Israel's claims about its role in financing Hezbollah. According to Ben Saul, UN Special Rapporteur on Human Rights and Counter-Terrorism, “International humanitarian law does not permit attacks on the economic or financial infrastructure of an adversary, even if they indirectly sustain its military activities.”

Amal Saad, a leading expert on Hezbollah, believes that the aim of these attacks is to destroy what is also known as the Hezbollah’s "community of resistance." According to Saad, Hezbollah's civilian institutions influence hundreds of thousands of Lebanese, mostly Shiites and these attacks are a way to further "strangulating the community".
