= Zakat =

Form of almsgiving obligatory in Islam

Zakat spending as per the Quran on 8 categories of people

Zakat (or Zakāh) is one of the Five Pillars of Islam. Zakat is the Arabic word for "giving to charity" or "giving to the needy". (Note: Arabic: زكاة [zæˈkæː(h)], "that which purifies"/"alms", also Zakāt al-māl [zæˈkæːt ælˈmæːl] زكاة المال, "zakat on wealth", or Zakāt in the construct case.) Zakat is a form of almsgiving, often collected by the Muslim Ummah. It is considered in Islam a religious obligation, and by Quranic ranking, is next after prayer (salah) in importance. Eight heads of zakat are mentioned in the Quran.

As one of the Five Pillars of Islam, zakat is a religious duty for all Muslims who meet the necessary criteria of wealth to help the needy. It is a mandatory charitable contribution, often considered to be a tax. The payment and disputes on zakat have played a major role in the history of Islam, notably during the Ridda wars.

Zakat on wealth is based on the disposable income of an individual after fulfilling all their essential needs. It is customarily 2.5% (or 1/40) of a Muslim's total disposable income after the necessities of their dependents and themselves, and Muslims who do not hold wealth above a minimum amount known as nisab do not need to pay Zakat, but Islamic scholars differ on how much nisab is and other aspects of zakat. According to Islamic doctrine, the collected amount should be paid to the poor and the needy, Zakat collectors, orphans, widows, those to be freed from slavery, the aged who cannot work to feed themselves, those in debt, in the cause of God and to benefit the stranded traveller.

Today, in most Muslim-majority countries, zakat contributions are voluntary, while in Libya, Malaysia, Pakistan, Saudi Arabia, Sudan and Yemen, zakat is mandated and collected by the state (as of 2015).

Shias, unlike Sunnis, have traditionally regarded zakat as a private action, and they give zakat to imam-sponsored rather than state-sponsored collectors, but it is also obligatory for them.

Many Muslims choose Ramadan as a time to calculate and distribute zakat because charitable acts are believed to carry greater spiritual significance during the month. Some online tools are also available to help individuals estimate their zakat obligations.

== Etymology ==
The word Zakat comes from Arabic root z-k-w (ز ك و), meaning to purify. Zakat is considered a way to purify one's income and wealth from sometimes worldly, impure ways of acquisition. According to Sachiko Murata and William Chittick, "Just as ablutions purify the body and salah purifies the soul (in Islam), so zakat purifies possessions and makes them pleasing to God."

== Doctrine ==
=== Quran ===
The Quran discusses charity in many verses, some of which relate to zakat. The word zakat, with the meaning used in Islam now, is found, for example, in surahs: 7:156, 9:60, 19:31, 19:55, 21:73, 23:4, 27:3, 30:39, 31:4, and 41:7. Zakat is found in the early Medinan suras and described as obligatory for Muslims. It is given for the sake of salvation. Muslims believe those who give zakat can expect reward from God in the afterlife, while neglecting to give zakat can result in damnation. Zakat is considered part of the covenant between God and a Muslim.

Verse 2:177 (the Clear Qur'an translation) sums up the Quranic view of charity and almsgiving (another name for zakat is the poor due):

Righteousness is not in turning your faces towards the east or the west. Rather, the righteous are those who believe in Allah, the Last Day, the angels, the Books, and the prophets; who give charity out of their cherished wealth to relatives, orphans, the poor, ˹needy˺ travellers, beggars, and for freeing captives; who establish prayer, pay alms-tax, and keep the pledges they make; and who are patient in times of suffering, adversity, and in ˹the heat of˺ battle. It is they who are true ˹in faith˺, and it is they who are mindful ˹of Allah˺. – 2:177

According to Yusuf al-Qaradawi, verse 9.5 of the Quran makes zakat one of three prerequisites for pagans to become Muslims: "but if they repent, establish prayers, and practice zakat they are your brethren in faith".

The Quran also lists who should receive the benefits of zakat, discussed in more detail below.

Mention of zakat after prayer suggests that it held a different role than almsgiving. Zakat served as a fine or payment for someone guilty of sin to have Muhammad pray for their purification.

=== Hadith ===
Each of the most trusted hadith collections in Islam have a book dedicated to zakat. Sahih Bukhari's Book 24, Sahih Muslim's Book 12, and Sunan Abu-Dawud's Book 9 discuss various aspects of zakat, including who must pay, how much, when and what. The 2.5% rate is also mentioned in the hadiths.

The hadiths admonish those who do not give the zakat. According to the hadith, refusal to pay or mockery of those who pay zakat is a sign of hypocrisy, and God will not accept the prayers of such people. The sunna also describes God's punishment for those who refuse or fail to pay zakat. On the day of Judgment, those who did not give the zakat will be held accountable and punished.

The hadith contain advice on the state-authorized collection of the zakat. The collectors are required not to take more than what is due, and those who are paying the zakat are asked not to evade payment. The hadith also warn of punishment for those who take zakat when they are not eligible to receive it (see Distribution below).

=== Amount ===
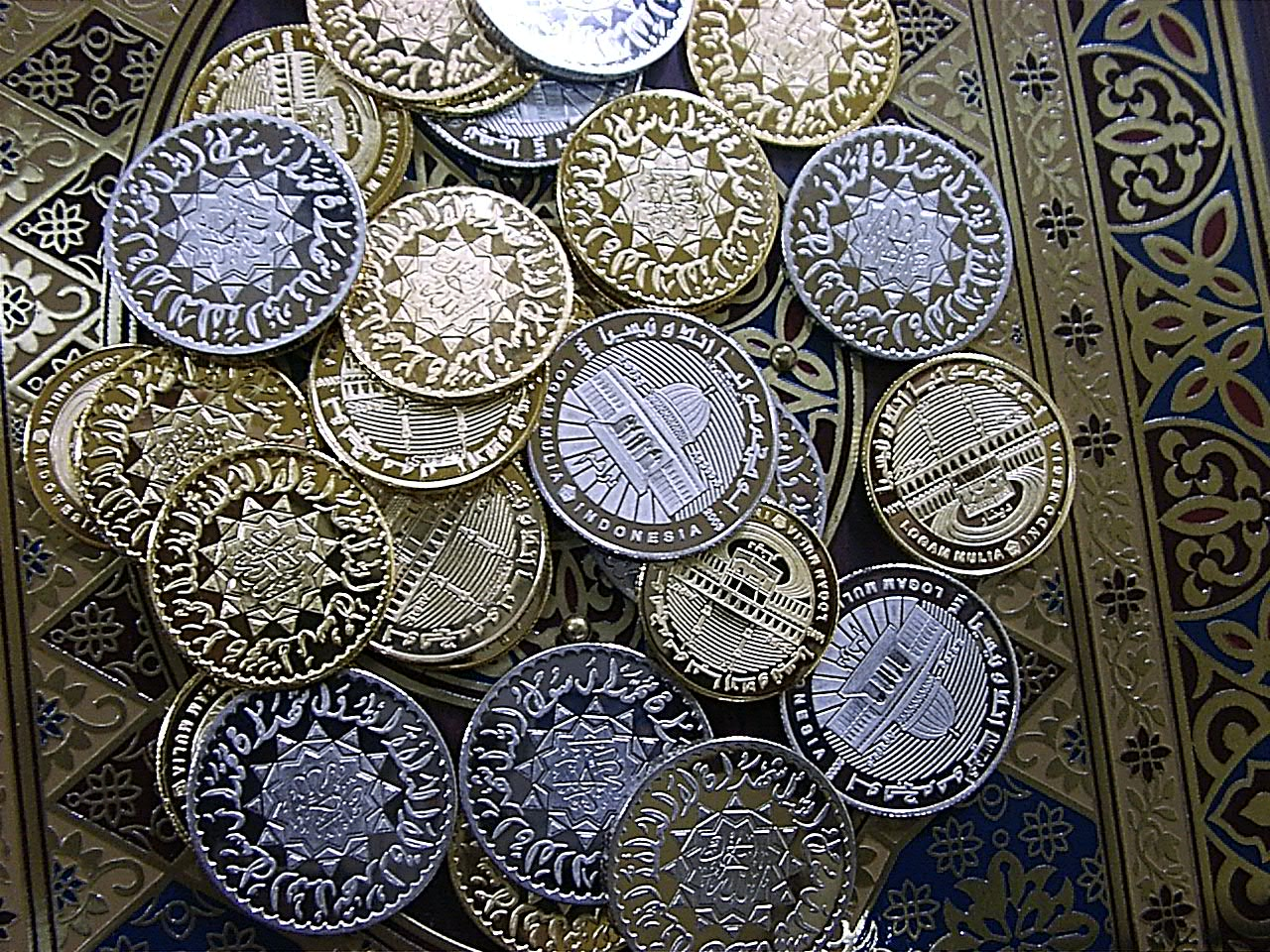
Silver or gold coinage is one way of granting zakat.

The amount of zakat to be paid by an individual depends on the amount of money and the type of assets the individual possesses. The Quran does not provide specific guidelines on which types of wealth are taxable under the zakat, nor does it specify percentages to be given. However, it clearly indicates to donate the "surplus" of one's income. But the customary practice in the Islamic world has been that the amount of zakat paid on capital assets (e.g. money) is 2.5% (1/40). Zakat is additionally payable on agricultural goods, precious metals, minerals, and livestock at a rate varying between 2.5% and 20% (1/5), depending on the type of goods.

Zakat is usually payable on assets continuously owned over one lunar year that are in excess of the nisab, a minimum monetary value. However, Islamic scholars have disagreed on this issue. For example, Abu Hanifa did not regard the nisab limit to be a pre-requisite for zakat, in the case of land crops, fruits and minerals. Other differences between Islamic scholars on zakat and nisab are acknowledged as follows by Yusuf al-Qaradawi,

Unlike prayers, we observe that even the ratio, the exemption, the kinds of wealth that are zakatable are subject to differences among scholars. Such differences have serious implications for Muslims at large when it comes to their application of the Islamic obligation of zakat. For example, some scholars consider the wealth of children and insane individuals zakatable, others don't. Some scholars consider all agricultural products zakatable, others restrict zakat to specific kinds only. Some consider debts zakatable, others don't. Similar differences exist for business assets and women's jewelry. Some require certain minimum (nisab) for zakatability, some don't. etc. The same kind of differences also exist about the disbursement of zakat.
– Shiekh Mahmud Shaltut

=== Failure to pay ===
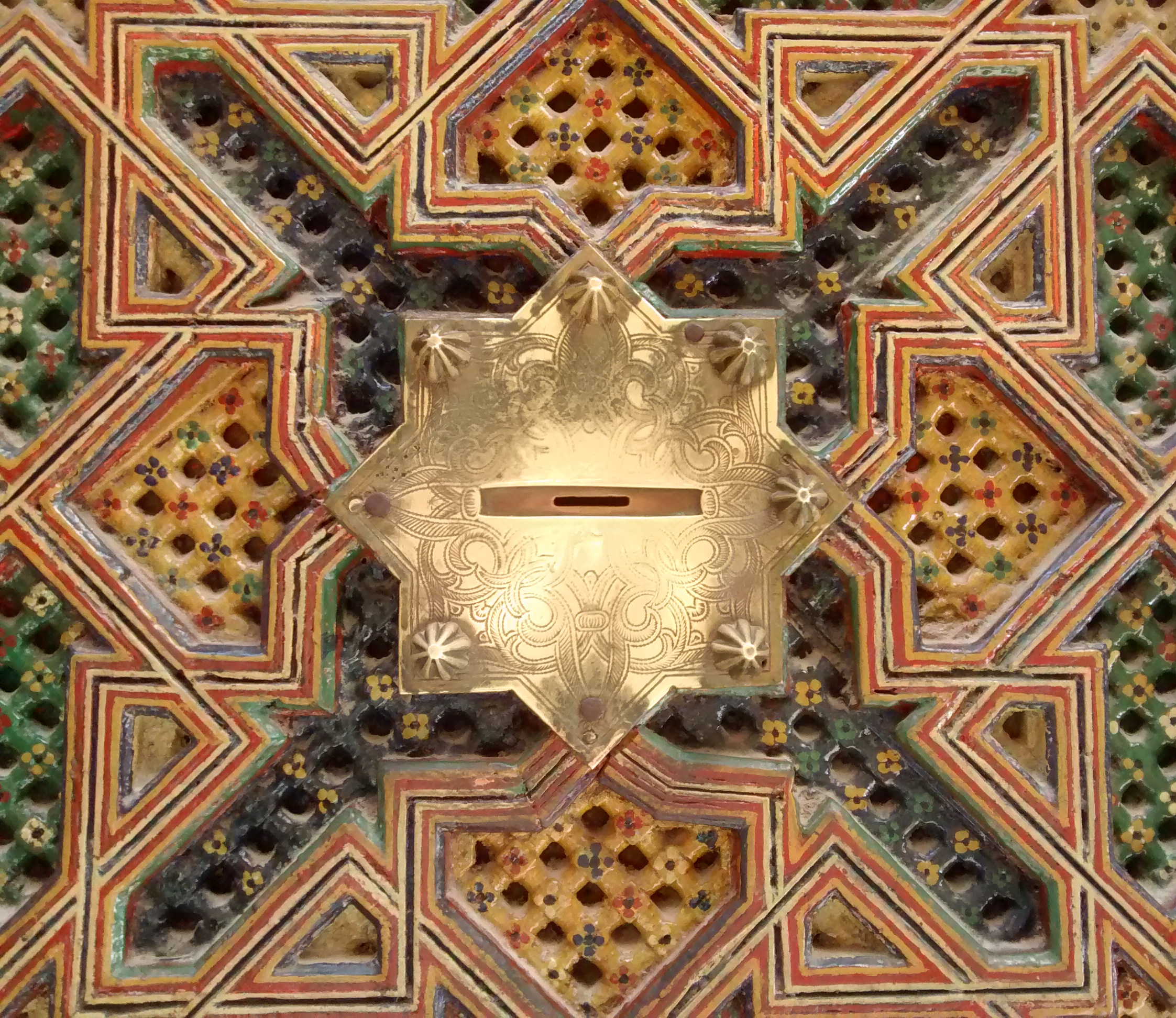
A slot for giving zakat at the Zaouia Moulay Idriss II in Fez, Morocco

The consequence of failure to pay zakat has been a subject of extensive legal debate in traditional Islamic jurisprudence, particularly when a Muslim is willing to pay zakat but refuses to pay it to a certain group or the state. According to classical jurists, if the collector is unjust in the collection of zakat but just in its distribution, the concealment of property from him is allowed. If, on the other hand, the collector is just in the collection but unjust in the distribution, the concealment of property from him is an obligation (wajib). Furthermore, if the zakat is concealed from a just collector because the property owner wanted to pay his zakat to the poor himself, they held that he should not be punished for it. If collection of zakat by force was not possible, use of military force to extract it was seen as justified, as was done by Abu Bakr during the Ridda Wars, on the argument that refusing to submit to just orders is a form of treason. However, Abu Hanifa, the founder of the Hanafi school, disapproved of fighting when the property owners undertake to distribute the zakat to the poor themselves.

Some classical jurists held the view that any Muslim who consciously refuses to pay zakat is an apostate, since the failure to believe that it is a religious duty (fard) is a form of unbelief (kufr), and should be killed. However, prevailing opinion among classical jurists prescribed sanctions such as fines, imprisonment or corporal punishment. Some classical and contemporary scholars such as Ishaq Ibn Rahwayh and Yusuf al-Qaradawi have stated that the person who fails to pay Zakat should have the payment taken from them, along with half of his wealth. Additionally, those who failed to pay the zakat would face God's punishment in the afterlife on the day of Judgment.

In modern states where zakat payment is compulsory, failure to pay is regulated by state law similarly to tax evasion.

=== Distribution ===
According to the Quran's Surah Al-Tawba, there are eight categories of people (asnaf) who qualify to benefit from zakat funds.

Alms-tax is only for the poor and the needy, for those employed to administer it, for those whose hearts are attracted ˹to the faith˺, for ˹freeing˺ slaves, for those in debt, for Allah's cause, and for ˹needy˺ travellers. ˹This is˺ an obligation from Allah. And Allah is All-Knowing, All-Wise.

— Surah At-Tawbah 9:60

Islamic scholars have traditionally interpreted this verse as identifying the following eight categories of Muslim causes to be the proper recipients of zakat:

1. Those living without means of livelihood (Al-Fuqarā'), the poor
2. Those who cannot meet their basic needs (Al-Masākīn), the needy
3. To zakat collectors (Al-Āmilīyn 'Alihā)
4. To persuade those sympathetic to or expected to convert to Islam (Al-Mu'allafatu Qulūbuhum), recent converts to Islam, and potential allies in the cause of Islam
5. To free from slavery or servitude (Fir-Riqāb), slaves of Muslims who have or intend to free from their master by means of a kitabah contract
6. Those who have incurred overwhelming debts while attempting to satisfy their basic needs (Al-Ghārimīn), debtors who in pursuit of a worthy goal incurred a debt
7. Those fighting for a religious cause or a cause of God (Fī Sabīlillāh), or for Jihad in the way of Allah by means of pen, word, or sword, or for Islamic warriors who fight against the unbelievers but are not salaried soldiers.
8. Wayfarers, stranded travellers (Ibnu Al-Sabīl), travellers who are traveling with a worthy goal but cannot reach their destination without financial assistance

Zakat should not be given to one's own parents, grandparents, children, grandchildren, spouses or the descendants of Muhammad.

Neither the Quran nor the Hadiths specify the relative division of zakat into the above eight categories. According to the Reliance of the Traveller, the Shafi'i school requires zakat is to be distributed equally among the eight categories of recipients, while the Hanafi school permits zakat to be distributed to all the categories, some of them, or just one of them. Classical schools of Islamic law, including Shafi'i, are unanimous that collectors of zakat are to be paid first, with the balance to be distributed equally amongst the remaining seven categories of recipients, even in cases where one group's need is more demanding.

Muslim scholars disagree whether zakat recipients can include non-Muslims. Islamic scholarship, historically, has taught that only Muslims can be recipients of zakat. In recent times, some state that zakat may be paid to non-Muslims after the needs of Muslims have been met, finding nothing in the Quran or sunna to indicate that zakat should be paid to Muslims only.

Additionally, the zakat funds may be spent on the administration of a centralized zakat collection system. Representatives of the Salafi movement include propagation of Islam and any struggle in righteous cause among permissible ways of spending, while others argue that zakat funds should be spent on social welfare and economic development projects, or science and technology education. Some hold spending them for defense to be permissible if a Muslim country is under attack. Also, it is forbidden to disburse zakat funds into investments instead of being given to one of the above eight categories of recipients.

=== Role in society ===
The zakat is considered by Muslims to be an act of piety through which one expresses concern for the well-being of fellow Muslims, as well as preserving social harmony between the wealthy and the poor. Zakat promotes a more equitable redistribution of wealth and fosters a sense of solidarity amongst members of the Ummah.

== Historical practice ==
Zakat, an Islamic practice initiated by the Islamic prophet Muhammad, was first collected on the first day of Muharram. It has played an important role throughout its history. Schact suggests that the idea of zakat may have entered Islam from Judaism, with roots in the Hebrew and Aramaic word zakut. However, some Islamic scholars disagree that the Qur'anic verses on zakat (or zakah) have roots in Judaism.

The caliph Abu Bakr, believed by Sunni Muslims to be Muhammad's successor, was the first to institute a statutory zakat system. Abu Bakr established the principle that the zakat must be paid to the legitimate representative of Muhammad's authority (i.e. himself). However certain tribes refused to pay zakat while staying under the name of Islam which was considered apostasy and led ultimately, to the Ridda wars.

The second and third caliphs, Umar ibn al-Khattab and Uthman ibn Affan, continued Abu Bakr's codification of the zakat. Uthman also modified the zakat collection protocol by decreeing that only "apparent" wealth was taxable, which had the effect of limiting zakat to mostly being paid on agricultural land and produce. During the reign of Ali ibn Abu Talib, the issue of zakat was tied to legitimacy of his government. After Ali, his supporters refused to pay zakat to Muawiyah I, as they did not recognize his legitimacy.

The practice of Islamic state-administered zakat was short-lived in Medina. During the reign of Umar bin Abdul Aziz (717–720 CE), it is reported that no one in Medina needed the zakat. After him, zakat came more to be considered as an individual responsibility. This view changed over Islamic history. Sunni Muslims and rulers, for example, considered collection and disbursement of zakat as one of the functions of an Islamic state; this view has continued in modern Islamic countries.

Zakat is one of the five pillars of Islam, and in various Islamic polities of the past was expected to be paid by all practising Muslims who have the financial means (nisab). In addition to their zakat obligations, Muslims were encouraged to make voluntary contributions (sadaqat). The zakat was not collected from non-Muslims, although they were required to pay the jizyah tax. Depending on the region, the dominant portion of zakat went typically to Amil (the zakat collectors) or Sabīlillāh (those fighting for religious cause, the caretaker of local mosque, or those working in the cause of God such as proselytizing non-Muslims to convert to Islam).

== Contemporary practice ==
According to the researcher Russell Powell in 2010, zakat was mandatory by state law in Libya, Malaysia, Pakistan, Saudi Arabia, Sudan, and Yemen. There were government-run voluntary zakat contribution programs in Bahrain, Bangladesh, Egypt, Indonesia, Iran, Jordan, Kuwait, Lebanon, Maldives and the United Arab Emirates.

In a 2019 study conducted by the Institute for Social Policy and Understanding that examined philanthropy for American Muslims in comparison to other faith and non-faith groups, it was found that for American Muslims, Zakat was an important driver of charitable giving. This results in American Muslims being the most likely faith group studied to be motivated to donate based on a believed religious obligation (zakat), and a "feeling that those with more should help those with less", referencing again the concept and religious imperative behind Zakat.

=== Zakat status in countries ===
Country	Status
Afghanistan	Voluntary
Algeria	Voluntary
Azerbaijan	Voluntary
Bahrain	Regulated by the state, but contributions are voluntary
Bangladesh	Regulated by the state, but contributions are voluntary
Burkina Faso	Voluntary
Chad	Voluntary
Egypt	Regulated by the state, but contributions are voluntary
Guinea	Voluntary
Indonesia	Regulated by the state, but contributions are voluntary
Iran	Regulated by the state, but contributions are voluntary
Iraq	Voluntary
Jordan	Regulated by the state, but contributions are voluntary
Kazakhstan	Voluntary
Kuwait	Regulated by the state, but contributions are voluntary
Lebanon	Regulated by the state, but contributions are voluntary
Libya	Mandatory
Malaysia	Mandatory for Muslims
Maldives	Regulated by the state, but contributions are voluntary
Mali	Voluntary
Mauritania	Voluntary
Morocco	Voluntary
Niger	Voluntary
Nigeria	Voluntary
Oman	Voluntary
Pakistan	Mandatory
Qatar	Voluntary
Saudi Arabia	Mandatory
Senegal	Voluntary
Sierra Leone	Voluntary
Singapore	Regulated by the state, but contributions are voluntary
Somalia	Voluntary
Sudan	Mandatory
Syria	Voluntary
Tajikistan	Voluntary
Gambia	Voluntary
Tunisia	Voluntary
Turkey	Voluntary
Turkmenistan	Voluntary
United Arab Emirates	Regulated by the state, but contributions are voluntary
Uzbekistan	Voluntary
Yemen	Mandatory

=== Collection ===
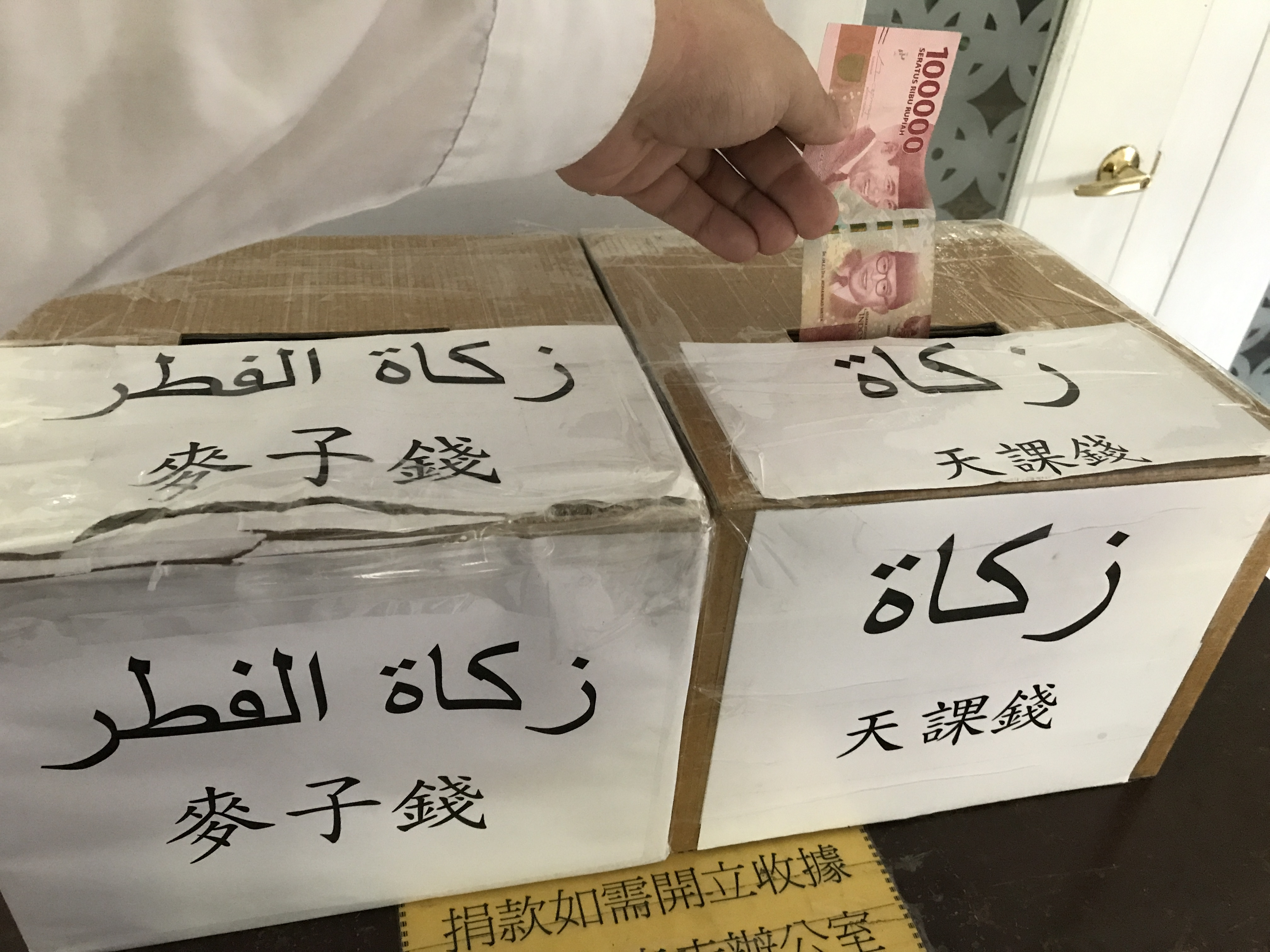
Zakat donation box at Taipei Grand Mosque in Taipei, Taiwan

Today, in most Muslim countries, Zakat is at the discretion of Muslims over how and whether to pay, typically enforced by fear of God, peer pressure, and an individual's personal feelings. Among the Sunni Muslims, Zakat committees, linked to a religious cause or local mosque, collect zakat. Among the Shia Muslims, deputies on behalf of Imams collect the zakat.

In six of the 47 Muslim-majority countries—Libya, Malaysia, Pakistan, Saudi Arabia, Sudan, and Yemen—zakat is obligatory and collected by the state. In Jordan, Bahrain, Kuwait, Lebanon, and Bangladesh, the zakat is regulated by the state, but contributions are voluntary.

The states where Zakat is compulsory differ in their definition of the base for zakat computation. Zakat is generally levied on livestock (except in Pakistan) and agricultural produce, although the types of taxable livestock and produce differ from country to country. Zakat is imposed on cash and precious metals in four countries with different methods of assessment. Income is subject to zakat in Saudi Arabia and Malaysia, while only Sudan imposes zakat on "wealth that yields income". In Malaysia, zakat can be directly deducted from one's income tax obligations. In Pakistan, property is exempt from the zakat calculation basis, and the compulsory zakat is primarily collected from the agriculture sector.

Under compulsory systems of zakat tax collection, such as Malaysia and Pakistan, evasion is very common and the zakat (alms tax) is regressive. A considerable number of Muslims accept their duty to pay zakat, but deny that the state has a right to levy it, and they may pay zakat voluntarily while evading official collection. In discretion-based systems of collection, studies suggest zakat is collected from and paid only by a fraction of Muslim population who can pay.

In the United Kingdom, which has a Muslim minority, more than three out of ten Muslims gave to charity (Zakat being described as "the Muslim practice of charitable donations"), according to a 2013 poll of 4000 people. According to the self-reported poll, British Muslims, on average, gave US$567 to charity in 2013, compared to $412 for Jews, $308 for Protestants, $272 for Catholics and $177 for atheists.

=== Distribution ===
The primary sources of sharia also do not specify to whom the zakat should be paid – to zakat collectors claiming to represent one class of zakat beneficiary (for example, poor), collectors who were representing religious bodies, or collectors representing the Islamic state. This has caused significant conflicts and allegations of zakat abuse within the Islamic community, both historically and in modern times.

Fi Sabillillah is the most prominent asnaf in Southeast Asian Muslim societies, where it broadly construed to include funding missionary work, Quranic schools and anything else that serves the Islamic community (ummah) in general.

=== Role in society ===
In 2012, Islamic financial analysts estimated annual zakat spending between US$200 billion and US$1 trillion per year, which would be at least 15 times more than global humanitarian aid tracked by the United Nations. Islamic scholars and development workers state that much of this zakat practice is mismanaged, wasted or ineffective. About a quarter of the Muslim world continues to live on $1.25 a day or less, according to the 2012 report.

A 1999 study of Sudan and Pakistan, where zakat is mandated by the state, estimated that zakat proceeds ranged between 0.3 and 0.5 percent of GDP, while a more recent report put zakat proceeds in Malaysia at 0.1% of GDP. These numbers are far below what was expected when the governments of these countries tried to Islamize their economies, and the collected amount is too small to have a sizeable macroeconomic effect.

In a 2014 study, Nasim Shirazi states widespread poverty persists in Islamic world despite zakat collections every year. Over 70% of the Muslim population in most Muslim countries is impoverished and lives on less than US$2 per day. In over 10 Muslim-majority countries, over 50% of the population lived on less than $1.25 per day income, states Shirazi. Zakat has so far failed to relieve large scale absolute poverty among Muslims in most Muslim countries.

== Related terms ==
Zakat is required of Muslims only. For non-Muslims living in an Islamic state, sharia was historically seen as mandating jizya (poll tax). Other forms of taxation on Muslims or non-Muslims, that have been used in Islamic history, include kharaj (land tax), khums (tax on booty and loot seized from non-Muslims, sudden wealth), ushur (tax at state border, sea port, and each city border on goods movement, customs), kari (house tax) and chari (sometimes called maara, pasture tax).

There are differences in the interpretation and scope of zakat and other related taxes in various sects of Islam. For example, khums is interpreted differently by Sunnis and Shi'ites, with Shia expected to pay one fifth of their excess income after expenses as khums, while Sunnis do not. At least a tenth part of zakat and khums every year, among Shi'ites, after its collection by Imam and his religious deputies under its doctrine of niyaba, goes as income for its hierarchical system of Shia clergy. Among Ismaili sub-sect of Shias, the mandatory taxes which includes zakat, is called dasond, and 20% of the collected amount is set aside as income for the Imams. Some branches of Shia Islam treat the right to lead as Imam and right to receive 20% of collected zakat and other alms as a hereditary right of its clergy.

Sadaqah is another related term for charity, usually construed as a discretionary counterpart to zakat.

=== Zakat al-Fitr ===
Zakat al-Fitr or Sadaqat al-Fitr is another, smaller charitable obligation, mandatory for all Muslims—male or female, minor or adult as long as he/she has the means to do so—that is traditionally paid at the end of the fasting in the Islamic holy month of Ramadan. The collected amount is used to pay the zakat collectors and to the poor Muslims so that they may be provided with a means to celebrate Eid al-Fitr (the festival of breaking the fast) following Ramadan, along with the rest of the Muslims.

Zakat al-Fitr is a fixed amount assessed per person, while Zakat al-mal is based on personal income and property. According to one source, the Hidaya Foundation, the suggested Zakat al-Fitr donation is based on the price of 1 Sa (approx. 3 kg) of rice or wheat at local costs, (as of 2015, approximately $7.00 in the U.S.).

== See also ==
=== Islam related ===
- Glossary of Islam
- Outline of Islam
- Index of Islam-related articles
- Islamic economics
- Islamic socialism
- Islamic taxes
- Riba
- Sadaqah
- Qard al-Hasan
- Zakat Council (Pakistan)
- Zakat al-Fitr, a different form of zakat which follows the pillar of Sawm (fasting in Ramadan)

=== Charity practices in other religions ===
- Dāna (Hinduism, Buddhism, Jainism, Sikhism)
- Dhutanga (Buddhism)
- Dasvandh (Sikhism)
- Poor man's tithe (Judaism)
- Tithe
- Tithes in Judaism
- Tithing in Mormonism
- Tzedakah (Judaism)
- Zidqa, almsgiving in Mandaeism

=== Related contemporary topics ===
- Remittance
- Hawala
- Informal value transfer system
- Wealth tax
- Animal husbandry in Afghanistan
