= Qard al-Hasan =

Islamic concept of interest-free lending

Qardh al-hasan (Arabic: قرض الحسن, transl. benevolent lending) is an Islamic concept of interest-free lending. It is based on the principle of helping others without expecting a financial gain. However some Ulama deem it a form of interest-free loan (fungible, marketable wealth) that is extended by a lender to a borrower on the basis of benevolence (ihsan). Al-qardh, from a shari’a point of view, is a non commutative contract, as it involves a facility granted only for the sake of tabarru’ (donation).

Therefore, al-qardh al-hasan is a gratuitous loan extended to people in need, for a specified period of time. At the end of that period, the face value of the loan (asl al-qardh) is to be paid off. In other words, shari’a prohibits the stipulation of an excess for the lender, as it amounts to riba, whether the excess is expressed in terms of quality or quantity, or it is a tangible item or a benefit. However, it is permitted that the repayment of qardh (loan extinguishing) is made with an excess (tangible item, benefit, service, etc.) If such an excess is neither expressly stipulated nor implicitly pre-arranged (through collusion or tawatu’) in the contract of loan.

== Etymology ==
Qardh (Arabic: قرض), translated as loan in English, means "to cut", because historically the lender cut off part of his or her property to give to the borrower as a loan. The word hasan is derived from Ihsan (Arabic: احسان), which is translated as splendid or beautiful.

== Scriptural basis ==
The word qardh appears in the Qur'an in six verses: Q2:245, Q5:12, Q57:11, Q57:18, Q64:17, Q73:20. In every verse it is used as part of the phrase qardh al-hasan, and always in reference to a loan to Allah rather than other human beings.

One example is

If you loan to Allah, a beautiful loan [tuqridu llaha qard hasan], He will double it to your (credit), and He will grant you Forgiveness ..(Qur’an 64(al-Tagabun):16–17.)

Qardh also appears in numerous hadith. In contrast to use in the Quran, none of the hadith in the collections of Bukhari, Muslim, Abu Dawud, Nasa'i, Ibn Majah, Tirmidhi, Muwatta, Musnad Ahmad, or Darimi contain the phrase qardh al-hasan. All use qardh without any qualifier.

== Concept ==
The concept of Qardh al-hasan is to assist the poor or needy by offering a loan without any interest. The Quran states that such a loan is beautiful and admirable because the borrower of such a loan is God; not the person receiving the money. According to the verses of Quran, God admires people who pay their wealth for servants of God by using this statement "loan to God", while this wealth is provided for people by God.

A different and non-orthodox interpretation of the Quran's verses on qardh al-hasan (by M.O Farooq) is that the context of the verses does not "seem to have anything to do with qardh in general as business transactions in this world", but instead involves "the symbolic transaction between Allah and the believers". In these sorts of transactions believers can only give Allah loans, not gifts, because "Whatever we offer to Allah is ... treated as loan", since it is always returned, "doubled or even more". In contradiction to orthodox religious legal teachings that the Quranic verses prohibit Muslims from charging interest on business loans, Farooq notes that the verses "specify no detail whatsoever in regard to conditions or limitations, including whether qardh or qardh al-hasan must be without excess. On the contrary, qardh al-hasan, as a contract with God, consistently specifies an excess," (as the Quran talks of doubling the qardh hasan).

== In Islamic banking and finance ==
Qardh al-hasan contracts between Islamic banks and borrowers state that the borrower only has to pay back the amount borrowed, although the borrower can pay back extra money as thanks. Loans such as this are used as an attempt to alleviate poverty and create economic growth. Also the Quran has introduced it as an outstanding element such as sadaqah, zakat and waqf, that is a necessary concept to provide the welfare of society.

Qardh al-hasan supports the main principle of brotherhood. Also there are benefits such as the aid of the poor, establishing a strengthened relationship between poor and rich, the just distribution of national income between all citizens, removing caste differences and unemployment, and being an act with great reward at resurrection day.

In practice, the concept has proven difficult to successfully implement, due to a lack of a mechanism for identifying and monitoring proper use and due to competition with conventional banks.

== See also ==
- Verse of Loan
- Alms
- Khums
- Tzedakah (Judaism)
