= Nisab =

Islamic wealth threshold after which Muslims give to charity

In Sharia (Islamic Law) niṣāb (نِصاب) is the minimum amount of wealth that a Muslim must have before being obliged to give zakat. Zakat is determined based on the amount of wealth acquired; the greater one's assets, the greater the zakat value. Unlike taxable income in secular states, niṣāb is not subject to special exemptions.

== Niṣāb of gold and silver ==
The value of the niṣāb was originally set at 20 dinār or 200 dirham. The dinār is a gold coin weighing one mithqal (4.25 grams) and the dirham is a silver coin weighing 0.7 mithqal (2.975 grams). The relation of 20 dinār and 200 dirham reflects the contemporary exchange value between the dinār and the dirham of 1 to 10 in the early days of Islam. Over time, the exchange rate between gold and silver has shifted, so 20 dinār has become more expensive in market value than 200 dirham. Despite this, the definition of niṣāb has not been altered throughout Islamic history. Both values are accepted in Shariah, and so one can choose to pay zakat if his wealth reached the value of either of them.

The niṣāb is applicable to the cumulative stock of dinār, dirham and any other zakatable valuables, such as merchandise that has been in store for at least one year. As long as the total value of the zakatable valuables exceeds the value of the niṣāb, zakat must be paid.

Some modern scholars have accepted that since dinārs and dirhams are no longer readily available the best solution is to calculate the niṣāb using a mithqal of pure gold as a reference. Although this is not an exact calculation it is considered a valid approximation given current circumstances.

=== Modern interpretation ===
The nisab of gold and silver has been interpreted to extend to modern currencies, and the modern value of the nisab is determined each year using the gold and silver exchange rates.

Another modern problem regarding nisab is whether to use the value of gold (dinar) or silver (dirham). To overcome this problem, most contemporary jurists follow one of two approaches:

1. Use gold as an evaluation reference. This is rationalized by the fact that gold is the origin of modern currency, and is considered more precious than silver.
2. Use whichever satisfies best the interests of the poor.

== Niṣāb for livestock ==
The niṣāb for the three zakatable livestock is as follows:

- Cattle (including buffalo, bison, yaks, etc.): thirty animals
- Sheep and goats: forty animals
- Camels: five animals

The Hanafi school is unique in extending zakat to horses under certain conditions. When it is applicable, there is no nisab and one mithqal is to be paid for each horse.

Someone who owns fewer animals than the above nisab is not obliged to pay zakat. Also, the nisab of one kind of animals is not to be mixed with another. For example, having twenty cows and thirty goats would be considered below the nisab as it does not reach the threshold of 30 cows and 40 goats.

== Niṣāb for agricultural products ==
There is consensus among Muslim jurists that zakat is applicable to dates, grapes, wheat and barley. According to the majority opinion, zakat is also applicable to staples which could be stored like: corn, rice, lentils, dry peas and dry beans, while it is not applicable to fruits and vegetables like cucumbers, zucchini, onions, oranges and apricots. The Hanafi school applies zakat on all agricultural produce according to the opinion of Imam Abu Hanifa. According to Imam Abu Yusuf and Muhamad bin Al Hasan, it only applies to plants whose produce can last (through storage) for a year.

When zakat applies to a plant, the nisab is five Wasaq. Each wasaq is valued as sixty Sa'. Contemporary equivalency of Sa' according to one approximation is 2.03 liters. Therefore, the total nisab for agricultural produce is 609.84 kg.
