= Hamman Yaji =

Emir of Madagali (1863–1929)

- Born: Muhammad Yaji c. 1863; Madagali, Adamawa Emirate
- Died: 1929 (aged 65–66); Sokoto, Colonial Nigeria
- Era: Kamerun
- Known for: Raiding, slave trading
- Notable work: Diary
- Title: Emir
- Term: 1902–1927
- Movement: Mahdism
- Father: Ardo Bakari Njidda

Muhammad Hamman Yaji (c.1863–1929) was Emir of Madagali, Nigeria, part of the Adamawa Emirate. He is known for his personal diary which records daily life and activities from 1912 to 1927 as a Fulbe raider and slave trader near the border of present-day Adamawa State, Nigeria, and Mayo-Tsanaga, Far North Region, Cameroon. Over a nine-year period, Yaji reportedly carried out over one hundred raids, rustling much livestock, enslaving some 2,016 captives, and killing at least two hundred men, one hundred and sixty-eight of whom he notes specifically.

Written in Arabic and translated into English by a British colonial official, his diary provides a rare local perspective on early 20th century sub-Saharan daily life under colonial rule.

== Contemporary culture ==
Researchers and locals have noted numerous parallels between the life and actions of Yaji and the former leader of jihadist group Boko Haram, Abubakar Shekau, both of whom have acquired "an almost mythical aura in the local imagination."

== See also ==
- Muḥammad Bello (caliph)
- Akinpelu Obisesan (colonial Nigeria diarist)
