= Harmala =

Harmala could refer to:

- Peganum harmala, plant species

- Harmala alkaloids, family of substances found within the plant species

- Harmala, Idlib, Syria, a village
- Al-Nabigha bint Harmala (fl. 600s CE), early Muslim
- Harmala ibn Kahil (fl. 680 CE), early Muslim archer
