= Fasting in Islam =

Fasting regulated by Islamic jurisprudence

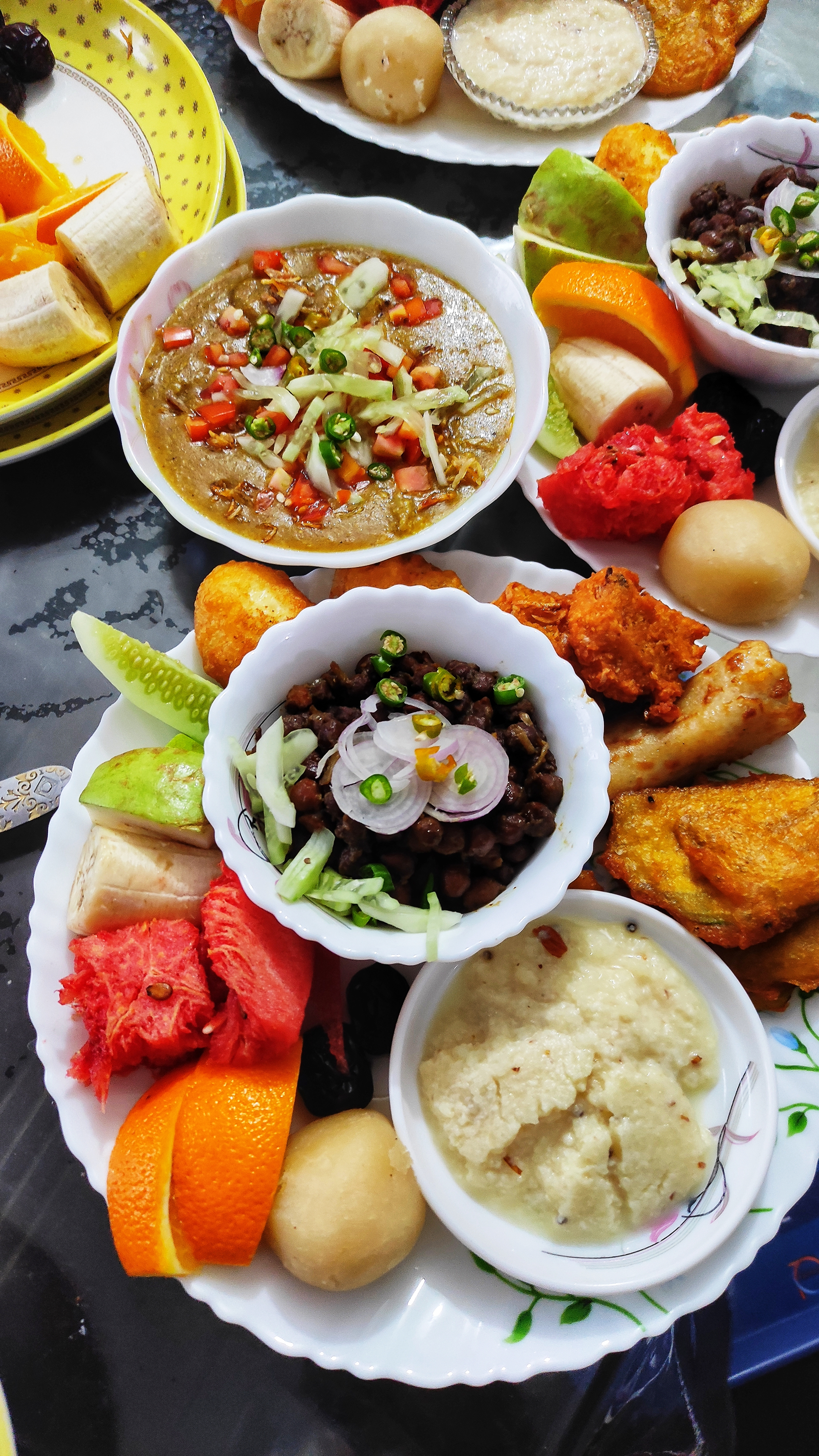
Iftar, a meal consumed to break fast. It is a sunnah to break fast with dates.

In Islam, fasting (called ṣawm in Arabic: صَوم [sˤɑwm], or ṣiyām صيام [sˤɪˈjæːm]) is the practice of abstaining from food, drink, sexual activity, and anything that substitutes food and drink. During the holy month of Ramadan, fasting is observed between dawn and sunset when the prayer call of the dawn prayer and the sunset prayer is called. Ramadan is the ninth month of the Muslim lunar calendar and fasting is a requirement for able Muslims as it is the fourth of the five pillars of Islam.

Fasting during Ramadan is a way for Muslims to develop self-control, piety, and compassion for those in need. The fast is observed every day of Ramadan unless a person falls under exemptions such as illness, travel, pregnancy, or other health conditions.

== Origins ==
Religious fasting is not a uniquely Muslim practice; it has been practiced for centuries by religions such as Christianity, Confucianism, Hinduism, Judaism, and Taoism, among others. It is stated in the Quran that Allah says:

O you who believe, fasting is prescribed for you as it was prescribed for those before you, that you may develop God-consciousness.

— Quran 2:183

Some cultures in North America fasted to serve as penance for sin and avert catastrophes. The official practices of the Inca Empire and many indigenous peoples of Mexico observed fasts to appease their gods. Former nations such as Assyrians and Babylonians observed fasting as a form of penance. Jews observe fasting as a form of purification and penitence on the Day of Atonement or Yom Kippur annually.

Early Christians associated fasting with purification and penitence in the first two centuries. The Christian church made fasting a voluntary preparation for receiving the sacraments of adult baptism and Holy Communion and for the ordination of priests. Later, fasting became mandatory and other days were added. The Lenten fast was expanded in the 6th century to 40 days where one meal was allowed each day. According to historian Philip Jenkins, Ramadan was inspired by "the strict Lenten discipline of the Syrian Churches", a postulation corroborated by other scholars, such as the theologian Paul-Gordon Chandler. Fasting was retained by most Protestant churches and was made optional in some cases after the Reformation. However, stricter Protestants condemned both the festivals of the church and their traditional fasts. Roman Catholics fast on Ash Wednesday and Good Friday; their fast may involve partial abstinence from food and drink or total abstinence.

== In the Quran ==
In the Quran, the practice of fasting is mentioned. In verse 2:183, the Quran expresses situations in which a Muslim is allowed to abstain from fasting and introduces alternative solutions such as feeding needy people. Also, it is emphasized in verse 2:183–185 that it is not necessary for people who are traveling or sick to be fasting, and can be postponed until "another equal number of days." According to verse 5:95, among other things, fasting may be used to make up for certain sins, such as sacrificing an animal during a state of ihram. Verse 2:185 also states that the Quran was revealed in the month of Ramadan. Another verse, 97:1, states that it was revealed "on the Night of Power," where Muslims observe in one of the last 10 nights of Ramadan.

O ye who believe! Fasting is prescribed for you, even as it was prescribed for those before you, that ye may ward off (evil); (Fast) a certain number of days; and (for) him who is sick among you, or on a journey, (the same) number of other days; and for those who can afford it there is a ransom: the feeding of a man in need – but whoso doeth good of his own accord, it is better for him: and that ye fast is better for you if ye did but know – The month of Ramadan in which was revealed the Qur'an, a guidance for mankind, and clear proofs of the guidance, and the Criterion (of right and wrong). And whosoever of you is present, let him fast the month, and whosoever of you is sick or on a journey, (let him fast the same) a number of other days. [...] It is made lawful for you to go in unto your wives on the night of the fast. [...] So hold intercourse with them and seek that which God hath ordained for you, and eat and drink until the white thread becometh distinct to you from the black thread of the dawn. Then strictly observe the fast till nightfall; and touch them not when at devotions in the mosques. These are the limits imposed by God, so approach them not. Thus God expoundeth His revelation to mankind that they may ward off (evil).

— Quran 2:183-187

Perform the pilgrimage and the visit for God. And if ye are prevented, then send such gifts as can be obtained with ease, and shave not your heads until the gifts have reached their destination. And whoever among you is sick or hath an ailment of the head must pay a ransom of fasting or almsgiving or offering. And if ye are in safety, then whosoever contenteth himself with the visit for the pilgrimage (shall give) such gifts as can be had with ease. And whosoever cannot find (such gifts), then a fast of three days while on the pilgrimage, and of seven when ye have returned that is, ten in all. That is for him whoso folk are not present at the Inviolable Place of Worship. Observe your duty to God, and know that God is severe in punishment.

— Quran 2:196

O ye who believe! Kill no wild game while ye are on the pilgrimage. Whoso of you killeth it of set purpose he shall pay its forfeit in the equivalent of that which he hath killed, of domestic animals, the judge to be two men among you known for justice, (the forfeit) to be brought as an offering to the Ka'bah; or, for expiation, he shall feed poor persons, or the equivalent thereof in fasting, that he may taste the evil consequences of his deed. God forgiveth whatever (of this kind) may have happened in the past, but whoso relapseth, God will take retribution from him. God is Mighty, Able to Requite (the wrong).

— Quran 5:95

Such of you as put away your wives (by saying they are as their mothers) They are not their mothers; none are their mothers except those who gave them birth—they indeed utter an ill word and a lie. And lo! God is Forgiving, Merciful. Those who put away their wives (by saying they are as their mothers) and afterward would go back on that which they have said; (the penalty) in that case (is) the freeing of a slave before they touch one another. Unto this, ye are exhorted, and God is informed of what ye do. And he who findeth not (the wherewithal), let him fast for two successive months before they touch one another; and for him who is unable to do so (the penance is) the feeding of sixty needy ones. This, that ye may put trust in God and His messenger. Such are the limits (imposed by God); and for disbelievers is a painful doom.

— Quran 58:2-4

== Definition ==
Fasting is primarily an exercise of devotion to willingly renounce oneself, for a definite period of time, from all bodily appetites in order to form spiritual discipline and self-control. Muslims are prohibited from eating or drinking from dawn (fajr) to sunset (maghrib) when the adhan is called. It is considered time to begin fasting when a person standing outside can tell a white thread from a black thread, i.e. the light of the dawn and the darkness of the night.

== Conditions ==
=== Intention (niyyah) ===
"The intention (niyyah) means resolving to fast. It is essential to have the intention the night before, night by night, in Ramadan." For fasting, making the intention to fast is necessary.

=== General conditions ===
Throughout the duration of the fast itself, Muslims will abstain from certain provisions that the Quran has otherwise allowed; namely eating, drinking, and sexual intercourse. This is in addition to the standard obligation already observed by Muslims of avoiding that which is not permissible under Quranic or shari'a law (e.g. ignorant and indecent speech, arguing and fighting and lustful thoughts). Without observing this standard obligation, the sawm is rendered useless and is seen simply as an act of starvation. Fasting should be a motive to be more benevolent to fellow creatures. Charity to the poor and needy in this month is one of the most rewardable worships.

If one is sick, pregnant, menstruating, nursing, or traveling, one is considered exempt from fasting. Any fasts broken or missed due to sickness, pregnancy, menstruation, nursing, or traveling are made up whenever the person is able before the next month of Ramadan. According to the Quran, for all other cases, not fasting is only permitted when the act is potentially dangerous to one's health – for example, those who are sick, elderly, or on a journey, and women who are menstruating, pregnant, or nursing are permitted to break the fast, but this must be made up by paying a fidyah, which is essentially the iftar and suhur for a fasting person who requires such financial help.

Muslim scholars have stated that observing the fast is forbidden for menstruating women. However, when a woman's period has ceased, she must bathe and continue fasting. Any fasts broken or missed due to menstruation must be made up whenever she can before the next month of Ramadan (not all Muslims believe missing fasts due to menstruation must be made up). Women must fast at times when not menstruating, as the Quran indicates that all religious duties are ordained for both men and women. The reason for this is because the Quran refers to menstruation as "Say: It is a discomfort (Menstruation)". According to Nouman Ali Khan, an Islamic speaker in the United States, the reason for this prohibition is because of the pain associated with it. A Muslim woman may still do dhikr (remembrance of Allah) and make dua (supplication to Allah) during this time. (Note: Qur'an, 2:222)

Fasting is obligatory for a person if they fulfill five conditions:

1. They are Muslims;
2. They are accountable (past the age of puberty);
3. They are able to fast;
4. They are settled (not traveling);
5. There are no impediments to fasting such as sickness, extreme pain from injury, breastfeeding, or pregnancy.

=== Breaking the fast and the consequences ===
During Ramadan, if one unintentionally breaks the fast by eating or drinking, then they must continue fasting for the rest of the day and the fast remains valid. Those who intentionally break the fast by eating or drinking, they have to make up for that and also repent. For breaking fast by having sexual intercourse, the consequences are:

1. Free a slave, and if that is not possible,
2. Fast for two consecutive Hijri (moon) months, and if that is not possible,
3. Feed or clothe sixty people in need.

During voluntary fasts, if one unintentionally breaks the fast then they may continue for the rest of the day and the fast remains valid. If one intentionally breaks the fast there is no sin on them, because it is only voluntary.

=== Breaking oaths and consequences ===
If an oath is given and circumstances dictate that it must be broken (or if the one giving the oath deliberately breaks it), one must offer expiation (kaffara) by freeing a slave, or feeding or clothing ten needy people with the average of what is needed for one's own family, or if neither of those can be done then a fast for three days is prescribed instead.

=== Beginning and ending ===
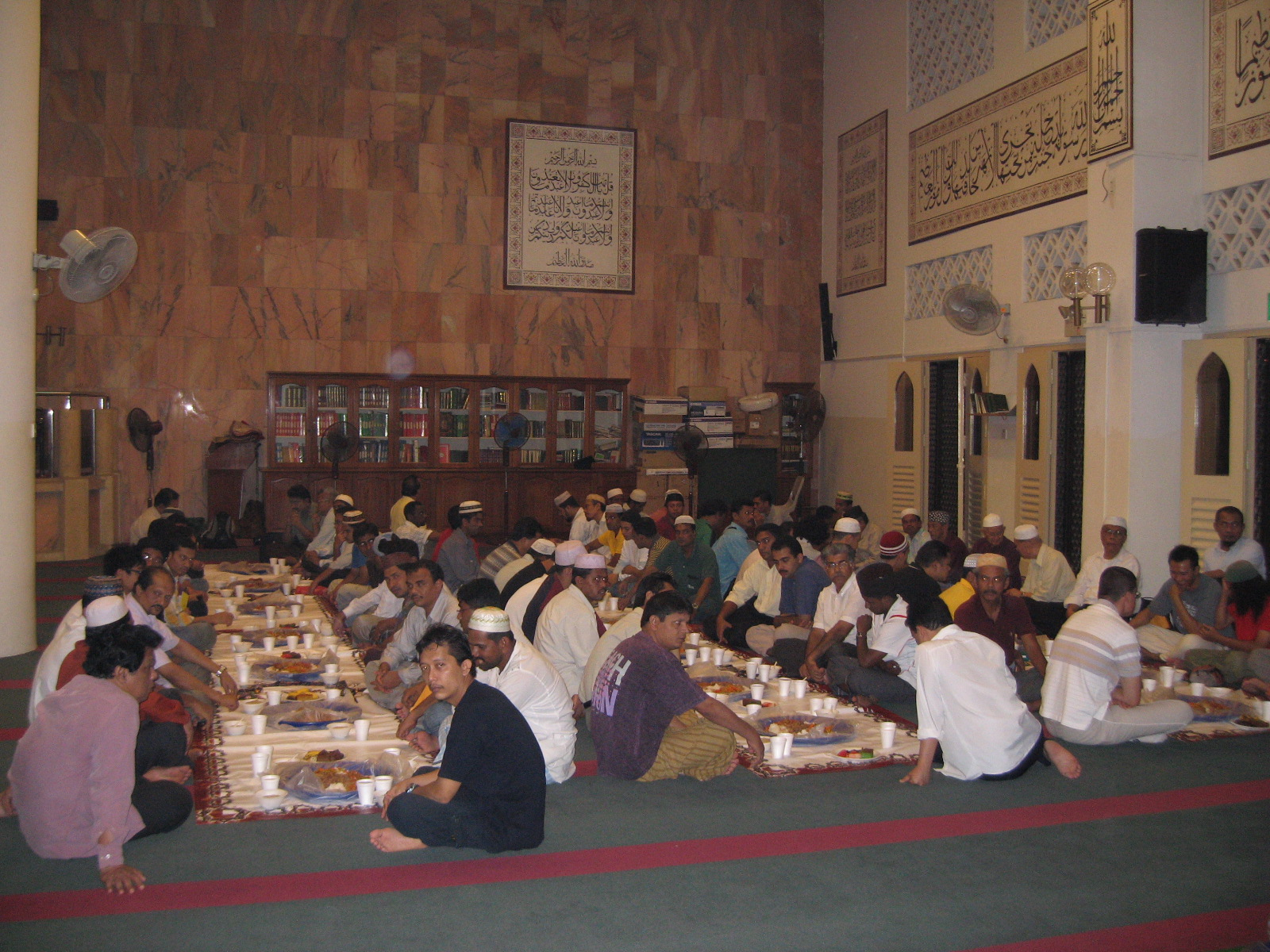
Ending the fast at a mosque

In accordance with traditions handed down from Muhammad, Muslims eat a pre-dawn meal called suhur. All eating and drinking must be finished before the adhan for fajr, the pre-dawn call to prayer. Unlike the zuhr and the maghrib prayer, which have clear astronomical definitions (afternoon and after sunset), there are several definitions used in practice for the timing of "true dawn" (al-fajr al-ṣādiq), as mentioned in the hadith. These range from when the center of the Sun is 12 to 21 degrees below the horizon which equates to about 40 to 60 minutes before civil dawn. There are no restrictions on the morning meal other than those of Islamic dietary laws. After completing the suhur, Muslims recite the fajr prayer. No food or beverage can be taken after suhur. Water can enter the mouth, but not be swallowed, during wudu.

The meal eaten to end the fast is known as iftar. Muslims break the fast with dates and water before the maghrib prayer, after which they might eat a more wholesome meal.

== Spiritual aspect ==
Fasting has been prescribed to all Muslims as a form of religious obligation for overcoming their lust and desires within a reasonable limit so that one can control oneself and prevent becoming a slave to their appetites. The Qur'an states that if humans cannot prevent themselves from desires then they cannot achieve salvation:

As for him who fears to stand before his Lord and restrains himself from low desires, Paradise is surely the abode.

— Quran; 79:40–41)

Muslims abstain from a permissible norm of daily life due to the command of Allah so it strengthens one's self-control and increases consciousness of the Lord. It is not prescribed as a punishment for people or to inflict burdensome practices. It is a moral and spiritual training whose underlying idea is to teach moderation and spiritual discipline so that human temptations do not surpass the moral disciplines implemented in Islam. Furthermore, fasting is mandatory for only a definite period of time and does not promote total renunciation from the appetite of the flesh. Eating, drinking, and sexual intercourse become permissible for a human at the end of the fast. Therefore, Islamic fasting aims at promoting proper limits within its natural bounds.

== Health effects ==
Islamic fasting, as a time-restricted eating habit that inverts the normal human day-night routine for observance, can have deleterious health effects on sleep patterns and general health. Fasting in Ramadan has been shown to alter the sleep patterns and the associated hormone production. However, other medical sources have noted that Ramadan fasting, when practiced properly, can help regulate cholesterol levels, support natural detoxification processes, and improve mood and mental clarity through changes in metabolic and neurochemical activity.

Statistical comparison of thousands of school children, part of whom was born without the month of Ramadan during pregnancy and part of whom where Ramadan coincided with the pregnancy, has revealed lower cognitive capability, and lower growth in adolescence if the mother observed Ramadan fasting during pregnancy. Children whose mothers fasted during Ramadan also have a higher incidence of several chronic diseases, e.g. Type 2 diabetes (see the ruling regarding fasting pregnant women).

Fasting is one of the alternatives proved to reduce the DPP-4 level and activate the dipeptidyl peptidase-4 inhibitors and so, prevent osteoporosis. On the other hand, the circadian rhythm has a direct relationship with osteoporosis. This has been found by the biochemical markers, indicating that fasting at certain hours of the day, especially during those hours of the day which are recommended as part of the Muslim tradition (Islamic fasting), is very effective in reducing the effects of osteoporosis.

The education departments of Berlin and the United Kingdom have tried to discourage students from fasting during Ramadan, as they claim that not eating or drinking can lead to concentration problems and bad grades. Ramadan fasting has also been associated with loss of workplace productivity by 35 to 50%.

Many of the purported health benefits associated with Ramadan fasting only take into account abstinence from food while ignoring the lack of water intake, which can have a harmful impact even in healthy individuals. In many cultures, it is associated with heavy food and water intake during Suhur and Iftar times, which may do more harm than good.

Ramadan fasting is safe for healthy people provided that overall food and water intake is adequate, but those with medical conditions should seek medical advice if they encounter health problems before or during fasting. The fasting period is usually associated with modest weight loss, but weight can return afterward.

A review of the literature by an Iranian group suggested fasting during Ramadan might produce renal injury in patients with moderate (GFR <60 ml/min) or severe kidney disease but was not injurious to renal transplant patients with good function or most stone-forming patients. However, since sick and/or at-risk individuals are exempted from the obligation of fasting, Ramadan fasting may be skipped instead.

Ramadan fasting can be potentially hazardous for pregnant women as it is associated with risks of inducing labor and causing gestational diabetes, although it does not appear to affect the child's weight. it is permissible to not fast if it threatens the woman's or the child's lives, however, in many instances, pregnant women are normal before the development of complications. Thus, it may be advisable for pregnant women to skip fasting and pay fidyah instead (if the women are able to pay; poor people may be exempted fully).

If one is at risk of dehydration or other medical risks, which may lead to serious consequences, then it is permitted to break one's fast. It has been advised to span the water intake throughout the night (instead of drinking heavily at a single time) and not to overeat upon the breaking of the fast as a solution of the usually reported excessive water and food intake on the sunset (excessive eating and drinking is actually prohibited in Islam). One can break their fast and substitute it on other months or pay fidyah if they are an obvious risk of health concerns, breastfeeding or pregnant (fidyah in this case) or in a work requiring hard physical labor according to Muhammad Abduh.

It is permissible to skip fasting for a healthy person upon obvious risk, even if he has not fallen the risk yet, and the author of Al-Mughni (Ibn Qudamah) stated in his book that some scholars even permitted skipping fast upon very light harm such as toothache or bruises on skin and if a traveling person is permitted to skip fast even if he is able to, then these types of "sickness" should be permitted. This position is said to be held by Bukhari, 'Ata and the Zahiris.

== Days ==
=== Month of Ramadan ===
Fasting in the month of Ramadan is considered Fard. Ibn Qudamah said that there is consensus of the Muslims that fasting is compulsory in the month of Ramadan.

=== Days of oath ===
If someone swears or makes an oath, for example: "If I graduate with a good mark, I will fast for three days for Allah" then common belief dictates that one should fulfil this. This type of fasting is considered obligatory. Breaking such an oath is considered sinful.

=== Days for voluntary fasting ===
Muslims are encouraged, although not obliged, to fast on certain days, such as:

- Mondays and Thursdays.
- Any 6 days in the lunar or "Islamic" month of Shawwal is desirable if possible.
- The White Days, the 13th, 14th, and 15th day of each lunar month (Hijri).
- The Day of Arafah (9th of Dhu'I-Hijja in the Islamic (Hijri) calendar).
- As often as possible in the months of Rajab and Sha'aban before Ramadan.
- First 9 days of Dhu al-Hijjah in the Islamic calendar (but not for any who are performing Hajj (the pilgrimage).
- Tasua (9th day) and Ashura (10th day) of Muharram, for Sunnis only.

=== Days when fasting is forbidden ===
Although fasting is considered a pious act in Islam, there are times when fasting is considered prohibited or discouraged according to the majority of the Sunni scholars:

- Eid al-Adha and three days following it, because Muhammad said "You are not to fast these days. They are days of eating and drinking and remembering Allah", reported by Abu Hurairah.
- Eid al-Fitr
- It is also forbidden to single out Fridays and only fast every Friday, as 'Abdullah b. 'Amr b. al-'As said that he heard Muhammad say "Verily, Friday is an eid (holiday) for you, so do not fast on it unless you fast the day before or after it."
- Fasting every day of the year is considered non-rewarding; Muhammad said: "There is no reward for fasting for the one who perpetually fasts." This Hadith is considered authentic by Sunni scholars.
- Fasting on Ashura for Shi'a Muslims has generally been discouraged or forbidden.

The Quran contains no other prohibition regarding the days of fasting.

== In polar regions ==
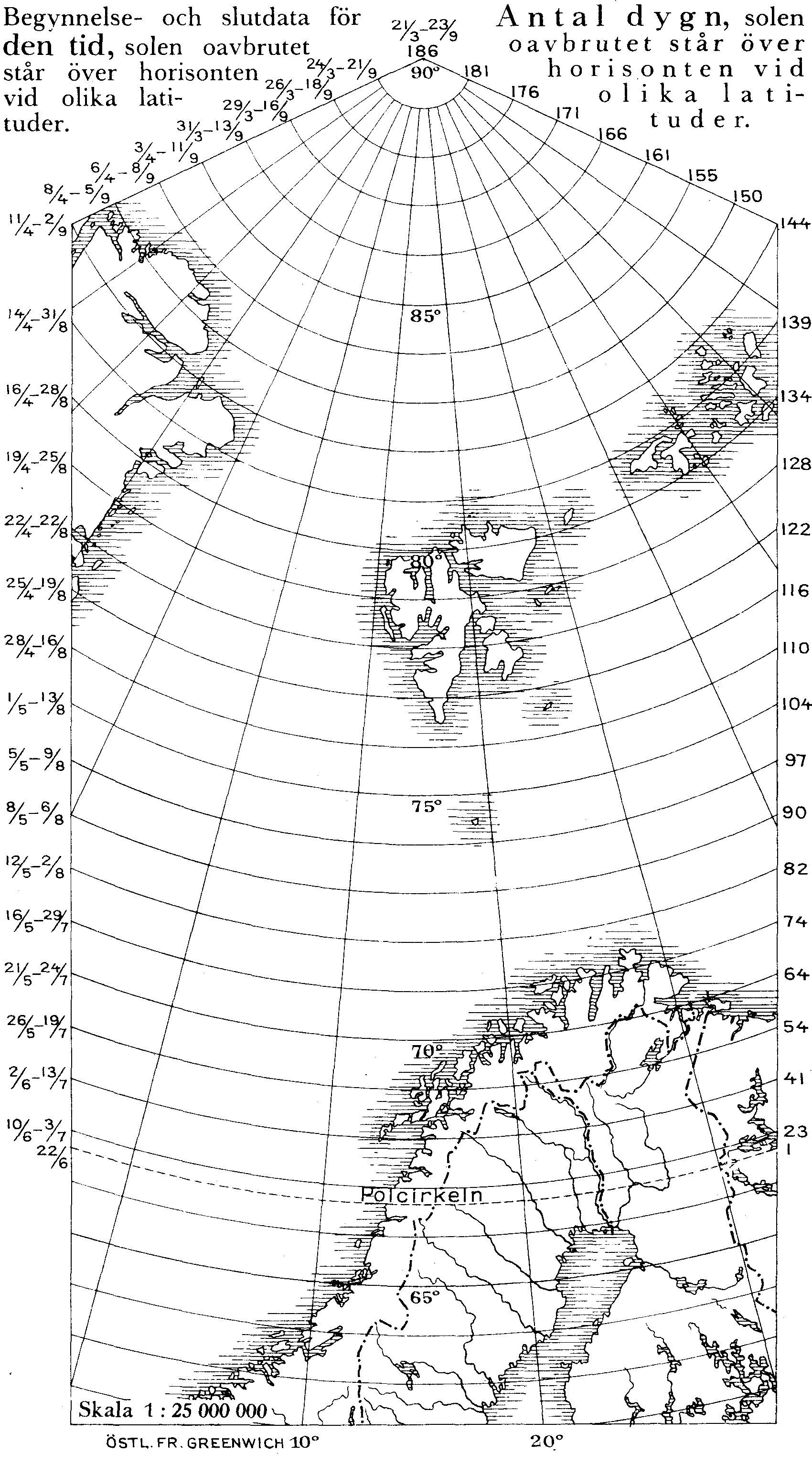
Map showing the dates of midnight sun at various latitudes (left) and the total number of nights

Nothing in the Quran states directly any instruction in the polar regions of Earth and fasting; according to the opinion of the Council of senior scholars in Saudi Arabia. At polar latitudes, June solstices feature the midnight sun and December solstices have polar night. These natural phenomena occur because the Earth's axis tilts toward the Sun in summer and away from the Sun in winter, causing the poles to be exposed to the Sun's rays for six months each nonstop. The reason most of the earliest Muslims did not experience these phenomena during Islam's early days is that they did not live in polar regions but in the subtropics, where the sun can be directly overhead and does set at night.

In the Ma'ariful Qur'an it is said that the Quran states:

(During Ramadan) eat and drink until the white thread of dawn appears to you distinct from its black thread.

— Qur'an, 2:187

This results that fasting is a duty for Muslims only when days and nights exist, otherwise fasting is not necessary.

The Muslims of Svalbard in Norway have to fast only when a night occurs within one 24-hour period. If Ramadan comes in June or December, they may leave fasting and then complete their fasting in the March or September equinox, when days and nights are equalised by the sun in Svalbard. In Islamic law it is called qaḍē.

God intends every facility for you; He does not want to put you in difficulties. (He wants you) to complete the prescribed period, and to glorify Him in that He has guided you, and perchance ye shall be grateful.

— Qur'an, 2:184

== See also ==
- Ancillaries of the Faith
- Fidyah and Kaffara
- The White Days
- Sauma in Mandaeism
