= Al-Kaffarah =

Term in Islamic law

Al-Kaffarah is a term in Islamic law meaning the expiation of sin, or more specifically “to compensate for commissioning a sinful act or what is paid to redress an imbalance that is a kind of penalty or punishment.” Examples of sinful acts include violating Ramadan fasting, violating ihram restrictions in Hajj, or consciously hurting a person or animal. Examples of expiation of them include fasting for two consecutive months, freeing a Muslim slave, paying for food to feed 60 poor people, or slaughtering a goat.

Kaffarah is similar to two other Islamic obligations/punishments: diya and fidyah. Kaffarah resembles diya in that the perpetrator of the sin is often paying something of value in punishment, but unlike diya, the money does not go to the victim as compensation. Kaffarah resembles fidyah in that they both often involve recompense for the breaking of religious obligations, but fidyah compensation is lighter because fidyah only involves situations where a Muslim was unable to fulfill the obligation unintentionally or for reasons beyond their control.

== Etymology ==
The root of Al-Kaffarah is (Arabic: کَفَرَ, trans. kafar), which means covering. In Quran, Kaffarah as a kind of worship is the way that Allah ignores sins and covers them. Kaffarah literally means "a trait that tends to the expiation or atonement of sin". In practice, it means a determined penalty that is done expiation for sin.

== Types ==
Kaffarah is a special sanction to compensate for committing a sin, unintentional murder, or other offense. According to the Quran and Hadith, Kaffarah is classified into the following categories:

=== Unintentional murder and semi-unintentional murder ===
In Islamic law, a person who committed the unintentional murder must release a slave or a fast of two consecutive months and pay Diya unless murder's family forgive him. Kaffara is the expiated treat for crimes while blood money (Diya), as the social function is paid to the relative of the dead, the definition describes the relationship between the offender and dead. (Note: Qur'an, 4:92..."And never is it for a believer to kill a believer except by mistake. And whoever kills a believer by mistake - then the freeing of a believing slave and a compensation payment presented to the deceased's family [is required] unless they give [up their right as] charity. But if the deceased was from a people at war with you and he was a believer - then [only] the freeing of a believing slave; and if he was from a people with whom you have a treaty - then a compensation payment presented to his family and the freeing of a believing slave. And whoever does not find [one or cannot afford to buy one] - then [instead], a fast for two months consecutively, [seeking] acceptance of repentance from Allah. And Allah is ever Knowing and Wise")

=== Fasting ===
Someone breaking a fast, or not following it from its inception, or having sexual intercourse with their spouse during it, without a reason accredited by Sharia is required to pay Kaffarah. (Note: Qur'an, 2:184..."[Fasting for] a limited number of days. So whoever among you is ill or on a journey [during them] - then an equal number of days [are to be made up]. And upon those who are able [to fast, but with hardship] - a ransom [as substitute] of feeding a poor person [each day]. And whoever volunteers excess - it is better for him. But to fast is best for you, if you only knew") The first payment method is to release a slave, and if that is not possible, a person should fast for two successive months, or feed sixty poor people.

=== Oaths ===
If someone breaks an oath, paying Kaffarah is necessary. (Note: Qur'an, 66:2..."Allah has already ordained for you [Muslims] the dissolution of your oaths. And Allah is your protector, and He is the Knowing, the Wise") In this case, Kaffarah could include:

1. Feeding ten poor people
2. Dress up to them (poor people)
3. Releasing a slave
4. Fasting three days (if the person cannot afford any of the above)

=== Hajj ===
Anyone who violates Ihram restrictions in Hajj, (by having sexual intercourse, wearing a sewn dress, killing animals, etc.) must pay Kaffarah. (Note: Qur'an, 2:196..."And complete the Hajj and 'umrah for Allah. But if you are prevented, then [offer] what can be obtained with ease of sacrificial animals. And do not shave your heads until the sacrificial animal has reached its place of slaughter. And whoever among you is ill or has an ailment of the head [making shaving necessary must offer] a ransom of fasting [three days] or charity or sacrifice. And when you are secure, then whoever performs 'umrah [during the Hajj months] followed by Hajj [offers] what can be obtained with ease of sacrificial animals. And whoever cannot find [or afford such an animal] - then a fast of three days during Hajj and of seven when you have returned [home]. Those are ten complete [days]. This is for those whose family is not in the area of al-Masjid al-Haram. And fear Allah and know that Allah is severe in penalty") In this situation, Kaffarah respectively includes:

1. Three days of fasting
2. Feeding sixty people
3. Slaughtering a goat or even carrying out a badnah (carrying seven slaughters)
4. Sadaqah

=== Zihar ===
Zihar was a method of divorce used frequently by pagan Arabs. If someone does Zihar then returns to his wife, (Note: Qur'an, 58:3-4..."And those who pronounce thihar from their wives and then [wish to] go back on what they said - then [there must be] the freeing of a slave before they touch one another. That is what you are admonished thereby; and Allah is Acquainted with what you do. (3) And he who does not find [a slave] - then a fast for two months consecutively before they touch one another; and he who is unable - then the feeding of sixty poor persons. That is for you to believe [completely] in Allah and His Messenger; and those are the limits [set by] Allah. And for the disbelievers is a painful punishment") he must pay Kaffarah. In this situation, Kaffarah includes:

1. Fasting for two successive months
2. Feeding sixty poor people

== See also ==
- Fidyah and kaffara
- Islamic economics
- Islamic socialism
- Islamic taxes
- Jizya
- Khums
- Kharaj
- Qard al-Hassan
- Sadaqah
- Zakat Council (Pakistan)
