= Ali al-Asghar ibn Husayn =

Great-grandson of the Islamic prophet Muhammad, killed in the Battle of Karbala

Ali al-Asghar عَلِيّ ٱلْأَصْغَر
- A 1978 Iranian painting showing Husayn lifts the body of his six month old child Ali al-Asghar, shot by an arrow from Yazid’s armies on the day of Ashura.
- Title: Ali al-Asghar (عَلِيّ ٱلْأَصْغَر)

Personal life
- Died: 10 Muharram 61 AH (10 October 680 CE) Karbala, Iraq
- Resting place: Imam Husayn Shrine, Karbala
- Parents: Al-Husayn ibn ‘Ali (father); Rubab bint Imra’ al-Qays (mother)

Religious life
- Religion: Islam
- Denomination: Shia

Abd-Allah ibn al-Husayn (Arabic: عَبْد ٱللَّٰه ٱبْن ٱلْحُسَيْن), also known as Ali al-Asghar (Arabic: عَلِيّ ٱلْأَصْغَر, lit. 'Ali, the youngest'), was a great-grandson of the Islamic prophet Muhammad and the youngest son of Husayn. An infant, he was killed in the Battle of Karbala in 680, alongside his father, family members, and supporters, all of whom were brutally massacred by the forces of the Umayyad caliph Yazid. Ali al-Asghar is commemorated in Shia Islam as the quintessential symbol of the innocent victim.

== Birth and background ==
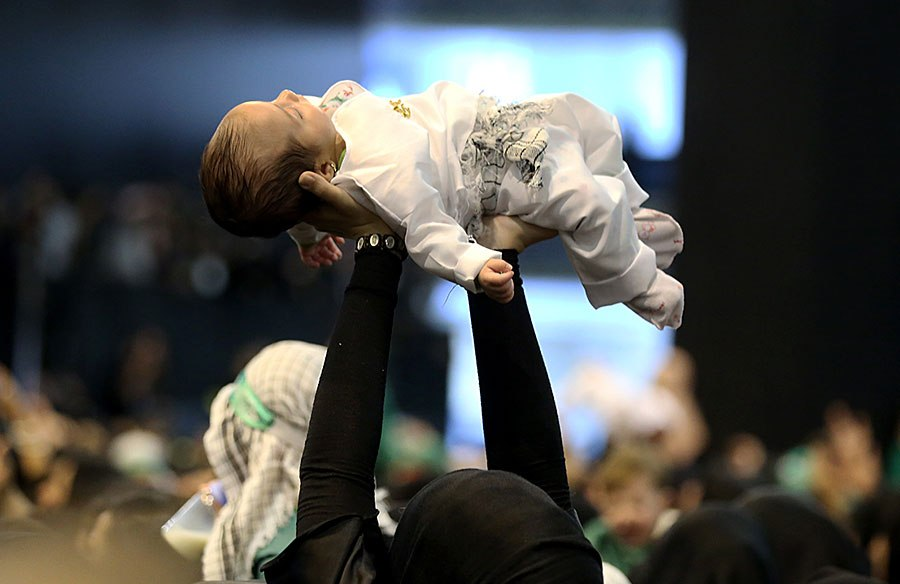
An act of commemoration for Ali al-Asghar

Abd-Allah was the youngest son of Husayn ibn Ali, the third Shia Imam. His mother Rubab was the first wife of Husayn and the daughter of Imra' al-Qais ibn Adi, a chief of the Banu Kalb tribe. Husayn's kunya, Abu Abd-Allah, probably refers to this son. His birthdate is not known with certainty, but he was a young child in the Battle of Karbala in 680 CE, likely an infant. Late Shia sources commonly refer to Abd-Allah as Ali al-Asghar (lit. 'Ali, the junior'), as early as the Twelver jurist Ibn Shahrashub (d. 1192) in his biographical Manaqib ale Abi Talib. This might be a reference to the tradition in which Husayn expressed his wish to name all his sons Ali after his father Ali ibn Abi Talib, the first Shia Imam and the fourth caliph (r. 656–661). Husayn indeed had two more sons named Ali, namely, Ali al-Akbar and Ali ibn al-Husayn Zayn al-Abidin. There are further confusions as some Shia and Sunni authors variously refer to one of these two sons as Ali al-Asghar. Among them are the polymath Abu Hanifa Dinawari (d. 895) and the fifteenth-century historian Hasan ibn Muhammad Qomi, the author of Tarikh-i Qom.

== Battle of Karbala and death (680) ==
Husayn denounced the accession of the Umayyad caliph Yazid ibn Mu'awiya in 680. When pressed by Yazid's agents to pledge his allegiance, Husayn first fled from his hometown of Medina to Mecca and later set off for Kufa in Iraq, accompanied by his family and a small group of supporters. Among them was Rubab, according to the Sunni historian Ibn al-Athir (d. 1232-3) in The Complete History. With her were her two children, Sakina and Abd-Allah, who was at the time a young child, likely an infant, as reported by the early historian Abu al-Faraj al-Isfahani (d. 967) in his biographical Maqatil al-Talibiyyin, and by the Shia-leaning historian al-Ya'qubi (d. 897-8) in his Tarikh al-Ya'qubi. The tenth-century historian Abu Ali Bal'ami and the Twelver jurist Ibn Tawus (d. 1266) report the age of Abd-Allah as one year and six months, respectively. That he was an infant is the prevalent Shia view.

=== Death ===
The small caravan of Husayn was intercepted and massacred on 10 Muharram 61 AH (10 October 680) in Karbala, near Kufa, by the Umayyad forces who first surrounded them for some days and cut off their access to the nearby river Euphrates. Abd-Allah was also killed during the battle by an arrow, though the manner of his death is uncertain. The Twelver theologian al-Mufid (d. 1022) writes in his biographical Kitab al-Irshad that Abd-Allah was killed in his father's arms by an arrow, as Husayn was preparing to leave his family and enter the battlefield. The arrow also pierced Husayn's arm, adds the Hanafi scholar Husayn Kashefi (d. 910) in his martyrology Rawzat al-shuhada. Husayn then dug a small grave with his sword and buried the child, according to the Shia author al-Muwaffaq al-Kharazmi of the biographical Maqtal al-Husayn. The account in Rawzat al-shuhada is that Husayn brought Abd-Allah to the battlefield, held him up, and implored the enemy to have mercy on the thirsty children and allow them some water. The response was an arrow that killed Abd-Allah. Alternatively, Tarikh-i Qom reports that Abd-Allah was killed in his mother's arms, while the Sunni historian al-Tabari (d. 923) records that a badly wounded and surrounded Husayn had failed to reach the Euphrates when a man from the Banu Asad tribe shot and killed Abd-Allah in his father's lap. The man who killed Abd-Allah ibn Husayn is identified as Hani ibn Thubait al-Hadrami by al-Tabari, who adds that Harmala ibn Kahil killed Abd-Allah ibn Hasan, Husayn's nephew. In contrast, some others report that it was Harmala who killed Abd-Allah ibn Husayn. These authors include al-Mufid, Husayn Kashefi, and the Sunni historian al-Baladhuri (d. 892) in his Genealogies of the Nobles.

=== Aftermath ===
The battle ended when Husayn was beheaded, whereupon the Umayyad soldiers pillaged his camp, and severed the heads of Husayn and his fallen companions, which they then raised on spears for display. The women and children were then taken captive and marched to Kufa and later the capital Damascus. The captives were paraded in the streets of Damascus, and then imprisoned for an unknown period of time. They were eventually freed by Yazid and returned to Medina.

== Commemoration ==
Shia Muslims commemorate the events of Karbala throughout the months of Muharram and Safar, particularly during the first ten days of Muharram, culminating on the tenth (Ashura) with processions in major Shia cities. The main component of these ritual ceremonies (maj'alis, sing. majlis) is the narration of the stories of Karbala, intended to raise sympathy and move the audience to tears. In the Shia commemoration of Karbala, Abd-Allah is represented as an innocent child who suffered unbearable thirst, described as "the quintessence of symbol of the innocent victim." His death carries perhaps the heaviest emotional weight for the Shia mourners, and replicas of his empty cradle are often present in mourning processions. Abd-Allah is also heavily featured in the verbal narratives of the ritual practices (rawza khani) and a complete majlis is sometimes dedicated to him. As an act of commemoration, Iranian mourners often dress their baby boys in white jacket and green headband, which is how Abd-Allah is often represented in religious paintings.

== See also ==
- Celebration of Husaynid infants
- Ali al-Akbar ibn Husayn
- Battle of Karbala
