= Hosseini infancy conference =

The Hosseini infancy conference (Persian: همایش شیرخوارگان حسینی hamâyeš-e širxwargan-e Hōsēynī) is a mourning custom of the Day of Ashura. It is held on the first Friday of Muharram in the Islamic calendar to commemorate the memory of Ali al-Asghar ibn Husayn, the six-month-old baby boy of Husayn ibn Ali and Umm Rubab, who was the youngest person killed in the Battle of Karbala.

== Aim of the conference ==
According to a report by Islamic Republic of Iran Broadcasting, the aim of holding the Hosseini infancy conference is to promote the teaching of Ashura.

== Time and place ==
The first conference was held in 2003, and after that mourners have congregated every year on the first Friday of Muharram throughout Iran and in 43 other countries including Iraq, Pakistan, Bahrain, India, and Turkey.

The 2018 Hosseini infancy conference is being held in Musalla, Tehran and other cities such as Mashhad, Alborz, Khorramabad, and Qom in the Jamkaran mosque.

== Clothing ==
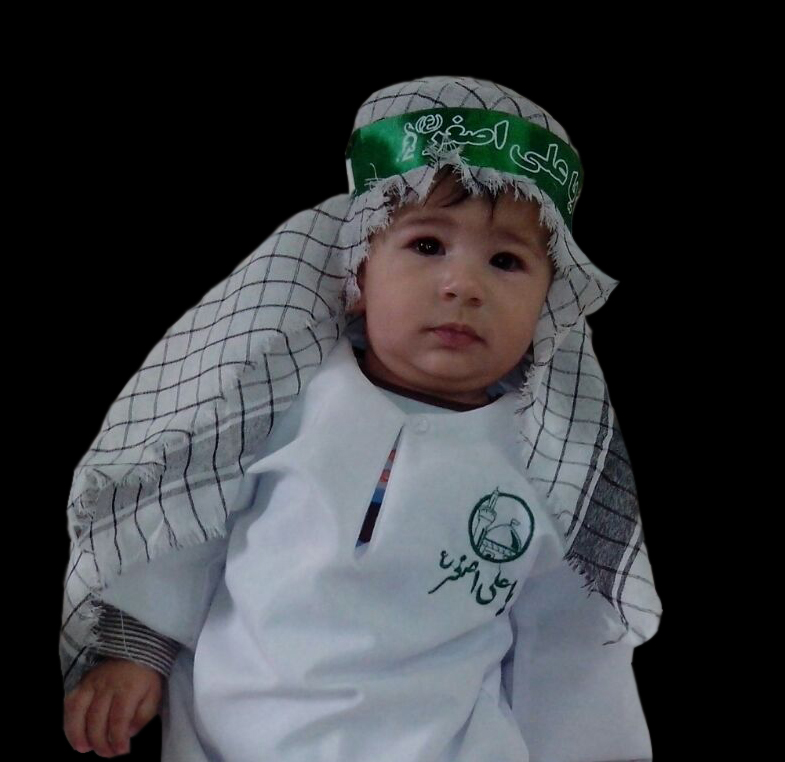
A baby in the Hosseini infancy conference

At the conference, mothers dress their babies in special green and white clothes, which are said to resemble the clothing of Ali al-Asghar ibn Husayn. Babies also wear a headband with the name of Ali al-Asghar ibn Husayn written on it.

== Places ==
Each first Friday of Muharram in Iran and other countries, mothers and their babies receive Alavi's green gown and scarf and the forehead band of Ya Sahebazzaman upon their arrival in the conference. They will then mourn Ali Asghar's infant death at Karbala. In 2003, the first ceremony was held in Tehran. Other cities of Iran and other countries have been holding the ceremony ever since.

- 2003: Tehran (the first year)
- 2004: Tehran, Mashhad, Qom, Karbala, Najaf, Bahrain
- 2005: 54 cities of Iran and 21 cities elsewhere
- 2006: 112 cities of Iran and 30 cities elsewhere
- 2007: 213 cities of Iran and 43 cities elsewhere
- 2008: 400 cities of Iran and 59 cities elsewhere
- 2009: 550 cities of Iran and 70 cities elsewhere
- 2010: 970 points of Iran and 87 cities elsewhere
- 2011: 1550 points of Iran and 110 cities in the five continents
- 2011: 2000 points of Iran and 220 cities in the five continents
- 2012: 2050 points of Iran and 222 cities in the five continents
- 2013: 2075 points of Iran and 225 cities in the five continents
- 2014: 2500 points of Iran and 230 cities in the five continents

=== Countries ===
The ceremony is held in these countries:

- Iraq
- Bahrain
- Turkey
- Lebanon
- Saudi Arabia
- Pakistan
- India
- Afghanistan
- United Arab Emirates
- Oman
- Yemen
- Sudan
- England
- Germany
- Italy

== In the Gregorian calendar ==
The following table shows the predicted dates and announced dates based on the calendar of Iran, which celebrated the conference for the first time.

Dates of first Friday in Muharram
Solar Hijri year	Gregorian date
1396	22 September 2017
1397	14 September 2018
1398	6 September 2019

== Gallery ==
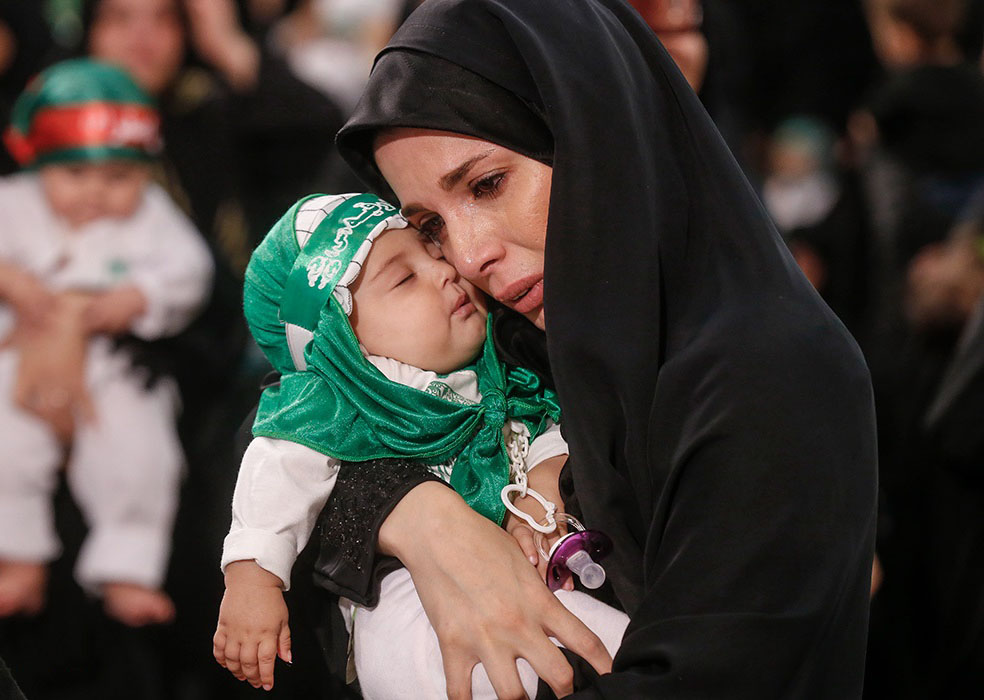

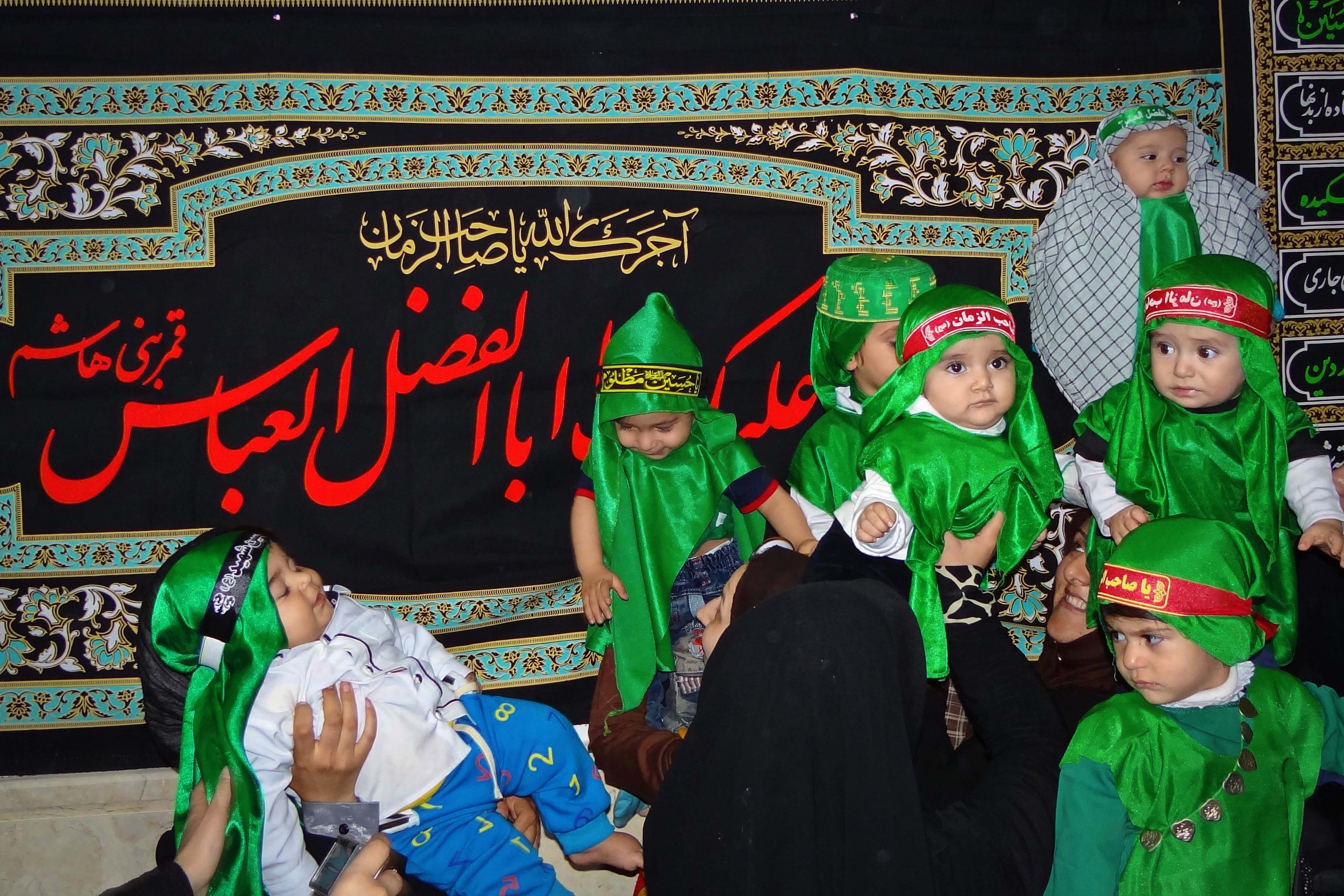

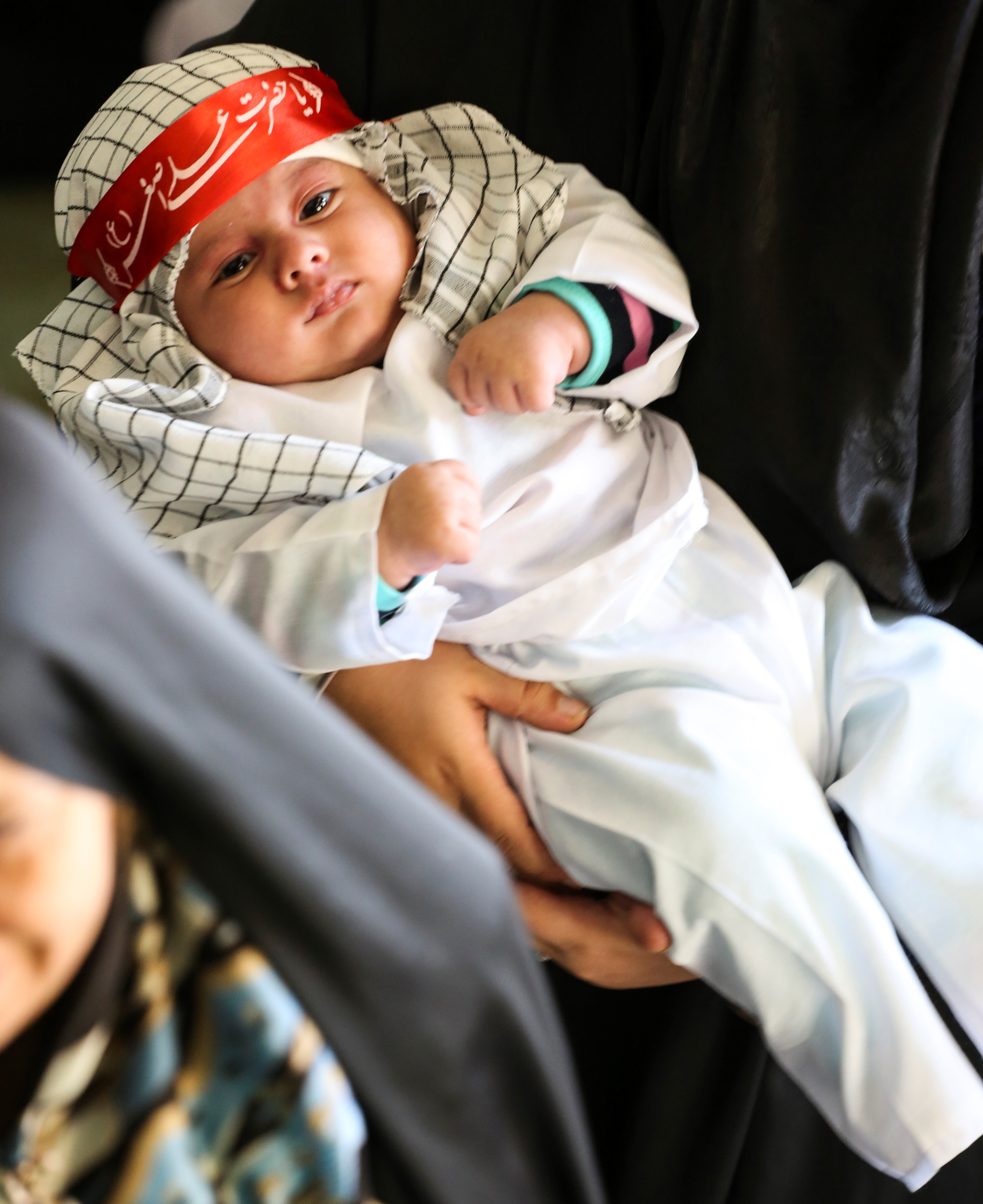

== See also ==
- List of casualties in Husayn's army at the Battle of Karbala
- Ayyam al-Beed
- Ehya night
