= Q58 =

Q58 may refer to:

- Q58 (New York City bus)
- Al-Mujadila, a surah of the Quran
- French submarine Fructidor
- Q58, former branding of KQCA
