= The White Days =

Special virtuous days of Muslim calendar

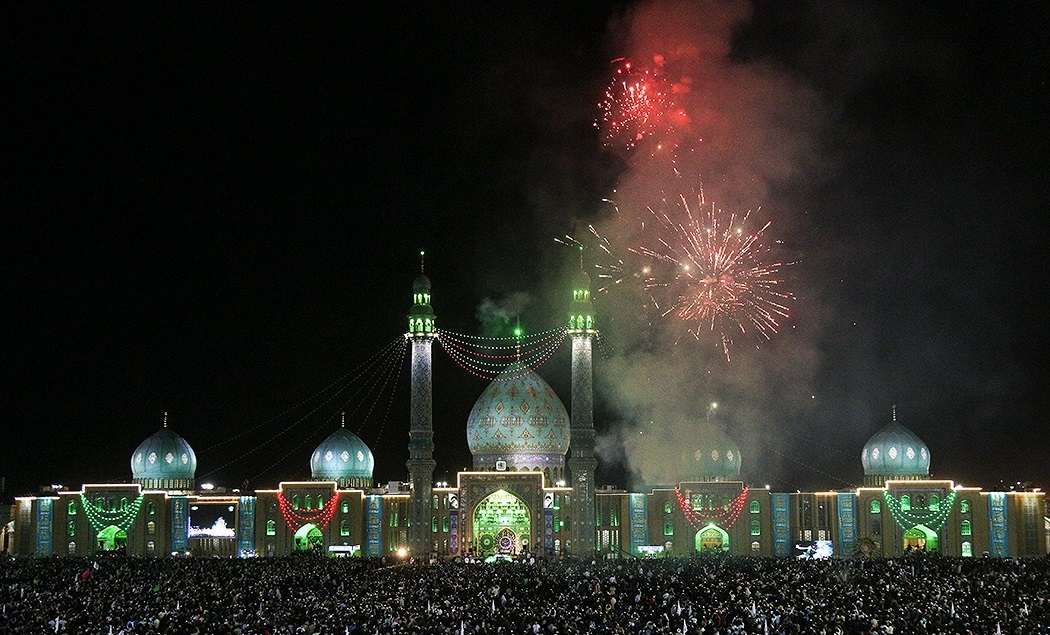
The White Days of certain months such as Rajab, Sha'ban, and Ramadan, are considered more important, and are days of celebration (according to the shi'a sect).

The White Days or Ayyām al-Bīḍ (Arabic: ایّام البیض) are the 13th, 14th and 15th days of each month in the Islamic calendar, on which voluntary fasting is recommended in Islamic tradition. Muslims believe that the white days of the lunar months of Rajab, Sha'ban and Ramadan are very virtuous.

== Etymology ==
This idiom has originated from the idea that the nights in these three days are bright and white due to the fullness of the moon. Consequently, the days of these three nights have been called the Ayyam al-Beeḍ meaning the white days.

== Acts performed on the White Days ==
Muslims believe the most virtuous practices to perform on the White Days are fasting and spiritual retreat.

=== Fasting ===
Fasting on the White Days is recommended according to many Islamic schools of jurisprudence. Muslims believe the reward for fasting on them is as great as fasting the entire year, as the reward for fasting three days is multiplied by 10 times as much or more, making it equivalent to a month, and, if done every month, makes it equivalent to a year, without subtracting from the reward of fasting the entire month.

Abu Dharr narrated the Islamic prophet Muhammad said to him, "If you fast three days from the month, fast the 13th, 14th, and 15th.” Similarly, Qatadah ibn Malhan al-Qaysi narrated Muhammad used to command his companions to fast the days of the white nights: the 13th, 14th, and 15th of the month, saying it is equal to keeping a perpetual fast. It is also narrated Muhammad himself used to consistently fast for three days every month.

=== A traditional nasheed celebrating the white moon ===
The Arabic word badr (بدر) means 'full moon', and is often translated as 'white moon.' A traditional nasheed, Talaʽ al-Badru ʽAlayna, celebrates the badr. The main stanza is:

Tala’al-badru ‘alayna
Min thaniyyatil-wada’
Wajaba al-shukru ‘alayna
Ma da’a lillahi da’

Translation:

O the white moon rose over us
from the valley of Wada
And we owe it to show gratefulness
Where the call is to God

== See also ==
- Fasting in Islam
- Barakah
- Shab-e-barat
- Hamd
- Sadaqah
- Fatimiyya
- Hosseini infancy conference
- Chup Tazia
- Mid-Sha'ban
- Night of Wishes
- Yaqazah
