= Abd Allah ibn al-Husayn =

Abd Allah ibn al-Husayn is an Arabic name that may refer to:

- Abd Allah ibn al-Husayn, also known as Ali al-Asghar ibn Husayn (died 680), youngest son of Husayn ibn Ali
- Abd Allah al-Mahdi Billah (873–934), Isma'ili Imam and founder of the Fatimid Caliphate
- Abdullah I of Jordan (1882–1951), ruler of Jordan from 1921 until his assassination in 1951
