= Yameen al-Ghamous =

Yameen al-Ghamous (Arabic: اليمين الغموس, literally the "submerging oath"), also known as the perjurious oath, refers to a false oath that an individual intentionally swears while knowing it is an absolute lie. It is termed ghamous (submerging) because it is thought to plunge the swearer into sin, or more literally, directly submerges them into the Hellfire.

== Islamic scripture ==
In most schools of law, including the Hanafi, Maliki, and Hanbali schools, it is classified among the major sins (kaba'ir) for which no mandatory religious obligation (kaffarah) can make amends. Jurists of the four major Sunni schools of law agree that resolution of this sin requires sincere repentance (tawbah) and seeking forgiveness (Istighfar), in addition to following the normal conditions of repentance.

False oaths are discussed several times in the Quran:

"Indeed, those who exchange the covenant of Allah and their [contents of] oaths for a small price will have no share in the Hereafter, and Allah will not speak to them or look at them on the Day of Resurrection, nor will He purify them; and they will have a painful punishment."

— Allah, Quran, 3:77

Muhammad, the final prophet of God, also discusses this:

Whoever takes an oath while he is a liar in it, in order to unjustly usurp the property of a Muslim person, will meet Allah while He is angry with him.

— Muhammad, Quran

Whoever usurps the right of a Muslim person by his oath, Allah makes the Fire mandatory for him and forbids Paradise for him. Allone asked, "Even if it is something insignificant, O Messenger of Allah?" He replied, "Even if it is a twig of an arak tree."

— Muhammad, Quran

== See also ==
- Al-Kaba'ir (Major Sins)
- Perjury (False Witness)
- Oaths in Islam
