= Al-Mujadila =

58th chapter of the Qur'an

Surah 58 of the Quran
المجادلة Al-Mujādilah She Who Disputes
- Qira'ah; English text
- Classification: Medinan
- Alternate titles (Ar.): Al-Mujadalah
- Other names: The Pleading Woman, She Who Pleaded, The Disputer (alternative translation for Al-Mujadilah), the Dialogue (for Al-Mujadalah)
- Position: Juzʼ 28
- No. of verses: 22
- No. of Rukus: 3
- No. of words: 472
- No. of letters: 2,011

Al-Mujādilah (Arabic: المجادلة, She who disputed or "She Who Disputes, The Pleading Woman") is the 58th chapter (sūrah) of the Qur'an with 22 verses (ayat). Revealed in Medina, the chapter first addresses the legality of pre-Islamic method of divorce called zihar. The name "she who disputes" refers to the woman who petitioned Muhammad about the unjustness of this method, and the chapter's first verses outlaw it and prescribe how to deal with past cases of zihar. The chapter also discusses public assemblies and prescribes manners associated with it. The chapter ends by contrasting what it calls "the confederates of God" and "the confederates of Satan", and promising rewards for the former.

This surah is known for having the word "Allah" in all 22 of its verses.

== Summary ==
- 1-5 An ancient Arab custom of divorce abrogated
- 6-7 Those who oppose Muhammad threatened
- 8-11 Clandestine discourse against Muhammad censured and forbidden
- 12-14 The prophet of God to be approached with due reverence and honour
- 15-21 Muslims reproached for keeping company with Jews and infidels
- 22 Nearest relatives, if unbelievers, to be avoided as enemies of Islam

The first six verses addresses the legal status of zihar, as petitioned by Khawla. The verses effectively declare that zihar is an unlawful method of divorce. The verses also address past cases of zihar, allowing them to be reversed by freeing a slave. After the revelation, Muhammad clarified that if freeing a slave was not possible, someone who committed zihar could also perform fasting (sawm) for two months, or feed sixty poor people. The chapter then portrays this direct involvement by God in early Muslim community as a sign of his omnipresence ("He is with you wheresoever you are and God sees whatsoever you do").

The next section, verses 7 to 13, discusses political debates, which are framed as between "the confederates of God" and "the confederates of Satan". They also contain teachings for Muslims about how to conduct public assemblies (al-majalis). While in principle all individuals are free to participate in such assemblies, the verses maintain the importance of contributions from experts ("those who are possessed of knowledge"). This section also warns against conspiratorial secret meetings that are done for "iniquity, hostility and disobedience to the messenger of God".

The last section, from 14 to 21, is the longest section (ruku') of the chapter. The section defines "the confederates of God" (hizb Allah) as those "who believe in God and the Last Day" and "the confederates of Satan" (hizb al-shaitan) as those who "forgets the remembrance of God", including those who openly oppose God and Muhammad as well as hypocrites. It closes by discussing the rewards that God will give—according to the Quran—to his confederates.

== Revelation history ==
According to the Islamic tradition, the chapter was revealed during the Medinan period of Muhammad's prophethood, therefore, a Medinan sura. A minority opinion says that only the first ten verses were from the Medinan period, and the rest were from the Meccan period. Another minority opinion says that verse 9 was from the Meccan period, and the rest Medinan.

Both traditional and modern scholars of the Quran date the revelation of the chapter to between 4 AH to 7 AH (roughly 625–628 CE), likely after the Battle of the Trench. The Muslim community was in Medina under the leadership of Muhammad, under threat from the Quraysh tribe in Mecca and from the intrigues of "the hypocrites" (munafiqun, those who were outwardly Muslim but secretly opposed the Muslims) and the Jewish tribes in Medina. The Constitution of Medina acts as a constitution for this community, and the Quran—regarded as divine revelations by the Muslims—provided the law, and Muhammad acts as the final authority in interpreting the law and adjudicating disputes among the members of the community.

The chapter is the first of ten Medinan suras which addresses legal issues in the nascent state led by Muhammad in Medina. The traditional Egyptian chronology puts the chapter as the 105th chapter by the order of revelation (after Al-Munafiqun), while the Nöldeke Chronology (by the orientalist Theodor Nöldeke) puts it as the 106th.

=== "She who disputes" ===
The first section (verses 1 to 6) was revealed in response to a juridical petition by a Muslim woman named Khaula bint Tha'laba, whom the chapter name refers to. Her husband, a Muslim man named Aws ibn al-Samit, divorced her using the pre-Islamic Arabian custom of zihar. According to the custom, when a husband invoked the declaration "You are to me as my mother's back", the husband would be free to remarry and released from his obligation towards his wife, while the wife could not remarry. This practice was not isolated and many new converts to Islam used it in Medina.

Khaula considered this practice unfair to woman and petitioned Muhammad, as ruler and judge in Medina, to revoke the divorce, using moral and legal arguments. Muhammad initially declined to rule in her favor, citing the existing social custom and the lack of Quranic revelation to the contrary. According to the Islamic tradition, Khaula prayed to God about her predicament, and then God revealed the first six verses of Al-Mujadila to Muhammad, stating that her prayer was heard, overruling Muhammad and effectively outlawing the practice of zihar.

== Name ==
The chapter is named Al-Mujadila, "she who disputes", in reference to Khawla bint Tha'laba whose petition was the occasion of revelation for some of the chapter's verses. It is alternatively called Al-Mujadalah, a related word meaning "the dialogue", referring to the use of discourse and the dialectical method that is an important theme in the chapter.
