= Khawla bint Tha'labah =

Khawlah bint Tha'labah
- Companion of the Prophet
- Spouse: Aws Ibn Al Samit
- Issue: Ar-Rabia
- Religion: Islam

Khawlah bint Tha'labah (Arabic: خولة بنت ثعلبة) Khawla (b. Malik) bint Tha'laba b. Asram b. Fihr b. Qays b. Tha'laba b. Ghanm b. Salm b. 'Auf was a woman in Arabia and one of the disciples (Sahaba) of the Islamic Prophet Muhammad. She is mentioned in the Quran in reference to Zihar. The 58th chapter of the Quran Al-Mujadila, meaning "The pleading woman" derives the name from her reference.

== Zihar ==
Zihar was accepted as a form of divorce during pre-Islamic times and one day her husband Aous bin As-Samit divorced her by this method. Soon after, it was revealed in the 58th chapter, verse 1 as:

قَدْ سَمِعَ اللَّهُ قَوْلَ الَّتِي تُجَادِلُكَ فِي زَوْجِهَا وَتَشْتَكِي إِلَى اللَّهِ وَاللَّهُ يَسْمَعُ تَحَاوُرَكُمَا إِنَّ اللَّهَ سَمِيعٌ بَصِيرٌ

— الآيات الأولى من سورة المجادلة
Translation:

God has surely heard the words of her who pleaded with you against her husband and made her plaint to God. God has heard what you two said to each other. Surely God hears all and observes all.

— Al-Mujadila, verse 1

== Hadith mention ==
Imam Ahmad and Abu Dawud and quoted by Ibn Kathir in his Tafsir at the beginning of Surat al-Mujadilah .Khawla said:

"By Allah, concerning me and Aws ibn al-Samit, Allah revealed the beginning of Surat al-Mujadilah. I was married to him, and he was an old man who was bad-tempered. One day, he came in and I raised a particular issue with him again. He became angry and said, "You are to me as the back of my mother". Then he went out and sat for awhile in the meeting-place of his people. Then he came back, and wanted to resume marital relations with me. I said, 'No way! By the hand of the One in Whose hand is the soul of Khuwayla (i.e., Khawla), you will never get what you want from me after saying what you said, until Allah and His Messenger decide between us.'

Then I went to the Messenger of Allah. I sat before him, told him what my husband had done to me, and began to complain to him about my sufferings because of my husband's bad temper.

The Messenger of Allah said, "O Khuwayla, your cousin is an old man, so fear Allah with regard to him." I did not leave him until the Qur'an was revealed concerning me. He was overcome as he usually was when the Qur'an was revealed to him, and when it was over, he said: 'O Khuwayla, Allah has revealed Qur'an concerning you and your husband.' Then he recited to me: "Allah has indeed heard (and accepted) the statement of the woman who pleads with you concerning her husband…" (the verses of the holy Qur'an 58:1-4).

He told me, 'Let him release a slave.' I said, 'O Messenger of Allah, he does not have the means to do that.' He said, 'Then let him fast for two consecutive months.' I said, 'By Allah, he is an old man, he is not able to do that.' He said, 'Then let him feed sixty poor people with a wasq of dates.' I said, 'O Messenger of Allah, he does not have that much.' He said, 'Then we will help him with a faraq of dates.' I said, 'And I will help him with another faraq, O Messenger of Allah .' He said, 'You have done right and done well. Go and give it in charity on his behalf, then take care of your cousin properly.' And I did so."

== Incident with Umar ==
Imam Al Qortoby mentions one incident in his Tafsir that one day Umar ibn al-Khattab, who was the caliph at that time, met Khawla outside the mosque. He welcomed her warmly and listening to her. She advised and said: "O 'Umar, I remember you when you were called 'Umayr in the marketplace of 'Ukaz, taking care of the sheep with your stick. So fear Allah in your role as khalifah taking care of the people, and know that the one who fears the threat of punishment in the Hereafter realizes that it is not far away, and the one who fears death fears missing some opportunity in this life." That time a man asked him "You left a man of Quraish to come to this old woman?" Umar said, "Woe to you! Do you not know who this is?" and he said, "This is a woman whose complaint Allah listened to from above the seven heavens: this is Khawla bint Tha'labah. By Allah, if she did not leave me until night fell, I would not tell her to leave until she had got what she came for, unless the time for prayer came, in which case I would pray, and then come back to her until she had got what she came for."
