= Qada (Islamic term) =

The Arabic noun qada (قَضَى) means "a decree" and verb qudiya (قُضِيَ) means literally "carrying out or fulfilling". In Islamic jurisprudence it refers to fulfilling or completing those duties that one may have missed due to some reason or other. It can also mean qadi, a court judgement or the art of adjudication. A qadi is binding and enforceable, unlike a fatwa, which is merely a legal opinion. It is issued by a Qadi (judge) in response to a specific case and circumstances. The qadi may request a fatwa to help determine the legal outcome of a specific case but is not bound to follow it. The decision is based on recognized legal precedent.
