= Sakina bint Husayn =

7th-century Arab girl, descendant of Muhammad

Sakina bint al-Husayn Arabic: سكينة بنت الحسين
- The tomb of Sakina bint al-Husayn in Bab al-Saghir Cemetery, Damascus.
- Born: Between 47 AH and 51 AH (between 676 CE and 680 CE); 20 Rajab
- Died: 5 Rabi' I 117 AH (8 April 735 CE); Medina or Damascus
- Resting place: Damascus
- Spouse: Mus'ab ibn al-Zubayr
- Parents: Husayn ibn Ali (father); Rubab bint Imra al-Qais (mother)

Sakina bint al-Husayn (Arabic: سكينة بنت الحسين) (between 667 and 671 CE – 8 April 671), also known as Amina (Arabic: آمنة), was a daughter of Husayn. She was a young child in 680 at Karbala, where she witnessed the massacre of her father and his caravan by the forces of the Umayyad caliph Yazid. The women and children, among them Sakina, were taken captive in Damascus, where they were paraded in the streets and then imprisoned.

== Birth ==
Sakina or Sukayna (Arabic: سكينة, lit. 'tranquility, peace') was the epithet given to her by her mother, while her name is variously given in the sources as Āmina (Arabic: آمنة) or Amīna (Arabic: اَمینة) or Umayma (Arabic: اُمیمة). The last one is less likely, however. Her father was Husayn ibn Ali (d. 680), the third Shia Imam and the grandson of the Islamic prophet Muhammad (d. 632). Sakina was born to the first wife of Husayn, Rubab, who was the daughter of Imra' al-Qays ibn Adi, a chief of the Banu Kalb tribe. After remaining childless for some years, Sakina was the first child of the couple and possibly Husayn's eldest daughter, although some have reported that his eldest daughter was Fatima, born to Umm Ishaq bint Talha, the widow of Hasan ibn Ali (d. 670), whom Husayn married to fulfil the last wishes of his brother. Sakina was born in Medina, but her birthdate is not known with certainty. Various reports give the years 47, 49, or 51 AH, that is, circa 671 CE. The Islamicist Wilferd Madelung places her birth sometime after the 661 assassination of her grandfather Ali ibn Abi Talib, the first Shia Imam.

== Battle of Karbala (680) and captivity ==
Husayn denounced the accession of the Umayyad caliph Yazid ibn Mu'awiya in 680. When pressed by Yazid's agents to pledge his allegiance, Husayn first left his hometown of Medina for Mecca and later set off for Kufa in modern-day Iraq, accompanied by his family and a small group of supporters. Among them was Sakina, a young child at the time, aged between five and twelve. Their small caravan was intercepted and massacred in Karbala, near Kufa, by the Umayyad forces who first surrounded them for some days and cut off their access to the nearby river Euphrates. As a young child, Sakina is often the narrator of Karbala in Shia ritual commemorations, and a common narrative in commemoration of the massacre is that Sakina threw herself in front of Husayn's horse when he was leaving for the battlefield to spend a few more seconds with her father before he was killed. When Husayn was beheaded, the Umayyad soldiers pillaged his camp, and severed the heads of Husayn and his fallen companions, which they then raised on spears for display. Another common commemorative narrative is that Sakina's earrings were violently torn from her ears during the pillage. The women and children were then taken captive and marched to Kufa and later the capital Damascus. The captives were paraded in the streets of Damascus, and then imprisoned for an unknown period of time. Out of modesty, Sakina may have asked Sahl ibn Sa'd, a companion of Muhammad, to convince the soldier carrying his father's head to walk at some distance to avoid the gazes of the onlooking crowds in Damascus. The prominent Twelver traditionist Majlesi (d. 1699) describes in his Bihar al-anwar a dream he attributes to Sakina, in which she saw her grandmother Fatima (d. 632), daughter of Muhammad, mourning in the heaven while holding the blood-stained shirt of Husayn. The captives were eventually freed by Yazid. They were allowed to return to Medina, or were escorted there.

== Personal life ==
Sakina was of marriage age at Karbala by some accounts, according to which Husayn had earlier allowed his nephew Hasan ibn Hasan (d. 715) to decide which cousin he would marry, Sakina or Fatima. The first marriage of the young Sakina was to Abd-Allah ibn Hasan, another cousin, who was killed in Karbala. This marriage was probably not consummated, and she never remarried by some Shia accounts. In particular, only this childless marriage to Abd-Allah is mentioned by the Twelver scholars al-Mufid (d. 1022) in his biographical Kitab al-irshad and by Tabarsi (d. 1153) in his E'lam al-wara'. Alternatively, some Shia and Sunni authors write that Sakina later married Mus'ab ibn al-Zubayr, the Zubayrid governor of Iraq, who was killed in 691 by the Umayyad caliph Abd al-Malik ibn Marwan (r. 685–705). The couple had a daughter, named Fatima, who died in childhood. These authors include the Shia jurist Ibn Shahrashub (d. 1192) in his biographical Manaqib ale Abi Talib and the Sunni historian Ibn Khallikan (d. 1282) in his Kitab al-kawakib. Caliph Abd al-Malik proposed to Sakina after the death of her husband Mus'ab but was turned down, and she apparently rejected marriage proposals by men of power for political reasons. She later returned to Medina from Kufa, where the couple lived. Quoted by the Sunni jurist Ibn Qutayba (d. 889) in his biographical Uyun al-akhbar, there is a tradition that some Kufans wanted her to stay but she reproached them for killing her grandfather Ali ibn Abi Talib, her father Husayn, her uncle, and now her husband Mus'ab. The caliphate of Ali (r. 656–661) indeed ended with his assassination in Kufa.

Sakina later married Abd-Allah ibn Uthman ibn Abd-Allah, according to Ibn Shahrashub and the Shia historian Ibn al-Kalbi (d. 819). The couple had three children, named Uthman, Hakim, and Rubayha. When Abd-Allah died, Sakina by some accounts married Zayd ibn Amr, the grandson of the third caliph Uthman ibn Affan (r. 644–656). She died as his widow, according to the Islamicist Rizwi Faizer. Alternatively, she may have married Ibrahim ibn Abd al-Rahman ibn Awf after Zayd died. Neither of the last two marriages is said to have lasted and both are reported in Manaqib ale Abi Talib and Uyun al-akhbar. Various other accounts state that either or both of Zayd and Uthman divorced her, and some add Asbagh ibn Abd al-Aziz ibn Marwan in Egypt as another husband. He reportedly died even before Sakina arrived there. While it was not uncommon among her tribe of Quraysh for a woman to marry several times, the modern linguist Albert Arazi suggests that the reports of her many marriages are tendentious. Some have similarly argued that such reports are defamatory and contradictory, possibly fabricated by those opposed to the Alids, who are the descendants of Ali ibn Abi Talib.

== Activism and poetry ==
Sakina is described by early biographical sources as beautiful, generous, wise, and modest (afif). Her social standing was high, and she is listed as a trustworthy (theqa) narrator of hadith by the Sunni traditionist Ibn Hibban in his Kitab al-Thiqat. She was visited by the Quraysh elders, and attended the meetings of their tribal council. She was also highly critical of the Umayyads. Whenever her grandfather Ali ibn Abi Talib was cursed from the Umayyad pulpits, Sakina returned their curse, according to al-Isfahani and the Sunni historian Ibn Asakir (d. 1176). There are also controversial reports that she was not veiled in public, that she insisted in her marriage contracts on her autonomy and on her husband's monogamy, that she took one of her husbands to court for violating this clause, and that a hairstyle carried her name. The Moroccan feminist writer and sociologist Fatema Mernissi (d. 2015) thus considers Sakina as a symbol against forced hijab, while the Egyptian biographer Aisha Abd al-Rahman (d. 1998) regards such reports fabricated by the anti-Alids; among them were the Umayyads.

Sakina was also noted for her eloquence and poetry. She is said to have hosted at her house poets whom she listened to and offered her feedback and monetary reward (sela) from behind a curtain or through a maid. The guests may have included the contemporary poets al-Farazdaq (d. c. 728), Jarir ibn Atiya (d. 728), and Kuthayyir (d. 723). She also reportedly arbitrated disagreements among poets or their supporters. Such reports are scattered in the early sources, including the biographical Tazkirat ul-khawas by the Sunni scholar Ibn al-Jawzi (d. 1256-7) and Kitab al-Aghani, a collection of poems by the early historian and musicologist Abu al-Faraj al-Isfahani (d. 967). At the same time, the credibility of these reports has been questioned by some Shia authors, including the prominent Twelver theologian al-Hilli (d. 1325). Yet some others have suggested that such reports may refer not to Sakina bint Husayn but to Sakina bint Khalid ibn Mus'ab Zubayri. In particular, an elegy is ascribed to her in memory of her father Husayn, which ends as follows.

O my eyes, occupy yourself in weeping all your life;
weep with tears of blood, not for a child, family or friends, rather for the son of the Apostle of God. Pour out your tears and blood.

== Death and shrine ==
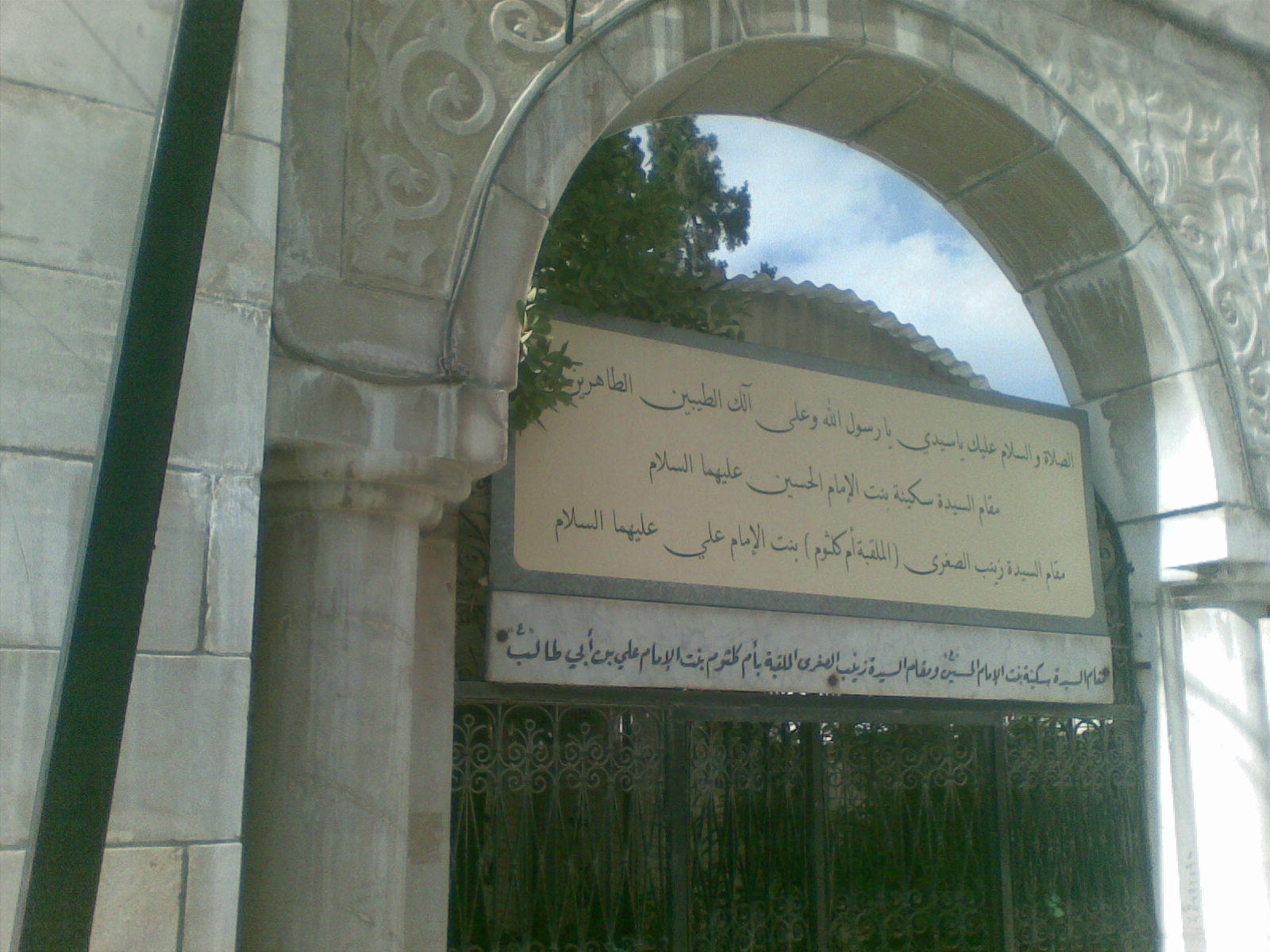
Gate to the shrine attributed to Sakina in the Bab al-Saghir cemetery in Damascus

Sakina died in Medina on 5 Rabi' al-Awwal 117 AH (8 April 735) at the age of sixty-eight and during the reign of the Umayyad caliph Hisham ibn Abd al-Malik (r. 724–743), according to Ibn Asakir and the Sunni historian al-Baladhuri (d. 892). This is also reported by the Sunni biographer Ibn Sa'd (d. 845) and by the Sunni traditionist al-Nawawi (d. 1277). Other given dates in the early sources are 92 AH (710-1) and 94 AH (712-3). Another report states that she died in Kufa at the age of seventy-seven, though Mernissi finds this unlikely. Yet there are also reports that she died in Mecca, Damascus, or Egypt. Sakina was buried in al-Baqi cemetery, but there is also a shrine attributed to her in Cairo, Egypt. There is yet another tomb in the Bab al-Saghir cemetery in Damascus and another one existed in Tiberias, Palestine. Both are falsely attributed to Sakina, according to the historian Yaqut al-Hamawi (d. 1229), who considers Medina to be her resting place.

== See also ==
- Family tree of Husayn ibn Ali
- Fatima
- Ruqayya bint Husayn
