= Rubab bint Imra al-Qais =

Spouse of Al-Husayn ibn Ali

Rubab bint Imra' al-Qays Arabic: رُبَاب بِنْت ٱمْرِئ ٱلْقَيْس
- Died: 62 AH (681-2 CE); Medina
- Spouse: Husayn ibn Ali
- Children: Sakina (d. 735); Abd-Allah (d. 680) (also known as Ali al-Asghar)
- Parents: Imru' al-Qays (father); Maysur bint Amr Ibn Tha'labah (mother)

Rubāb bint Imraʾ al-Qays (Arabic: رُبَاب بِنْت ٱمْرِئ ٱلْقَيْس) was the second wife of Husayn ibn Ali, the third Shia Imam. After some years of remaining childless, she bore Husayn two children, named Sakina and Abd-Allah, also known as Ali al-Asghar. Rubab was present at Karbala in 680 CE and witnessed there the massacre of her husband and his supporters by the forces of the Umayyad caliph Yazid (r. 680–683). Also killed there was Ali al-Asghar, who was at the time a young child, likely an infant. The women and children, among them Rubab, were marched to Kufa and then the capital Damascus, where they were paraded in the streets and then imprisoned. They were later released and returned to their hometown of Medina. Rubab refused to remarry after Husayn and died about a year later in Medina. Some elegies are ascribed to her in memory of Husayn.

== Marriage ==
Rubab was the daughter of Imra' al-Qais ibn Adi, a chief of the Banu Kalb tribe. Imra' came to Medina early during the caliphate of Umar (r. 634–644) and was given authority over the new converts to Islam from the Quda'a, a confederation of tribes that included the Banu Kalb. During that visit he was approached by Ali ibn Abi Talib, the cousin and son-in-law of the Islamic prophet Muhammad (d. 632). Ali proposed to establish marriage ties with Imra', who gave one of his daughters to Ali in marriage and promised another two to Ali's sons, Hasan (d. 670) and Husayn (d. 680), who were too young at the time. Of the two brothers, only Husayn fulfilled this promise and Rubab was thus his first wife, whom he married in the final years of the caliphate of Ali (r. 656–661). After remaining childless for some years, Rubab gave birth to Sakina, who might have also been Husayn's eldest daughter. Her birthdate is not known with certainty and various reports give the years 47, 49, or 51 AH, that is, circa 671 CE. A short poem is ascribed to Husayn in celebration of his love for Rubab and Sakina. Rubab later bore Husayn his son Abd-Allah, commonly known as Ali al-Asghar in Shia sources. Husayn's kunya, Abu Abd-Allah, probably refers to this son.

== Battle of Karbala, captivity, and death ==
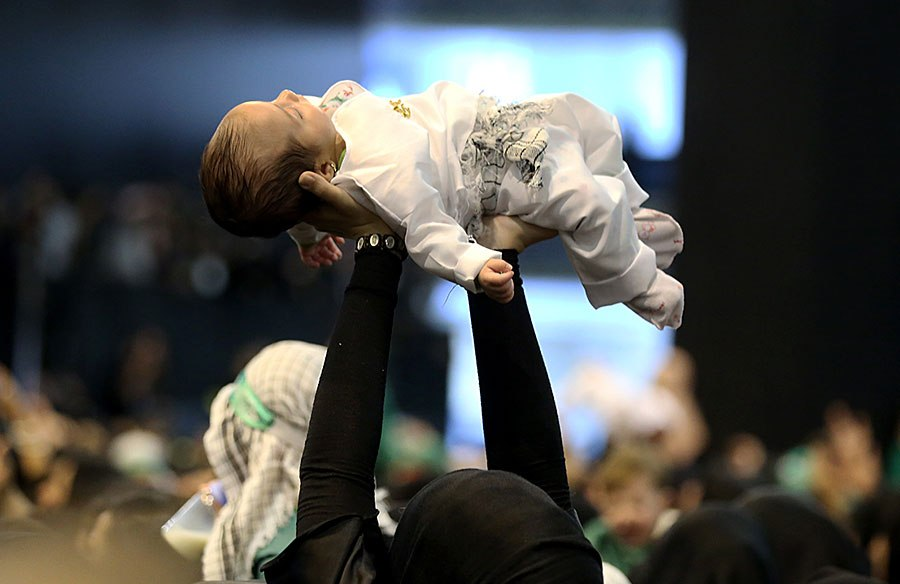
An act of commemoration for Rubab's young child, Ali al-Asghar, who was killed in the Battle of Karbala.

Husayn denounced the accession of the Umayyad caliph Yazid ibn Mu'awiya in 680. When pressed by Yazid's agents to pledge his allegiance, Husayn first fled from his hometown of Medina to Mecca and later set off for Kufa in Iraq, accompanied by his family and a small group of supporters. Among them was Rubab, according to the Sunni historian Ibn al-Athir (d. 1232-3) in his The Complete History. With her were her two children, Sakina and Abd-Allah.

The small caravan of Husayn was intercepted and massacred in Karbala, near Kufa, by the Umayyad forces who first surrounded them for some days and cut off their access to the nearby river Euphrates. Abd-Allah was also killed during the battle by an arrow. He was at the time a young child, likely an infant, as reported by the early historian Abu al-Faraj al-Isfahani (d. 967) in his biographical Maqatil al-Talibiyyin. This is also the Shia view. In the accounts of the battle presented by al-Isfahani and by the Twelver jurist Ibn Tawus (d. 1266), Rubab was addressed by Husayn in his parting words for his family before he left for the battlefield one last time. The battle ended when Husayn was beheaded, whereupon the Umayyad soldiers pillaged his camp, and severed the heads of Husayn and his fallen companions, which they then raised on spears for display. The women and children were then taken captive and marched to Kufa and later the capital Damascus. The captives were paraded in the streets of Damascus, and then imprisoned for an unknown period of time. They were eventually freed by Yazid and returned to Medina. After the death of her husband, Rubab refused to remarry. She died about a year later from grief, according to the Sunni biographer Ibn Sa'd (d. 845) in his al-Tabaqat al-kubra, and the Sunni historian Ibn Asakir (d. 1176) in his Tarikh Dimashq, among others. Rubab is said to have spent a year in grief at Husayn's grave, and died in Medina in 681 or 682. Some elegies are ascribed to her in memory of Husayn, one of which reads as follows.

Behold him who was a light shining in the darkness, is now in Karbala slain and unburied.

You were for me a fast mountain to least upon, and you were a true friend in kinship (rahim) and faith (din).

Who is left for the orphans and the needy after him who used to provide for the destitute, and to whom every poor person would run for refuge.

== See also ==
- Husayn ibn Ali
- Sakina bint Husayn
- Ali al-Asghar ibn Husayn
- Zaynab bint Ali

== Sources ==
- Burney Abbas, Shemeem (2009). "Sakineh, The Narrator of Karbala: An Ethnographic Description of a Women's Majlis Ritual in Pakistan". In Aghaie, Kamran Scot (ed.). The Women of Karbala: Ritual Performance and Symbolic Discourses in Modern Shi'i Islam. University of Texas Press. pp. 141–160. ISBN 9780292784444.
- Ayoub, Mahmoud M. (1978). Redemptive Suffering in Islam: A Study of the Devotional Aspects of Ashura in Twelver Shi'ism. De Gruyter. ISBN 9789027979438.
- Esposito, John L., ed. (2022). "Zaynab". The Islamic World: Past and Present. Oxford Reference. Oxford University Press. ISBN 978-0-19-516520-3.
- Haider, Najam (2014). Shi'i Islam: An Introduction. Cambridge University Press. ISBN 9781316061015.
- Madelung, Wilferd (2004). "Ḥosayn b. ʿAli i. Life and Significance in Shiʿism". In Yarshater, Ehsan (ed.). Encyclopædia Iranica. Vol. XII. New York: Bibliotheca Persica Press. pp. 493–498.
- Mernissi, Fatima (1991). The Veil And The Male Elite: A Feminist Interpretation Of Women's Rights In Islam. Basic Books. ISBN 9780201632217.
- Mir, Mohammad-Ali (2014). "حسین ابن علی, امام (۲)" [Husayn ibn Ali, Imam (II)]. Encyclopaedia of the World of Islam (in Persian). Vol. 13. Encyclopaedia Islamica Foundation. Archived from the original on 2016-11-07.
- Momen, Moojan (1985). An Introduction to Shi'i Islam. Yale University Press. ISBN 978-0-300-03531-5.
- Naji, Mohammad-Reza; Mohammad-Zadeh, Marziya (2017). "سكينة بنت حسین" [Sakina bint Husayn]. Encyclopaedia of the World of Islam (in Persian). Vol. 24. Encyclopaedia Islamica Foundation. Archived from the original on 2021-12-02.
- Qutbuddin, Tahera (2005). "ZAYNAB BINT 'ALĪ". In Jones, Lindsay (ed.). Encyclopedia of Religion. Vol. 14 (Second ed.). Macmillan Reference USA. pp. 9937–9. ISBN 0-02-865983-X.
- Qutbuddin, Tahera (2019). "Orations of Zaynab and Umm Kulthūm in the Aftermath of Ḥusayn's Martyrdom at Karbala: Speaking Truth to Power". In Korangy, Alireza; Rouhi, Leyla (eds.). The 'Other' Martyrs: Women and the Poetics of Sexuality, Sacrifice, and Death in World Literatures. Eisenbrauns. ISBN 9783447112147.
- Reyshahri, Mohammad (2009). دانشنامه امام حسين [The Encyclopedia of Imam Husayn] (in Persian). Vol. 1. ISBN 9789644931.
- Tabatabai, Sayyid Mohammad Hosayn (1975). Shi'ite Islam. Translated by Sayyid Hossein Nasr (First ed.). State University of New York Press. ISBN 0873953908.
- Veccia Vaglieri, Laura (2012). "(al-)Ḥusayn b. ʿAlī b. Abī Ṭālib". In Bearman, P.; Bianquis, Th.; Bosworth, C. E.; van Donzel, E.; Heinrichs, W. P. (eds.). Encyclopaedia of Islam (Second ed.). doi:10.1163/1573-3912_islam_COM_0304. ISBN 9789004161214.
