= Harmala ibn Kahil =

Umayyad archer

Harmala ibn Kahil (Arabic: حرملة بن كاهل) was an archer at the Umayyad side at the Battle of Karbala. He was the killer of Ali al-Asghar ibn Husayn, the great-grandchild of Muhammad, on 10 October, 61 AH (680 CE).

When Imam Al-Husayn had lost all hope against the enemy at the Battle of Karbala, he came out riding on a horse and asked for water for his six months old child Ali al-Asghar who was dying of thirst. Hurmala sent a three-headed arrow flying into the little child's throat.

According to shi'i sources, when Harmala was finally caught by Mukhtar al-Thaqafi, after the battle, his arms and legs were severed and he was burnt alive.

== See also ==
- Shimr
- Battle of Karbala
