= Tarikh-e Qom =

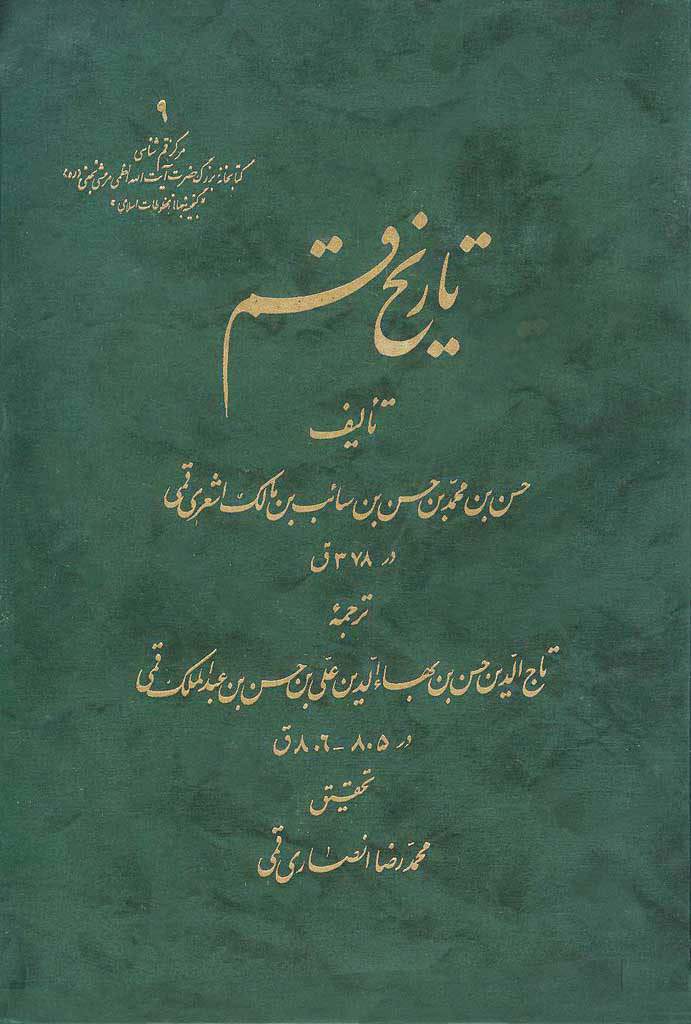
- Modern frontpage of the Tarikh-e Qom
- Author: Hasan ibn Muhammad Qomi (author); Hasan ibn Ali ibn Hasan ibn Abd-al-Malek Qomi (translator)
- Original title: تاریخ قم
- Language: Arabic (original); Persian (translation)
- Publication date: 988 (original Arabic work); 1402–1404 (Persian translation)

The Tarikh-e Qom (Persian: تاریخ قم, lit. 'The History of Qom') is an early 15th century Persian translation of a lost Arabic work composed in 988 by Hasan ibn Muhammad Qomi.

== Content ==
Many parts of the book are just as obscure as Hasan ibn Muhammad Qomi's life. He seemingly began writing his work when his brother became the tax collector of Qom. Hasan examined all available documents and collected local oral accounts. The original Arabic version had twenty chapters, while the Persian translation has only five, with each part broken down into smaller subsections. The Persian translation was made in 1402–1404 by a local resident named Hasan ibn Ali ibn Hasan Abd al-Malek Qomi, in dedication to the city's ruler, Ibrahim ibn Ali Safi.

Elements of Middle Persian and early New Persian language are uniquely documented within the Tarikh-e Qom. They are preserved inside stories that the Zoroastrian population of Qom likely knew well during the 6th and 7th centuries. It was eventually passed down to the author of the text.

=== Background ===
During the Middle Ages, many Iranian cities (such as Qom) had their own local history books written about them, but most of them have been lost. The ones that remain focus mostly on the religious matters, rather than the history of the city. The Tarikh-e Qom notably focuses on the latter.

== Author ==
Details regarding the life of Hasan ibn Muhammad Qumi are obscure. Of Arab origin, he was a descendant of the Ash'ari that had once ruled Qom. The sources that he based on his work on implies that he was a local Shi'ite scholar, and thus most likely one of the first Shi'ite historians in Iran whose work has been preserved. It was during the term of his brother Abu'l-Qasim Ali ibn Muhammad Katib as tax collector (appointed in 963), when Hasan accumulated most of his sources. In his work, Hasan does not mention any trips outside Qom to collect books, but he does mention the people he were in correspondence with, which includes the Buyid vizier Sahib ibn Abbad (died 995), to whom he dedicated his Tarikh-e Qom to. Hasan wrote his work in the same style as that of the now lost history of Isfahan by Hamza al-Isfahani (died after 961).

== Sources ==
- Drechsler, Andreas (2005). "Tāriḵ-e Qom". In Yarshater, Ehsan (ed.). Encyclopædia Iranica (Online ed.). Encyclopædia Iranica Foundation.
- Mohammadi, Meysam (2025). "Middle Persian, Early New Persian and Fahlawī Quotations in Tārīx-e Qom". Iran and the Caucasus. 12 (1). Brill: 46–101. doi:10.1163/29497833-20230033.
