= K-P-R =

Semitic root

The article contains bi-directional text.

K-P-R is a Semitic root, in Arabic and Hebrew rendered as K-F-R (Arabic: ك-ف-ر; Hebrew: כ־פ־ר). The basic meaning of the root is "to cover", but it is used in the sense "to conceal" and hence "to deny", and its notability derives from its use for religious heresy or apostasy (as it were describing the "concealment" of religious truth) in both Islam and Judaism.

== Etymology ==
Georges Bohas and Mihai Dat, in a study of triconsonantal Semitic roots, noted a connection of X-p-r, p-r-X and p-X-r roots (where X is another consonant) with meanings like "break off", "part," "cut", "shut off", "remove", "break up", "hide", "expel", suggesting a Proto-Semitic biconsontal root pr meaning "cut, divide." It is first attested in the Akkadian verb kaparu ("wipe, smear"), with D-stem kupparu.

== Amharic ==
- Qofere (Amharic: ቆፈረ) dug

== Arabic ==
=== Concepts ===
- Kufr (Arabic: كُفر), Kefirah (Hebrew: כְּפִירָה) — negation of the faith; disbelief
- Kāfir (Arabic: كافِر), pl. Kuffār (كُفّار) and Kāfirīn (كافِرين), Kofer (Hebrew: כופר), pl. Kofrim (Hebrew: כופרים) — "coverer" — unbeliever; "a person who hides or covers the truth"
- Takfīr (Arabic: تكفير) — excommunication
- Mukaffir (Arabic: مُكَفِّر) — the act which precipitates takfīr
- Kafare (Arabic) — sentence for a crime, for example lashes for adultery, used in religious issues
- Kafr (Arabic: كفر) — village
- Kaffarah (Arabic: كفارة); Kofer (Hebrew: כופר) — compensation for damages in Quranic, Talmudic and Mishnaic tort law.

=== Sunni Hadith ===
كافر (kāfir) will appear on the front of the face of dajjāl (Arabic: دجال).

== Hebrew ==
- Kofer-nefesh (Hebrew: כפר נפש)."The price of a life", "a ransom", compared to Teutonic Weregild.
- The poll tax of a half shekel to be paid by every male above twenty years at the census, as described in Exodus 30:11–16.
- The spelling "כופר" (with the stress on the e, which stands for צירה which is a long vowel) can mean an unbeliever, similar to the Arabic kafir, see Apostasy in Judaism, Heresy in Orthodox Judaism
- The main meaning of the root כפר is "atone". For example, in יום כפור (Yom Kippur), the Day of Atonement.
- Kfar (Hebrew: כפר) — village
- Kaparah (Hebrew: כפרה) — atonement for a transgression, or compensation through monetary or spiritual means. See Kaparot (Hebrew: כפרות)
- Yom Kippur (Hebrew: יוֹם כִּפּוּר) — the day of atonement

== See also ==
Arabic root k-f-r on Wiktionary
