= Heresy in Judaism =

Beliefs which contradict the traditional doctrines of Rabbinic Judaism

Heresy in Judaism are beliefs that contradict the traditional doctrines of Rabbinic Judaism, including theological beliefs and opinions about the practice of halakha (Jewish religious law). Jewish tradition contains a range of statements about heretics, including laws for how to deal with them in a communal context, and statements about the divine punishment they are expected to receive.

== Rabbinic definition of heresy ==
=== Talmudic era ===
The Greek term for heresy, αἵρεσις (airesis), originally denoted "division," "sect," "religious" or "philosophical party," is applied by Josephus to the three Jewish sects—Sadducees, Pharisees, and Essenes. In the sense of a schism to be deprecated, the word occurs in 1 Corinthians 11:19, Galatians 5:20, and particularly in 2 Peter 2:1; hence αἱρετικὸς ("heretic") in the sense of "factious" (Titus 2:10).

The specific rabbinical term for heresies, or religious divisions due to an unlawful spirit, is minim (lit. "kinds [of belief]"; the singular min, for "heretic" or "Gnostic," is coined idiomatically, like goy and am ha'aretz; see Gnosticism). The law "You shall not cut yourselves" (לא תתגדדו) is interpreted by the rabbis: "You shall not form divisions [לא תעשו אגודות אגודות], but shall form one bond" (after Amos 9:6, A. V. "troop"). Besides the term min (מין) for "heretic," the Talmud uses the words ḥitzonim (outsiders), epikoros, and kofer ba-Torah, or kofer ba-ikkar (he who denies the fundamentals of faith); also poresh mi-darke tzibbur (he who deviates from the customs of the community). Religious fundamentalists claim that all these groups are consigned to Gehinnom for all eternity and have no possibility of a portion in the world to come.

The Mishnah, in Sanhedrin 10:1, says the following have no share in the world to come: "One who says: There is no resurrection of the dead [derived] from the Torah, and [one who says: The] Torah [did] not [originate] from Heaven, and an epikoros (הָאוֹמֵר אֵין תְּחִיַּת הַמֵּתִים מִן הַתּוֹרָה, וְאֵין תּוֹרָה מִן הַשָּׁמָיִם, וְאֶפִּיקוֹרֶס." Rabbi Akiva says, "Also one who reads external literature" (Hebrew: רבי עקיבא אומר אף הקורא בספרים החיצונים). This is explained as "books of heretics" (ספרי מינים, sifrē minim) The Biblical verse, "so that you do not follow your heart and eyes" וְלֹֽא־תָת֜וּרוּ אַחֲרֵ֤י לְבַבְכֶם֙ וְאַחֲרֵ֣י עֵֽינֵיכֶ֔ם" is explained as "You shall not turn to heretic views ["minut"] which lead your heart away from God".

The Birkat haMinim is a curse on heretics. The belief that the curse was directed at Christians was sometimes cause for persecution of Jews. Modern scholarship has generally evaluated that the Birkat haMinim probably did originally include Jewish Christians before Christianity became markedly a gentile (and in the eyes of the rabbinic sages, idolatrous) religion.

=== Medieval era ===
In summarizing the Talmudic statements concerning heretics in tractate Sanhedrin 90–103, Maimonides says:

The following have no share in the world to come, but are cut off, and perish, and receive their punishment for all time for their great sin: the minim, the apikoresim, they that deny the belief in the Torah, they that deny the belief in resurrection of the dead and in the coming of the Redeemer, the apostates, they that lead many to sin, they that turn away from the ways of the [Jewish] community. Five are called 'minim': (1) he who says there is no God and the world has no leader; (2) he who says the world has more than one leader; (3) he who ascribes to the Lord of the Universe a body and a figure; (4) he who says that God was not alone and Creator of all things at the world's beginning; (5) he who worships some star or constellation as an intermediating power between himself and the Lord of the World.

The following three classes are called 'apiḳoresim': (1) he who says there was no prophecy nor was there any wisdom that came from God and which was attained by the heart of man; (2) he who denies the prophetic power of Moses our master; (3) he who says that God has no knowledge concerning the doings of men.

The following three are called 'koferim ba-Torah': (1) he who says the Torah is not from God: he is a kofer even if he says a single verse or letter thereof was said by Moses of his own accord; (2) he who denies the traditional interpretation of the Torah and opposes those authorities who declare it to be tradition, as did Zadok and Boethus; and (3) he who says, as do the Nazarenes and the Mohammedans, that the Lord has given a new dispensation instead of the old, and that he has abolished the Law, though it was originally divine.

However, Abraham ben David, in his critical notes, objects to Maimonides, a Mu'tazilite, characterizing as heretics all those who attribute corporeality to God and insinuates that Kabbalists are not heretics. In the same sense, all biblical critics who, like Abraham ibn Ezra in his notes on Deuteronomy 1:2, doubt or deny the Mosaic authorship of every portion of the Torah, would protest against the Maimonidean (or Talmudic; see Sanh. 99a) conception of heresy.

== Legal status of heretics ==
The Talmud states that the punishment for some kinds of heretic is to be "lowered into a pit, but not raised out of it", meaning that there are types of people who may legitimately be killed. The Jerusalem Talmud states that there were, at the time of the destruction of the Temple, no less than twenty-four kinds of minim. Maimonides wrote that "It is a mitzvah, however, to eradicate Jewish traitors, minnim, and apikorsim, and to cause them to descend to the pit of destruction, since they cause difficulty to the Jews and sway the people away from God." The heretic was excluded from a portion in the world to come; he was consigned to Gehenna, to eternal punishment, but the Jewish courts of justice never attended to cases of heresy; they were left to the judgment of the community.

The sentiment against the heretic was much stronger than that against the pagan. While the pagan brought his offerings to the Temple in Jerusalem and the priests accepted them, the sacrifices of the heretic were not accepted. The relatives of the heretic did not observe the laws of mourning after his death, but donned festive garments, and ate and drank and rejoiced. Torah scrolls, tefillin, and mezuzot written by a heretic were burned; and an animal slaughtered by a heretic was forbidden food. Books written by heretics did not render the hands impure; they might not be saved from fire on the Sabbath. A heretic's testimony was not admitted in evidence in Jewish courts; and if an Israelite found an object belonging to a heretic, he was forbidden to return it to him.

== Rejection of Jewish practice ==
A Jew who rejected Jewish practice could receive a status similar to one who rejected Jewish belief. The mumar le-hachis (one who transgresses out of spite for God), as opposed to the mumar le'teavon (one who transgresses due to his inability to resist the temptation of illicit pleasure), was placed by some of the Rabbis in the same category as the minim. Even if he habitually transgressed one law only (for example, if he defiantly violated one of the dietary laws out of spite for God), he was not allowed to perform any religious function, nor could he testify in a Jewish court because if one denies one divinely ordinated law it is akin to his denial of its godly origin. One who violated the Sabbath publicly or worshiped idols could not participate in the eruv chazerot, nor could he write a bill of divorce.

One who would not permit himself to be circumcised could not perform the ceremony on another. While the court could not compel the mumar to divorce his wife, even though she demanded it, they would compel him to support her and her children and to pay her an allowance until he agreed to a divorce. At his death, those who are present need not tear their garments as they would by a fellow Jew. The mumar who repented and desired readmittance into the Jewish community was obliged to take a ritual immersion, the same as the convert. If he claimed to be a good Jew, although he was alleged to have worshiped idols in another town, he was believed when no benefit could have accrued to him from such a course.

== Heresy in Orthodox Judaism ==
The definitions of heresy are sometimes different in certain Orthodox Jewish circles. Some Haredim consider many works of Maimonides to be heretical due to his sometimes liberal interpretations of the Torah. That being said, many Orthodox Jews also hold Maimonides's Mishneh Torah in very high regard. Many Orthodox Jews consider the Conservative, Reconstructionist and Reform, and Open Orthodoxy movements to be heretical due to the concessions and changes they have made relative to so-called traditional Judaism, and even smaller numbers of Hasidic groups, such as the Satmar dynasty and the Neturei Karta, consider the State of Israel to be a heretical institution. Ultimately, the majority of Orthodox Jews consider individual secular Jews; those who drive on the Sabbath; eat non-kosher foods; and in other ways violate the ways of their ancestors to be tinok shenishbim who are not responsible for their actions (as opposed to heretics who purposefully and knowingly deny God).

=== The tinok shenishba in contemporary society ===
Tinok shenishba (Hebrew: תינוק שנשבה, literally, "captured infant" [among gentiles]) is a Talmudic term for a Jew who sins inadvertently due to having been raised without an appreciation for the Judaism practiced by their ancestors. As with most instances of Talmudic terminology, derived from a specific scenario but applied to wider metaphorical analogies, an individual does not literally have to have been "captured" as an infant to fall within the definition of a tinok shenishba. This approach is widely held across Orthodox Judaism: they are not accountable for their distance from complete Jewish observance. That it applies to the many unaffiliated and unobservant Jews in contemporary society is the basis for the various Orthodox Jewish outreach professionals and organizations; even non-professionals make efforts to draw them closer.

== Jews accused of heresy ==
The present section lists individuals who have been declared heretical, independent of the particular criteria applied in the assessment. The list below is intended to be inclusive, and thus contains both individuals who have been fully excommunicated, as well as those whose works alone have been condemned as heretical. (The list is in chronological order.)

- Korach: considered a heretic by the Talmudic Sages
- Jesus of Nazareth
- Elisha ben Abuyah: heretical Talmudic Sage
- Anan ben David: His works reject the Oral Torah.
- Maimonides: His works condemned and burned by Solomon ben Abraham of Montpellier and Yonah Gerondi (who later publicly regretted his actions)
- Gersonides: His works condemned by Shem Tov ibn Shem Tov
- Abraham Abulafia: His works condemned by Rabbi Shlomo ibn Aderet.
- Sabbatai Zevi: The famous "false messiah" who converted to Islam
- Jacob Frank: A second wave "failed Messiah" who later converted to Christianity
- Baruch Spinoza: Excommunicated in the Netherlands for his pantheistic views
- Moshe Chaim Luzzatto: Excommunicated in Italy for teachings regarding the messianic era
- Jonathan Eybeschutz: Charged with the Sabbatean heresy by Jacob Emden for making kabbalistic amulets
- Shneur Zalman of Liadi: Charged with heresy by the Vilna Gaon
- Chassidism: For believing in the powers of the tzadik
- David Zvi Hoffmann: His work Mar Samuel judged to contain heresies by Samson Raphael Hirsch
- Mordecai Kaplan: Excommunicated by Union of Orthodox Rabbis following the publication of his Sabbath Prayer Book
- Louis Jacobs: Prevented from becoming British Chief Rabbi and removed from his pulpit due to his published views

== See also ==
- Anthropomorphism in Kabbalah
- Apostasy in Judaism
- Criticism of Judaism
- Criticism of Kabbalah
- Epikoros (Judaism)
- Gilyonim
- Jewish schisms
- Jewish skeptics
- K-F-R
- Kafir
- List of Jewish atheists and agnostics
- Off the derech
