= Fidyah and kaffara =

In Islam, donations for missed Ramadan fast

Fidyah or fidya (Arabic: الفدية) and kaffara or kaffarah (Arabic: كفارة) are religious donations made in Islam when a religious obligation (such as fast for Ramadan) has been missed or broken. Fidyah serves as compensation for when a Muslim was unable to fulfill the obligation for reasons beyond their control. Kaffarah deals with the breaking or missing of a fast without a valid excuse, and so is atonement rather than compensation, and requires a more significant compensatory payment or act than fidya.

Quran verse 2:184 mentions how donations of food, or money, to help feed those in need, serve as compensation for fasting missed when someone was "ill or on a journey". Some organizations have online fidyah and kaffara options.

== Fidyah ==
Fidyah (also romanized as fidya) is a religious donation of money or food made to help those in need.

Fidyah is made for fasts missed out of necessity, where the person is unable to make up for the fast afterwards – for example, if someone cannot fast for the required number of days due to ill health, pregnancy or of extreme age (old or young). In Ramadan, the fidyah must be paid for each fast missed. If, however, one misses their fast due to being sick or on a journey, but will be healthy enough to make up for it, they should preferably make up for the fast at a later date, as prescribed in the Qur'an.

== Kaffara ==
Kaffara (also romanized as kaffarah), is a religious donation of money or food made to help those in need.

Kaffara is made for fasts missed unnecessarily – for example, if someone misses or breaks a fast in the month of Ramadan without a valid reason. To make up for the broken fast, must free one slave and if unable to do so, they must fast continuously for 60 days. If they are unable to do that, they have to give a charitable compensation for the cost of an average meal for 60 poor people. In the UK, the 2021 kaffara rate is £5 per person, amounting to £300 for each intentionally broken fast.

Paying a kaffarah is also necessary in Islam for breaking a promise or an oath.

== In the Qur'an ==
Fidyah and kaffara are mentioned in the Qur'an:

"[Observing Saum (fasts)] for a fixed number of days, but if any of you is ill or on a journey, the same number (should be made up) from other days. And as for those who can fast with difficulty, (e.g. an old man, etc.), they have (a choice either to fast or) to feed a Miskin (poor person) (for every day). But whoever does good of his own accord, it is better for him. And that you fast, it is better for you if only you know."

— Quran: 2:184

== See also ==
- K-P-R
- Fasting in Islam
