= Sadaqah =

Charity in Islam

Ṣadaqah (Arabic: صدقة [ˈsˤɑdæqɑ],^{*} "charity", "benevolence", plural ṣadaqāt صدقات [sˤɑdæˈqɑːt]) in the modern-day Islamic context has come to signify "voluntary charity". Unlike zakat, which is an obligatory form of almsgiving and one of the five pillars of Islam, ṣadaqah is a voluntary offering whose amount and nature are determined solely by the benefactor, as emphasized in the Quran.

According to the Quran, the word means a voluntary offering, whose amount is at the will of the benefactor. It is similar to zakat, or compulsory giving, one of the five pillars of Islam.

It is also a cognate of the Jewish concept of tzedakah, a Hebrew word that also refers to acts of voluntary giving.

== Etymology and meaning ==
Sadaqah literally means "righteousness" and refers to the voluntary giving of alms or charity. In Islamic terminology, sadaqah has been defined as an act of "giving something... without seeking a substitute in return and with the intention of pleasing Allah." Meanwhile, according to Ar-Rageeb al-Asfahaani “Sadaqa is what the person gives from what he possesses, like Zakat, hoping to get closer to Allah."

The term sadaqah stems from the Arabic root word sidq (s-d-q, ص د ق), which means "sincerity"; sadaqah is considered a sign of sincere faith. The three-letter root of this word, s-d-q, also means, "to speak the truth", "to be sincere", and "to fulfill one's promise". All of these aspects of honorable behavior indicate the links between generosity and a healthy society.

Some modern researchers also etymologically link the word sadaqa to the Hebrew צדקה tzedāḳāh ("almsgiving"). Some experts hence conclude that sadaqa is a loanword.

Examples of sadaqah include:

- to administer justice between two people
- to remove harm from a road/removing thorns, bones and stones from paths
- to speak a good word
- to take a step towards prayer
- to guide the blind
- to support the weak with the strength of your arms
- to smile at others

== In Islamic texts ==
=== Quran ===
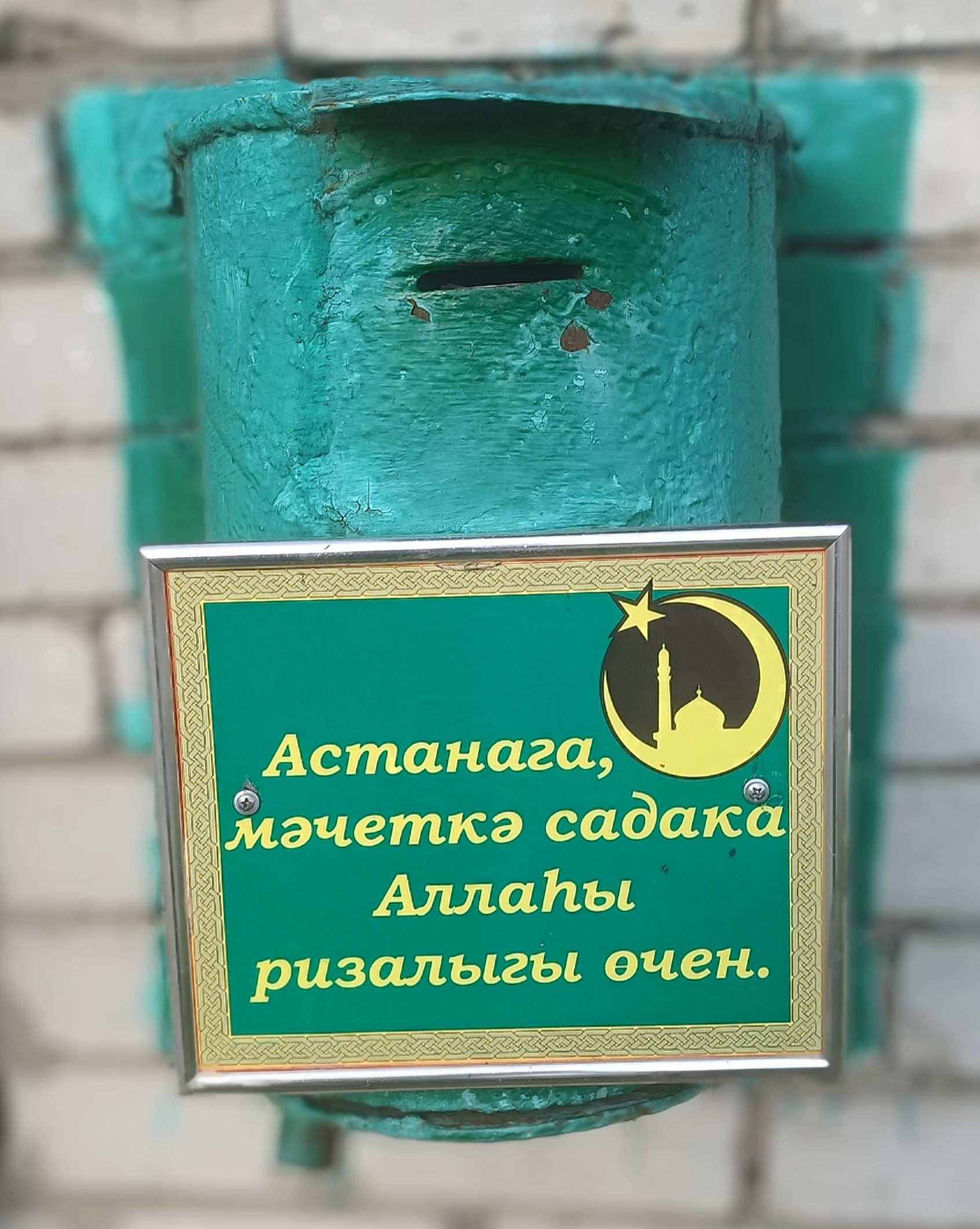
Sadaqah box in a mosque. Yakushi, Tyumensky District, Russia. July 2026.

The word zakah (meaning the obligatory zakah) occurs 30 times in the Quran—27 times linked with prayer, three times not so-linked.^{[Quran 41:7]} The word sadaqah (non-obligatory charity) and its plural (sadaqat) occur 13 times in the Qur'an.

"Sadaqat" is used in the Quran to cover all kinds of charity. Zakat has been called sadaqat because it is also a kind of compulsory charity. It is an obligatory sadaqa while ordinary sadaqa are voluntary. Thus, zakat has to be collected by the muhtasib (collector) or the government (the Islamic state) as a compulsory levy.

According to the Quran, sadaqa leads to the purification of the benefactor. The Quran says that sadaqa does not need to be in a material form and can also be a "voluntary effort", or a kind word.^{[Quran 9:79]} This is in agreement with a narration attributed to Muhammad which says "every good deed is a form of sadaq."

Kind words and compassion are deemed better than sadaqa accompanied by insult, from the viewpoint of the Quran. It is also preferable for donations to be offered discreetly to those in need rather than being done in public to seek acknowledgment. The Quran criticizes donations aimed at appearing generous and compromising the value of sadaqa through ostentatious public behavior, which renders a normally charitable act purely self-serving. The Quran suggests that sadaqa is not meant only to support the poor but can also be donated to others who may not be visibly in need, helping those who require assistance to enhance their lives or need guidance toward new jobs and economic opportunities.

Among the many verses on sadaqat, either voluntary or obligatory, are these:

- And be steadfast in prayer; practise regular charity; and bow down your heads with those who bow down (in worship).^{[Quran 2:43]}
- They ask thee what they should spend (In charity). Say: Whatever ye spend that is good, is for parents and kindred and orphans and those in want and for wayfarers. And whatever ye do that is good, Allah knoweth it well.^{[Quran 2:215]}
- Kind words and the covering of faults are better than charity followed by injury. Allah is free of all wants, and He is Most-Forbearing.^{[Quran 2:263]}
- Allah will deprive usury of all blessing, but will give increase for deeds of charity: For He loveth not creatures ungrateful and wicked.^{[Quran 2:276]}
- Those who believe, and do deeds of righteousness, and establish regular prayers and regular charity, will have their reward with their Lord: on them shall be no fear, nor shall they grieve.^{[Quran 2:277]}
- So fear Allah as much as ye can; listen and obey and spend in charity for the benefit of your own soul and those saved from the covetousness of their own souls, they are the ones that achieve prosperity.^{[Quran 64:16]}

=== Hadith ===
According to some ahadith, "a kind word and smile" can be considered as sadaqa and the best form of it is "passing on knowledge." Also, Muhammad said in a hadith that sadaqa removes seventy gates of evil.

== Difference from zakat ==
The word sadaqa is interchangeably used with zakat and nafaqa in some contexts, but while zakat is obligatory, sadaqa usually refers to voluntary donations.

Zakat is a required minimum contribution by Muslims in terms of money and property or goods that can help Muslims who need assistance, while sadaqah can be in the form of money, deeds, property, or salutations.

The term sadaqah was used in the Quran and Sunnah for both zakat and charity. Among the differences between them is that in the case of zakat, the amount is fixed, utilized according to that which has been stated by the Islamic Law, and paid only once a year. However charity has no fixed percentage and one is free to pay it as many times as one can afford or feel inclined to it.

== Categories of the entitled ==
According to Quran 9:60, there are eight categories of people who are entitled to receive sadaqah (zakaat). They are:

1. The poor (al-fuqarâ’), that is low-income.
2. The needy people (al-masākīn).
3. The officials appointed to receive sadaqah (zakat administrators).
4. Those whose hearts have been (recently) reconciled to Islam (al-mu'allafa qulubuhum).
5. To free the slaves and captives.
6. Those who are overburdened with debt.
7. In the cause of Allah to spread the message of Islam.
8. To those who are wayfarers (travelers who do not have enough money to go back home).

== Significance ==
=== Social contribution ===
- It enhances the well-being of the people in Islamic society.
- It helps in fulfilling the requirement of the poor Muslims.
- It lightens the debt of the Muslim debtors.
- It helps in taking care of those whose hearts have been (recently) reconciled (to the Truth).
- It helps the stranded Muslims to complete their journey.
- It helps in the healing of various Sickness (according to the prophet of Islam).

=== Spiritual effects ===
- It purifies human's heart from the sins of malice, greed, and the obsessive love of wealth.
- It increases the wealth.
- It removes bad luck.
- It helps in crossing the bridge of Siraat.
- It guarantees heaven.

== See also ==
- Al-Kaffarah
- Alms
- Sadaqah Jariyah
- Khums
- Tzedakah
- Zakat
- Zidqa, almsgiving in Mandaeism

== Notes ==
- ^Pronunciation variations in Literary Arabic: /sˤadaqa/, the first and the last vowels could be backed to [ɑ] and the last vowel could be turned to [ɐ]. The second vowel could also be backed to [ɑ] or fronted to [æ]. Thus [sˤɑdæqɑ, sˤɑdæqɐ, sˤɑdɑqɑ]. See Arabic phonology.
