= Zihar =

Form of Islamic divorce

Zihar or Dhihar (Arabic: ظھار) (Arabic pronunciation: [ðˤihaːr]; Ẓihār): /ˈziːˈhɜːr/; ZEE-hu-Er；is a term used in Islamic jurisprudence, which literally connotes an admonition by Allah to the believers. During pre-Islamic Arabia, Dhihar, was a practice in which a man referred to his wife as his mother or by uttering that, “you are, to me, like my mother”. This constitutes a form of revocable divorce (although it is invalid). If a husband says these words to his wife, it is highly unlawful for him to have sexual intercourse with her unless he makes recompense by freeing a slave, fasting for two successive months, or feeding sixty poor people.

== Background ==
Zihar was accepted as a declaration of divorce among pre-Islamic Arabs and it is mentioned in the Quran in reference to Khawla bint Tha'labah, who was divorced by this formula in the chapter 58, verses 1-4:

God has surely heard the words of her who pleaded with you against her husband and made her plaint to God. God has heard what you two said to each other. Surely God hears all and observes all.

Those of you who divorce their wives by declaring them to be their mothers' backs should know that they are not their mothers. Their mothers are only those who bore them. The words they utter are unjust and false: but God pardons and forgives.

Those that divorce their wives by so saying, and afterwards retract their words, shall free a slave before they touch each other again. This you are enjoined to do: God is cognizant of what you do. He that has no slave shall fast two successive months before they touch one another. He that cannot shall feed sixty of the destitute. Thus it is, so that you may believe in God and His apostle. Such are the bounds set by God. Woeful punishment awaits the unbelievers.

== Legality ==
Zihar is illegal and considered an insult in the Islamic law. It implies that the man, declaring his wife akin to his mother, is guilty of the sin of forbidding the lawful things. It has been proscribed by law and the act does not ensue in divorce. Thus, penalties in the form of setting free a slave, fasting, or feeding the poor have been imposed for it.
