= List of observances set by the Solar Hijri calendar =

Dates in this table are determined by when the March Equinox falls. It will fall on March 20 from 2018 to 2023.

Holiday date	Holiday name	Description	March equinox on March 19	March Equinox on March 20	March Equinox on March 21
1–4 Farvardin	Nowruz	New Year celebration of Spring. Public holiday in Iran. Note: Nowruz is the day after the March equinox.	March 20–24	March 21–25	March 22–26
12 Farvardin	Islamic Republic Day	Public holiday in Iran	March 31	April 1	April 2
13 Farvardin	Sizdah Bedar	Public holiday in Iran	April 1	April 2	April 3
3 Ordibehesht	Teacher's Day in Afghanistan	Not an official observance	April 22	April 23	April 24
12 Ordibehesht	Teacher's Day in Iran	The Islamic Republic government changed the original date to coincide with the assassination of Morteza Motahhari on 1 May 1979.	May 1	May 2	May 3
14 Khordad	Anniversary of the Death of Khomeini	Public holiday in Iran	June 3	June 4	June 5
15 Khordad	Anniversary Revolt of Khordad 15	Public holiday in Iran	June 4	June 5	June 6
13 Tir	Tirgan	Mid-summer festival	July 3	July 4	July 5
7 Mordad	Amordadegan festival	127 days after Nowruz	July 28	July 29	July 30
1 Shahrivar	National Doctors' Day in Iran	Avicenna's birthday	August 22	August 23	August 24
3 Shahrivar	Day of Combat Against British Colonialism	Public holiday in Iran	August 24	August 25	August 26
18 Shahrivar	Martyrs' Day (Afghanistan)	Celebrated as Haftai Shahid, or "Martyr Week". It is also observed as "Massoud Day"	September 8	September 9	September 10
31 Sharivar	Start of Sacred Defence Week	Also called Holy Defence Week. Commemoration of the 1980-1988 Iran-Iraq war.	September 21	September 22	September 23
10 Mehr	Mehregan	Zoroastrian festival celebrated in Autumn	October 1	October 2	October 3
7 Aban	Cyrus the Great Day	Unofficial holiday commemorating Cyrus the Great	October 28	October 29	October 30
16 Azar	Student Day (Iran)	Anniversary of the murder of three students of University of Tehran on December 7, 1953.	December 6	December 7	December 8
30 Azar	Yaldā Night	Winter festival celebrated on the December solstice. Also celebrated in Azerbaijan, Afghanistan, Kurdistan, Tajikistan, Turkey (by Kurds and Azeris), and in Pakistan (by Pashtuns and Balochs)	December 20	December 21	December 22
1 Dey	Khorram rooz	Ancient Persian considered this the first day of their New Year	December 21	December 22	December 23
10 Bahman	Sadeh	50 days before Nowruz	January 29	January 30	January 31
22 Bahman	Anniversary of Islamic Revolution	Public holiday in Iran	February 10	February 11	February 12
5 Esfand	Sepandārmazgān	Described as "Persian Day of Love"	February 23	February 24	February 25
15 Esfand	Arbor Day in Iran	First day of the Natural Recyclable Resources Week	March 5	March 6	March 7
Eve of the last Wednesday before Nowruz	Chaharshanbe Suri	Also observed in Azerbaijan, Afghanistan, Iraqi Kurdistan, Tajikistan and in Turkey (by Azeris and Kurds)	varies	varies	varies
29 Esfand	Nationalization of Oil Industry	Public holiday in Iran	March 19	March 20	March 21

== See also ==
- Public holidays in Iran
- Solar Hijri calendar
- List of observances set by the Islamic calendar
- List of observances set by the Baháʼí calendar
