= List of observances set by the Islamic calendar =

All Islamic observances begin at the sundown prior to the date listed, and end at sundown of the date in question unless otherwise noted.

== Holidays for 1441 (2019-2020) ==
Date on Islamic Calendar	Gregorian date	Name	Notes
Muharram	August 30 - September 29, 2019	Muharram	1st month of the Islamic calendar, can be either 29 or 30 days.
1 Muharram	August 31, 2019	Islamic New Year	
1-10 Muharram	August 31-September 9, 2019	Bibi-Ka-Alam	event held in Hyderabad, India
2 Muharram	September 1, 2019	Shia day of Mourning: Arrival of Imam Hussain in Karbalā, 61 A.H.	
3 Muharram	September 2, 2019	Shia day of Mourning: Water supply to Imam Husain & his companions was stopped in Karbalā	
6 Muharram	September 5, 2019	Mourning of Muharram	See Hosay and Tabuik
7 Muharram	September 6, 2019	Shia day of Mourning: Stored water in the tents runs out	
9 Muharram	September 8, 2019	Day of Tasu'a	See also Chehel Minbari (Shia Muslims, Lorestan Province, Iran)
10 Muharram	September 9, 2019	Day of Ashura	For Sunnis, the crossing of the Red Sea by Moses occurred on this day. For both Shias and Sunnis, the martyrdom of Husayn ibn Ali, the grandson of Muhammad, and his followers.
12 Muharram	September 11, 2019	Shia day of Mourning: Siyyum of Shaheed-e-Karbala	3rd day of Ashura
17 Muharram	September 16, 2019	Shia day of Remembrance: Aam-ul-feel	Abraha attacked on Ka'aba
18 Muharram	September 17, 2019	Shia day of Remembrance: Qibla was changed from Bait-ul-Muqqaddas to Ka'bah, 2 A.H	
20 Muharram	September 19, 2019	Shia day of Mourning: 10th day of Ashura	
25 Muharram	September 24, 2019	Shia day of Mourning: Martyrdom of Imam Zain-ul-Abideen, 95 A.H.	
30 Muharram	September 29, 2019	Shia day of Mourning: 20th day of Ashura	Note: Observed next day in years in which Muharram has only 29 days
1-30 Safar	September 30 - October 28, 2019	2nd Month of the Islamic Calendar	
1 Safar	September 30, 2019	Two Shia Days of Remembrance	
7 Safar	October 6, 2019	Birth of Imam Musa-e-Kazim, 128 A.H.	
10 Safar	October 9, 2019	Multiple Shia days of remembrance	
12 Safar	October 11, 2019	Shia day of remembrance: Birth of Janab-e-Salman-e-Farsi	
17 Safar	October 18, 2019	Shia day of remembrance:Martyrdom of Imam Ali Reza, 203 A.H.	According to some scholars 29 Safar or 23rd Dhu al-Qi'dah
20 Safar	October 19, 2019	Arba'een	
28 Safar	October 27, 2019	Shia Day of mourning: Demise of Muhammad and Imam Hassan (Mujtaba)	Public holiday in Iran According to some scholars 17 Safar or 23rd Zul'Hijjah
29 Safar	October 28, 2019	Martyrdom of Imam Reza	Public holiday in Iran
Rabi I (29 days)	October 29-November 27, 2019	3rd month on Islamic calendar, can have 30 days some years	
1 Rabi I	October 29, 2019	Shia day of Remembrance: Hijrat (migration) of Muhammad	
5 Rabi I	November 2, 2019	Shia day of Remembrance: Wafat of Janab-e-Masooma-e-Qum	
8 Rabi I	November 5, 2019	Shia day of Remembrance: Martyrdom of Imam Hasan Askari, 260 A.H.	
9 Rabi I	November 6, 2019	Eid-e-Shuja'	Observed by most Twelver Shi‘a Muslims
9 Rabi I	November 6, 2019	Shia day of Celebration: Imamat day of Imam-e-Zaman	
12 Rabi I]	November 9, 2019	Mawlid	Sunni only, Shia celebrate on Rabi I 17
14 Rabi I	November 11, 2019	Shia day of Remembrance: Yazid was killed	
15 Rabi I	November 12, 2019	Shia day of Remembrance: First mosque (Quba Mosque) was established, 1 A.H	
17 Rabi I	November 14, 2019	Mawlid	Shia sect date. Sunnis celebrate on 12th. Public holiday in Iran
17 Rabi I	November 14, 2019	Shia day of Celebration: Birth of Imam Jafar-as-Sadiq, 83 A.H.	
18 Rabi I	November 15, 2019	Shia day of Remembrance: Birth of Janab-e-Umm-e-Kulsum Bint-e-Ali	
Rabi II (29 days)	November 28-December 26, 2019	4th month of the Islamic calendar	
1 Rabi II	November 28, 2019	Qaumee Dhuvas (Maldives National Day)	
8 Rabi II	December 5, 2019	Shia day of Mourning: Martyrdom of Imam Hasan Askari, 260 A.H.	Commemorated by Chup Tazia
11 Rabi II	December 11, 2019	Urs of Abdul-Qadir Gilani	
Jumada I (29–30 days)	December 27, 2019 - January 25, 2019	5th Month of the Islamic calendar	
1 Jumada I	December 27, 2019	Shia day of Remembrance: Death of Harun Rashid	
10 Jumada I	January 5, 2020	Shia day of Remembrance: Battle of the Camel	
14 Jumada I	January 9, 2020	Shia day of Mourning: Martyrdom of Janab-e-Fatima-az-Zahra, 11 A.H	According to some scholars on 13th of same month or 3rd Jamadi-ul-Aakhir
15 Jumada I	January 10, 2020	Shia day of Celebration:Birth of Imam Zain-ul-Abideen, 37 A.H.	According to some scholars on 15th of Jamadi-ul-Aakhir or 5th Shabaan
Jumada II (29 days)	January 26-February 24, 2020	6th month of the Islamic calendar	
3 Jumada II	January 28, 2019	Martyrdom of Fatima (Iran)	
13 Jumada II	February 7, 2019	Shia day of Remembrance:Death of Umm ul-Banin (mother of Abbas ibn Ali)	
20 Jumada II	February 14, 2019	Shia day of Celebration: Birth of Janab-e-Fatima-az-Zahra, 8 B.H./Mother's Day in Iran	
26 Jumada II	February 20, 2019	Shia day of Mourning: Martyrdom of Imam Ali Naqi	According to some scholars on 3rd of Rajab
Rajab	February 25 - March 24, 2020	7th Month of the Islamic calendar	
1 Rajab	February 25, 2020	Shia day of Celebration:Birth of Imam Mohammed Baqir, 57 A.H.	
6 Rajab	March 1, 2020	Urs of Moinuddin Chishti. (Sunni)	
7 Rajab	March 2, 2020	Shia day of Celebration: Birth of Abbas, 36 A.H.	According to some scholars on 4th Shabaan
9 Rajab	March 6, 2020	Shia day of Celebration: Birth of Janab E Ali Asghar	
10 Rajab	March 7, 2020	Shia day of Celebration: Birth of Imam Mohammad Taqi, 195 A.H.	
13 Rajab	March 10, 2020	Shia day of Celebration: Birth of Imam Ali	Public holiday in Iran
13 Rajab	March 8, 2020	Father's Day in Iran, Mauritania Somalia, and Sudan	
15 Rajab	March 10, 2020	Shia day of Mourning: Martyrdom of Imam Jafar-as-Sadiq	
18 Rajab	March 13, 2020	Shia day of Remembrance: Wafat Ibrahim	
20 Rajab	March 15, 2020	Shia day of Celebration:Birth of Janab-e-Sakina	
22 Rajab	March 17, 2020	Shia day of Celebration: Niyaz/Nazr of Imam Jafar-as-Sadiq	
24 Rajab	March 19, 2020	Shia day of Remembrance: Birth of Janab-e-Ali-Asgar	
25 Rajab	March 20, 2020	Shia day of Mourning: Martyrdom of Imam Musa-e-Kazim	
26 Rajab	March 21, 2020	Shia day of Remembrance: Wafat of Abu Talib	
27 Rajab	March 22, 2020	Lailat al-Mi'raj	Public holiday in Iran
28 Rajab	March 23, 2020	Shia day of Mourning: Imam Husayn ibn ‘Alī started his journey to Karbalā from Medina, 60 A.H.	
Sha'ban	March 25 - April 23, 2020	8th Month of the Islamic calendar	
15 Sha'ban	April 8, 2020	Birth of Imam Mahdi/Mid-Sha'ban	Public holiday in Iran, Gargee'an
Ramadan (calendar month)	April 24 - May 23, 2020	9th month of the Islamic calendar	
1 Ramadan	April 24, 2020	First day of Ramadan	Public holiday in Malaysia
14 Ramadan	May 7, 2020	Garangao	
15 Ramadan	May 8, 2020	Gargee'an	
17 Ramadan	May 10, 2020	Day of Nuzul Al-Quran	Public holiday in Malaysia, this date is also celebrated in Indonesia. See also 22 Ramadan for alternative date.
19 Ramadan	May 12, 2020	One of three dates used by Shia Muslims for Laylat al-Qadr	See notes for 23 Ramadan
20 Ramadan	May 13, 2020	Conquest of Mecca	Shia day of remembrance
21 Ramadan	May 14, 2020	Martyrdom of Imam Ali, also one of the dates used by Sunnis for Laylat al-Qadr, see 27 Ramadan entry.	Public holiday in Iran, Azadari in Lucknow, see entry for 23 Ramadan.
22 Ramadan	May 15, 2020	Shia Day of Remembrance: Nuzool Quran	Shia sect only, day is celebrated 17 Ramadan in Indonesia and Malaysia
23 Ramadan	May 16, 2020	Laylat al-Qadr, Shia Date	Most Shia traditions celebrate on this date, they believe that is Laylat al-Qadr is to be found in the last ten odd nights of Ramadan but mostly on the 19th, 21st or 23rd of Ramadan with 23rd being the most important night. The 19th, according to the Shia belief coincides with the night Ali was attacked in the Mihrab while worshipping in the Great Mosque of Kufa, and died on the 21st of Ramadan. Shia Muslims regard these three nights as greatly rewarding. Sunnis also use this date as one of the Laylat al-Qadr days, see 27 Ramadan entry.
25 Ramadan	May 18, 2020	One of the dates of Laylat al-Qadr in Sunni tradition	See notes for 27 Ramadan.
27 Ramadan	May 20, 2020	Laylat al-Qadr, Sunni Date	
Last Friday of the month of Ramadan	May 22, 2020	Jumu'atul-Wida/Quds Day	
29 Ramadan	May 22, 2020	One of the dates of Laylat al-Qadr in Sunni tradition	See entry for 27 Ramadan
29-30 Ramadan (Ramadan is 30 days during some years)	May 22-23, 2020	Chaand Raat	
Shawwal	May 24-June 21, 2020	10th month of the Islamic calendar	
1-2 Shawwal	May 24-25, 2020	Eid al-Fitr	Chaand Raat, Durbar festival, Lebaran
2 Shawwal	May 25, 2020	Shia Day of Remembrance: Battle of the Trench (Khandak)	
8 Shawwal	May 31, 2020	Day of Sorrow	
9 Shawwal	June 1, 2020	Shia Day of Remembrance: Janab-e-Khadijat-ul-Kubra married to Muhammed	
10 Shawwal	June 2, 2020	Shia Day of Remembrance: Ghaibat-e-Kubra-e-Imam-e-Zaman	
15 Shawwal	June 7, 2020	Shia Day of Remembrance: Shahadat of Hamzah in Battle of Uhud, 3 A.H.	
25 Shawwal	June 17, 2020	Martyrdom of Imam Jafar	Public holiday in Iran
29 Shawwal	June 21, 2020	Shia Day of Remembrance: Birth of Abu Talib	
Dhu'l-Qa'da	June 22 - July 21, 2020	11th month of the Islamic calendar	
1 Dhu'l-Qa'da	June 22, 2020	Shia Day of Remembrance: Birth of Janab-e-Masoom-e-Qum	
6 Dhu'l-Qa'da	June 27, 2020	Shia Day of Remembrance: the Treaty of Hudaybiyyah was executed, 6 A.H.	
11 Dhu'l-Qa'da	July 2, 2020	Shia Day of Celebration: Birth of Imam Ali Reza, 148 A.H.	
25 Dhu'l-Qa'da	July 16, 2020	Multiple Shia days of Remembrance	
29 Dhu'l-Qa'da	July 20, 2020	Shia Day of Remembrance: Martyrdom of Imam Mohammad Taqi	
Dhu'l-Hijja	July 22-August 19, 2020	12th month of the Islamic calendar	
1 Dhu'l-Hijja	July 22, 2020	Shia Day of Remembrance: Sayeda Fatima married to Ali	
1-9 Dhu'l-Hijja	July 22-July 30, 2020	Fasting days	
1-10 Dhu'l-Hijja	July 22 - July 31, 2020	Nights for standing (Qiyaam) in Tahajjud	
3 Dhu'l-Hijja	July 24, 2020	Shia Day of Remembrance: Renunciation of Adam accepted	
7 Dhu'l-Hijja	July 28, 2020	Shia Day of Mourning: Martyrdom of Imam Mohammad Baqir	
8 Dhu'l-Hijja	July 29, 2020	Shia Day of Mourning: Imam Hussain started from Mecca to Karbala	
8–13 Dhu'l-Hijja	July 29 - August 3, 2020	Hajj	
9 Dhu'l-Hijja	July 30, 2020	Day of Arafah/Shia Day of Mourning: Martyrdom of Janab-e-Muslim ibn Aqil & Hani ibn Urwah in Kufa	
9-13 Dhu'l-Hijja	July 30 - August 3, 2020	Takbirut Tashreeq	
10-13 Dhu'l-Hijja	July 31 - August 3, 2020	Eid al-Adha	Durbar festival
15 Dhu'l-Hijja	August 5, 2020	Shia Day of Celebration: Birth of Imam Ali Naqi	
16 Dhu'l-Hijja	August 6, 2020	Shia Day of Mourning: Wafat of Janab-e-Zainab	
18 Dhu'l-Hijja	August 8, 2020	Eid al-Ghadeer	Shia sect only, public holiday in Iran
19 Dhu'l-Hijja	August 9, 2020	Shia Day of Remembrance: Sayeda Fatima went to Ali's house after their marriage	
23 Dhu'l-Hijja	August 13, 2020	Shia Day of Remembrance: Martyrdom of Farzand-e-Muslim	
24 Dhu'l-Hijja	August 14, 2020	Eid al-Mubahila	
27 Dhu'l-Hijja	August 17, 2020	Shia Day of Remembrance: Wafat of Janab-e-Meesum-e-Tammaa	

== See also ==
- List of Gregorian Islamic observances
- List of observances set by the Solar Hijri calendar
