= Students for Freedom and Equality =

Iranian student organization

Students for Freedom and Equality دانشجویان آزادی‌خواه و برابری‌طلب
- Founded: 2006
- Dissolved: 2009
- Ideology: Socialism

Students for Freedom and Equality (SFE) (Persian: دانشجویان آزادی‌خواه و برابری‌طلب, romanized: Daneshjooyan-e Azadikhah va Barabaritalab) was a left-wing Iranian student organization that was active between 2006 and 2009. After the Iranian Cultural Revolution (1980–1983), Students for Freedom and Equality represented the first organized presence of left-wing student activism across Iran's universities.

In December 2007, Students for Freedom and Equality organized a series of demonstrations on several campuses, commemorating Iran's Student Day. Ahead of the demonstrations, agents of Iran's Military Intelligence began arresting student activists belonging to Students for Freedom and Equality. According to Human Rights Watch, during this country-wide crackdown on the organization, over 40 student activists were arrested and tortured.

== Founding ==
Although left-wing activists had a significant presence in some universities since the early 2000s, the announcement of the existence of Students for Freedom and Equality took place in 2006. During the June 2006 student protests, a group of left-wing students issued a statement entitled "University is not a barracks" and signed it as Students for Freedom and Equality.

According to the enactments of the Supreme Council of the Cultural Revolution, non-Islamic organizations are not allowed to operate in universities. Either before or after their Student Day demonstration on December 4, 2007, Students for Freedom and Equality were not an "organization" in the general sense, but consisted of left-wing students organized around a variety of student and political activities.
