= Pupil Day (Iran) =

Pupil Day, Anniversary of murder Tehran's pupil

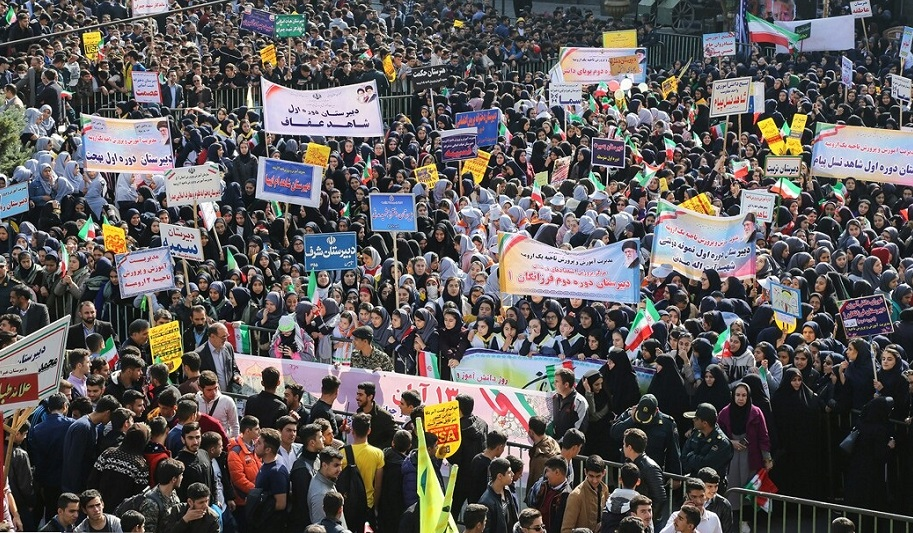
Anniversary of 13 Aban; Pupil Day, Iran

Pupil Day (Persian: روز دانش‌آموز) in Iran falls on 13 Aban (typically November 4). According to records from the Foundation of Martyrs and Veterans Affairs, the day commemorates the death of two individuals—one of whom was a student—during the 1979 Revolution protests on the morning of November 4, 1978 (13 Aban 1357 SH) at the University of Tehran.

== Event ==
On the morning of November 4, 1978, students in Tehran gathered on the campus of the University of Tehran as a sign of protest. They were targeted by security forces under the government of Jafar Sharif-Emami.

During this demonstration, which included participation from other social groups, security forces used tear gas and live ammunition. According to documented reports, one student was killed and three others were injured during the clash.

== Origin of naming ==
On February 5, 1979 (16 Bahman 1357 SH), a group of students from schools in the capital issued a statement declaring: "We, the Iranian students, declare Saturday, November 4, 1978 (13 Aban), as 'Pupil Day' and intend to commemorate the martyrs of the student movement annually to strengthen our unity." To honor this occasion, 13 Aban was officially incorporated into the Iranian calendar as Pupil Day.

== Casualties ==
The reported number of casualties is a subject of significant discrepancy. Some Iranian state-affiliated archives, such as the Center for Historical Documents Investigation, claim that 56 people were killed. However, these accounts often employ highly partisan and non-neutral terminology, describing the government of the time as a "bloodthirsty regime" (saffak) and its security forces as "executioners" (dezhkhiman). These figures are not corroborated by official martyr databases or independent historical research, such as those by Emadaddin Baghi, which report far fewer confirmed deaths.

== See also ==
- Student Day (Iran)
