= Public holidays in Iran =

Iran uses three official calendar systems, including the Solar Hijri calendar as the main and national calendar, the Gregorian calendar for international events and Christian holidays, and the Lunar Hijri calendar for Islamic holidays.

In 2008, the Iranian government's English-language newspaper Iran Daily wrote that "[the] problem of too many annual public holidays has perpetually been a subject of concern," pointing out that the government would often declare "unofficial holidays [...] to allow extended weekends" around the national holidays. "[I]f official and unofficial holidays are added to weekends, almost half the year the country is holidaying! The serious issue of so many holidays should not be tolerated [...]"

Iran is one of the countries with the most public holidays in the world, with 28 holidays. Many holidays' exact dates are determined by the Islamic calendar, and therefore their Gregorian dates vary from year to year.

== Events ==
Solar Events
Date	Event	Local name	Remarks
Farvardin 1-4	Nowruz (March 21-24)	نوروز – Nowruz	Iranian New Year
Farvardin 12	Islamic Republic Day (April 1)	روز جمهوری اسلامی – Ruz e Jomhuri ye Eslāmi	
Farvardin 13	Sizdah Bedar (April 2)	سیزده بدر	Commonly pronounced and spelled Sizdah Bedar
Khordad 14	Death of Khomeini (June 4)	￼روز فوت امام خمینی Erteholiday	
Khordad 15	Revolt of Khordad 15 (June 5)	قیام ۱۵ خرداد – Qiām e Pānzdah e Xordād	
Bahman 22	Anniversary of Islamic Revolution (February 11)	انقلاب اسلامی پنجاه و هفت – Enqelāb e Eslāmi	Officially the Islamic Revolution
Esfand 29	Nationalization of the Iranian oil industry (March 20)	ملی شدن صنعت نفت – Melli Šodan e Saneat e Naft	

Lunar Events
Date	Event
Muharram 9	Tasua
Muharram 10	Ashura
Safar 20	Arbaeen
Safar 28	Death of Muhammad and Hasan ibn Ali (Mujtaba)
Safar 29 or 30	Death of Ali al-Rida
Rabi'-ul-Awwal 8	Death of Hasan al-Askari
Rabi'-ul-Awwal 17	Birth of Muhammad and Ja'far al-Sadiq
Jamaad-ath-Thaanee 3	Death of Fatima
Rajab 13	Birth of Ali
Rajab 27	Mission of Muhammad
Sha'aban 15	Birth of Mahdi
Ramadhan 21	Death of Ali
Shawwal 1	Eid ul-Fitr (End of Ramadhan)
Shawwal 2	Eid ul-Fitr (End of Ramadhan)
Shawwal 25	Death of Ja'far al-Sadiq
Dh-ul-Hajja 10	Eid ul-Adha (Ghurban)
Dh-ul-Hajja 18	Eid al-Ghadeer

== See also ==
- Student Day (Iran)
- Iranian calendar
- Al-Quds Day, the last Friday before the end of Ramadan
- Iranian festivals
- List of observances set by the Solar Hijri calendar
- List of observances set by the Islamic calendar
