= Dey (month) =

- Native name: دی (Persian); جدی (Dari); Befranbar (Kurdish); Дай / Ҷадӣ (Tajik)
- Calendar: Solar calendar
- Month number: 10
- Number of days: 30
- Season: Winter
- Gregorian equivalent: December-January

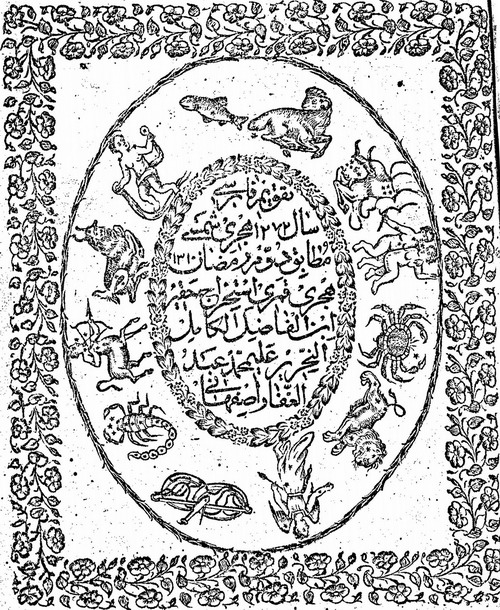
The cover of a Persian Almanac (Taqvim) created by Najm al-Dawlah Isfahani for the Solar Hijri year 1272 (roughly corresponding to 1893-1894 AD).

Dey (Persian: دی, Persian pronunciation: [dei̯]) is the tenth month of the Solar Hijri calendar, the official calendar of Iran and Afghanistan. It marks the start of winter. It has 30 days. It begins on 22 December and ends on 20 January in the Gregorian Calendar.

The associated astrological sign in the tropical zodiac is Capricorn.

The name is derived from Daθušō, "The Creator" (i.e. Ahura Mazda).

== Events ==
- 10 - 1363 - In a public ceremony in Bandar Seri Begawan, Sultan of Brunei Hassanal Bolkiah declares Brunei as a sovereign, independent nation.
- 5 - 1370 - Dissolution of the Soviet Union
- 6 - 1383 - Boxing Day tsunami
- 9 - 1388 - Conservative counterdemonstrations during 2009–10 Iranian election protests. Commemorated by hardline figures.
- 27 - 1345 - Super Bowl I held at the Los Angeles Memorial Coliseum in Los Angeles, California between the National Football League and the American Football League.
- 6 - 1404 - Kupiansk offensive: Russian war bloggers officially admit that Kupiansk is lost because of Ukrainian counteroffensive operations which result in the liberation of the city.
- 8 - 1404 - 2025-2026 Iran protests begins

== Deaths ==
- 5–1351 - Harry S. Truman, 33rd President of the United States
- 5–1385 - Gerald Ford, 38th President of the United States
- 13–1391 - Ayatollah Mojtaba Tehrani, was an Iranian Twelver Shi'a Marja' taqlid.
- 15–1311 - Calvin Coolidge, 30th President of the United States
- 15–1297 - Theodore Roosevelt, 26th President of the United States

== Observances ==
- Khorram rooz and Feast Day of Ahura Mazda - 1 Dey
- Christmas Eve - 3 or 4 Dey
- Christmas - 4 or 5 Dey, celebrated by Christians of Iranian descent who use the Gregorian Calendar (Georgian date: December 25)
- Boxing Day - 5 or 6 Dey
- New Year's Day (Gregorian calendar) - 11 or 12 Dey
- Zartosht No-Diso - 11 Dey (Zoroastrian holiday, one of the most holy days of Zoroastrianism)
- Traditional Epiphany and Armenian Christmas - 16 or 17 Dey
- Ethiopian Christmas - 17 or 18 Dey
- Feast of the Baptism of the Lord - 23 or 24 Dey (Traditional), fourth Sunday of Dey (modern)
- Traditional Epiphany (Julian Calendar) and Timkat - 29 or 30 Dey

For those countries that observe Epiphany on the first Sunday of January following the New Year, the Solar Hijri date falls as the third Sunday of Dey.
