= Sizdah Be-dar =

Iranian holiday

Sizdah Bedar
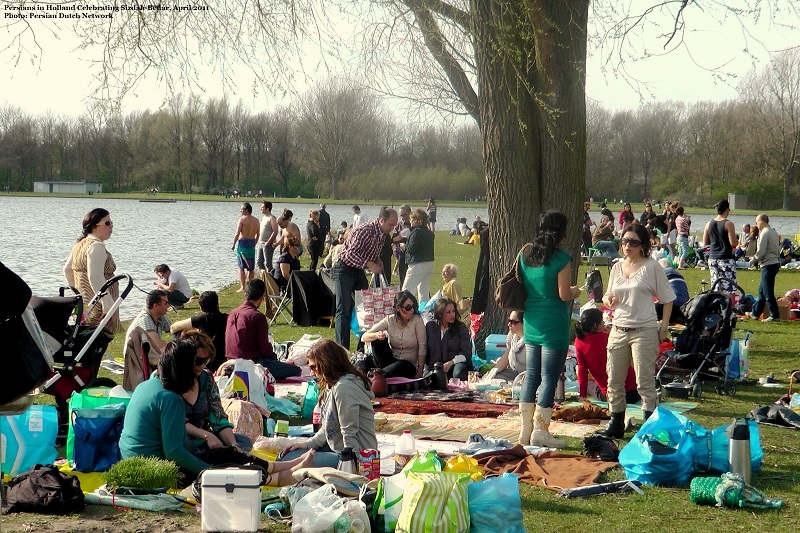
- Iranians in the Netherlands celebrating Sizdah Bedar, April 2011
- Observed by: Iran; Iranian diaspora
- Celebrations: Picnicking outdoors
- Date: Thirteen days after Nowruz
- 2025 date: 2 April
- 2026 date: 2 April
- 2027 date: 2 April
- Frequency: Annual
- Related to: Nowruz, Charshanbe Suri

Sizdah Bedar (Persian: سیزده‌بدر, romanized: sīzdæh bedar, lit. 'thirteen outdoor'), also known as Nature Day (روز طبیعت, rūz-e tabī'at), is an annual Iranian festival held thirteen days after Nowruz, which is on the thirteenth day of Farvardin, the first month of the Iranian calendar (and the first month of spring), during which people spend time picnicking outdoors. It marks the end of the Nowruz holidays in Iran. While it is celebrated thirteen days after Nowruz in Iran, it is generally celebrated on a weekend day near the thirteenth day by the Iranian diaspora.

== History ==
Generally, among Iranian festivals, "Sizdah Bedar" is a bit vague in terms of historical roots. There is no direct mention of such a celebration in history books prior to Qajar era. But in ancient sources, such as Shahnameh, there is a reference to "the thirteenth day of Farvardin". The popular belief is that ancient Iranians celebrated the 13th day of Nowruz after twelve days of celebrating, each day represents a month of the year. It was an official ending to Nowruz and a beginning to the remaining twelve months of the year.

=== Zoroastrian background ===
In ancient times, there was a name for each day of the month. For example, the first day of each month was called "Ormazd Rooz", and the thirteenth day of each month was called "Tir Rooz" and belonged to "Izad Tir" (the angel of Tir). The word "Rooz" means "day" in Persian. The word "Tir" is called "Tishtariah" in the Avestan language. It is the same as the name of Tishter, the angel of rain. So, we can say that Tir was a symbol of divine kindness among ancient Iranians because rain is symbolically equal to god's kindness and generosity in Persian culture. Nature Day is the ancient Persian tradition of celebrating the occasion of the god of rain's victory over the drought-inducing demon. Celebrating this day was customary even before the emergence of Asho Zoroastrianism (1800 BC).

As stated in the book From Nowruz to Nowruz by Mr. Kourosh Niknam (MP for Zoroastrianism), pp. 41 and 42, "the thirteenth day of Farvardin is called Tir or Teshtar." In Avesta, "Teshtar" is the angel of rain. Before Asho Zoroaster, for the rain angel to overcome the drought demon, people believed that they should ask this angel on this particular day for rain. In ancient Iran, after celebrating the 13th day of Nowruz, which was the beginning of an agricultural semi-year, Iranians went to their fields and farms or plains and deserts and the banks of rivers to request rain. They would rejoice and dance and happily asked for rain.

== Etymology ==
According to some Iranians’ belief the number thirteen is ominous. Sizdah Bedar, therefore, means "getting rid of the ominous of the day thirteen". Going on a picnic in the heart of nature and natural places is one way to do so. According to the Dehkhoda Dictionary, "dar" means "valley and plain" and "be" means "towards". Thus "Sizdah Bedar" means "towards the valley on the thirteenth day".

== Observances ==
Sizdah Be-dar is celebrated on the thirteenth day of Nowruz, the Iranian New Year. It is celebrated by going outside to be in nature and spend the day outdoors.

=== Releasing sprouted greens back into nature ===
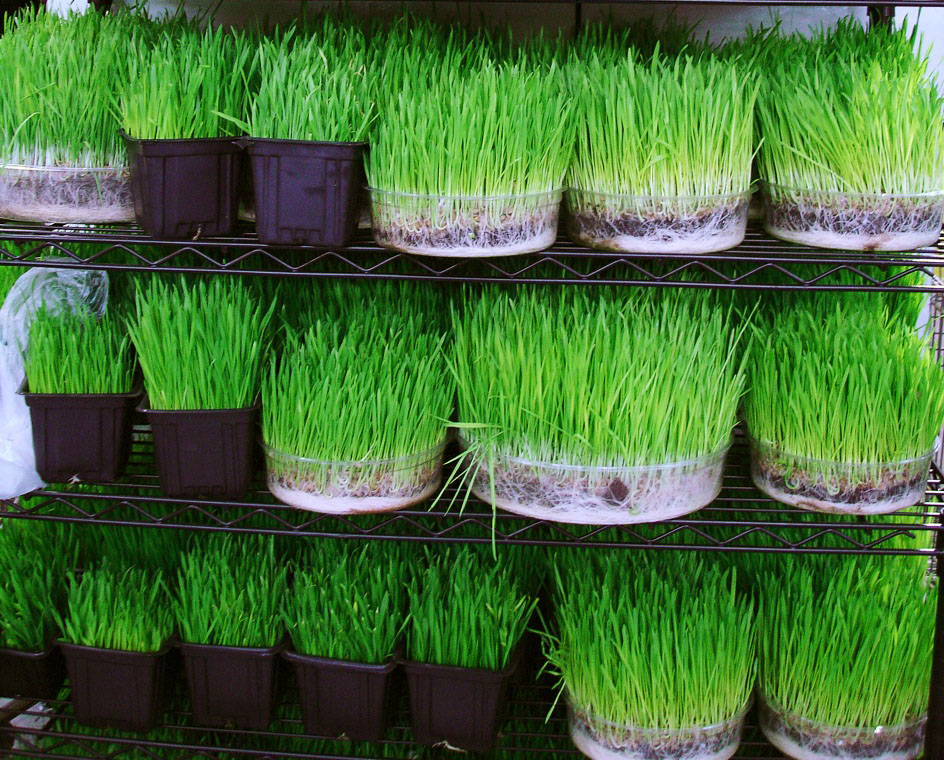
Greenery (Sabze) for Haft-Seen

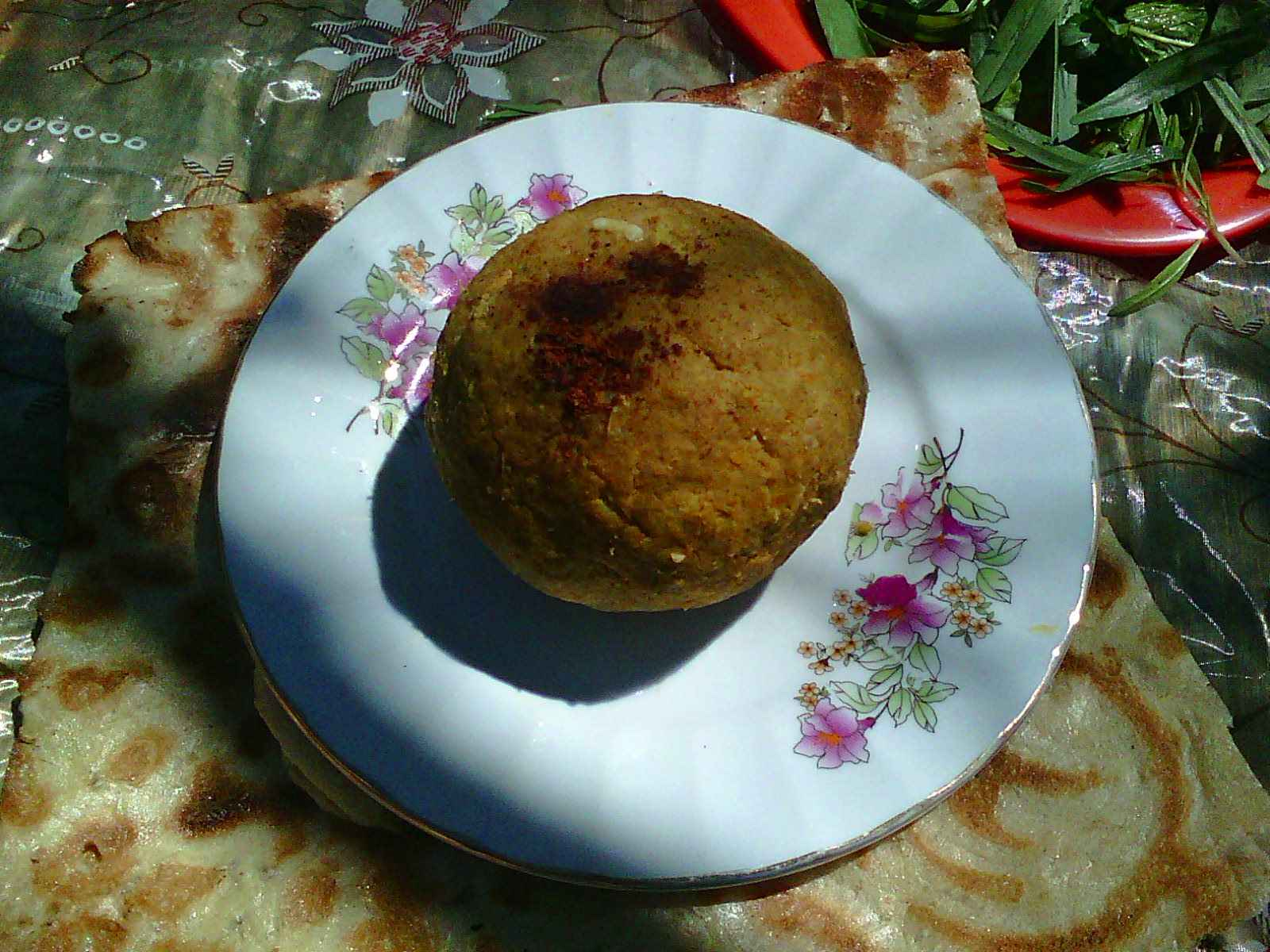
Special lunch 13 Be-dar

A custom performed at the end of the picnic is to throw the sprouted greens (سبزه – Sabze) that were part of the traditional Haft-Seen Nowruz display into moving water.

=== Knotting the greens ===
Knotting the stems of the greens (سبزه گره زدن – sabzeh gereh zadan) before tossing them into the water is a customary ritual for young single people, especially for young women. This commonly indicates a wish to find a partner or a husband, or a wish for anything.

=== Lie of the Thirteen ===
Lie of the Thirteenth (دروغ سیزده – dorūgh-e sīzdah), which is similar to April Fools' Day, is observed on the first or second day of April in Iran, on the day of Sizdah Bedar. Pranks have reportedly been played on this holiday since 536 BCE in the Achaemenid Empire.

== Food of Sizdah Bedar ==
=== Sekanjabin and lettuce ===
Sekanjabin is a very old Iranian drink. The Persians make it with vinegar, honey, and sometimes mint. It is very popular in summer, but it is also an inseparable part of Sizdah Bedar. Iranians eat lettuce with Sekanjabin. This act is symbolically a promise to stay healthy during the New Year.

=== Ash-e Doogh ===
Ash-e doogh, (Persian: آش دوغ), also known as "yogurt soup", originates from the Azeri region of northwest Iran and is one of the traditional soups of Ardabil. It is a common dish found in many regions and cultures within West Asia, including Iran, Azerbaijan, and Turkey.

== See also ==
- Nowruz
- Iranian festivals
- Public holidays in Iran
