= Lorestan province =

Province of Iran

Lorestan Province استان لرستان (Persian)
- Province
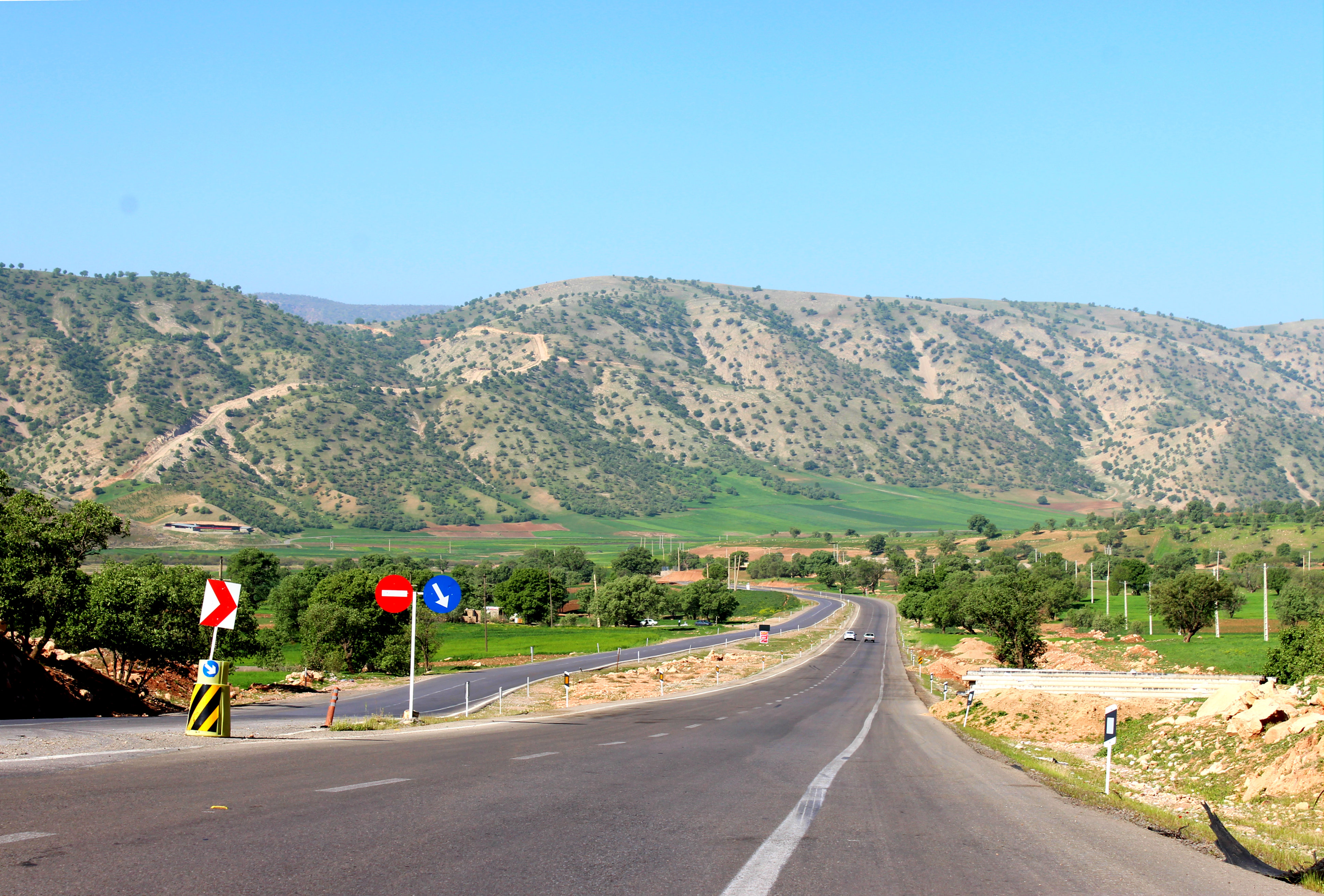
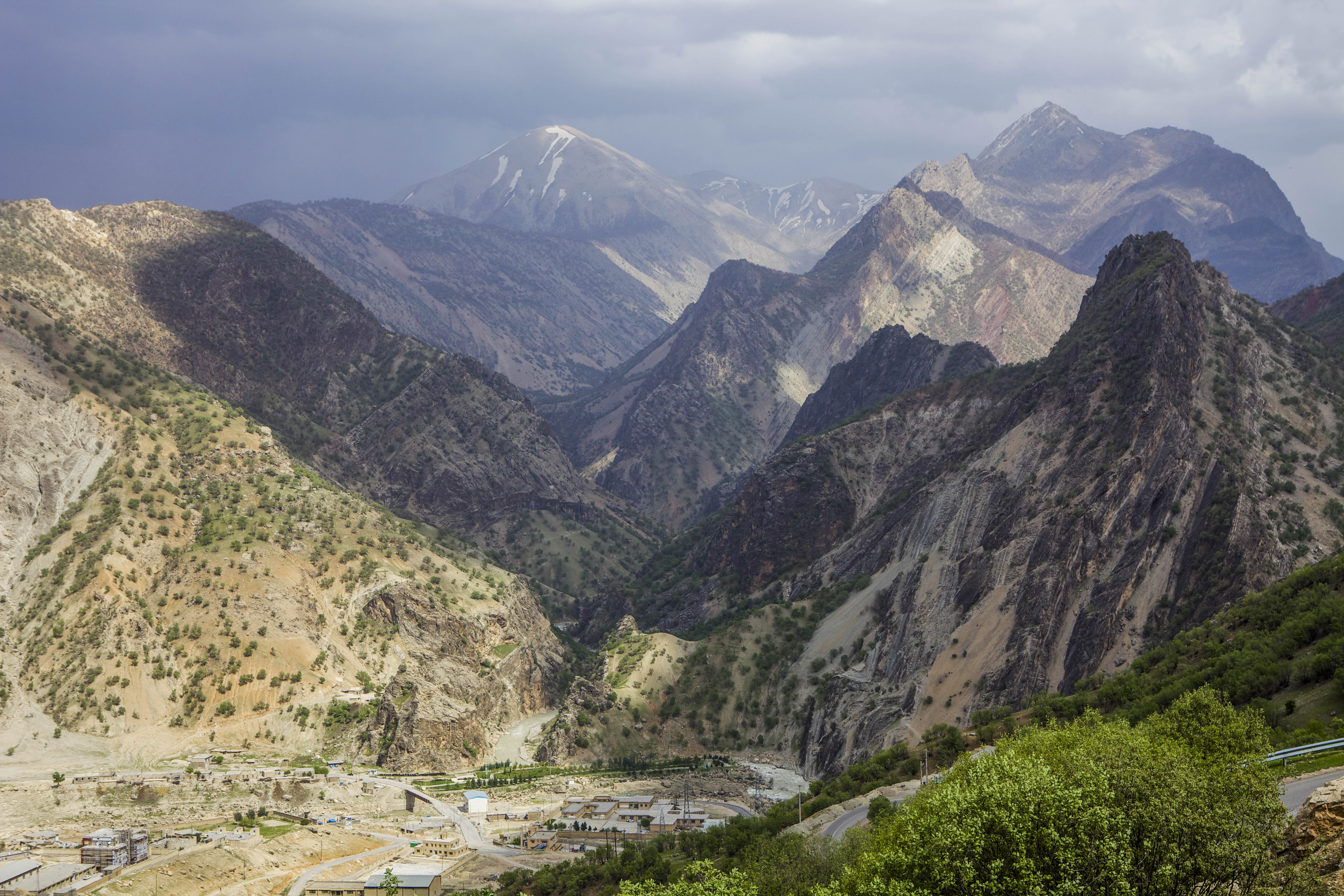
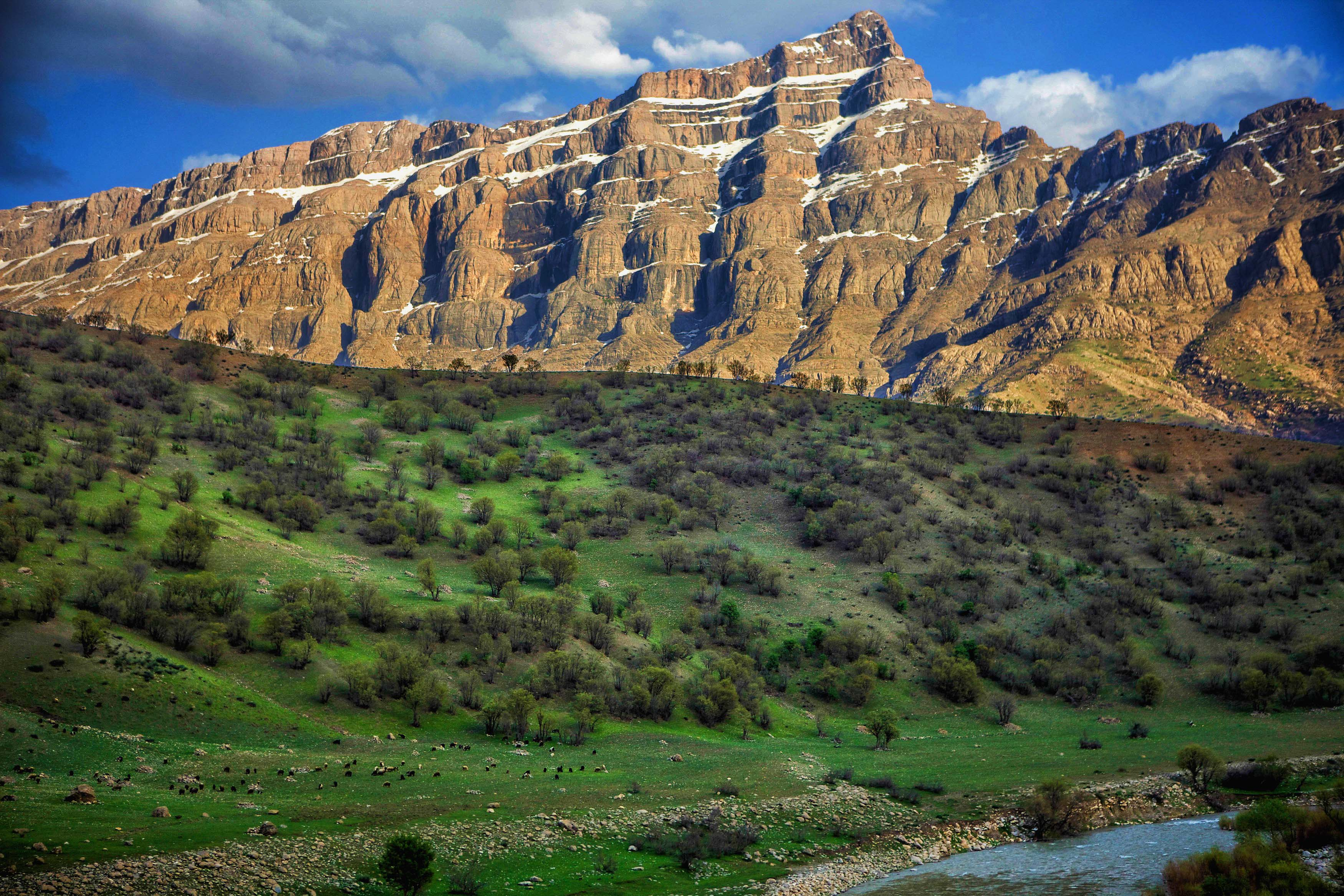
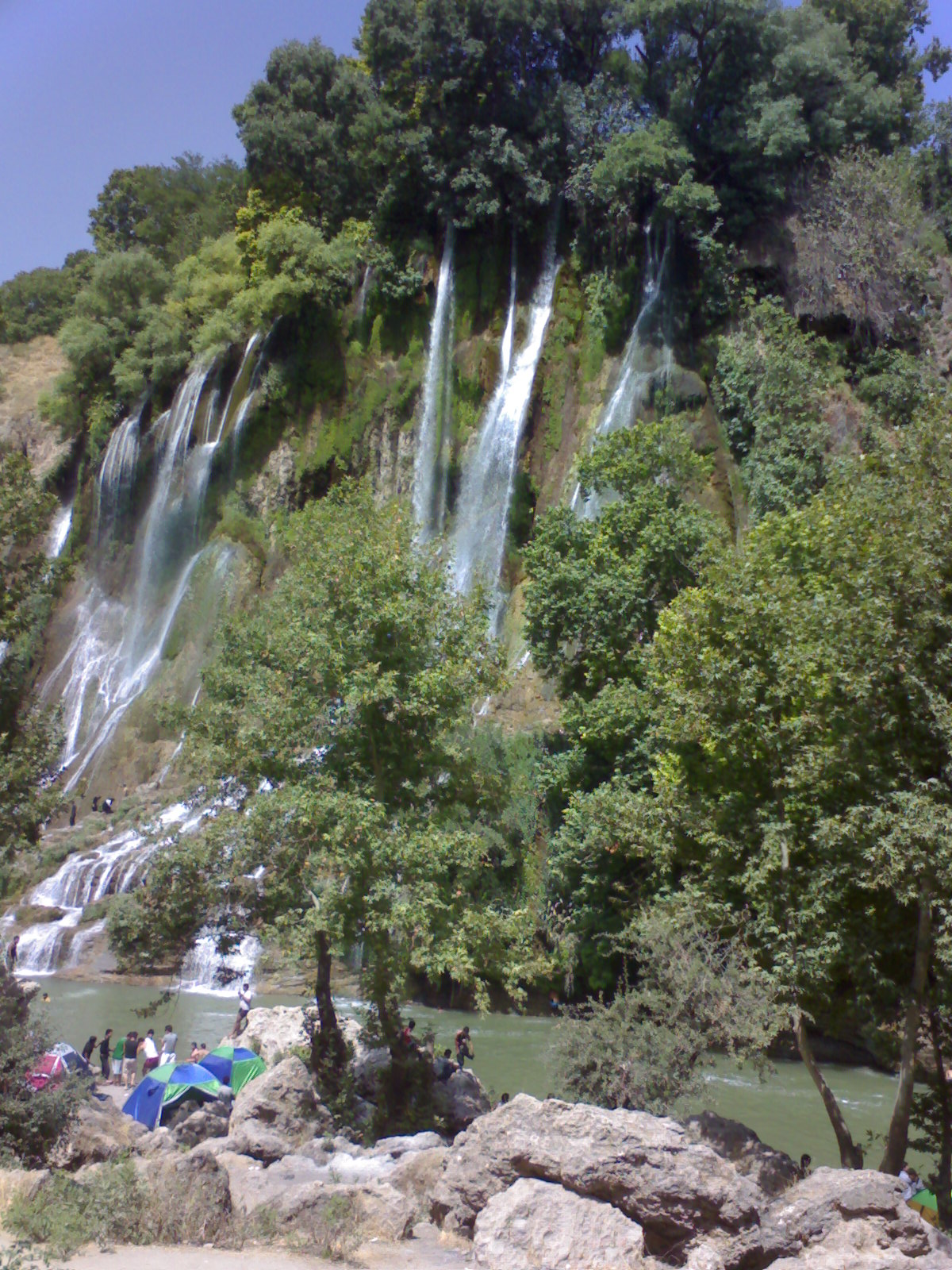
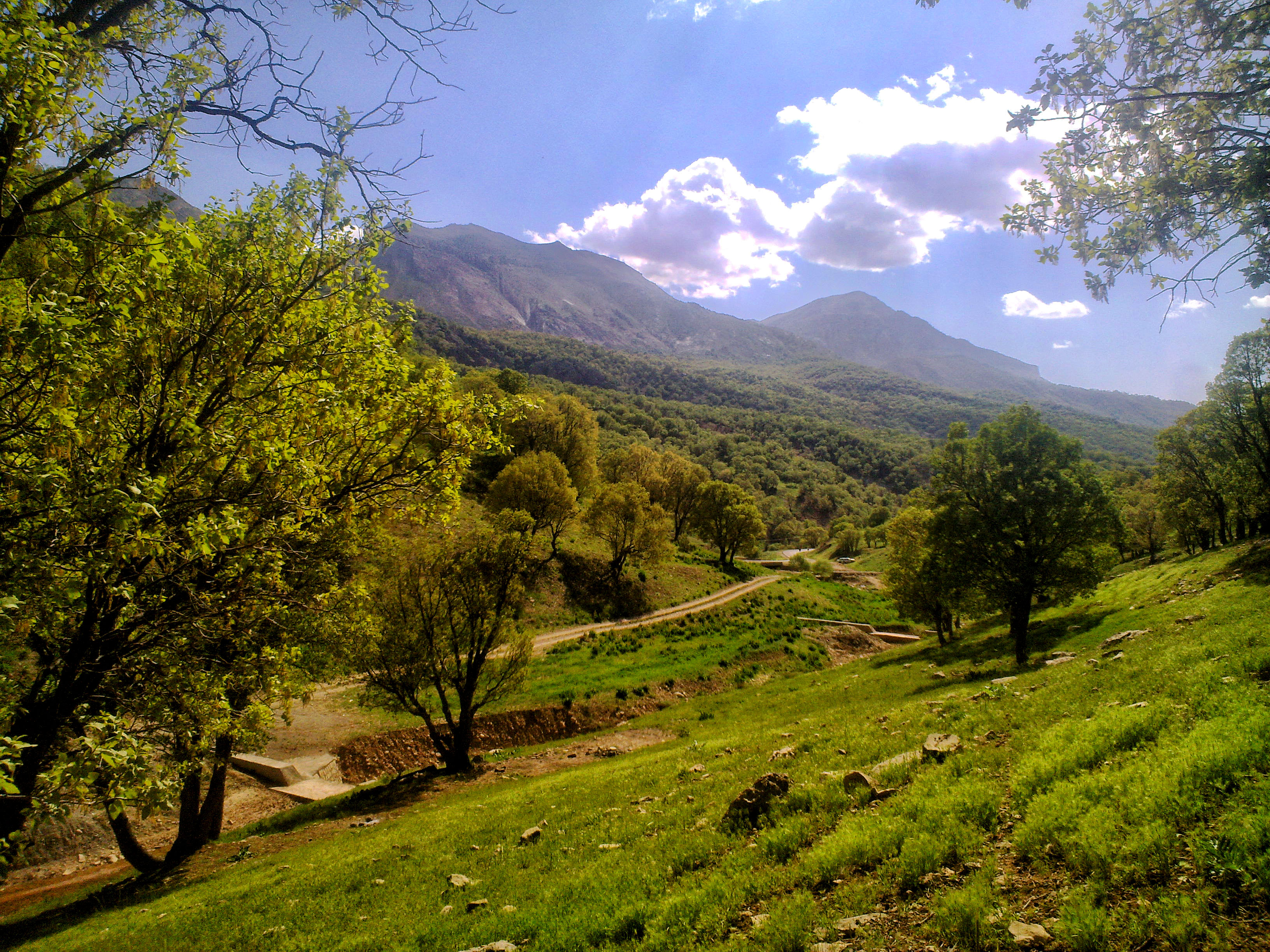
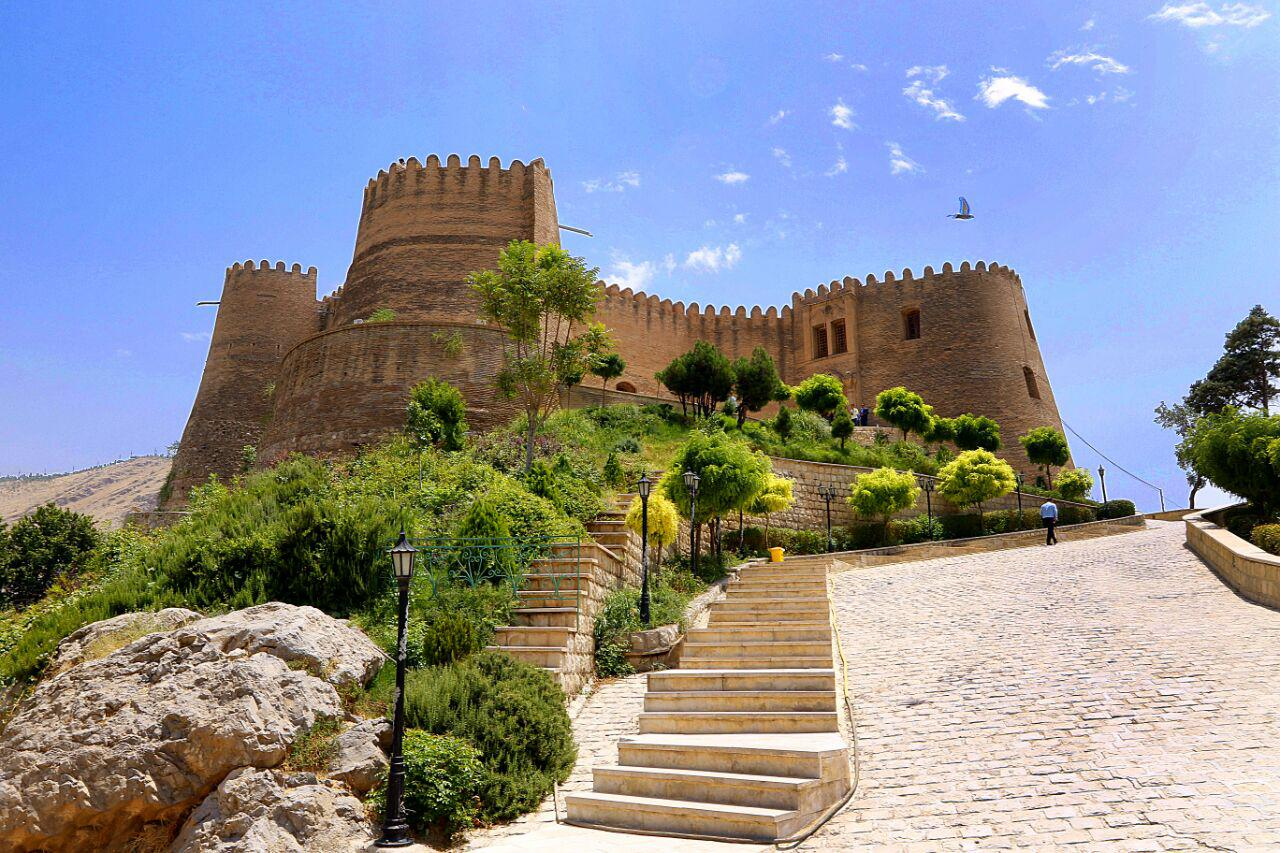
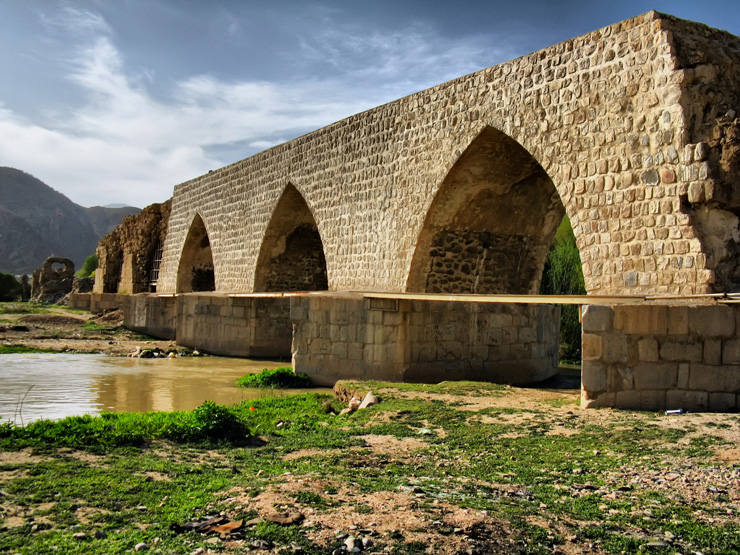
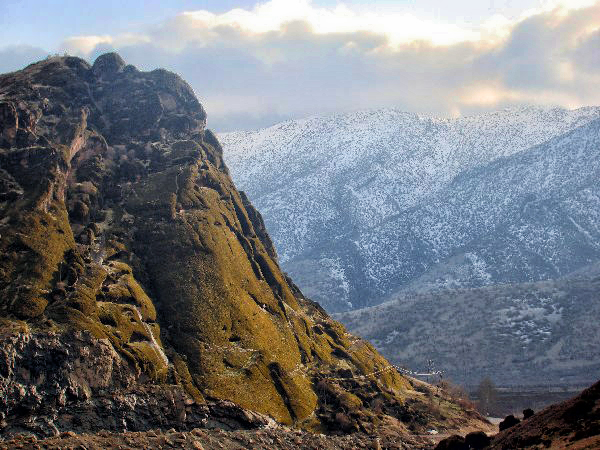
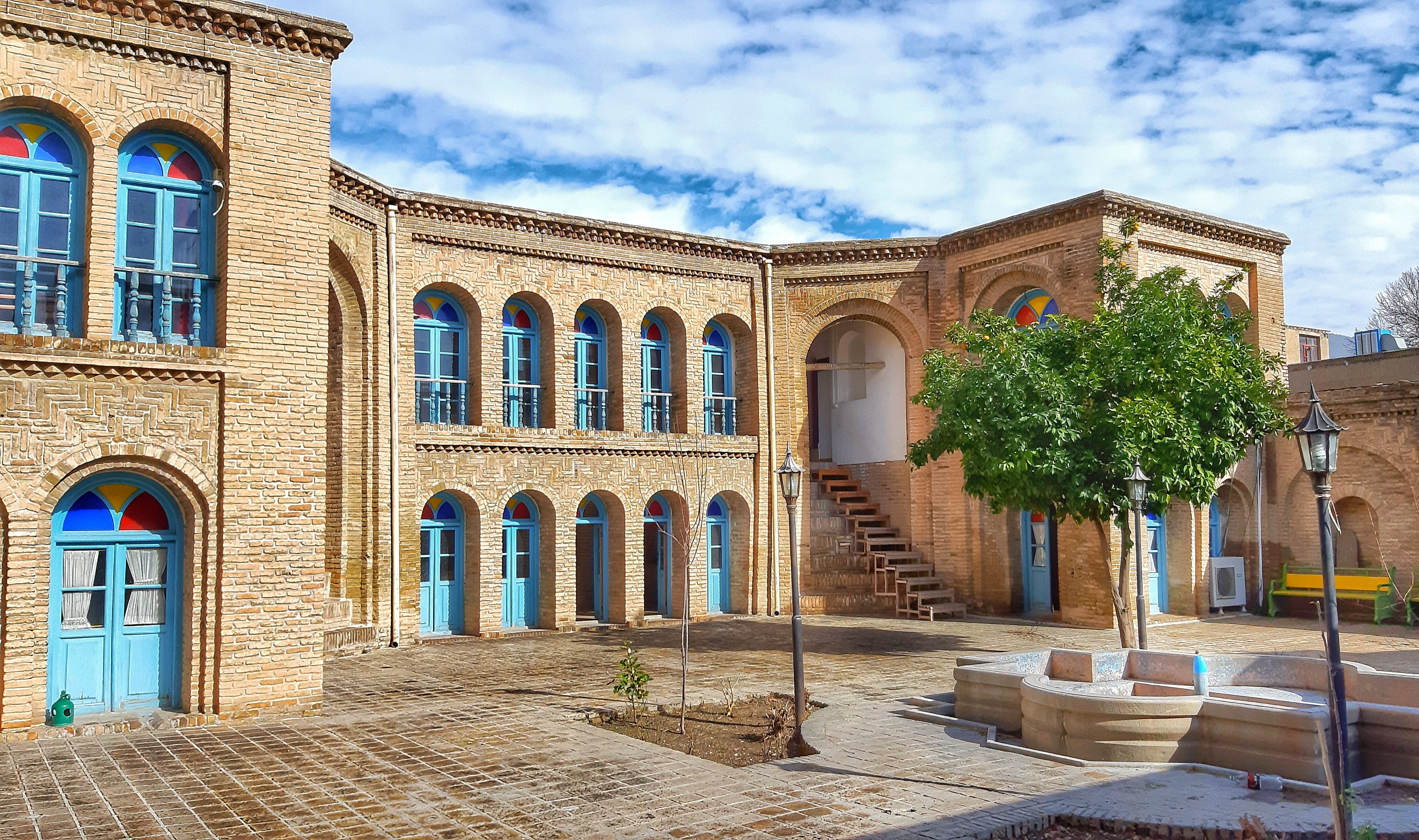
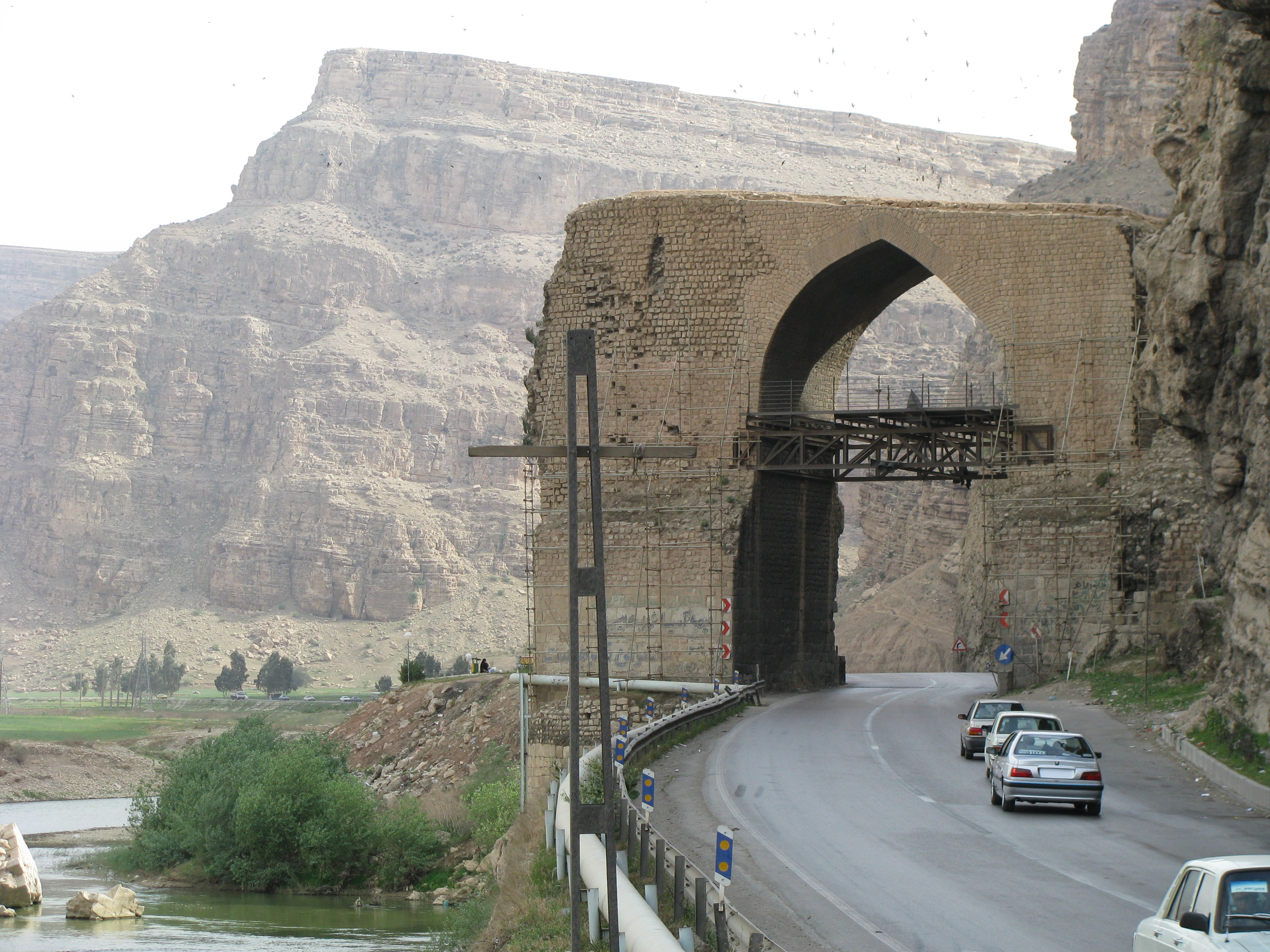

- Location of Lorestan Province within Iran
- Coordinates: 33°34′N 48°24′E
- Country: Iran
- Region: Region 4
- Capital: Khorramabad
- Counties: 12

Government
  - Governor-general: Saeed Shahrokhi

Area
  - Total: 28,294 km^{2} (10,924 sq mi)

Population (2016)
  - Total: 1,760,649
  - Density: 62.227/km^{2} (161.17/sq mi)
- Demonym: لرستانی (Lorestani)
- Time zone: UTC+03:30 (IRST)
- Area code: 066
- Main language(s): Luri, Laki
- HDI (2017): 0.779 high · 19th

Lorestan province (Persian: استان لرستان) (Note: Also romanized as Ostān-e Lorestān, Loristan, Lurestan, or Luristan) is one of the 31 provinces of Iran. Its capital is the city of Khorramabad.

Lorestan is in the western part of the country in the Zagros Mountains and covers an area of 28,392 km^{2}. In 2014 it was placed in Region 4.

Lorestan is located close to the border with Iraq. Situated in a scenic valley surrounded by mountains, Lorestan lies approximately 100 kilometers (about 62 miles) east of the Iraqi border.

== Etymology ==
The name Lorestan means "land of the Lurs."

== History ==
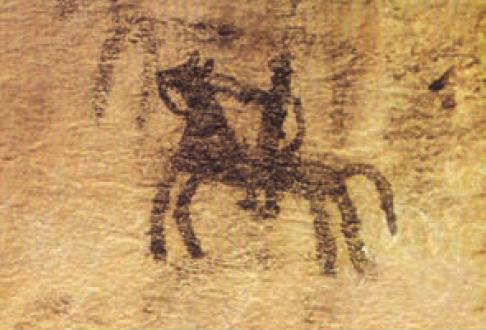
Cave painting in Doushe cave, Lorestan

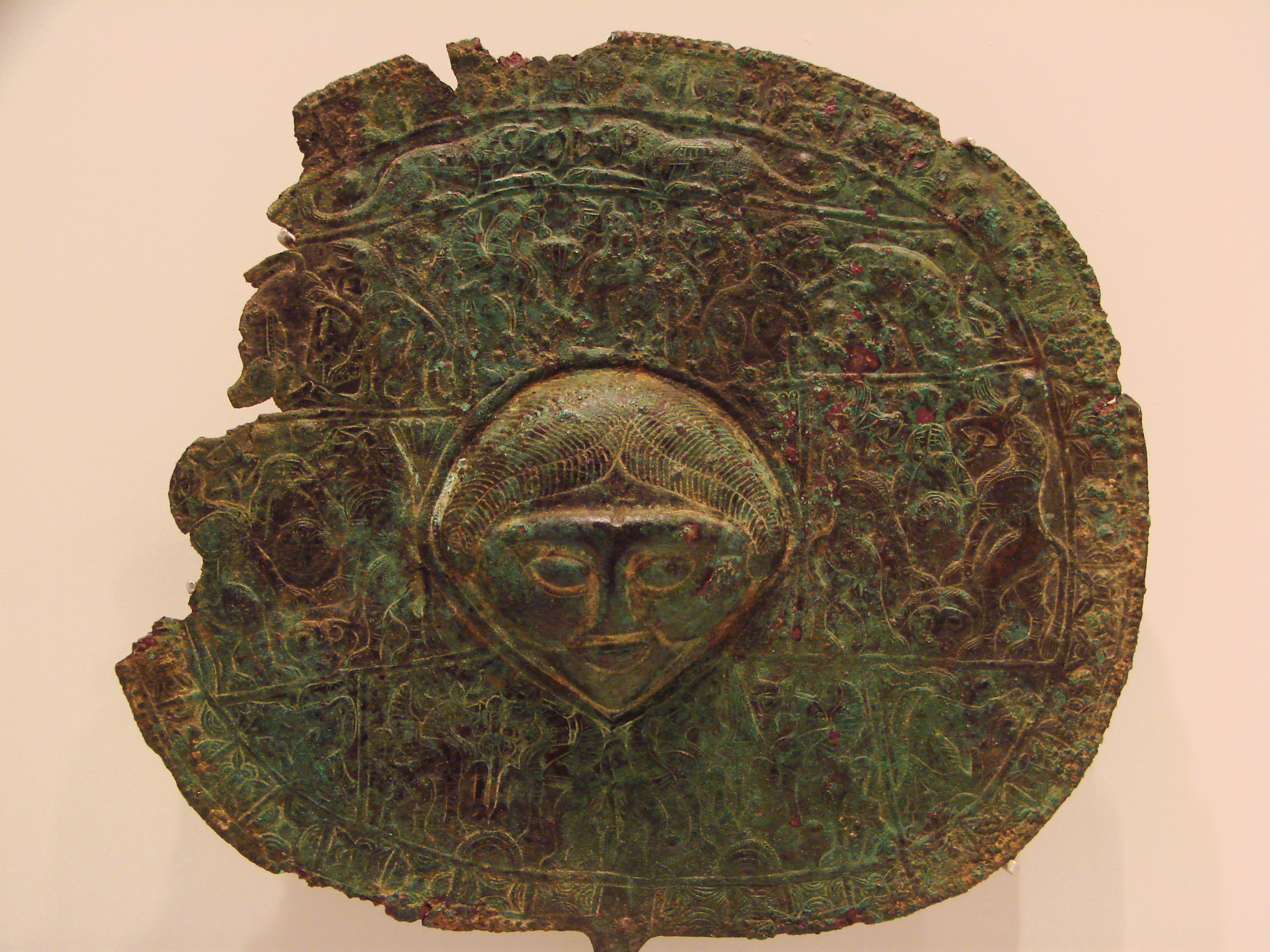
Disc-headed pin depicting a female figure as decoration. Found in Lorestan, Rietberg Museum, Zurich

The ancient history of Lorestan is closely intertwined with the rest of the Ancient Near East. In the 3rd and 4th millennium BC, migrant tribes settled down in the mountainous area of the Zagros Mountains. The Kassites, an ancient people who spoke neither an Indo-European nor a Semitic language, originated in Lorestān. They would control Babylonia after the fall of the Old Babylonian Empire ca. 1531 BC and until ca. 1155 BC.

Parts of Luristan were invaded and settled by the Iranian Medes in the 2nd millennium BC. The Medes absorbed the indigenous inhabitants of the region, primarily the Kassites as well as the Gutians, by the time the area was conquered by the Persians in the 1st millennium BC. In February 2017, archeological discoveries related to the Achaemenid era were made in Lorestan for the first time.

=== Luristan bronze ===
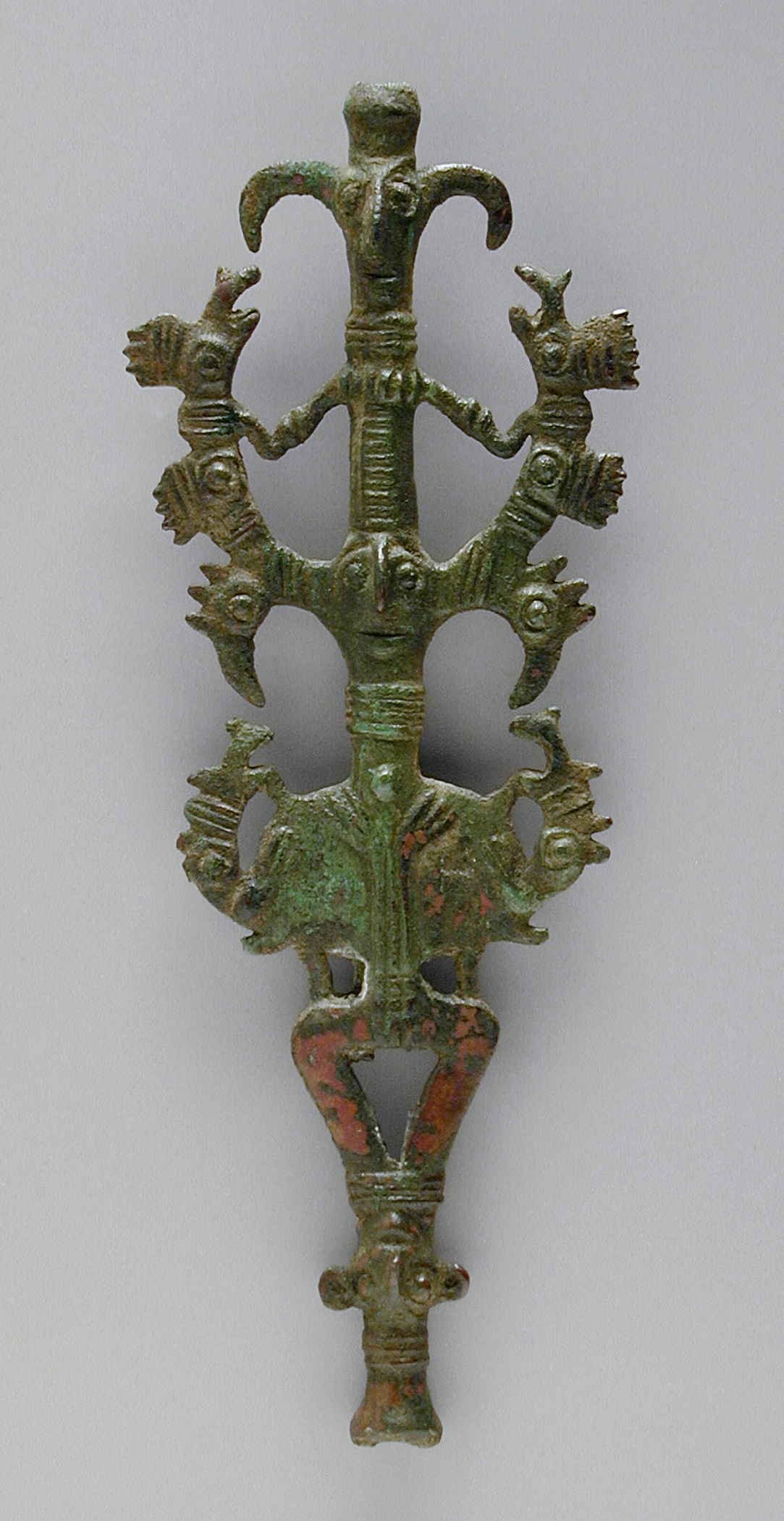
Luristan bronze with Master of Animals, 9th-8th century BC.

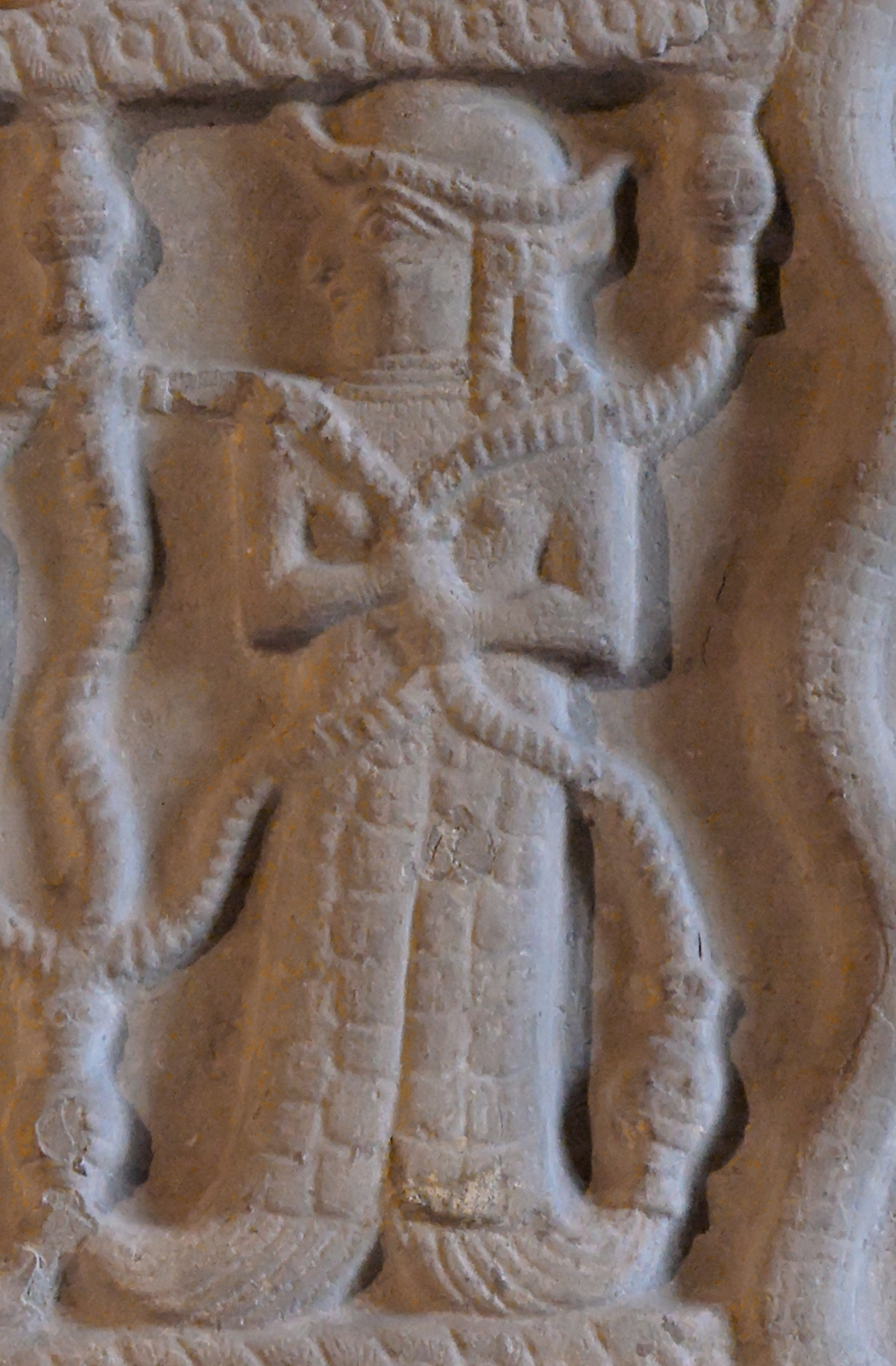
Relief resembles a fish tailed woman holding snakes (Elamite era).

Small Luristan bronze artworks, usually dated about 1000 to 650 BC, reached the outside world from the late 1920s and are found in museums all over the world, where they are valued for their vigorous style, with many representations of animals. But actually, the beginning of this bronze-making tradition goes back to the mid–3rd millennium BC.

Archaeologists characterized these techniques by the metallurgical analysis of different artifacts,

We have characterized these practices by the compositional and metallurgical analysis of grave goods from several cemeteries in the region including six dating to different phases of the Bronze Age (Early Dynastic I to Ur ED III, circa 2900–2000 BC)—Kalleh Nisar, Bani Surmah, Chigha Sabz, Kamtarlan, Sardant, and Gulal-i Galbi—and four dating to different phases of the Iron Age (circa 1300 B.C.–600 B.C.)—Bard-i Bal, Kutul-i Gulgul, Sar Kabud, and War Kabud.

Technically, the term 'Luristan bronze' usually refers only to the later bronze objects, although they have many similarities. The earlier bronze objects were made during the Elam period.

Lorestan was successfully integrated into the Achaemenid, Parthian and Sasanian empires. Parts of the region managed to stay independent during the Arab, Seljuk and Mongol invasions.

=== Kurdish rule (959–1597) ===
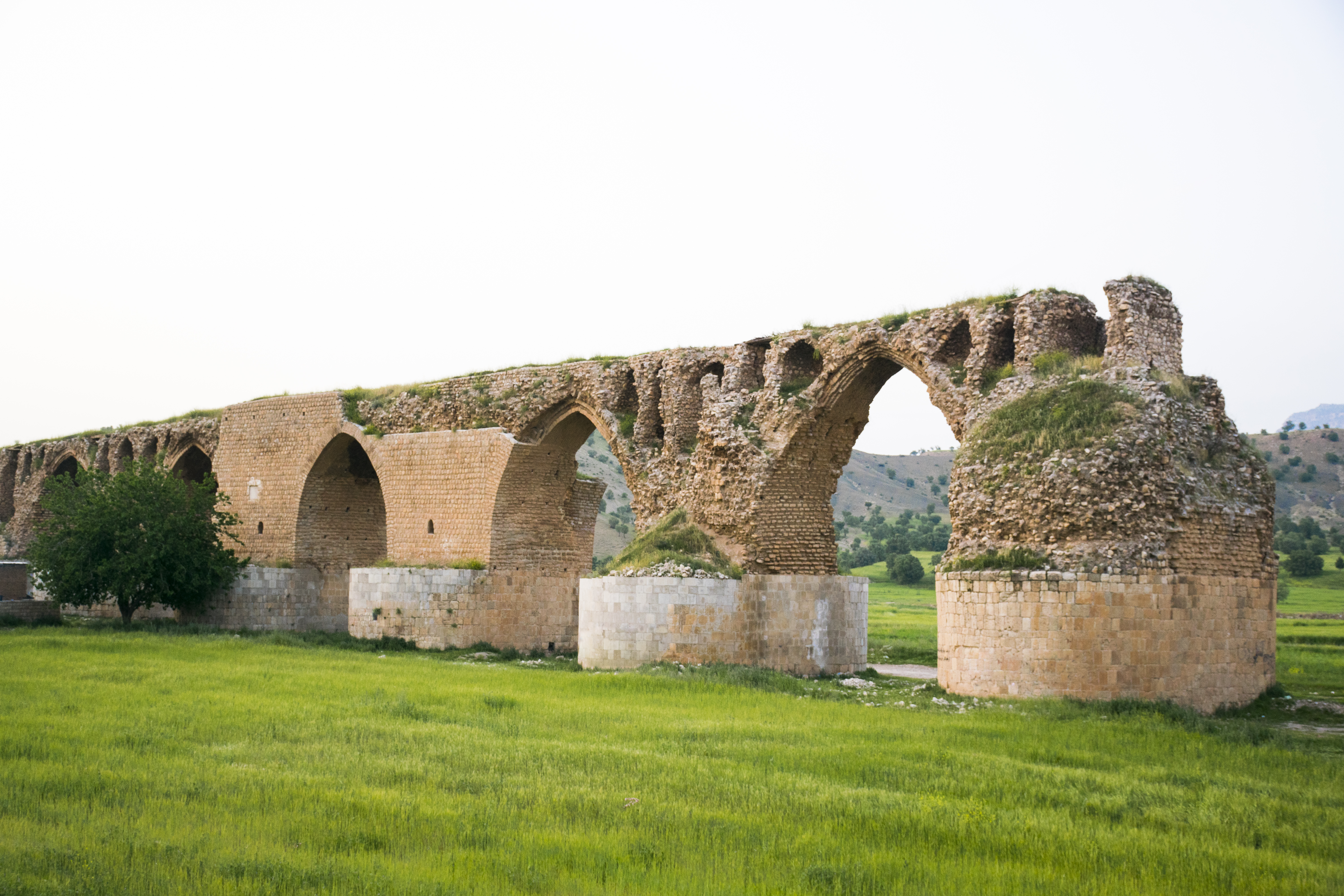
Kashkan Bridge, built during Hasanwayhid rule in Lorestan.

=== Qajar era (1794–1925) ===
Agha Mohammad Khan Qajar of the Qajar dynasty was an ardent antagonist of the people of Lorestan and the dynasty applied a policy of divide and rule (nefāq afkanī) for the region where they would pit tribes against each other. When Agha Mohammad Khan took over Iran by defeating the Zand dynasty, he instated non-local governor-generals, princes and other personalities who were never native to Lorestan. Moreover, the governor-generals of Lorestan never had sufficient armed forces to their disposal to maintain order and collect taxes.

The Qajar dynasty would ultimately have a devastating impact on Lorestan including on its territorial integrity, economic decline, political instability, reduction of settled communities and increased pastoral nomadism. Pastoral nomadism increased because the Qajars were unable to maintain law and order, which in turn strengthened tribal autonomy and tribal self-determination, while it meant that the settled population had to protect their lives and property themselves. During this period, the nomadic pastoralist tribes would take over crown land and lands owned by urbanists, pushing the settled rural population who had no control over their properties or farm products to either join the pastoral nomads or leave their villages. The Khorrambad plains were taken by the Baharvand tribe.

Visiting the region in 1917, Cecil J. Edmonds noted that Khorramabad was the only city in the province and that all villages had been ruined or deserted. When Rawlinson had visited the area in 1836, he contrarily noted: "After breakfast I rode into Khorramabad, a distance of 5 miles from the foot of the hills, through a richly cultivated district thronged with villages and garden".

=== Pahlavi Iran (1920s–1979) ===
==== Conquest of Lorestan ====
The establishment of Pahlavi Iran by Reza Shah in the 1920s demanded a change in the traditional relationship between the state and the locals. This demand for change resulted in a war in the spring of 1922 and subsequently the subjugation of the locals. While having support among the urban population along with the leaders of the Sagvand and Baharvand tribes, many tribal leaders were skeptical of a returning state power to Lorestan.

In a statement to the tribesmen in Lorestan in 1924, the Shah stated that he equated nomadic pastoralism to savagery and the tribal way of life as an obstacle to modernization and progress. Conquering the anarchic Lorestan was important to the Shah economically, politically, militarily and symbolically and is also paved the way for the state to conquer Khuzestan. No reliable sources exist on the capture of Lorestan and no mention of the atrocities against the local population nor the assistance of some tribes for the Shah.

The Laki-speaking Beiranvand was the most troublesome tribe for the state and confrontations between the tribe and state took place in the Silakhor Plain near Borujerd in late spring of 1922. Other tribes did not confront the Pahlavi forces due to disunity, while the governor of Lorestan believed it was inappropriate for him to confront the Shah because he was a state representative. Nevertheless, he did not support Shah rule over Lorestan who he considered a debased Cossack.

In December 1923, the small army of the Shah (around 2,500 men) advanced toward Khorramabad but its first column was fully wiped out by the Beirvanvand tribe and their arms and ammunition was looted. The second column succeeded in breaking the siege on Khorramabad and was welcomed by the local population as the tribes were at their winter territories faraway from the city. The new state would appoint local people as officials including the most powerful man in Lorestan who was appointed governor of Tarhan District and Shir Mohammad Khan of the Sagvand tribe was asked to be advisor for the governor and the army.

The Baharvand leaders worked hard to prevent any confrontation between the army and the tribes but General Ahmadi went ahead with executions resulting in bloodshed and a continuation of hostilities. Both leaders from the rebellious Beiranvand and tribal leaders who had supported the Shah against the Beiranvand were executed. The Beiranvand tribe would consequently rebel again while other tribes avoided continued confrontation despite being distrustful to the new state. Other tribes who did rebel were the Kurdish Chegini tribe and the Romani. They were successful as they fought, defeated and looted the army.

The news angered General Shah Bakhti who chose to send his own force to the region, but his men never reached Khorramabad as the Chegini caught and beat him, and moreover killed around 120 of his men. The defeat and humiliation of the army reached the Beiranvands who then urged for a unified tribal attack against the army and received support from the Papi, Baharvand, Chegini tribes and half of the Judaki tribe.

These tribes collectively attacked Khorramabad in late May 1924 and drove the army into the fortresses in the city as they suffered large casualties again with armaments taken by the tribes. The tribes then sieged the city for 38 days which forced General Shah Bakhti to retreat to Borujerd with the blessing of the Shah. However, the leader of the Sagvands persuaded the General to not retreat as the army would be wiped out and noted that the tribes could not fight for a long time because of the shortage of ammunition and lack of provisions. During this period, the army received endless support from the population of Khorramabad.

By June 1924, General Ahmadi was dispatched with his army to Khorramabad and began fighting the tribes but with no results. During the siege, consultations were taking place between tribe and the state to end the conflict and the Baharvand tribe was the first tribe to withdraw from the tribal alliance due to a dispute over captured cannon and other matters. The Judaki, Papi and Chegini would follow suit forcing the Beiranvand tribe to withdraw as well. The subsequent conquest of Lorestan is attributed to the alliance of the Shah with some dedicated tribes. Reza Shah visited Lorestan in the summer of 1924 as he was planning on attacking Khuzestan and some tribes including the Sagvand would enter Dezful with the army without any incident.

== 1979 – present ==
In late December 2025, the city of Noorabad experienced high tensions, as the population joined the protests that spread throughout Iran, following the economic crisis.

=== Historical maps ===
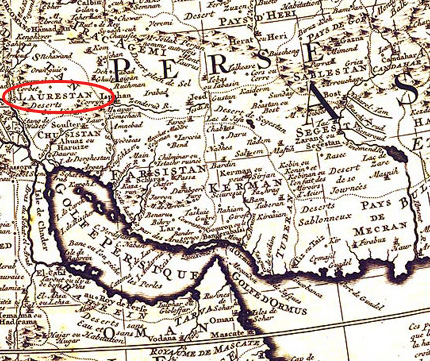
Luristan in 1706–08.

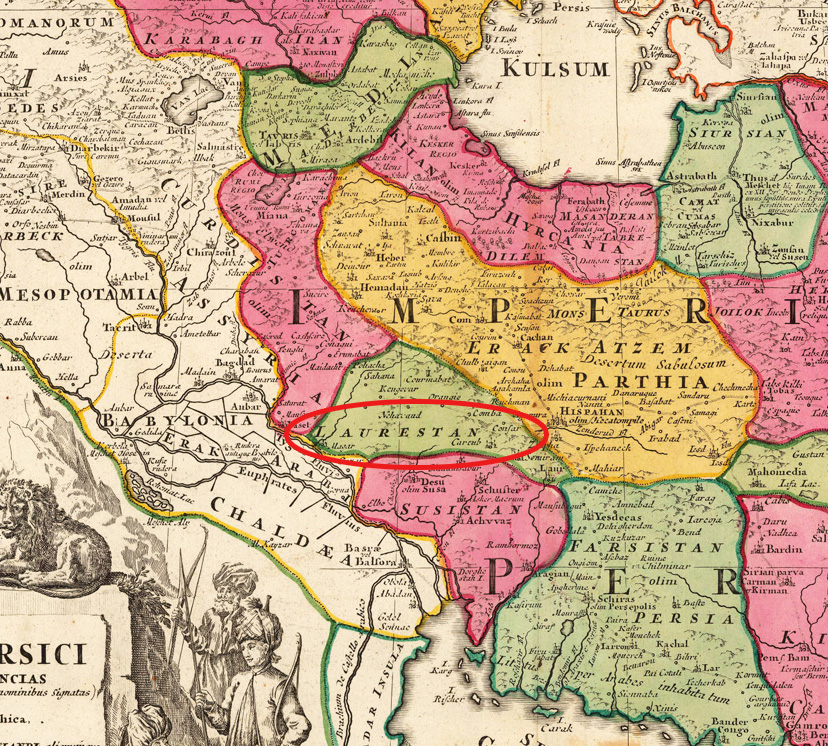
Luristan in 1720.

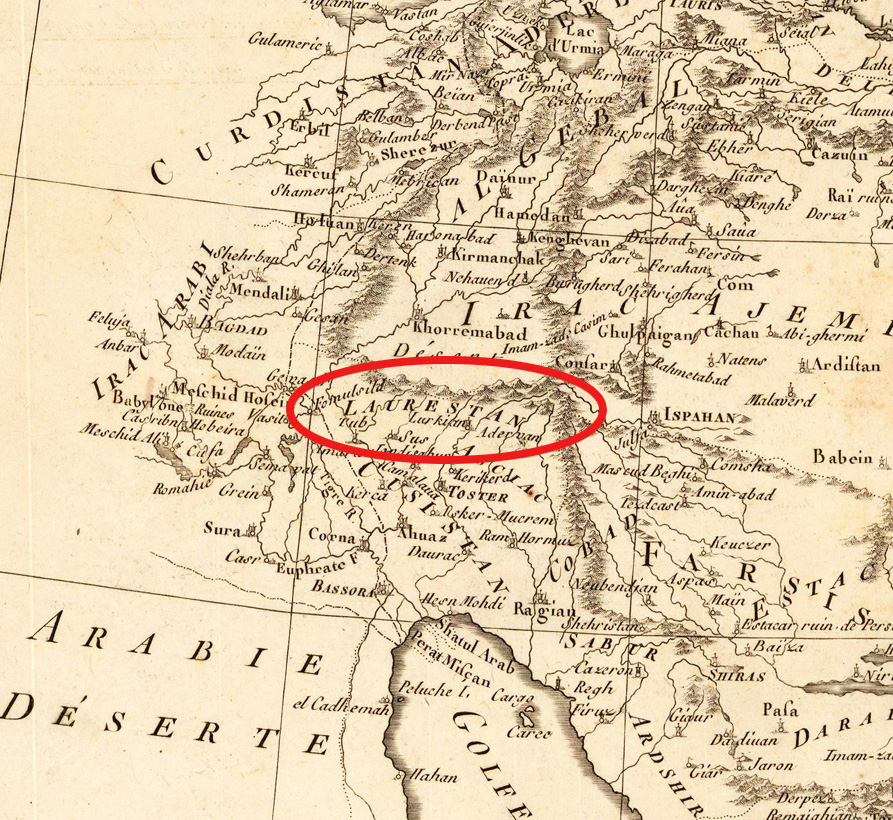
Luristan in 1780–90.

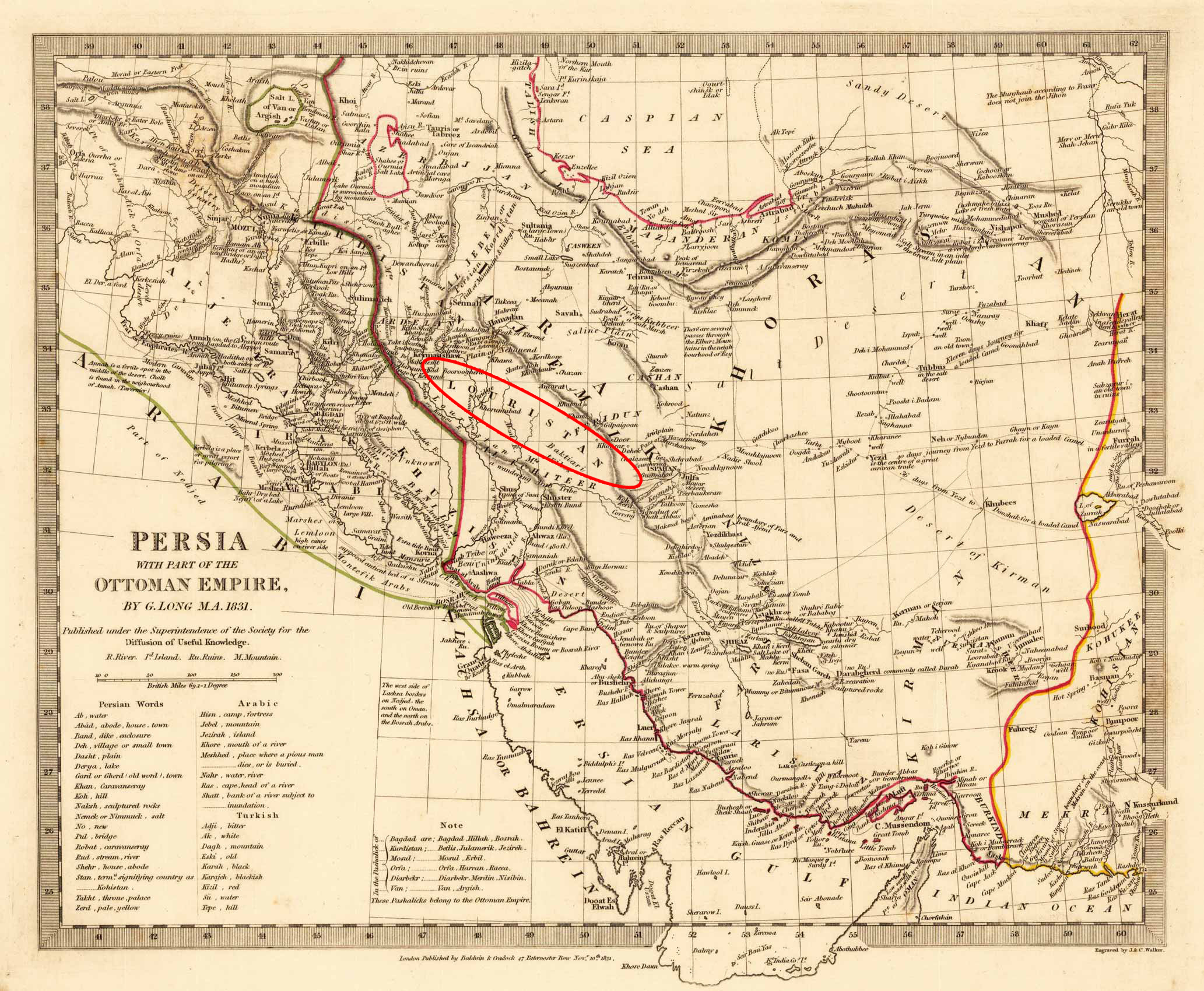
Luristan in 1831.

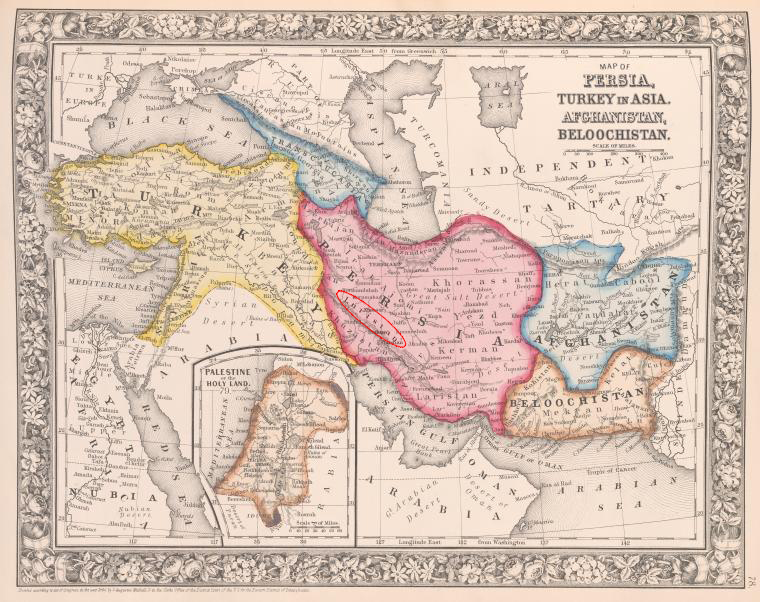
Luristan in 1863, c1860.

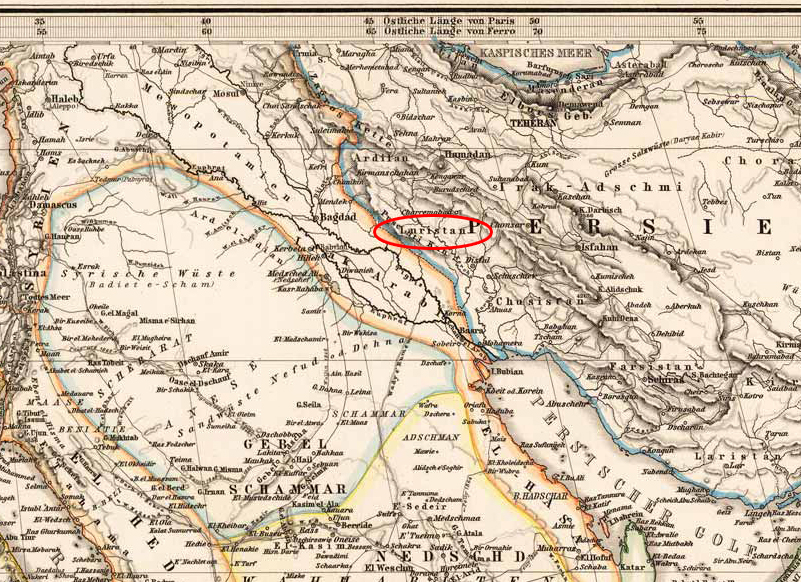
Luristan in 1875.

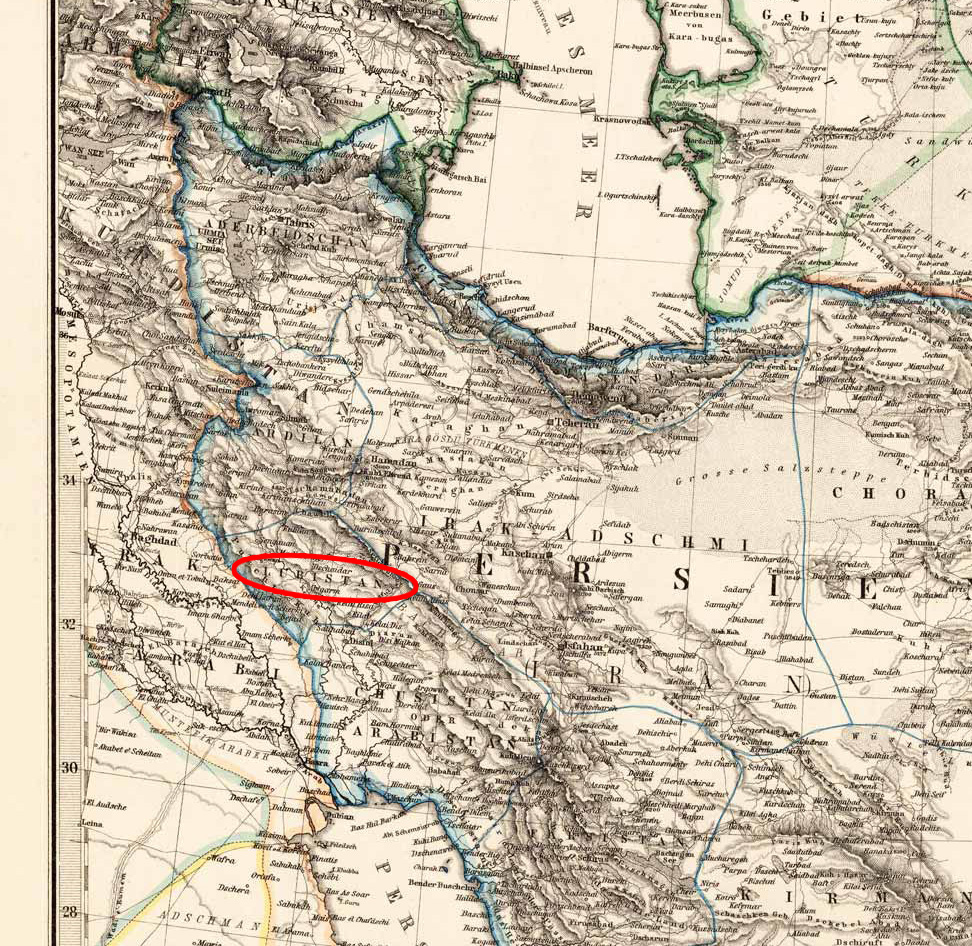
Luristan 1875.

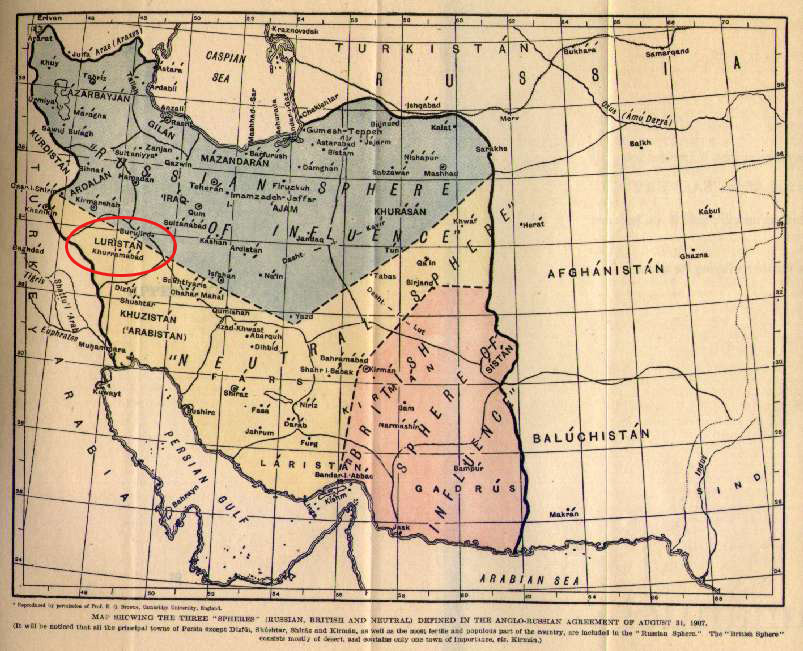
Luristan in The Russo-British Pact in 1907.

== Demographics ==
=== Language and ethnicity ===
Linguistic composition of the province in 2023:

Lorestan linguistic composition
Language	percent
Laki	27.92%
Northern Lori	25.42%
Persian	21.65%
North Zagros	12.44%
Bakhtiari	11.16%
Turkic	0.75%
Mixed	0.66%

==== Lurs ====
Lorestan province is one of the main settlements of the Lur people and the Northern variety Luri language is the main language of the province. Northern Luri is also spoken in southern Ilam and Khuzestan provinces.

Lurs form the majority of the population of Khorramabad, the largest city and the capital of the province, Borujerd and Dorud, the second and the third largest cities of the province respectively. Khorramabad is also the largest Luri-speaking city in Iran and the world.

==== Kurds ====
The northern part of Lorestan is populated by the Kurds of the Lak tribe who were estimated to constitute over 65% of the population in the province in 1980. Laks live in the Delfan, Dowreh and Selseleh counties which are populated by various subtribes including the Chegini, Itivand, Kakavand, Nurali and Papi. Oshtorinan District in Borujerd County is moreover populated by the Hasanvand tribe.

Aligudarz County, Azna County, Kuhdasht County, Khorramabad County and Pol-e Dokhtar County are ethnically mixed and populated by both Kurdish and Luri tribes.

==== Others ====
There were also Bakhtiaris around Dorud and Aligudarz, and Turkic enclaves in Borujerd, Aligudarz, and Azna.

=== Population ===
At the time of the 2006 National Census, the province's population was 1,689,650 in 382,805 households. The 2011 national census counted 1,754,243 residents in 462,260 households. The 2016 census measured the population of the province as 1,760,649 inhabitants in 509,025 households.

=== Administrative divisions ===

The population history and structural changes of Lorestan Province's administrative divisions over three consecutive censuses are shown in the following table.

Lorestan province
Counties	2006	2011	2016
Aligudarz	134,802	140,275	137,534
Azna	70,462	71,586	74,936
Borujerd	320,547	337,631	326,452
Chegeni (Note: Separated from Khorramabad County after the 2006 census and named Dowreh County; renamed Chegeni County in 2019)	—	43,221	41,756
Delfan	137,385	144,161	143,973
Dorud	159,026	162,800	174,508
Khorramabad	509,251	487,167	506,471
Kuhdasht	209,821	218,921	166,658
Mamulan (Note: Separated from Pol-e Dokhtar County after the 2016 census)	—	—	—
Pol-e Dokhtar	74,537	75,327	73,744
Rumeshkan (Note: Separated from Kuhdasht County after the 2011 census)	—	—	39,058
Selseleh	73,819	73,154	75,559
Total	1,689,650	1,754,243	1,760,649

=== Cities ===
According to the 2016 census, 1,134,908 people (over 64% of the population of Lorestan Province) live in the following cities:

City	Population
Aleshtar	33,558
Aligudarz	89,268
Azna	47,489
Bayranshahr	1,720
Borujerd	234,997
Chalanchulan	2,223
Chaqabol	6,125
Darb-e Gonbad	2,131
Dorud	121,638
Firuzabad	3,399
Garab	3,295
Haft Cheshmeh	870
Khorramabad	373,416
Kuhdasht	89,091
Kunani	7,768
Mamulan	7,656
Momenabad	1,821
Nurabad	65,547
Oshtorinan	5,520
Pol-e Dokhtar	26,352
Sarab-e Dowreh	1,713
Sepiddasht	2,917
Shulabad	1,531
Veysian	2,087
Zagheh	2,776

== Geography ==
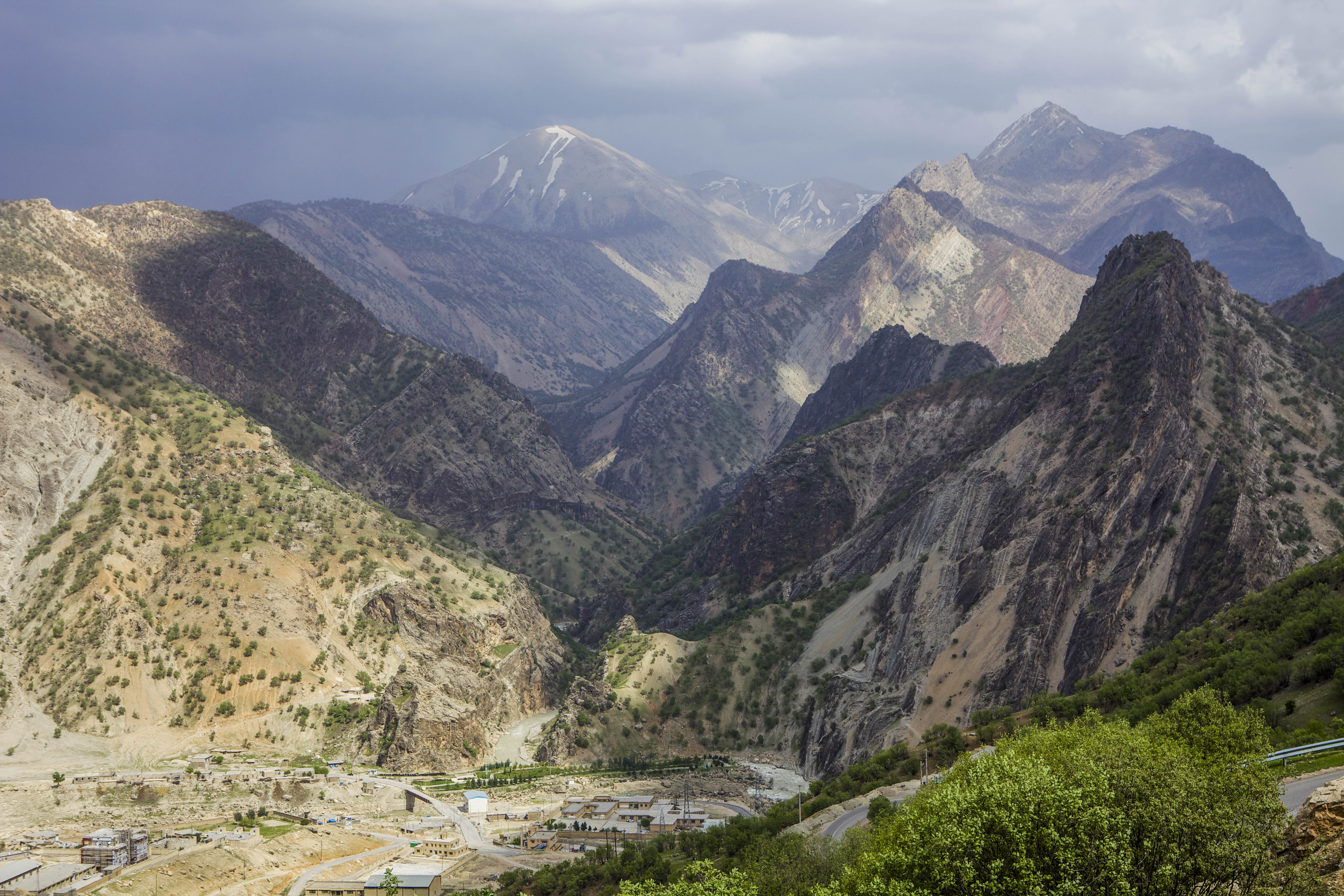
Sepiddasht

In the wider sense it consists of that part of western Iran coinciding with the Ilam province and extending for about 650 km on a northwest to southeast axis from Kermanshah to Fars, with a breadth of 150–180 km. The terrain consists chiefly of mountains, with numerous ranges, part of the Zagros chain, running northwest to southeast. The central range has many summits that almost reach the line of perpetual snow, rising to 4000 m and more. It feeds the headwaters of Iran's most important rivers, such as the Zayanderud, Jarahi, Karun, Diz, Abi, Karkheh. Between the higher ranges lie many fertile plains and low hilly, well-watered districts.

The highest point of the province is the Oshtorankuh peak at 4,050 m. The low-lying areas being in the southernmost sector of the province are approximately 500 m above sea level. Oak forest covers the outer slopes, together with elm, maple, walnut, and almond trees.

Western Luristan comprises a series of parallel fertile valleys running high in the Zagros mountains. The Pusht-i Kuh region is in the western foothills of the Kabir Kuh range. The Pish-i Kuh region lies to the east of Kabir Kuh. This area had human settlements during the Bronze Age as early as the mid–3rd millennium B.C.

=== Climate ===
Climatically, the province can be divided into three parts. The mountainous regions, such as Borujerd, Dorud, Azna, Nurabad, and Aleshtar, experience cold winters and moderate summers. In the central region, the spring season begins in mid-February and lasts until mid-May. The city of Khorramabad is in this realm. However, southern areas such as Pol-e-Dokhtar and Papi, are under the influence of the warm air currents of Khuzestan, and have hot summers and relatively moderate winters.

== Notable people ==
- Hossein Borujerdi, Iranian Sayyid
- Mehdi Karroubi, politician
- Nasrollah Kasraian, photographer
- Qadam Kheyr, local heroine
- Shahmirza Moradi, musician
- Narges Rashidi, actress
- Parviz Shahbazi, writer and filmmaker
- Sayyed Jafar Shahidi, writer, historian, and critic
- Seyyed Ahmad Reza Shahrokhi, representative of Supreme-leader
- Loris Tjeknavorian, Armenian-Iranian composer and conductor
- Abdolhossein Zarrinkoob, writer, historian, and critic

== See also ==
- 2006 Borujerd earthquake
- Chehel Minbari
- Luristan bronze
- Luti people
- Media related to Lorestan Province at Wikimedia Commons
