= Khorram rooz =

Khorram Rooz (Persian: خرم روز xoram rūz) is the first day of Dey, the 10th month of the Iranian calendar. Both religious and non-religious traditions are associated with this day, such as the ancient Persians considering it the first day of the winter and rebirth of the sun. (Persian New Year is on the First day of the Spring in Iranian Calendar.)

== Date ==
Khorram Rooz is the first day of Dey, the 10th month of the Iranian calendar and is the day after Yalda Night.

== Etymology ==
In Persian, "Khorram Rooz" translates to "happy day". The Muslim scholar Abū Rayḥān al-Bīrūnī wrote that the month Dey is also called khor. The first day of the month is called khorerooz. The Zoroastrians call it dey dadar jashn.

== Cultural significance ==
The followers of the Mithraic mysteries consider the first day of Dey to be the birthday of the sun, because the days lengthen afterwards. In sasanid era cause of defeat if the calendar they were adding 5 days every four years to the last month of the fall and first days of winter. These 5 days were called Khorram Rooz (Nowrooz-E-Kuchak) but still the New Year was on the first day of spring in Iranian calendar.

== See also ==
- Yaldā Night
