= Takbirut Tashreeq =

Recitation of Takbir during tashriq

Takbir-e-Tashreeq is the recitation of Takbir during the period of tashriq. It is practiced by Muslims from the time of the morning prayer on the 9th day of the month of Dhul Hijjah until after the afternoon prayer on the 13th day of Dhul Hijjah (before entrance of the dusk prayer). The 9th is the day of Arafah, the 10th is the first day of Eid al-Adha, and the period from the 11th to the 13th of Dhul Hijjah are the 2nd to 4th days of Eid referred to as days of tashriq. During the period of Eid fasting is not permitted. Scholars differ whether Takbir at-Tashreeq is compulsory or highly encouraged, there is also disagreement over the wording to be used.

== Origin ==
Ibrahim was ordered by Allah to sacrifice what is most beloved to him, his only son Ismail. So he prepared his own heart to sacrifice Ismail and told him of this. The son readily agreed to submit to Allah's wish. When Ibrahim began moving the knife on Ismail, the angels were sent with a ram from Jannah to replace Ismail. The angels exclaimed: Allahu Akbar Allahu Akbar (Allah is the Greatest, Allah is the Greatest). ‘Ibrahim heard the voice of the angels and said: "La 'ilaha 'ill-allahu wa Allahu Akbar" (There is none worthy of worship besides Allah and Allah is the Greatest).

Ismail heard this conversation and realized that Allah had relieved him from this great trial and so he said: "Allahu akbar wa lillahil hamd" (Allah is the Greatest and to Allah belongs all praise).
