= Chehel Minbari =

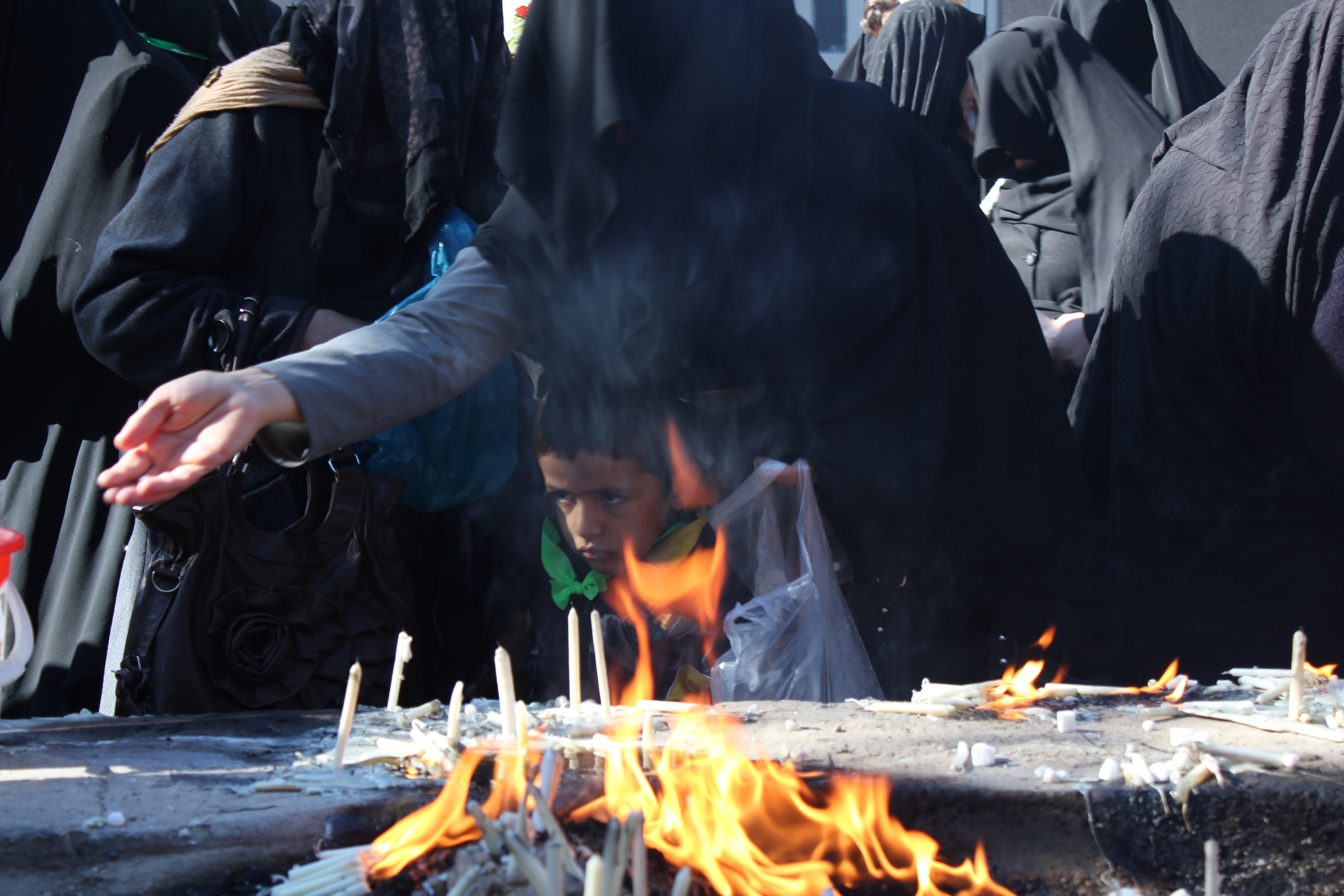
Women light candles during Cheney Minbari.

Chehel Minbari is a tradition practiced in Iran's western Lorestān Province, in which thousands of women commemorate the martyrdom anniversary of Imam Hussein.

Women from cities and towns across Lorestān Province cover their faces completely with black cloth and walk in silence as they knock on the doors of 40 houses and light candles in 40 spots as mourners beat their chests in their grief over the suffering and martyrdom of Imam Hussein along with 72 of his loyal companions in Karbala in southern Iraq, in 680 CE.

Chehel Minbari is held annually on Tasu'a (9 Muharram) as a show of solidarity with the sister of Imam Hussein, Hazrat Zainab. Shia mourners throughout the world gather on Tasu'a to commemorate the martyrdom anniversary of Imam Hussein.

The ritual starts after participants have said their dawn prayers and ends at dusk prayers.

== See also ==
- Mourning of Muharram
- Day of Ashura
