= Iranian Islamic Republic Day =

Iranian holiday

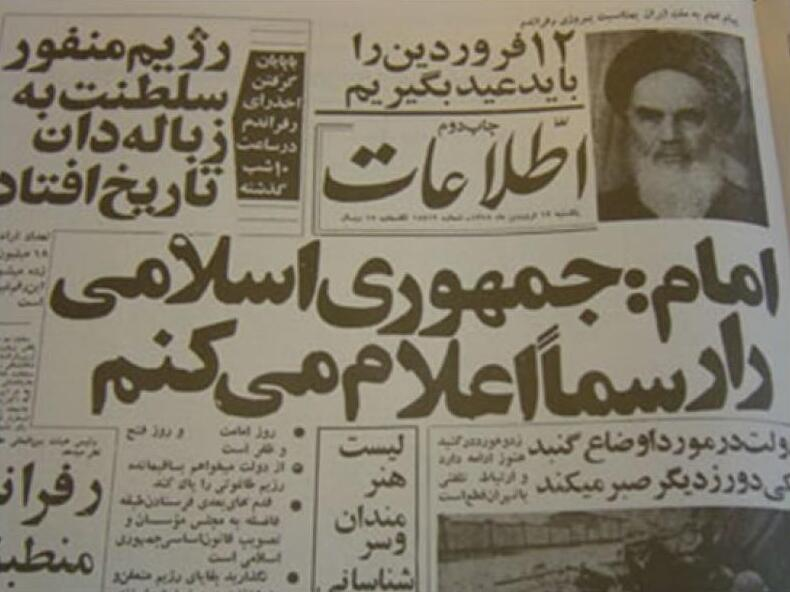
First page of Ettela'at news paper on 1 April 1979. The first big line reads as the name of the day: جمهوری اسلامی

Iranian Islamic Republic Day (Persian: روز جمهوری اسلامی ایران, romanized: ruz Jomhuri Eslām Iran) is the national day and a public holiday in Iran. It marks the day that the results of the 1979 Iranian Islamic Republic referendum were announced. The results announced were a 98.2% vote for the establishment of an Islamic republic in Iran.

== Description ==
On the Iranian Solar Hijri calendar, this day is registered as the anniversary of the 1979 establishment of the Islamic Republic. Two months after victory of the Islamic Revolution in 1979, the new government held the Iranian Islamic Republic referendum on the 10th and 11th of Farvadin (30 and 31 March) proposing to change the Pahlavi dynasty into an Islamic Republic. On 12 Farvadin, the referendum results were announced, with 98.2 percent of the Iranians reportedly voting for an Islamic Republic.

Before the referendum, some political groups suggested various names consonant with the ideology of the revolution, such as a Republic or a Democratic Republic. But Ruhollah Khomeini, the founder of the Islamic Republic of Iran, asked the people to vote for an Islamic Republic, not a word more and not one less word.

12 Farvardin is a book about events of Islamic Republic Day. Other books have also been published about this holiday.

12 Farvardin is also the day of the Martyrdom of Imam Ali al-Hadi.

The day usually falls on 1 April, however, as it is determined by the vernal equinox, the date can change if the equinox does not fall on 21 March. In 2016, it was on 31 March, and in 2017, 2019, 2021, 2022 and 2023 the date was back to 1 April.
