= Shia days of remembrance =

Days recognised by Shi'a Muslims

Following page lists various days of celebration/mourning/remembrance of Shi'a Muslims.

== Twelvers ==
The following is a list of days of celebration/mourning/remembrance as observed by Twelver Shia Muslims:

List of celebration/mourning/remembrance as observed by Twelver Shi'a Muslims
Date	Type	Event	Remark/Notes
Muharram
1	M	Mourning of Muharram starts	continues for 2 months and 8 days until the 8th of Rabi-al-awwal
2	M	Arrival of Husayn ibn Ali in Karbalā, 61 AH	
3	M	Water supply to the camp of Husayn ibn Ali was stopped	
7	M	Stored water in the tents of the camp of Husayn ibn Ali runs out	
9	M	Eve of Ashura	Called "Tāsūʿā" in Arabic
10	M	Day of Ashura	Martyrdom of Husayn ibn Ali & his companions in 61 AH
10	M	Night of ʿĀshūrāʾ	Called "Shaam-e-Ghariba" in Persian and Urdu
12	M	Burial of the martyrs of Karbala by Bani Asad	Aided by Ali ibn Husayn Zayn al-Abidin according to mystic belief
17	R	Abraha attacked the Kaʿbah in the Year of the Elephant	
18	R	Changing of the Qibla	From Al-Aqsa to the Kaʿbah, 2 AH
20	M	10th day after ʿĀshūrāʾ	
25	M	Martyrdom of Ali ibn Husayn Zayn al-Abidin, 95 AH	
30	M	20th day after ʿĀshūrāʾ	
Safar
1	R	Battle of Siffin, 37 AH	
1	M	Prisoners of Karbalā reach Yazid's palace in Syria	
7	R	Birth of Imam Musa al-Kadhim, 128 AH	Due to the mourning of Karbala it is not celebrated
10	M	Martyrdom of Ruqayyah bint Husayn, youngest daughter of Husayn ibn Ali and a prisoner of Karbalā	13 Safar is most authentic
10	M	30th day after ʿĀshūrāʾ	
10	R	Victory to Ali in the Battle of Nahrawan	
12	R	Birth of Salman the Persian	
17	M	Martyrdom of Ali ar-Ridha, 203 AH	According to some scholars 29 Safar or 23rd Dhu al-Qi'dah
20	M	Ar'baeen / Chehlum	40th day after ʿĀshūrāʾ
28	M	Martyrdom of Muhammad, 11 AH	
28	M	Martyrdom of Hasan ibn Ali, 50 AH	
Rabi' al-Awwal
1	R	Hijrah	The migration of Muhammad
4	M	Martyrdom of Fatimah bint Musa	
8	M	Martyrdom of Hasan al-Askari, 260 AH	
9	C	Eid-e-Zahra	
14	C	Death of Yazid	
15	R	First mosque (Quba Mosque) was established, 1 AH	
17	C	Birth of Muhammad, 53 BH	
17	C	Birth of Ja'far al-Sadiq, 83 AH	6th Imam of Twelve Shia Muslims
18	C	Birth of Umm Kulthum bint Ali	
Rabi' al-Thani
8	C	Birth of Hasan al-Askari, 232 AH	11th Imam of Twelver Shia Muslims
Jumada al-Awwal
10	R	Battle of the Camel	
13	M	Martyrdom of Fatimah bint Muhammad, 11 AH	According to some scholars on the 3rd of Jamadi al-Thani
15	C	Birth of Ali ibn Husayn Zayn al-Abidin, 37 AH	Popular opinion is 5th of Shaʿbān
Jumada al-Thani
3	M	Martyrdom of Fatimah bint Muhammad, 11 AH	According to some scholars on the 13th of Jumada al-Awwal
13	M	Death of Umm ul-Banin (mother of Abbas ibn Ali)	
20	C	Birth of Fatimah bint Muhammad, 8 BH	
26	M	Martyrdom of Ali al-Hadi	According to some scholars on 3rd of Rajab
Rajab
1	C	Birth of Muhammad al-Baqir, 57 AH	5th Imam of Twelver Shia Muslims
7	C	Birth of Abbas ibn Ali, 36 AH	Popular opinion is 4th of Shaʿbān
10	C	Birth of Muhammad al-Taqi, 195 AH	9th Imam of Twelver Shia Muslims
13	C	Birth of Ali ibn Abi Talib, 23 BH	1st Imam of Twelver Shia Muslims
15	M	Martyrdom of Ja'far al-Sadiq	
18	R	Death of Abraham	According to one narration
20	C	Birth of Sukaynah bint Husayn	Teenage daughter of Husayn ibn Ali who was present at the Battle of Karbala
22	C	Koo'nda (table cloth dinner)	Cultural Indo-Pak and Iranian day of feasting based on one narration of Ja'far al-Sadiq
24	C	Birth of Ali al-Asghar ibn Husayn	
25	M	Martyrdom of Musa al-Kadhim	
26	M	Martyrdom of Abu Talib	
27	C	Miʻrāj & day of Mabʻath	
28	M	Believed to be the day that Husayn ibn ‘Alī started his journey to Karbalā from Madinah in 60 AH	
Shaʿbān
1	C	Birth of Zaynab bint Ali, 6 A.H.	
3	C	Birth of Husayn ibn Ali, 4 A.H.	3rd Imam of Twelver Shia Muslims
4	C	Birth of Abbas ibn Ali	
5	C	Birth of Ali ibn Husayn Zayn al-Abidin	4th Imam of Twelver Shia Muslims
7	C	Birth of Qasim ibn Hasan	
11	C	Birth of Ali al-Akbar ibn Husayn	
14	R	Laylat al Bara'at	
15	C	Birth of Muhammad al-Mahdi	
17	C	Birth of Ruqayyah bint Husayn	Infant daughter of Husayn ibn Ali who was present at the Battle of Karbala
Ramadhan
4	R	Descending of the Torah (according to one narration)	The Torah (Tawrat) was bestowed on Moses (Musa)
10	M	Death of Khadijah bint Khuwaylid	First wife of Muhammad
12	R	Descending of the Gospel (according to one narration)	The Gospel (Injil) was bestowed on Jesus (Isa)
14	M	Martyrdom of Mukhtar ibn Abi Ubayd Al-Thaqafi	
15	C	Birth of Hasan ibn Ali	2nd Imam of Twelver Shia Muslims
17	R	Battle of Badr	
18	R	Descending of the Psalms (according to one narration)	The Psalms (Zabur) were bestowed on David (Dawood)
19	M	Laylat al-Qadr & "Day of Striking"	Ali ibn Abi Talib was struck on the head by a sword and fatally wounded, 40 AH
20	R	Victorious Conquest of Mecca	
21	M	Laylat al-Qadr & Martyrdom of Ali, 40 AH	Ali ibn Abi Talib dies due to injuries sustained by the sword
23	R	Laylat al-Qadr	
xx	R	Last Friday of Ramadhan	
Shawwal
1	C	Eid ul-Fitr	
2	R	Battle of the Trench	
8	M	Day of Sorrow	destruction of Janat-ul-Baqi by Ibn Saud
9	R	Marriage of Khadijah bint Khuwaylid to Muhammad	
10	R	Major Occultation of Muhammad al-Mahdi begins	
15	R	Martyrdom of Hamzah in the Battle of Uhud, 3 AH	According to Mafatih Al-Jinan & Allama Syed Zeeshan Haider Jawadi
29	R	Birth of Abu Talib	
Dhu al-Qi'dah
1	R	Birth of Fatimah bint Musa	
6	R	Treaty of Hudaybiyyah was executed, 6 AH	
11	C	Birth of Ali ar-Ridha, 148 AH	8th Imam of Twelver Shia Muslims
25	R	"Dahwul Ardh"	"Spreading of the Earth", also believed to be the day that the Ka'bah was established, and that Ibrahim and Isa were born according to some narrations
29	M	Martyrdom of Muhammad al-Taqī, 220 AH	
Dhu al-Hijjah
1	R	Marriage of Fatimah bint Muhammad to Ali, 2 BH	
3	R	Renunciation of Adam accepted	
7	M	Martyrdom of Muhammad al-Baqir, 114 AH	
8	M	Husayn ibn Ali leaves Makkah for Karbala, 60 AH	
9	R	Day of Arafah	It is also a day of supererogatory fasting.
9	M	Martyrdom of Muslim ibn Aqeel & Hani ibn Urwa in Kufa, 60 AH	
10	C	Eid al-Adha	
15	C	Birth of Ali al-Hadi, 212 AH	10th Imam of Twelver Shia Muslims. According to some scholars on 2nd Rajab or 5th Rajab
16	M	Martyrdom of Zaynab bint Ali	
18	C	Eid al-Ghadeer	
19	R	Fatimah went to Ali's house after their marriage	
23	R	Martyrdom of the children of Muslim ibn Aqeel, 60 AH	Buried in Musayyib, Iraq
24	C	Eid al-Mubahila	
27	R	Martyrdom of Maytham al-Tammar, 60 AH	
Type symbols: C = Celebration, M = Mourning, R = Remembrance; Source: Jaffery Welfare Trust: 2009 Islamic calendar & various other calendars and almanacs.
