= Student Day (Iran) =

Anniversary of the murder of three Iranian students, 7 December

16 Azar incident
- Part of Constitutionalization attempts in Iran
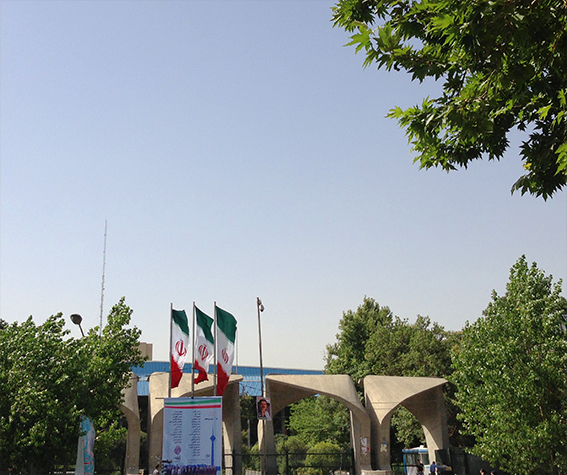
- University of Tehran
- Date: 7 December 1953
- Location: University of Tehran
- Caused by: Opposition to American vice president Richard Nixon's impending visit to Iran
- Methods: Student strike, student riot
- Result: Protests suppressed

Parties
Youth Organization of Tudeh Party; National Front Students' Organization; Islamic Association of Students	(Iran) Imperial State of Iran: Imperial Iranian Army; Shahrbani

Casualties and losses
3	None

Casualties
- Injuries: Several
- Arrested: Several

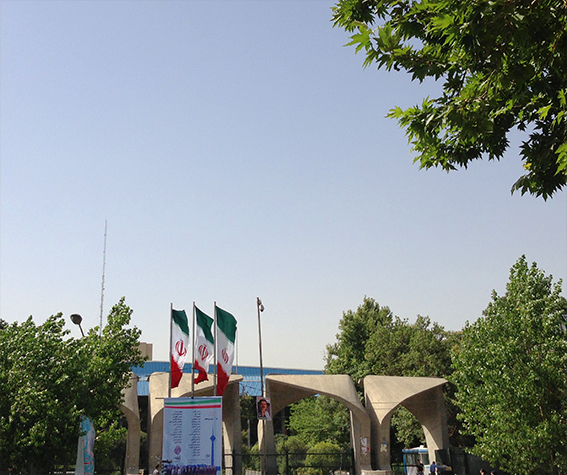
University of Tehran

Student Day (Persian: روز دانشجو) is the anniversary of the murder of three students of University of Tehran on December 7, 1953 (16 Azar 1332 in the Iranian calendar) by Iranian police in the Pahlavi era.

This day is held to commemorate the three students who were killed on December 7, 1953 (16 Azar 1332 in the Iranian calendar), due to protesting the official visit of Richard Nixon, the vice president of the United States at the time, and also the resumption of relations between Iran and Britain. The main reason for students' opposition to Nixon was the Mordad 28th coup and the overthrow of Mossadegh's government . Every year on the 16th of Azar, the memory of that day is kept alive with a ceremony held by various students in all universities around Iran and some other countries.

Every year student demonstrations are held at universities to demand academic rights like freedom of speech and academic independence from the government. Often the protest reflects broader democratic concerns, such as those of 2009 Green Movement in 2009 and the Mahsa Amini (Woman, Life, Freedom) protests in 2022. The government also organises gatherings and demonstrations on campuses which sometimes clash with student-organised protests.

The day is commemorated by various sections of the student movement in Iran, including Leftist, Islamic, and Nationalist groups. It also was commemorated outside of Iran by the Confederation of Iranian Students for years after 1953. The Confederation played a critical role at that time when the student movement inside the country was under severe pressure. A monthly bulletin published by the Confederation was also titled "Azar 16". The 2022 date is December 7.

== The Initial Incident ==
Ahmad Ghandchi who belonged to Jebhe-e Melli (Nationalist Front) and two other students, Shariat-Razavi and Bozorg-Nia who were claimed by Hezb-e Tudeh (a communist Party), were killed when the Shah's police forces opened fire on the students of University of Tehran going on strike in protest at the resumption of Iran's relations with Great Britain and Richard Nixon's visit to Iran, following the coup d'état of 1953.

== During the 2009 Green Movement ==
On the anniversary of Student Day in 2009, large student protests broke out in opposition to the 2009 Iranian Presidential election. Following the December 7, 2009, Student Day protests in Iran, Heshmat Tabarzadi published an opinion piece in the Wall Street Journal, writing, "One thing is certain: Dec. 7 proved that the movement for a free, democratic Iran is robust and only growing in strength. If the government continues to opt for violence, there very well may be another revolution in Iran. One side has to step down. And that side is the government—-not the people."

== See also ==
- Timeline of the 2009 Iranian election protests#December 7
- Iran student protests, July 1999
- Pupil Day (Iran)
