= Ehya night =

Shia Islamic tradition

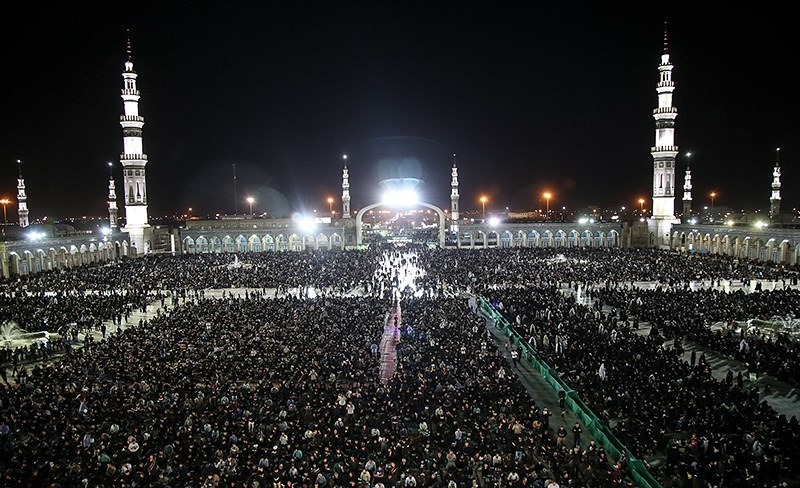
18 June 2017 (23 Ramadan 1438 AH): Ehya night ceremony in Jamkaran Mosque, Qom, Iran.

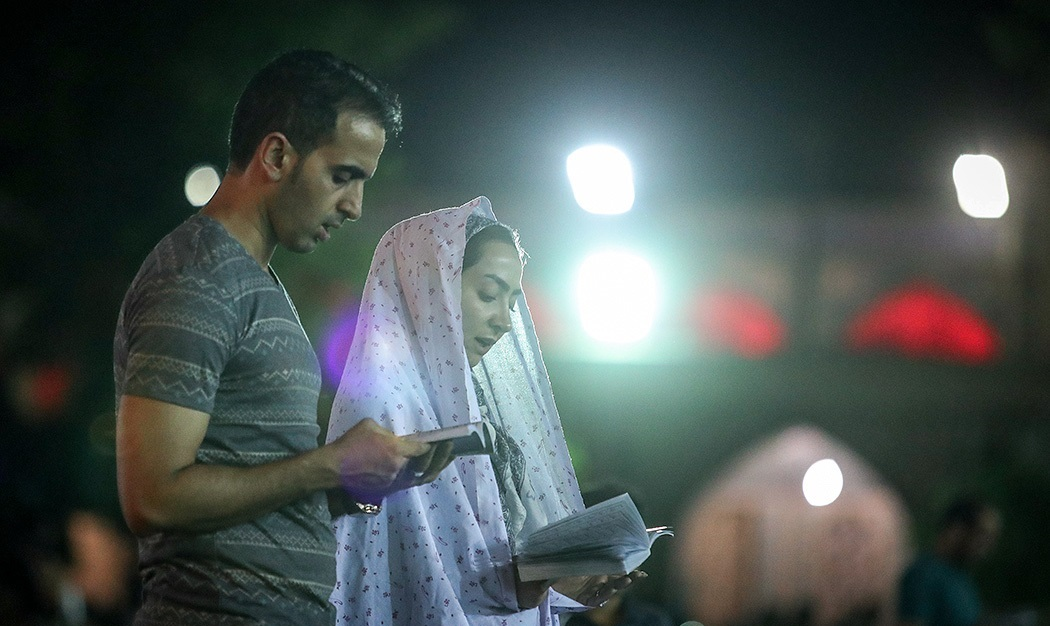
Ehya night in Iran, 2017.

Ehya (Arabic: احیاء, Persian: اِحیا) or Vigil night (spending the night in prayer) is one of the most important traditions among Shia Muslims. According to most commentators, vigil for the purpose of night prayer, as it appears from Surah Al-Muzzammil of the Quran was obligatory for about a year at the beginning of Islam, and Muslims performed it alongside the Islamic prophet Muhammad. According to most Islamic jurists and commentators, after about a year, according to verse 21 of the same surah, God reduced this ruling and replaced it with tahajjud. Muslims observe Ehya or Vigil night on the nineteenth, twenty-first and twenty-third nights of the Islamic month of Ramadan.

== Meaning ==
Ehya in a special term means staying awake and vigil on certain nights of the year, the most important of which is Laylat al-Qadr (the nineteenth, twenty-first and twenty-third nights of Islamic month of Ramadan). Also, in a narration of Ali, it is recommended to vigil four nights, i.e. the first night of the Islamic month of Rajab, the night of Mid-Sha'ban, the night of Eid al-Fitr and the night of Eid al-Adha.

It has been narrated from Muhammad that the heart of whoever keeps the vigil on the Muslim holidays (Eid al-Fitr and Eid al-Adha) will survive on the day when hearts die. A similar narration has been included about vigiling on the night of Mid-Sha'ban.

== Specifications ==
Ehya is a ritual that can be held individually or collectively. One can do Ehya oneself at home or join with a group in mosque. Ehya can be done on all nights of the year, but certain nights are more recommended by religious leaders. Ehya can be accomplished simply by staying awake during the night and reciting dhikr or praying at night. It is also possible to use the more specialized prayers and traditions mentioned in the book Mafatih al-Janan for Ehya.

Ehya Night means spending the entire night in worship and prayer and not sleeping. It is one of the important traditions of Muslims. Shab-e Qadr is a series of nights in the Islamic month, Ramadan, and that is a kind of Ehya Night. As it has been said, the Ehya Night or Qadr Night probably is one of the odd days of Islamic month of Ramadan, which according to Iranian Shittes, the inferred important dates of it, is 19th, 21st or 23rd of the month, Ramadan. The first Ehya Night of the Islamic month Ramadan specially in Iran and some other Muslim countries, is the date 19 Ramadan. In the 19 Ramadan of the year 40 AH, the first Imam of the Shiites, Ali, was attacked while he performing morning prayers and a poisoned sword was stabbed in the crown of his head by Abd al-Rahman ibn Muljam in the Great Mosque of Kufa. Ali died two days later, on the 21st of Ramadan. Therefore, the first Ehya Night for Muslims, especially for Shiite Muslims in Iran, coincides with the 19th of Ramadan and the anniversary of the struck of their first Imam, Ali. They perform the first Ehya Night in 19 Ramadan of every year and mourn because of the injuring of their first Imam, Ali. The second Ehya Night of the month of Ramadan for Shiite Muslims, especially Iranians, namely the 21st of Ramadan, also coincides with the death of their first Imam, Ali, and on this night every year, in addition to performing the Ehya Night traditions, they also hold mourning ceremonies for the death of their first Imam, Ali. The last Ehya Night for Shiite Muslims, especially Iranians, is the night of the 23rd of Ramadan, when they also strive to hold mass worship ceremonies. Of course, in some Islamic books and sources, some nights after the 21st night of Ramadan have also been speculated to be the Shab-e Qadr, but the most important customs of the Ehya nights of the month Ramadan, especially in Iran, are as mentioned above.

=== Rewards ===
It has been mentioned in many narrations of Muhammad and The Fourteen Infallibles that whoever vigiling the nights of Qadr, his/her sins will be forgiven. It is also said His/her livelihood has increased and he/she sees openness in his works. According to the text of the hadith of the Imams, staying awake for part of the night and praying and reciting the Qur'an is very spiritual rewarding in Islam. Other attributes are also mentioned in Islamic texts, including: with Ehya, the disease leaves the body. Makes a person's face bright and beautiful. Makes the house and the place where the Ehya took place illuminated. It causes continuous and long efforts in the day. Guarantee of a hassle-free day. It is an opportunity to relax the nerves and relieve fatigue, depression and irritation of body and soul. An opportunity for pray with the Creator of the universe and the culmination of nearness to God. It builds and strengthens the spirit and transfers power to individual from the source of science and power. It improves the relations between people.

== See also ==
- 19 Ramadan
- 21 Ramadan
- 23 Ramadan
