= Al-Qadr (surah) =

97th chapter of the Qur'an

Surah 97 of the Quran
القدر Al-Qadr The Abundant Portion
- Qira'ah; English text
- Classification: Meccan
- Other names: Fate, The Majesty, Destiny
- Position: Juzʼ 30
- No. of verses: 5

Al-Qadr
Recitation of Al-Qadr in mujawwad.

Al Qadr (Arabic: القدر, "Power, Fate") is the 97th chapter (sūrah) of the Qur'an, with 5 āyāt or verses. It is a Meccan surah which celebrates the night when the first revelation of what would become the Qur'an was sent down. The chapter is titled after the word al-qadr in the first verse.

Surah Al-Qadr emphasizes the exceptional spiritual importance of the night associated with the beginning of Qur’anic revelation. Islamic scholarship describes the chapter as highlighting the dignity of the Qur’an and encouraging believers to seek the blessings of this night through prayer and devotion. The text portrays the night as a time when angels descend with divine decrees and peace continues until dawn, reinforcing its role in Islamic spirituality and religious practice during Ramadan.

== Summary ==
- 1 – The Quran or a divine illumination is revealed to Muhammad on the night of al Qadr
- 2–5 – The night of al Qadr is described and lauded

== Laylat al-Qadr ==
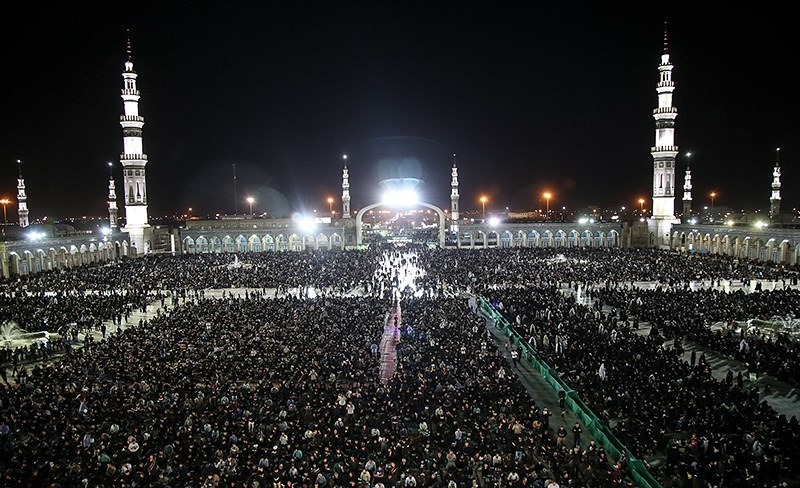
Iranians observing Qadr Night in Jamkaran Mosque

Quran 97 describes Laylat al-Qadr, the "Night of the abundant portion of blessings" in Ramadan on which Muslims believe the Qur'an was first revealed. The night is not comparable to any others in view of Muslims and according to a tradition, the blessings due to the acts of worship during this night cannot be equaled even by worshipping throughout an entire lifetime. The reward of acts of worship done in this one single night is more than the reward of around 83 years (1000 months) of worship. Laylat al-Qadr is referenced in the Quran:

VERILY we sent down the Qur'an in the night of al Qadr.
And what shall make thee understand how excellent the night of al Qadr is?
The night of al Qadr is better than a thousand months.
Therein do the angels descend, and the spirit of Gabriel also, by the permission of their LORD, with his decrees concerning every matter.
It is peace until the rising of the morn.

The "Spirit" mentioned in verse 4 is commonly interpreted as referring to the angel Jibreel (Gabriel). The "peace" referred to is called by Mujahid "security in which Shaytan (Iblis) cannot do any evil or any harm", while Ibn Kathir quotes Ash-Sha'bi as saying that it refers to the angels greeting the people in the mosques throughout the night.

Laylat al-Qadr occurs during an odd-numbered night within the last ten days of Ramadan, but its exact date is uncertain; due to the promises made in the chapter and in various hadith. Muslims consider it a particularly good time for prayer, supplication, and repentance to God. This event marks the descent of the first revelation of the Quran to Earth. The official Islamic teaching is that Muhammad received the revelations that formed the Quran piecemeal for the next twenty-three years of his life up until the time of his death. Shia Muslims believe that Ali (the first Shia Imam, and the fourth caliph of the Rashidun Caliphate to Sunnis) had special insight and intimacy with God on this night.

== Text ==
ِبِسْمِ ٱللهِ ٱلرَّحْمَٰنِ ٱلرَّحِيْم
1. إِنَّآ أَنزَلْنَٰهُ فِى لَيْلَةِ ٱلْقَدْرِ
2. وَمَآ أَدْرَٰكَ مَا لَيْلَةُ ٱلْقَدْرِ
3. لَيْلَةُ ٱلْقَدْرِ خَيْرٌ مِّنْ أَلْفِ شَهْرٍ
4. تَنَزَّلُ ٱلْمَلَٰٓئِكَةُ وَٱلرُّوحُ فِيهَا بِإِذْنِ رَبِّهِم مِّنْ كُلِّ أَمْرٍ
5. سَلَٰمٌ هِىَ حَتَّى مَطْلَعِ ٱلْفَجْرِ

== Arabic Transliteration ==
Bismillāhi r-Raḥmāni r-Raḥīm

1. Innā anzalnāhu fī laylati l-qadr
2. Wa mā adrāka mā laylatu l-qadr
3. Laylatu l-qadri khayrun min alfi shahr
4. Tanazzalu l-malā’ikatu wa r-rūḥu fīhā bi’idhni rabbihim min kulli amr
5. Salāmun hiya ḥattā maṭla‘i l-fajr

== Translation ==
In the name of God, the Most Gracious, the Most Merciful.

1. Indeed, We sent it (the Qur’an) down on the Night of Decree.
2. And what will make you know what the Night of Decree is?
3. The Night of Decree is better than a thousand months.
4. The angels and the Spirit descend therein by permission of their Lord for every matter.
5. Peace it is until the emergence of dawn.
