= 13 Rajab =

13th day of Islamic month of Rajab

13 Rajab is the thirteenth day of the seven month (Rajab) of the Islamic calendar.

In the conventional Lunar Hijri calendar, this day is the 190th day of the 1360year.

== Births ==
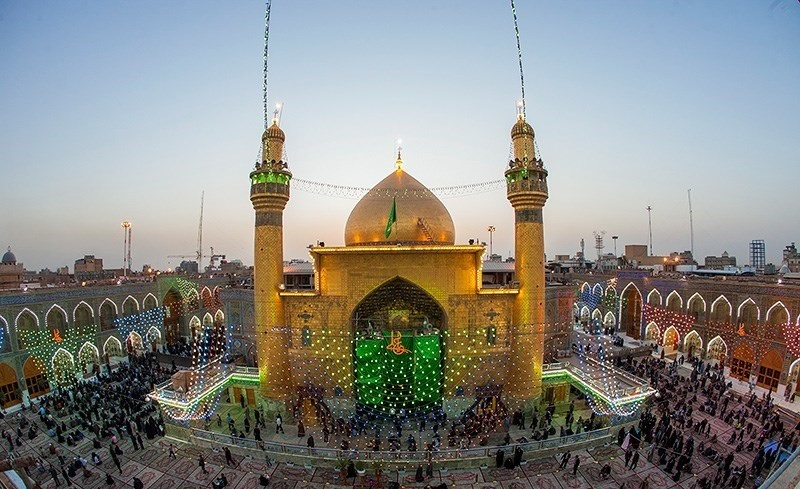
13th of Rajab, birthday of the first Imam of Shiites and sunni (sufis & their followers), Ali ibn Abi Talib, a day of celebration. Imam Ali Shrine, 1 May 2015 (13 Rajab 1436 AH).

- 23 before Hijrah — Ali ibn Abi Talib, the first Imam of the Shiites & sunni (sufis & their followers),, the fourth caliph of Islam, born in the year of 23 before Hijrah of Muhammad the founder of the world religion of Islam, 30th year after the Year of the Elephant (13 September 601)
- 1344 AH — Abdul-Karim Mousavi Ardebili, an Iranian reformist politician and Twelver Shi'a marja (28 January 1926)
- 1348 AH — Seyyed Mohammad Ali Rowzati, Shiite bibliographer and translator (15 December 1929)

== Deaths ==
- 279 AH – Mohammad ibn Isa Tirmidhi, a Persian Islamic scholar and collector of hadith (9 October 892)
- 1327 AH – Sheikh Fazlollah Noori, a prominent Shia Muslim scholar and theorist (31 July 1909)
- 1435 AH – Mohammad Baqer Shirazi, an Iranian Twelver Shi'a Marja (13 May 2014)

== Holidays and observances ==
- The beginning of the white days of the month of Rajab
- The beginning of the Iʿtikāf three days Islamic ceremony in Iran
- Father's Day, on the occasion of the birth of Ali ibn Abi Talib, in Iran, Pakistan, Mauritania, Somalia and Sudan

== See also ==
- 19 Ramadan
- 21 Ramadan
- 23 Ramadan
