= Night of Power =

Night in the Islamic calendar

Night of Power Laylat al-Qadr, ليلة القدر (Arabic)
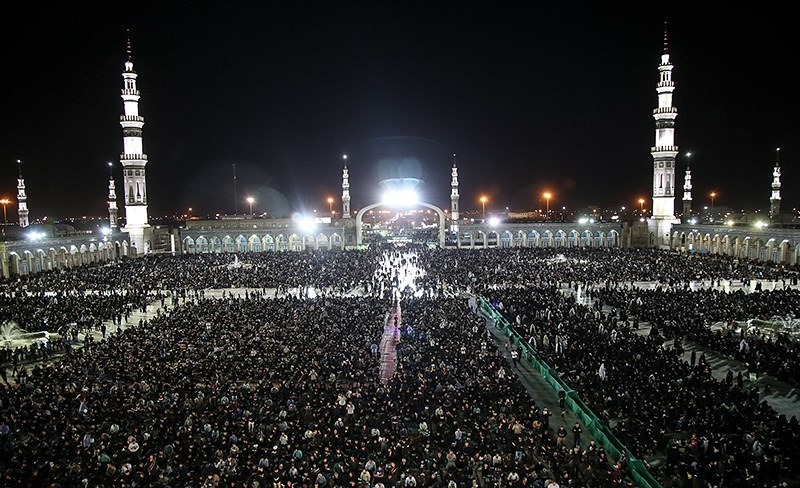
- Reading the Quran is a key observance of Laylat al-Qadr
- Official name: Arabic: ليلة القدر
- Also called: Night of the unprecedented, Precious Night, Night Of Decree or Night of Determination
- Observed by: Muslims
- Significance: The night is believed to be better than 1000 months. Angels descend to the earth and the annual decree is revealed to them
- Observances: Tahajjud night prayers, reading the Quran, making dua, doing dhikr, observing iʿtikāf, giving sadaqah, seeking forgiveness
- Date: Last 10 days of Ramadan, especially the odd nights (some add the 19th)
- Frequency: Annual

Laylat al-Qadr, spelled also "Laylatul Qadr" (Note: lit. 'A night that has a special significance and dignity.' It is also known as the Shab-e Qadr (Persian: شب قدر), the Night of Destiny, the Night of Decree, the Night of Determination, or the Precious Night.) (Arabic: لیلة القدر), is an Islamic festival in memory of the night when Muslims believe the Quran was first sent down from heaven to the world, the first revelation the Islamic prophet Muhammad received from the angel Gabriel. It belongs to one of the five Kandil Nights. Other names include "Laylat al-'Azama" (Arabic: ليلة العظمة, “Night of the Greatness”) and "Laylat ash-Sharaf" (Arabic: ليلة الشرف; lit. 'Night of the Honour').

In the Quran, it is said that the Night is better than 1,000 months (approximately 83.3 years). According to various hadiths, the exact date of the night is uncertain, though it is believed to fall on one of the odd-numbered nights during the last ten days of Ramadan, the ninth month of the Islamic calendar. Since that time, Muslims have regarded the last ten nights of Ramadan as being especially blessed. They believe the night comes again every year, with blessings and mercy of God in abundance. The surah al-Qadr is named after this night, and the chapter’s purpose is to describe the greatness of the occasion.

== Etymology ==
Qadr (قدر) in Arabic, means the measure and limit or value of something or destiny. Some reasons have been offered for its naming:

- It is said that it was called “al-Qadr” because the annual destiny of every person is determined by God.
- Some say if one stays awake on this night in prayer, reading the Quran, or repenting, one will reach a higher state.
- Some have said that it was called “al-Qadr” because it is a grand and highly valued night.
- The word can also mean "power" with a different pronunciation.). (See:Rasm)

== Revelation to Prophet Muhammad ==
Some Islamic experts believe that the Quran was revealed to Muhammad twice:

- The “immediate revelation”, at the Cave of Hira on the first Laylat al-Qadr in 610 CE;
- The “gradual revelation” of Meccan and Medinan surat over the succeeding 23 years.

The Quran uses the word anzal (انزل) which justifies “immediate revelation”, according to Allamah Tabatabai. Some others believe that the revelation of Quran occurred in two different phases, with the first being its entire revelation on Laylat al-Qadr to the angel Gabriel (Jibril in Arabic) in the lowest heaven, and then the subsequent verse-by-verse revelation to Muhammad from Gabriel. The first surah revealed were the first five āyat (verses) of Sūrat al-ʿAlaq ( العلق).

Muhammad would usually practice spiritual retreat (Iʿtikāf) during the last ten days of Ramadan, awaiting the Night of Power, fasting and praying throughout the night, and abstaining from sexual relations. He urged his followers to do the same as one hadith notes: "Whoever stands [in prayer] during the Night of Power out of belief and seeking reward, his previous sins are forgiven." (Sahih al-Bukhari 1901)

== Date ==
The specific date of Laylat al-Qadr is not detailed in the Quran. Muhammad said God told him the exact date in a dream, but as he went to tell his companions about it, he saw two people fighting and God made him forget the date.

According to the Islamic calendar, an Islamic day begins at Maghrib prayer (sunset). The Night of Power thus spans Maghrib to Fajr prayer the following dawn.

=== Sunni Islam ===
Sunni Muslims believe Laylat al-Qadr is most likely one of the odd-numbered nights in the last ten nights of Ramadan (i.e. the 21st, 23rd, 25th, 27th, or 29th). Some scholars opine the odd-numbered night falling on a Friday is the year’s Laylat al-Qadr.

The 27th night is especially significant and widely observed, with many scholars considering it the most likely date. This view is supported by the report of Ubayy ibn Ka'b, a Companion of the Prophet, who is said to have stated in various hadith collections including Sahih Muslim, that Laylat al-Qadr is the 27th night.

Last five odd nights	Gregorian date
1441	15, 17, 19, 21 or 23 May 2020
1442	4, 6, 8, 10 or 12 May 2021
1443	22, 24, 26, 28 or 30 April 2022
1444	11, 13, 15, 17 or 19 April 2023
1445	31 March, 2, 4, 6 or 8 April 2024
1446	20, 22, 24, 26 or 28 March 2025
1447	10, 12, 14, 16 or 18 March 2026
1448	28 February, 2, 4, 6 or 8 March 2027

=== Shi’a Islam ===
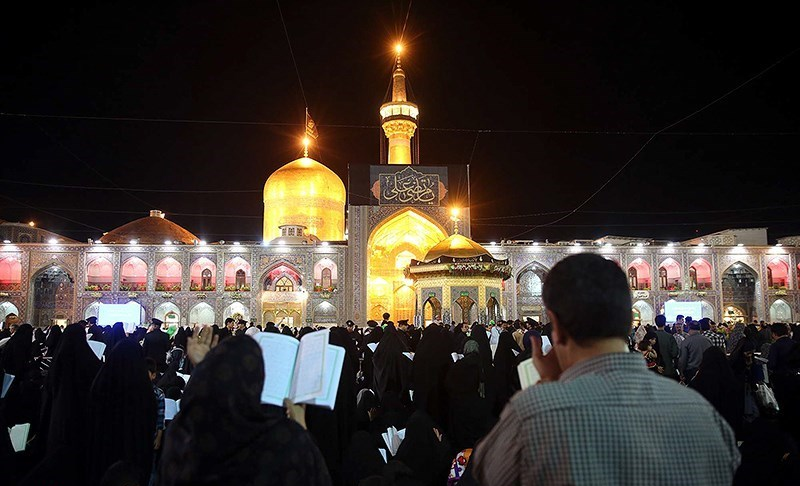
Iranians observing Qadr Night in Imam Reza shrine

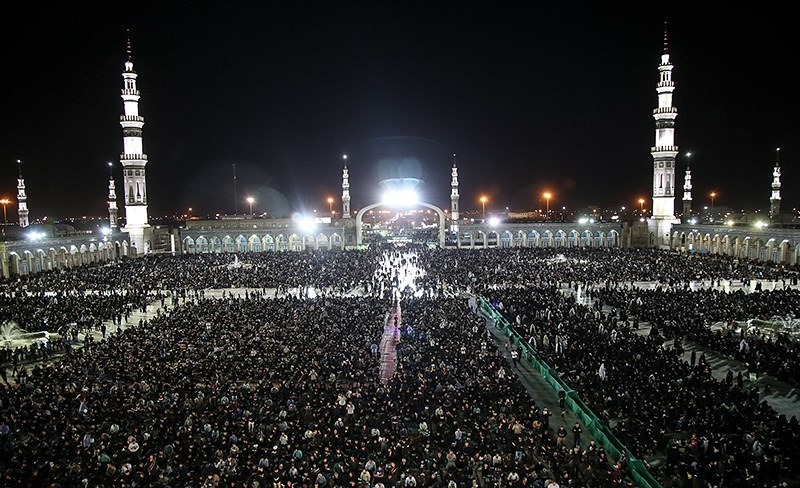
Iranians observing Qadr Night in Jamkaran Mosque

Shi’a Muslims similarly believe Laylat al-Qadr to be one of the last ten odd-numbered nights in Ramadan, with the 19th, 21st, and especially the 23rd being most important. The date of 19 Ramadan is the anniversary of Imam ʿAlī’s assassination while praying in the mihrab of the Great Mosque of Kufa, leading to his death on 21 Ramadan.

Shi’a’s say ʿAlī (who is also the fourth Rashidun Caliph to Sunnis) had special insight and intimacy with God on this night. Imam Sadiq is quoted as saying in Tafsir "al-Burhan" (vol. 4, p. 487):

Once Imam Ali was reciting Surat al-Qadr and his sons, Imam Hasan (a) and Imam Husayn (a) were near him. Imam Husayn (a) asked his father: "Father, how come we feel a different sensation when you recite this surah?" Imam Ali(a) replied, "O son of the Prophet and my son! I know things from this chapter that you are not aware of now. When this surah was sent down to the Prophet he asked me to go to him. When I went to him he recited this surah, then he put his hand on my right shoulder and said: O my brother and my successor! O the leader of my nation after me! O tireless fighter with my enemies! This surah is yours after me, and is for your two sons after you. Gabriel who is my brother among the angels informs me of the events of one year of my nation at the night of Qadr. And after me he will give this information to you. This surah will always have a shining light in your heart and in the heart of your successors until the rising of the dawn of the day of reappearance of Qa'im [the one who rises, a title for the Islamic Messiah, Mahdi]."

Ibn Abbas was meanwhile aware of both the date and day of the week. Hence, Shi’as have generally concluded it falls on the 23 Ramadan.

According to other hadiths, destinies are written on the night of 19 Ramadan, finalized the night of 21 Ramadan, and ultimately confirmed the night of 23 Ramadan.

One other possible dates for Laylat-al-Qadr is 27 Ramadan.

23rd of Ramadan	Gregorian date
1440	28 May 2019
1441	16 May 2020
1442	5 May 2021
1443	24 April 2022
1444	14 April 2023
1445	3 April 2024
1446	24 March 2025
1447	12 March 2026

== Religious importance ==
The Night of Power is believed by Muslims to be of incomparable importance. Blessings received through acts of worship and charity during this night are said to multiply and thus receive special importance. It is stated that the reward of acts of worship done in this one night is more than the reward of a thousand months of worship.

Surah Al-Qadr of the Quran is about Laylat al-Qadr:

1. Indeed, We sent it [i.e., the Qur’ān] down during the Night of Decree.
2. And what can make you know what is the Night of Decree?
3. The Night of Decree is better than a thousand months.
4. The angels and the Spirit [i.e., Gabriel] descend therein by permission of their Lord for every matter.
5. Peace it is until the emergence of dawn.

— Surah Al-Qadr 97:1-5

Devout Muslims can practice a spiritual retreat (Iʿtikāf) during the last ten days of Ramadan by staying at a mosque throughout the ten days, awaiting the Night of Power, fasting and praying throughout the night, and abstaining from sexual relations.

To celebrate the Night of Power, Muslim societies lit candles in mosques, offer public charity, and celebrate fast-breaking in communities. They also gather on this night in the Mosque for taraweeh, often praying 20 rakats. It is said that the rewards for good deeds on this night is equal or more to that done in a thousand months.

== Special prayers (Shi'a) ==
Shi'as practice the special prayers (Amaal) of the Night of Qadr every year in mosques, tekyehs, shrines of Imams or children of Imams, Husayniyyas or their own houses. They stay vigilant the whole night until dawn and worship God. The most important practices of the Night of Qadr include congregational prayers, recitation of the Iftitah Supplication, Abu Hamza al-Thumali Supplication, and al-Jawshan al-Kabir, and collective supplications while they keep volumes of the Quran on top of their heads. Other rituals of the night include donations of dawn food, payment of their nadhr for the dead, feeding the poor, and emancipation of financial prisoners.

Since the assassination of Ali occurred in the last ten days of the Ramadan month, Shi'as mourn in these nights.

== See also ==
- Dehwa d-Šišlam Rabba, The Night of Power takes place during this festival in Mandaeism
- Ehya night
- Glossary of Islam
- Islamic calendar
- Islamic holidays
- Predestination in Islam (Qadar)
