= 23 Ramadan =

23rd day of Islamic month of Ramadan

23 Ramadan is the twenty-third day of the ninth month (Ramadan) of the Islamic calendar.

In the Lunar Hijri calendar, this day is the 259th day of the year.

== Births ==
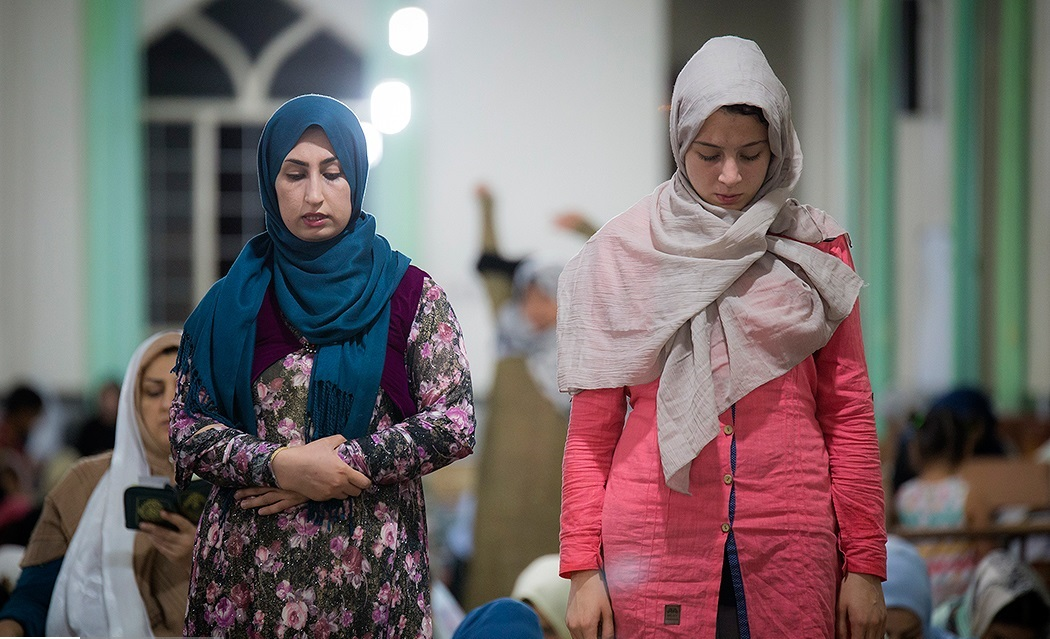
23 Ramadan 1438 AH (18 June 2017), Iran, Sanandaj: official nightlife worship ceremony will be held throughout the country.

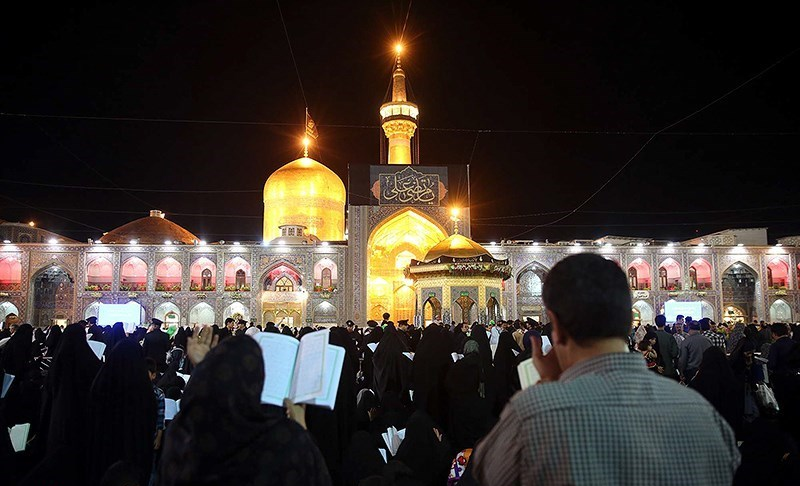
23 Ramadan 1438 AH (18 June 2017), Iran, Mashhad, Imam Reza Shrine: it is customary for Iranian peoples to go to religious places and worship until morning.

- 220 AH – Ahmad ibn Tulun, the founder of the Tulunid dynasty that ruled Egypt and Syria between 868 and 905 AD

== Deaths ==
- 247 AH – Ahmad ibn Isa ibn Zayd, the grandson of Zayd ibn Ali, one of the famous Alawites of the early Abbasid caliphate and one of the famous Zaidiyyah scholars
- 539 AH – Fatemeh Baghdadieh, an Iraqis Hadith scholar woman who lived mostly in Isfahan
- 1384 AH – Javad Fumani Haeri, an Iranian Ayatollah, revolutionary fighter and Shia scholar

== Events ==
- 491 AH – Occupation of Jerusalem by the Crusaders
- 1254 AH – End of writing the valuable jurisprudential book "Jawahir al-Kalam" by Muhammad Hasan al-Najafi
- 1261 AH – End of writing the perfect book on Islamic philosophy "Manẓuma" by Hadi Sabzavari
- 1392 AH – End of writing the notable tafsir (exegesis of the Quran) "Tafsir al-Mizan" by Muhammad Husayn Tabatabai
- The day of the revelation of the Quran, holy book of Islam (more probable, according to the narrations)

== Holidays and observances ==
- The third Qadr Night of Ramadan according to Shiites and most important of them, holding an official nightlife worship ceremony called Ehya night in Iran

== See also ==
- 19 Ramadan
- 21 Ramadan
- 13 Rajab
