= 21 Ramadan =

21st day of Islamic month of Ramadan

21 Ramadan is the twenty-first day of the ninth month (Ramadan) of the Islamic calendar.

In the Lunar Hijri calendar, this day is the 257th day of the year.

== Deaths ==
- 40 AH – Ali ibn Abi Talib, the first Imam of Shiites and the fourth Caliph of Sunnis
- 726 AH - Osman I, the founder of the Ottoman dynasty
- 1104 AH - Al-Hurr al-Amili, a Shia scholar and Faqih, author of Wasa'il al-Shia
- 1028 AH - Seyyed Majed Hosseini Bahrani, a Shia scholar, Faqih and poet
- Moses - Prophet of the Israelites (according to the narrations)
- Joshua - Moses' assistant and his successor (according to the narrations)

== Events ==
- 40 AH - The beginning of the caliphate of Hasan ibn Ali, the older son of Ali and Fatimah, and a grandson of the Islamic prophet Muhammad, the second Shi'i Imam
- 40 AH - The allegiance of the people of Kufa to Hasan ibn Ali for the caliphate
- 40 AH - Retribution of Abd al-Rahman ibn Muljam, the killer of Ali (1st Imam of Shia)
- The day of the revelation of the Quran, holy book of Islam (according to persian narrations)

== Holidays and observances ==
- The second Qadr Night of Ramadan according to Shiites, holding an official nightlife worship ceremony called Ehya night in Iran
- Day of martyrdom of Imam Ali, an official holiday in Iran

== See also ==
- 19 Ramadan
- 23 Ramadan
- 13 Rajab
