= 19 Ramadan =

19th day of Islamic month of Ramadan

19 Ramadan is the nineteenth day of the ninth month (Ramadan) of the Islamic calendar.

In the Lunar Hijri calendar, this day is the 255th day of the year.

== Events ==
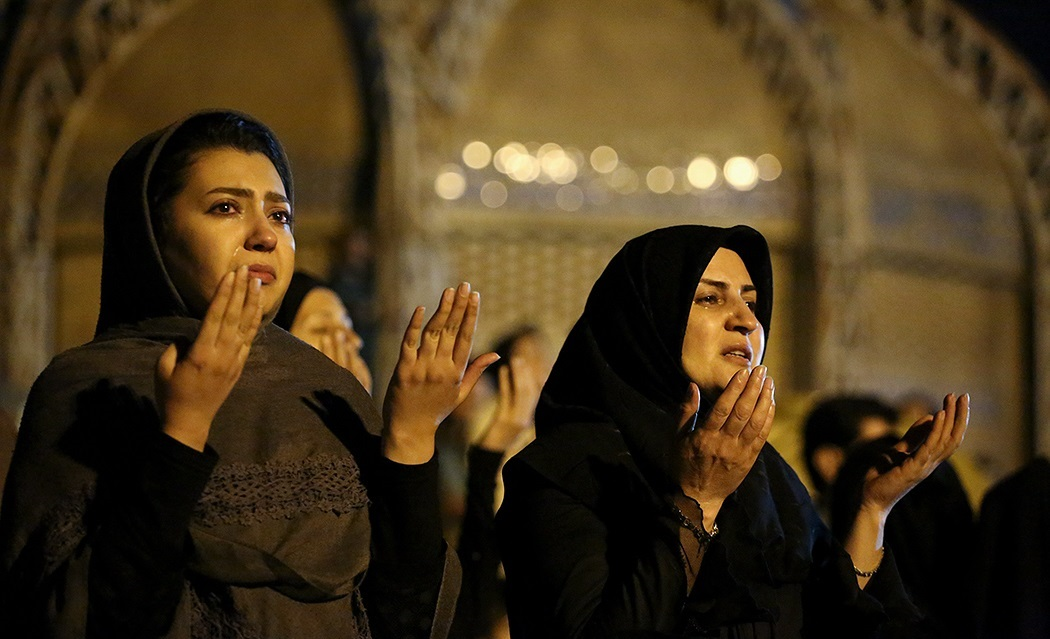
19 Ramadan 1438 AH, Iran, Hamadan: the first Qadr Night ceremony.

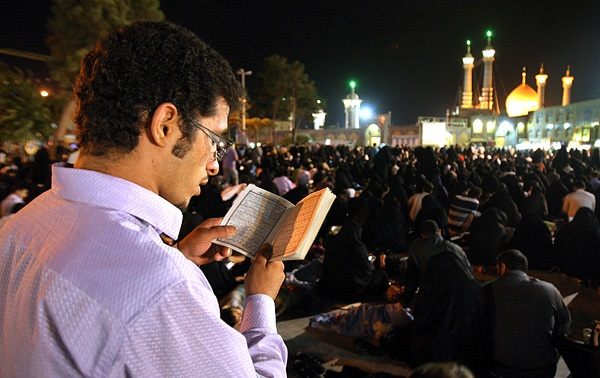
19 Ramadan 1431 AH, Iran, Qom, Fatima Masumeh Shrine: People gather in religious places and worship until morning (Ehya night).

- 40 AH – Ali ibn Abi Talib (1st Shi'i Imam) was wounded with the sword of Abd al-Rahman ibn Muljam in the morning during Fajr prayer, Kufa
- 570 AH – Battle of the Horns of Hama, an Ayyubid victory over the Zengids, which left Saladin in control of Damascus, Baalbek, and Homs
- The revelation of the whole of Quran to the heart of the Islam Prophet Muhammad (according to the narrations)

== Deaths ==
- 556 AH – Tala'i ibn Ruzzik, minister of Fatimid Caliphate, Arab Egyptian poet
- 665 AH - Abu Shama Makdisi, Syrian Sunni Qāriʾ, Faqīh, historian and writer
- 832 AH - Ghiyāth al-Dīn Jamshīd Kāshanī, a Persian astronomer and mathematician
- 1431 AH – Mohammad Hassan Ahmadi Faqih, an Iranian Twelver Shi'a Marja and professor of Qom Seminary

== Holidays and observances ==
- The first Qadr Night of Ramadan according to Shiites, holding an official nightlife worship ceremony called Ehya night in Iran

== See also ==
- 21 Ramadan
- 23 Ramadan
- 13 Rajab
