= Rajab =

Seventh month of the Islamic calendar

- Native name: رَجَب (Arabic)
- Calendar: Islamic calendar
- Month number: 7
- Number of days: 29–30 (depends on actual observation of the moon's crescent)
- Significant days: Isra and Mi'raj

Rajab (Arabic: رَجَب) is the seventh month of the Islamic calendar. The lexical definition of the classical Arabic verb rajaba is "to respect", which could also mean "be awe or be in fear", of which Rajab is a derivative.

This month is regarded as one of the four sacred months (including Muharram, Dhu'l-Qa'da and Dhu'l-Hijja) in Islam in which battles are prohibited. The pre-Islamic Arabs also considered warfare to be blasphemous during these four months.

Muslims believe Rajab is the month in which ‘Alī ibn Abī Tālib, the first Shia Imam and the fourth Rashidun caliph, was born.

Rajab is also the month during which Isra and Mi'raj (Muhammad's journey from Mecca to Jerusalem and then through the seven Heavens) took place.

Rajab and Shaʿbān are a prelude to the holy month of Ramaḍān.

== Name ==
The word "Rajab" came from rajūb (رجوب), the sense of veneration or glorification, and Rajab was also formerly called Mudhar because the tribe of Mudhar did not change it but rather expected its time to be different than the rest of the Arabs, who changed and altered the months according to the state of war.

The name of Rajab literally means respected, regarded, and admired. It seems that the word is originally a Semitic one. There are two important events during the month, namely the birthday of Ali ibn Abi Talib and Muhammad's first revelation in Shia tradition. There are other names for the month, such as Rajab Al-Morrajjab, Rajab Al-Asab, and Rajab Sharif.

== The 27th of Rajab ==
The 27th of Rajab is traditionally associated in parts of the Muslim world with the Israʾ and Miʿraj, the night journey and ascension of the Prophet Muhammad. Classical Islamic sources, including hadith collections and early historical works such as those of al-Ṭabarī, record accounts of the event, though they differ regarding its exact date. Many Muslim communities observe the 27th of Rajab with prayers, sermons, or devotional gatherings, but scholars note that there is no consensus in early Islamic tradition that the event occurred specifically on this day. While both Sunni and Shia scholars affirm the occurrence of the Israʾ and Miʿraj, not all agree on its precise timing, with some considering the 27th of Rajab a later popular attribution rather than a firmly established date.

== Timing ==
The Islamic calendar is a purely lunar calendar, and months begin when the first crescent of a new moon is sighted. Since the lunar year is 11 to 12 days shorter than the solar year, Rajab migrates throughout the seasons. The estimated start and end dates for Rajab, based on the Umm al-Qura of Saudi Arabia, are:

Rajab dates between 2024 and 2028
AH	First day (CE/AD)	Last day (CE/AD)
1445	13 January 2024	10 February 2024
1446	1 January 2025	30 January 2025
1447	21 December 2025	19 January 2026
1448	10 December 2026	8 January 2027
1449	29 November 2027	28 December 2027
1450	18 November 2028	16 December 2028

== Events ==
- The Battle of Tabouk took place in Rajab, 9 AH (October 630).
- The Second pledge at al-Aqabah took place in Rajab.
- 6 Rajab: Many Sufi followers of the Chishti tariqa (path) celebrate the anniversary of Khawaja Moinuddin Chishti.
- 7 Rajab: Twelvers observe the Festival of Imam Musa al-Kazim in dedication of Musā' al-Kādhim. This is so as to avoid missing celebrating the birth of the seventh imam, which took place in Safar.
- 22 Rajab, In India and Pakistan, Koonday (tablecloth dinner) is organized. It is an occasion for Muslims to discuss Allah and the Ahlul Bayt and to strengthen ties among the Sunni Sufi community with love and compassion.
- 27 Rajab, event of Isra and Mi'raj.
- 27 Rajab 583 AH, Conquest of Jerusalem by the Ayyubids

=== Births ===
- 1 Rajab: Muhammad al-Baqir
- 4 Rajab: Khwaja Banda Nawaz
- 5 Rajab: ‘Alī al-Hadī
- 9 Rajab: ‘Alī al-Asghar
- 12 Rajab: Muhammad al-Taqī
- 13 Rajab: ‘Alī ibn Abī Tālib
- 14 Rajab: Mu'in al-Din Chishti
- 20 Rajab: Sakina bint Hussain

=== Deaths ===
- 3 Rajab: ‘Alī al-Naqī, Twelver Imam & Uwais al-Qarni
- 8 Rajab: Nazim Al-Haqqani, a Turkish Cypriot Sufi Muslim sheikh and spiritual leader of the Naqshbandi tariqa.
- 14 Rajab: Akhundzada Saif-ur-Rahman Mubarak, the founder of the Naqshbandi Mujaddidi Saifia Tariqa.
- 15 Rajab: Zainab bint Ali
- 22 Rajab: Mu'awiya, first caliph of the Umayyad Caliphate
- 25 Rajab: Musā' al-Kādhim, seventh Twelver Imam
- 25 Rajab: Al-Nawawi, Shafi'ite jurist and hadith scholar
- 26 Rajab: Abu Talib ibn Abdul Muttalib, uncle of Muhammad and father of Ali
