= Iʿtikāf =

Islamic practice of religious seclusion

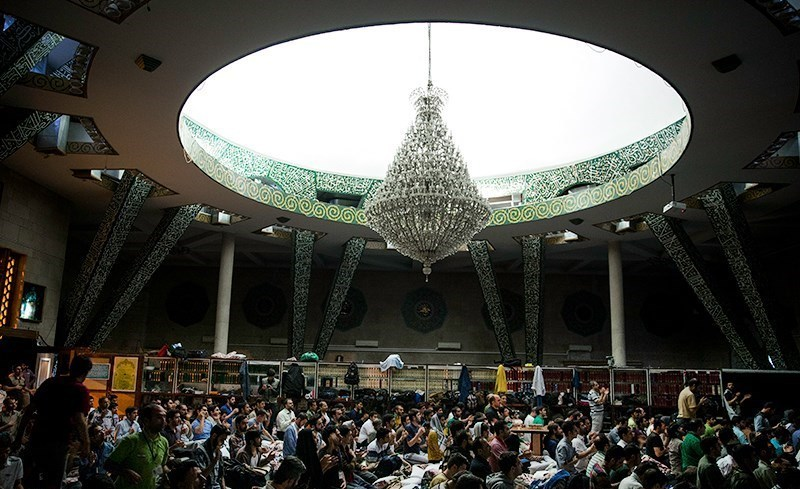
Iʿtikāf at the University of Tehran in Iran, April 2016

Iʿtikāf (Arabic: اعتكاف, also i'tikaaf or e'tikaaf) is an Islamic practice in which a person secludes himself or herself in a mosque for a period of time, devoting the days to worship and staying away from worldly affairs. The word derives from the Arabic root ʿ-k-f (ع-ك-ف), meaning to adhere, cling, or devote oneself to something. The practice is especially associated with the last ten days of Ramadan, during which the Islamic prophet Muhammad is reported to have regularly withdrawn into the mosque seeking Laylat al-Qadr (the Night of Decree).

== Scriptural basis ==
=== Quran ===
The Quran refers to the practice in two verses. In Surah al-Baqarah 2:125, God commands Ibrahim and Isma'il to purify the Kaaba "for those who circle it, those who stay there for devotion (al-ʿākifīn), and those who bow and prostrate." The verse is understood by classical scholars to indicate that iʿtikāf was an approved form of worship in earlier Abrahamic tradition. A second reference appears in Surah al-Baqarah 2:187, where the injunction against sexual relations during Ramadan fasting is extended: "And do not have relations with them as long as you are staying for worship (ʿākifūn) in the mosques." This verse establishes the mosque as the designated site for the practice and sexual intercourse as incompatible with it.

=== Hadith ===
Multiple traditions in Sahih al-Bukhari and Sahih Muslim report that Muhammad observed iʿtikāf during the last ten days of Ramadan each year for the remainder of his life after the practice was instituted. In the year of his death, he observed it for twenty days. Aisha, his wife, reported that he would enter his place of seclusion after the Fajr prayer on the morning of the twenty-first of Ramadan.

A key purpose of the Prophet's iʿtikāf was to seek Laylat al-Qadr. A hadith narrated by Abu Sa'id al-Khudri relates that Muhammad initially observed iʿtikāf during the middle ten days of Ramadan, but after being informed that the Night of Decree lay in the last ten, he extended his seclusion accordingly and instructed his companions: "Search for it in the odd nights of the last ten days."

== Jurisprudence ==
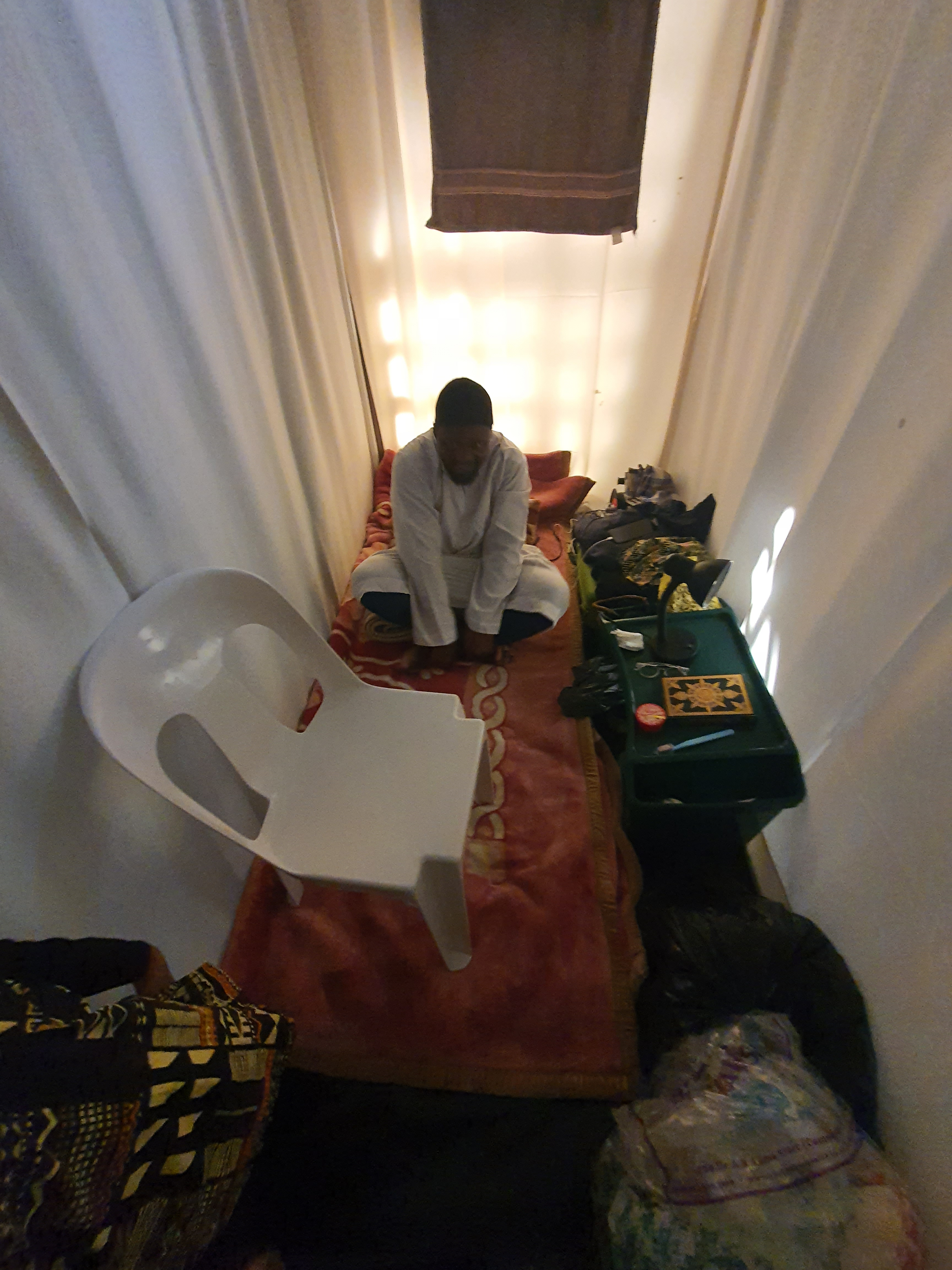
Iʿtikāf at a mosque on West Street in Durban, South Africa, April 2024

There is scholarly consensus (ijma) that iʿtikāf is a legitimate act of worship prescribed in Islamic law. Scholars including al-Nawawi, Ibn Qudamah, and Ibn Taymiyyah have all affirmed this consensus.

=== Types ===
Classical Hanafi jurisprudence divides iʿtikāf into three categories:

- Wājib (obligatory): becomes binding when a person makes a vow (nadhr) to observe it. A vowed iʿtikāf must be accompanied by fasting.
- Sunnah muʾakkadah (confirmed prophetic practice): the iʿtikāf observed during the last ten days of Ramadan. In Hanafi law, this is classified as sunnah muʾakkadah ʿalā al-kifāyah, meaning it is a communal obligation—if at least one person in a locality performs it, the duty is discharged on behalf of the community, but if no one does so, the entire community bears responsibility for the omission.
- Mustaḥabb or nafl (recommended or voluntary): may be performed at any time of the year, for any duration, and does not require fasting.

The Shafi'i, Maliki, and Hanbali schools agree that iʿtikāf is a recommended practice rather than an obligation, becoming obligatory only through a vow. They differ from the Hanafi school in that they do not require fasting as a condition for its validity.

=== Conditions ===
The basic conditions for a valid iʿtikāf as agreed upon by the major schools of jurisprudence include: an intention (niyyah), the state of Islam (being Muslim), sanity, and remaining within a mosque. The person observing iʿtikāf (muʿtakif) must not leave the mosque except for essential needs, such as using the lavatory or performing the ritual bath. The iʿtikāf is invalidated by leaving the mosque without necessity, by sexual intercourse (per Quran 2:187), and in Hanafi law by the breaking of one's fast during the Ramadan iʿtikāf.

All four Sunni schools agree that men must observe iʿtikāf in a mosque; it is preferred to choose a congregational mosque where Friday prayers are held, so that the muʿtakif need not leave for the weekly congregational obligation. Regarding women, the Shafi'i and Hanbali schools permit them to observe iʿtikāf in a mosque, while the Hanafi school holds that women should observe it in their designated prayer area at home.

== Practice ==
During iʿtikāf, the muʿtakif occupies himself with acts of worship: prayer, recitation of the Quran, remembrance of God, and supplication. It is considered desirable to avoid unnecessary speech and worldly conversation. Many mosques worldwide accommodate large numbers of participants during the last ten days of Ramadan, setting aside areas of the mosque for those in seclusion.

== See also ==
- Khalwa (Sufism)
- Laylat al-Qadr
- Ramadan
- Retreat (spiritual)
