= Jamkaran Mosque =

Shi'ite mosque and shrine in Qom, Iran

- مسجد جمکران
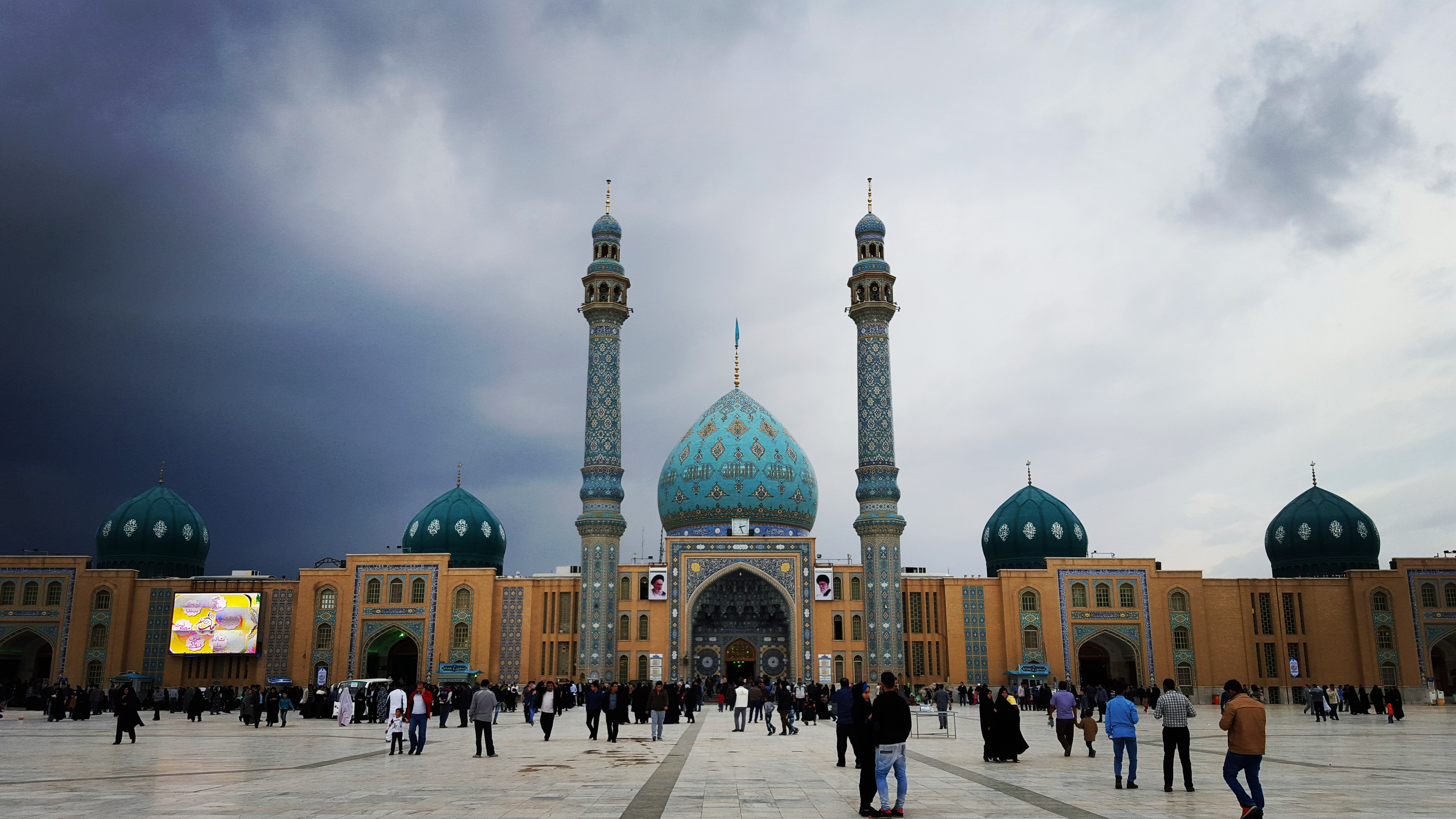
- The mosque in 2016

- Location of the mosque in Iran

Religion
- Affiliation: Shia Islam
- Ecclesiastical or organisational status: Mosque and shrine
- Leadership: Ali Akbar Ojaghnezhad
- Status: Active

Location
- Location: Jamkaran, Qom County, Qom Province
- Country: Iran
- Coordinates: 34°34′59.5″N 50°54′50″E

Architecture
- Type: Mosque architecture
- Style: Buyid; Afsharid; Safavid
- Founder: Sheikh Hassan ibn Muthlih Jamkarani
- Funded by: Hasan bin Muslim
- Completed: 373 AH (983/984 CE); 1745 CE (renovations); 19th century (sahn, renovations); 1990s (annex)

Specifications
- Dome: Five
- Minaret: Two
- Shrine: One
- Materials: Bricks; mortar; concrete; ceramic tiles

Website
- jamkaran.ir (in Persian)

The Jamkaran Mosque (Persian: مسجد جمکران, romanized: Masjed-e Jamkarân), also known as Saheb al-Zaman Mosque, is a mosque located in the village of Jamkaran, on the outskirts of the holy city of Qom, Iran. Twelver belief holds that the twelfth Imam—the promised Mahdi—once appeared and offered prayers at Jamkaran. The shrine is a holy site in Shia Islam.

Many Shia Muslims go to this mosque on Wednesday nights. The mosque has a history of over a thousand years, and receives more than 15 million pilgrims annually. Every year, millions celebrate Mid-Sha'ban at the mosque, marking the birth of Muhammad al-Mahdi.

== History ==
Jamkaran was an important village in the past and its name has been mentioned many times in the history of Qom. It was further developed after the residents of Ghadiriyah from the Bani Asad tribe fled to Qom, during the Mukhtar uprising in Kufa (685 CE). The mosque, six kilometres (three point seven miles) east of Qom, has been a sacred place at least since 17th of Ramadan of 373 AH (983/984 CE), when Sheikh Hassan ibn Muthlih Jamkarani reportedly met the Twelfth Imam along with the prophet Al-Khidr.

Jamkarani was instructed that the land they were on was "noble" and that the owner, Hasan bin Muslim, was to cease cultivating it and finance the building of a mosque on it from the earnings he had accumulated from farming the land. In the late Qajar and early Pahlavi periods, the mosque was half-ruined. The recent prosperity of the Jamkaran Mosque is due to the efforts of Mohammad Taqi Bafiqi. Before him, only some knowledgeable people went to the Jamkaran Mosque to spend the night. Bafiqi would walk to the mosque every Wednesday night with a group of students and offer Maghrib and Isha prayers there, and would pray there until the morning call to prayer, thus drawing people's attention to the mosque.

=== 20th and 21st centuries ===
Sometime in the decade of 1995–2005, the mosque's reputation spread, and many pilgrims, particularly young people, began to come to it. In the rear of the mosque, there is a "well of requests" where it is believed the Twelfth Imam once "became miraculously unhidden for a brief shining moment of loving communion with his creator." Pilgrims tie small strings in a knot around the grids covering the holy well, which they hope will be received by the Imam Mahdi. Every morning custodians cut off the strings from the previous day.

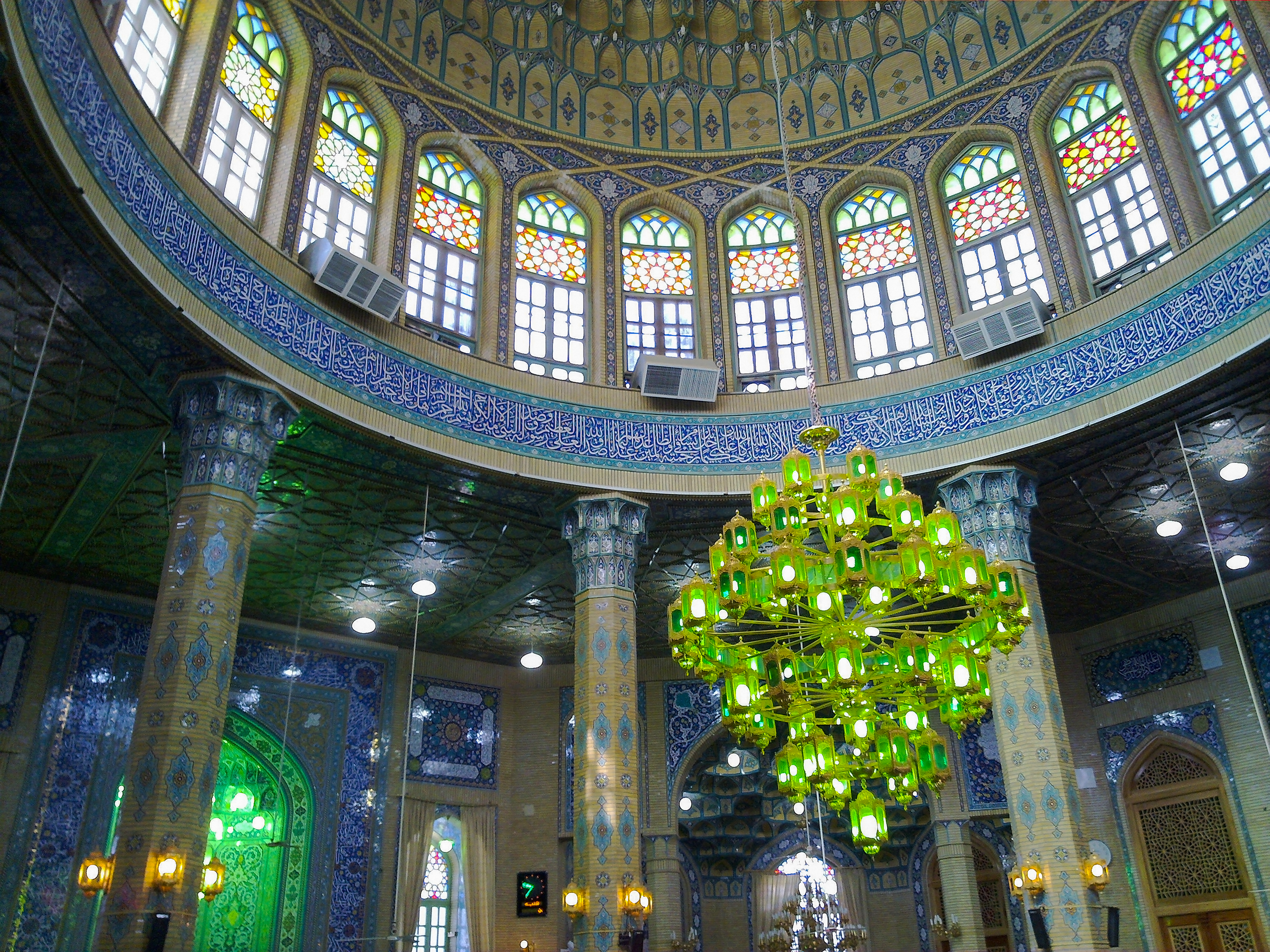
View of the Shabestan inside the mosque

Tuesday night is especially popular as it is said to be "the day the vision appeared and therefore the day of the week that [the Imam], although invisible, takes requests." The gathering "resembles a huge tailgate party where vendors set up in the parking lots and families set up picnic rugs and tens of thousands wander about the grounds as if waiting for the main event to happen." More than a hundred thousand pilgrims sometimes pray outside the overflowing mosque for Maghrib prayer. In keeping with separation of the sexes, women are separated from men in their own special cordoned-off area and also have their own well. Also on Tuesdays, the mosque kitchen provides a free evening meal to thousands of poor people.

== Architecture ==
The architecture of the mosque features Iranian art and craftsmanship, with tile work, five domes, and spacious courtyards, including the Sahib Al-Zaman Courtyard. The main prayer hall, with its iwan, is adorned with verses from the Quran and Islamic motifs.

== Gallery ==
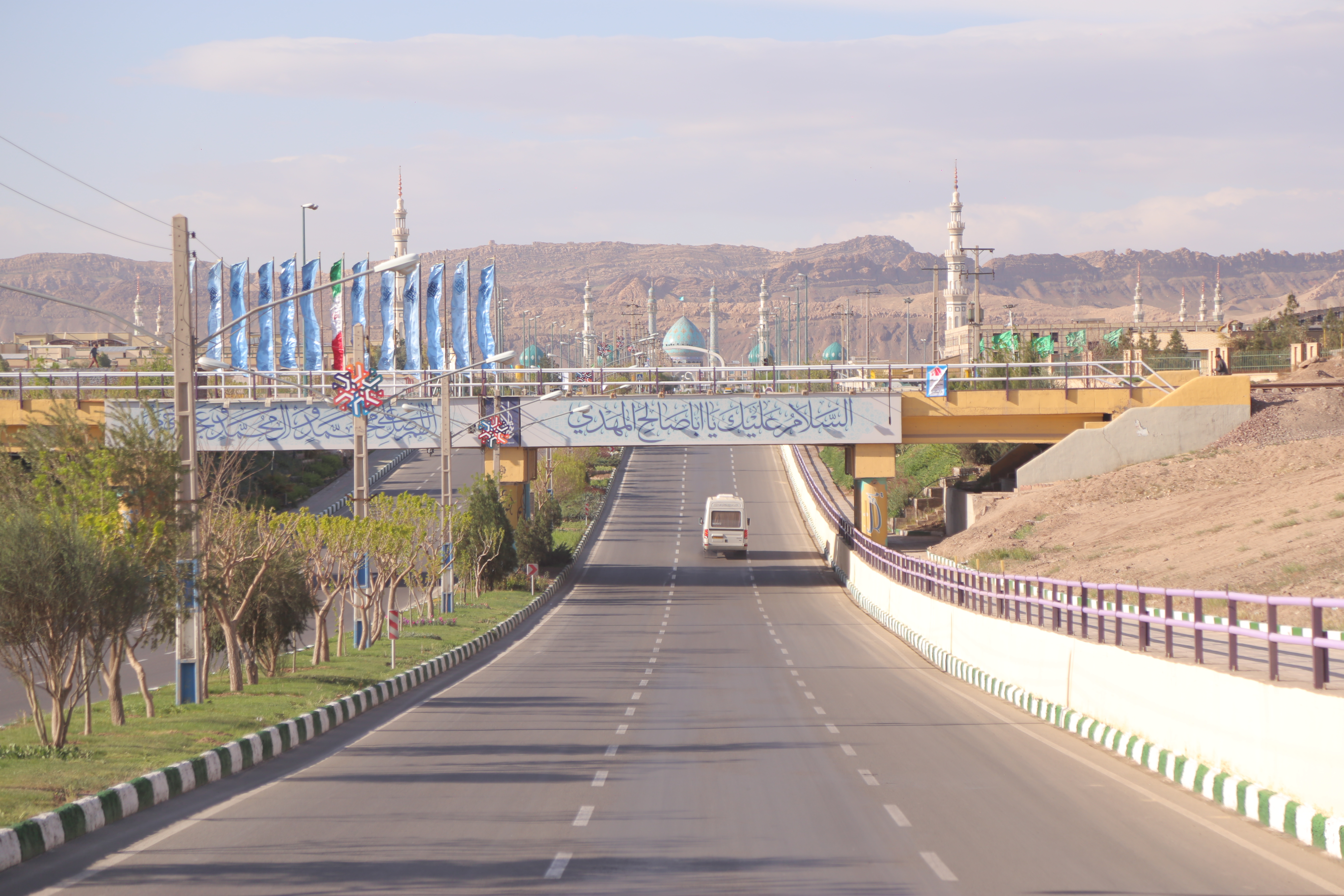

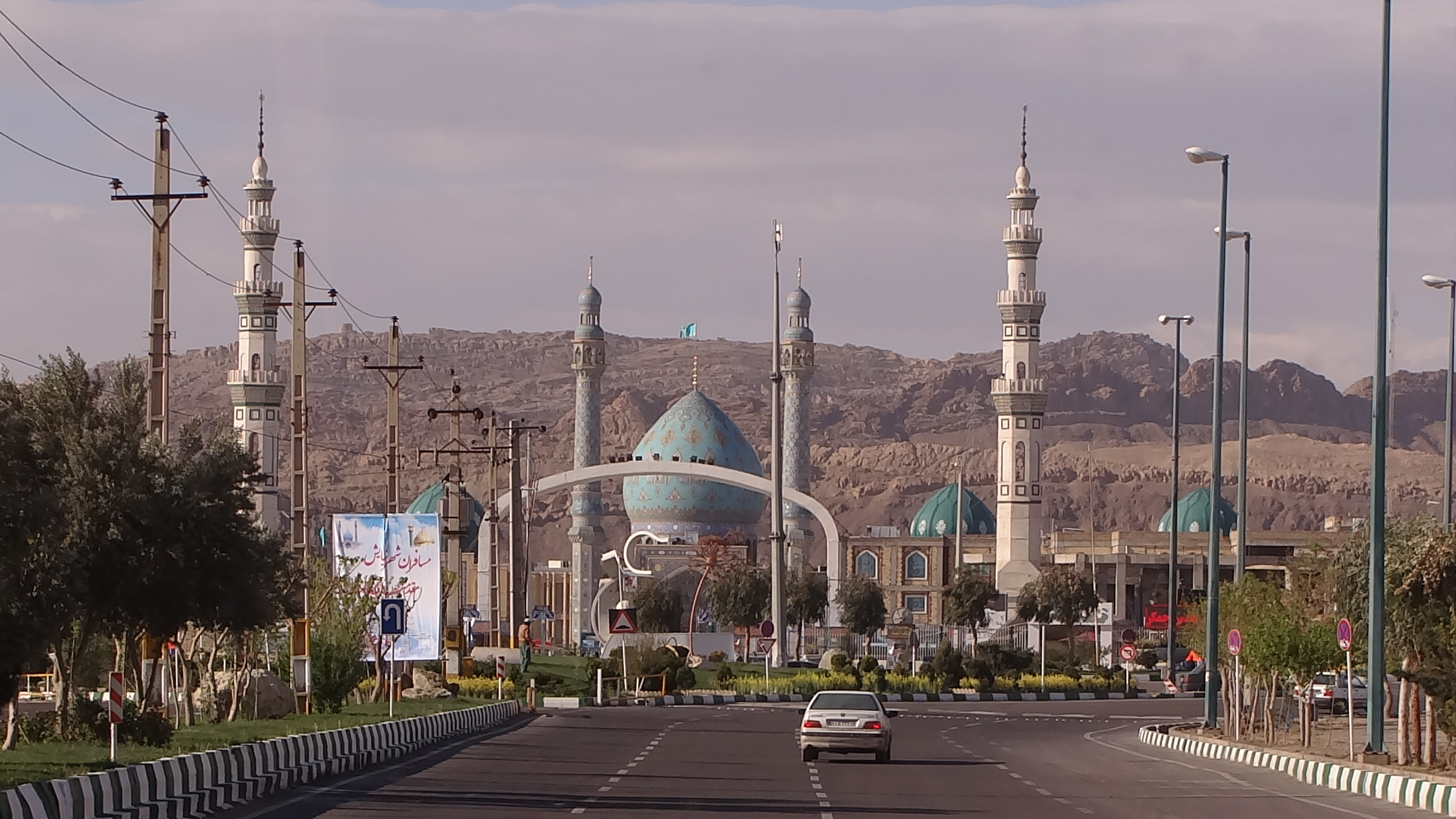

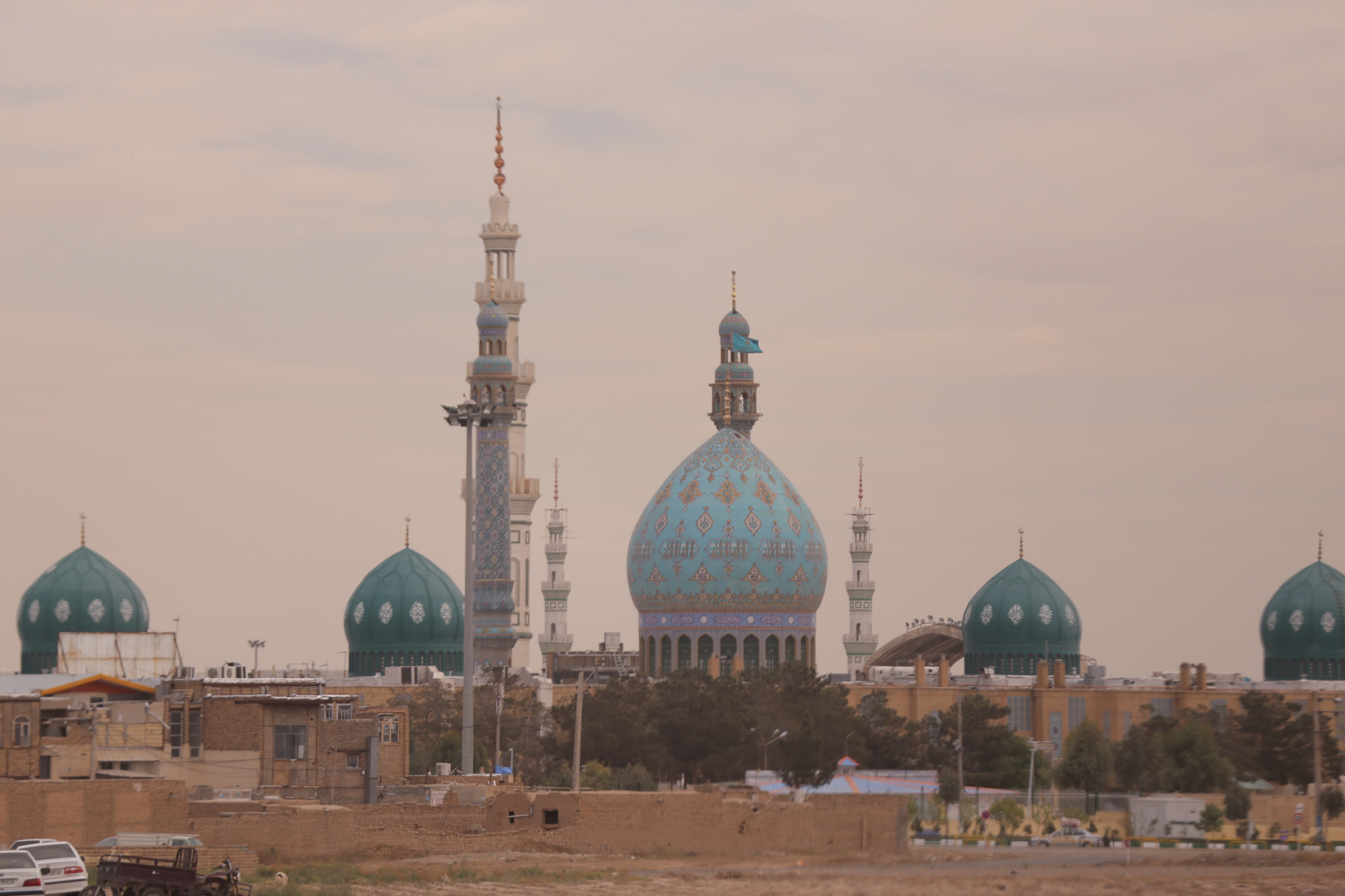

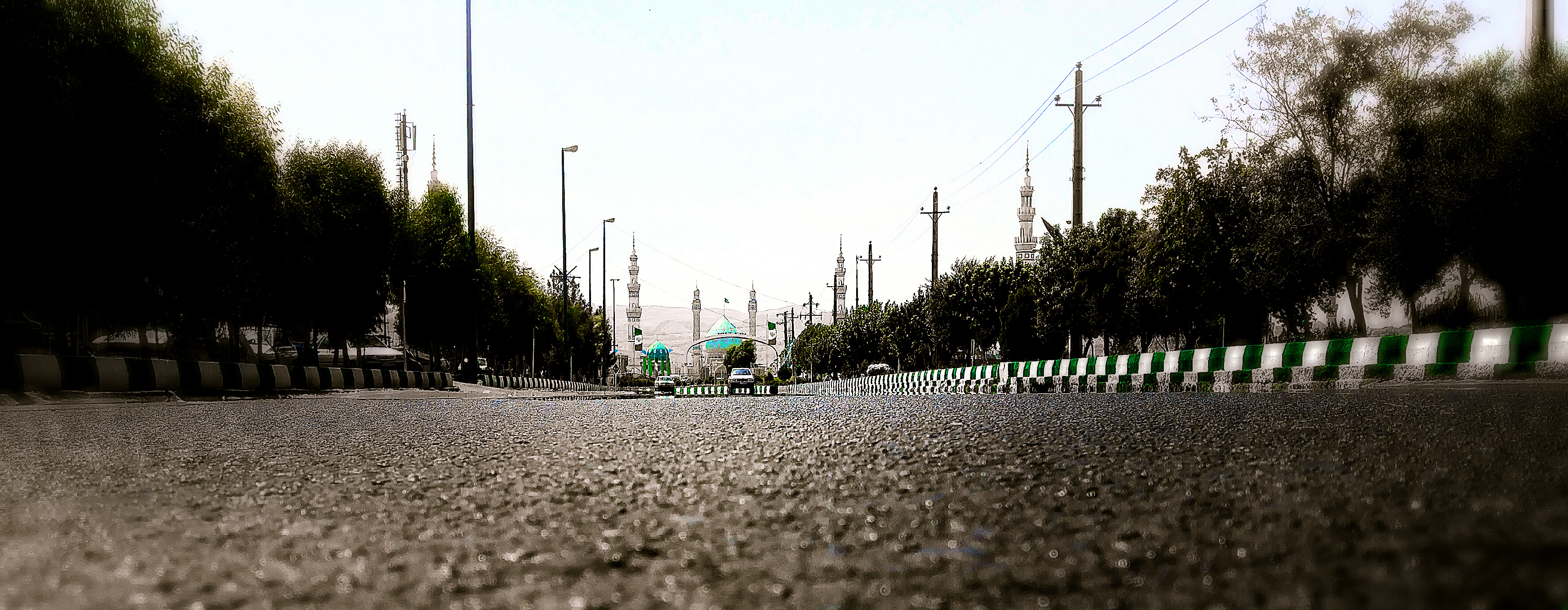

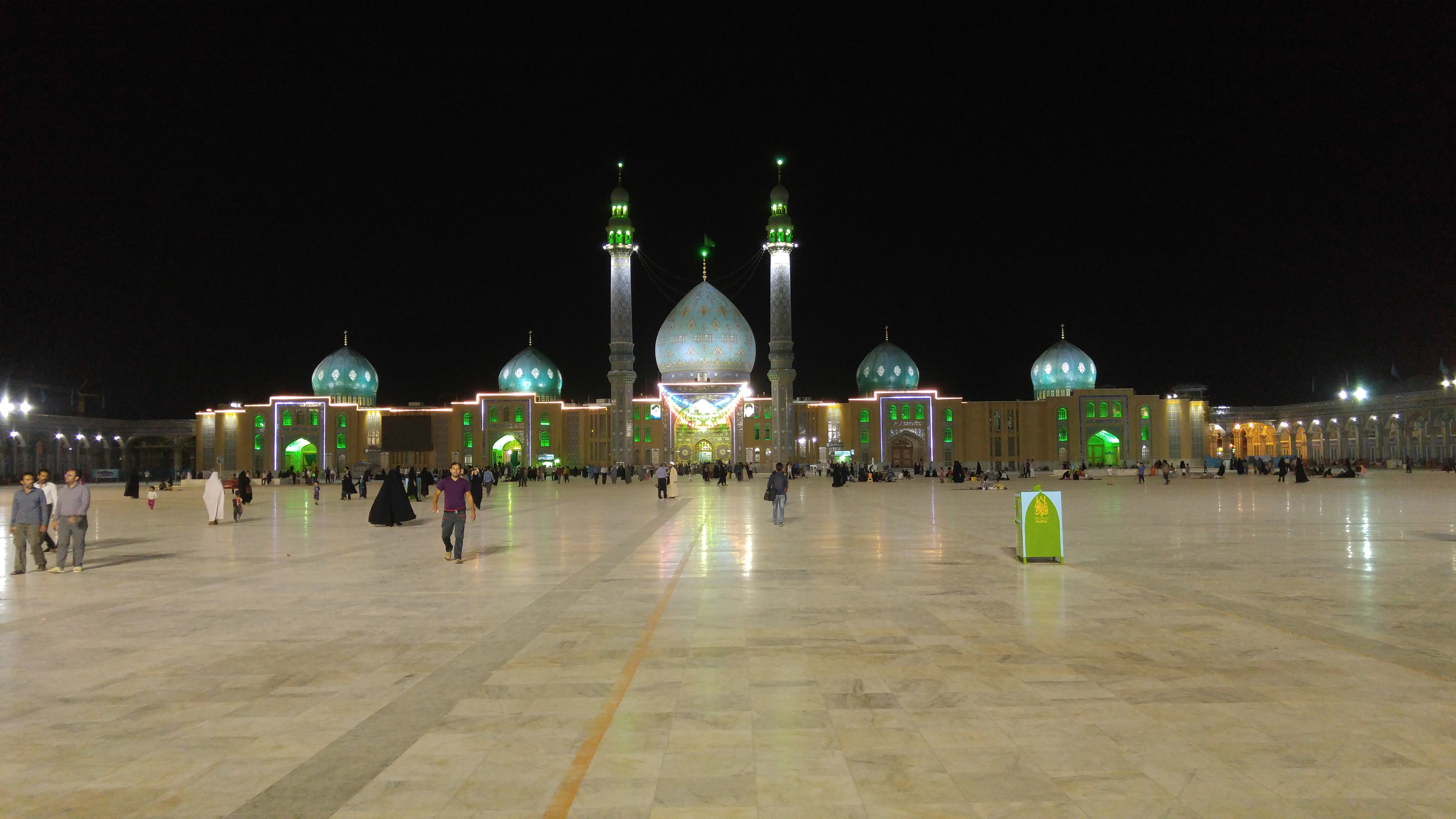

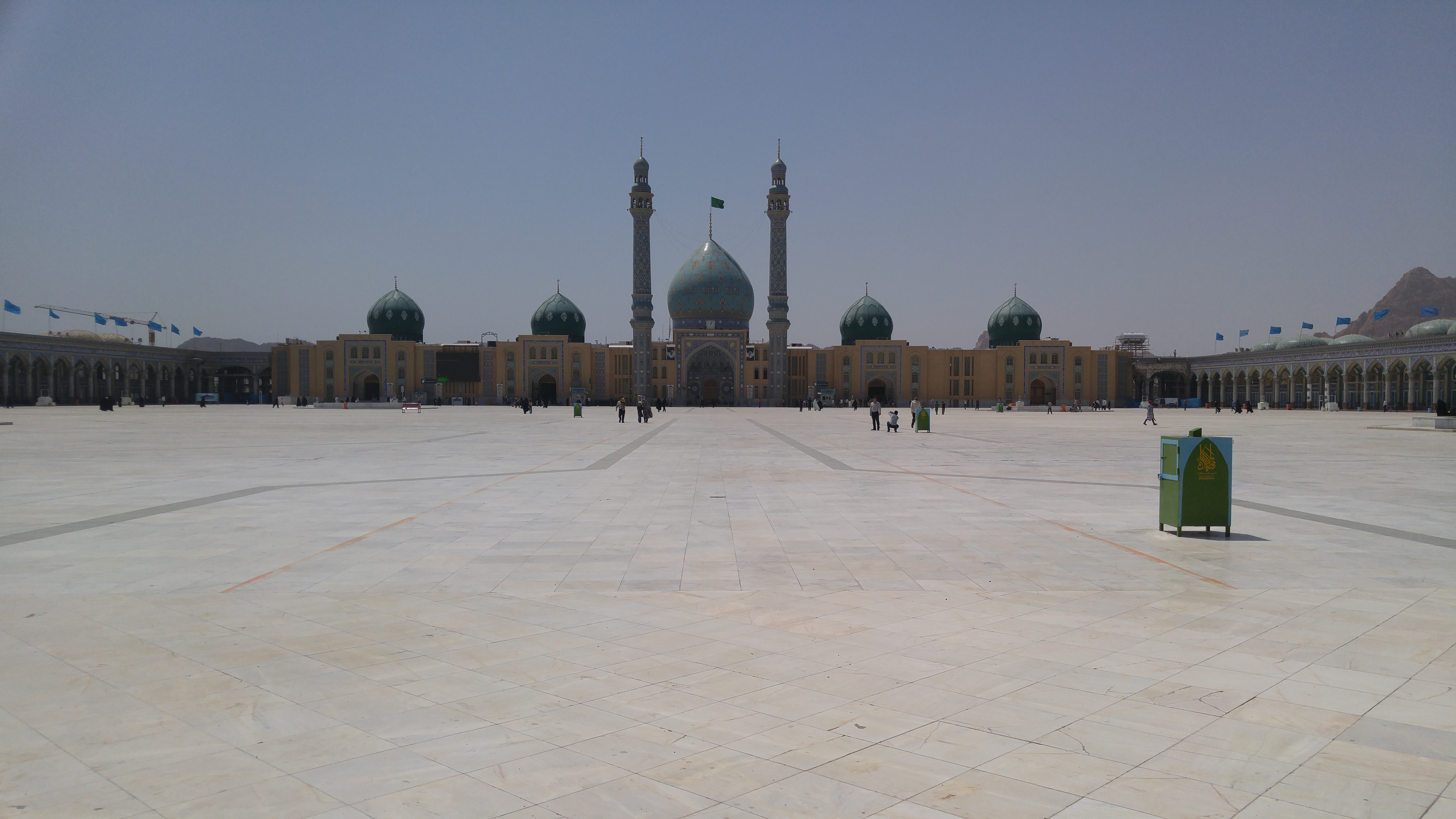

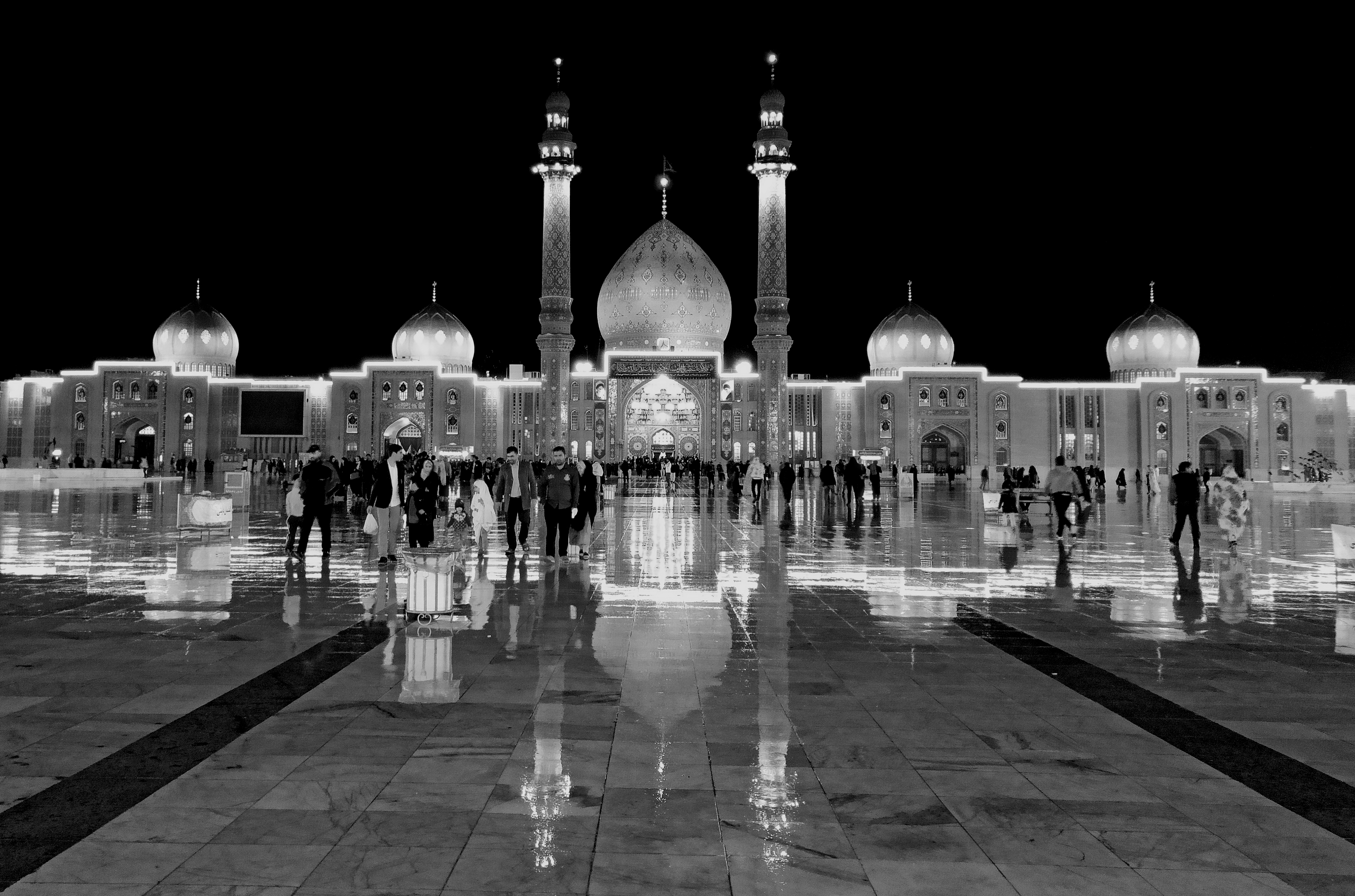

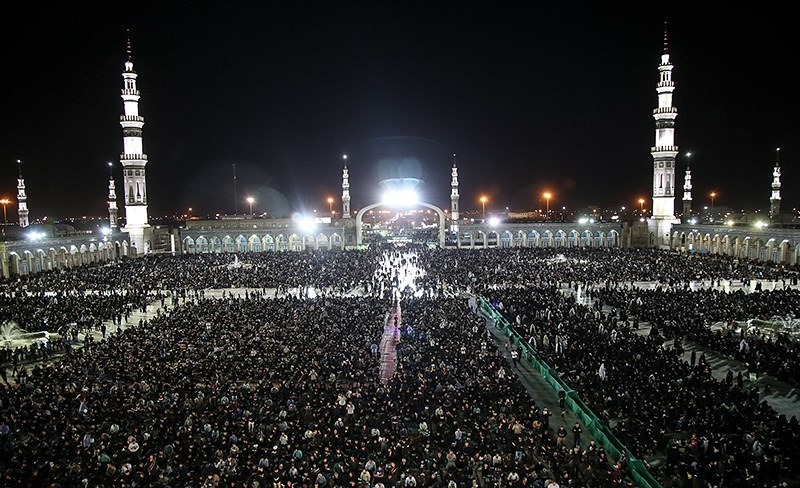

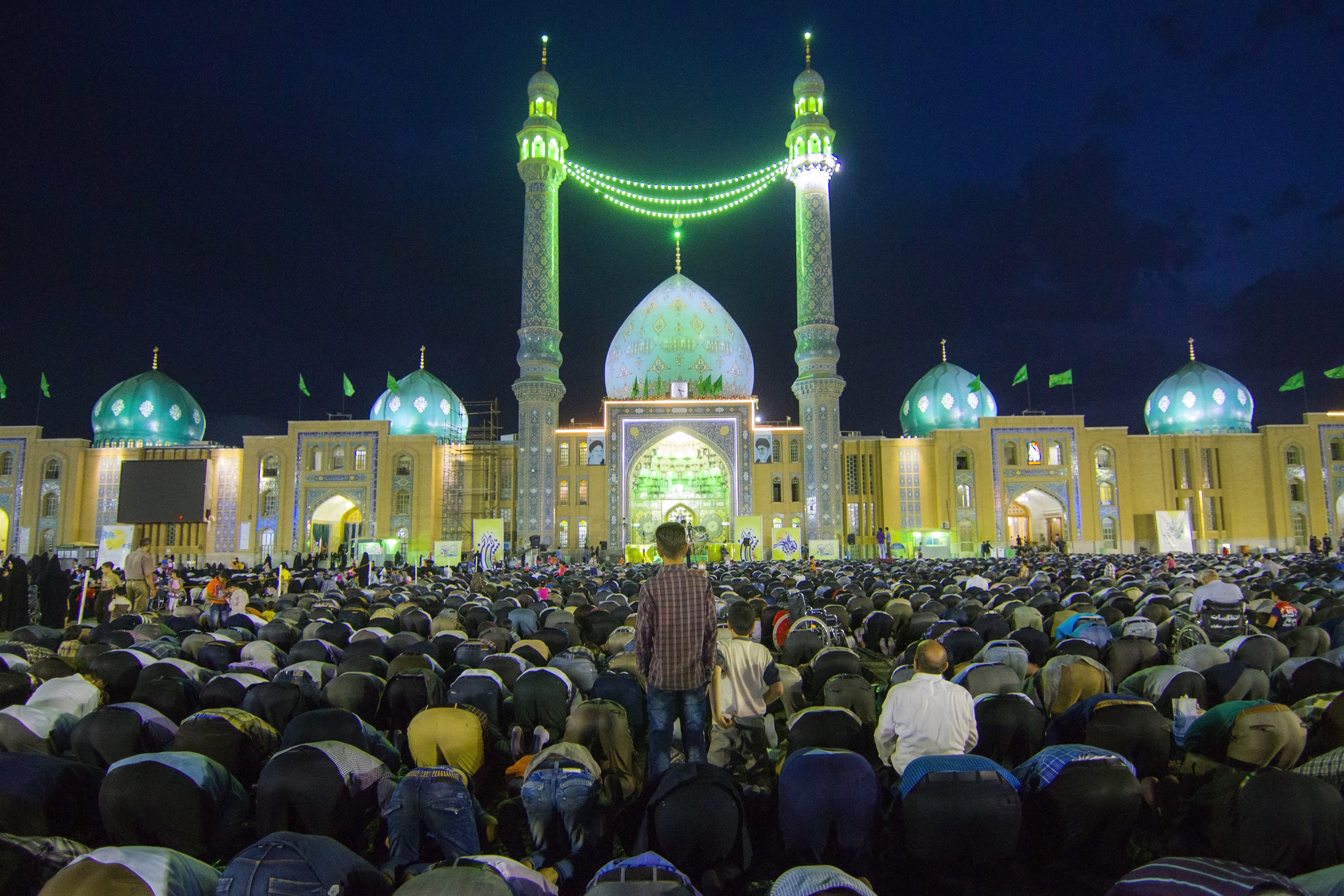

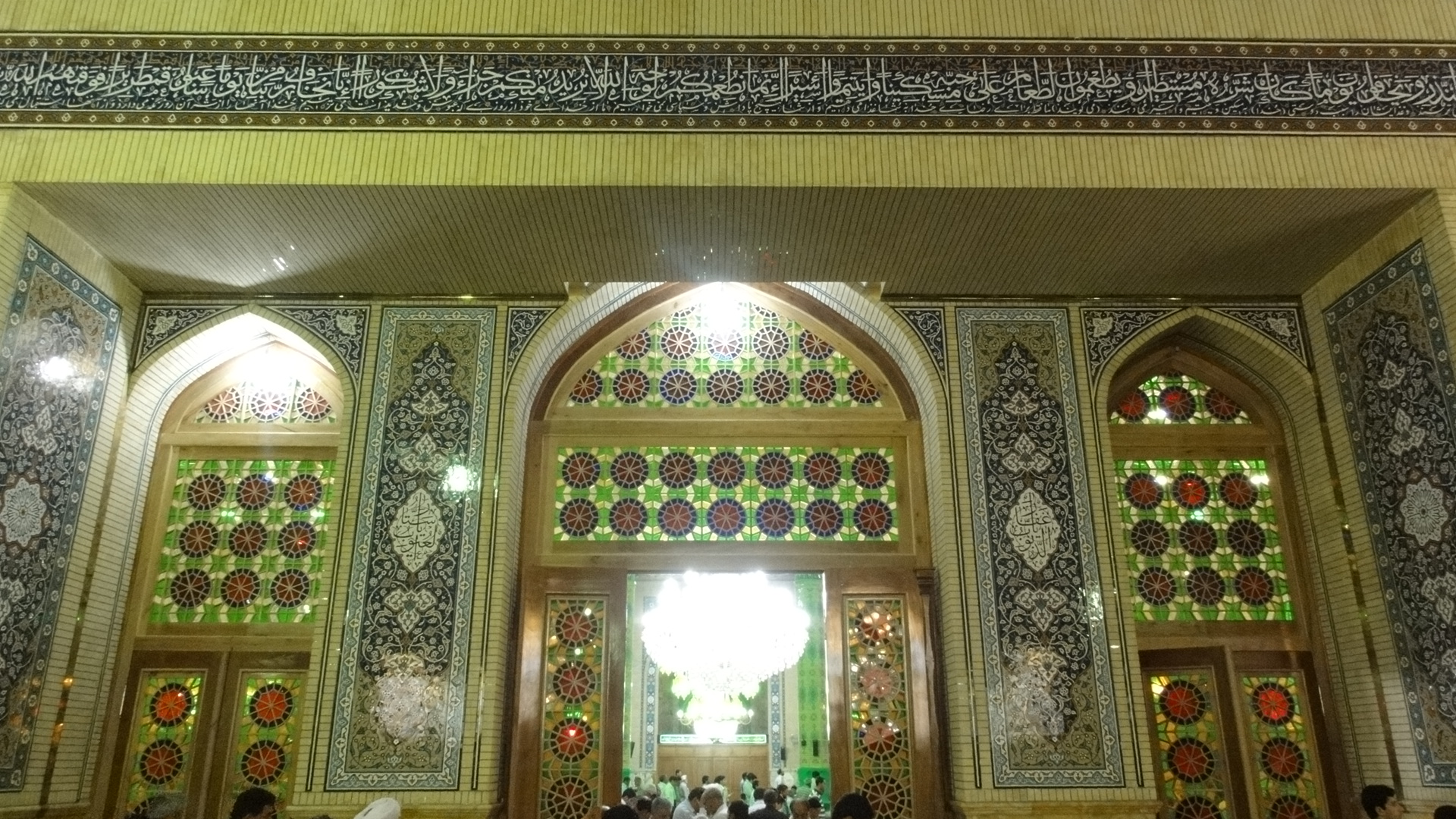

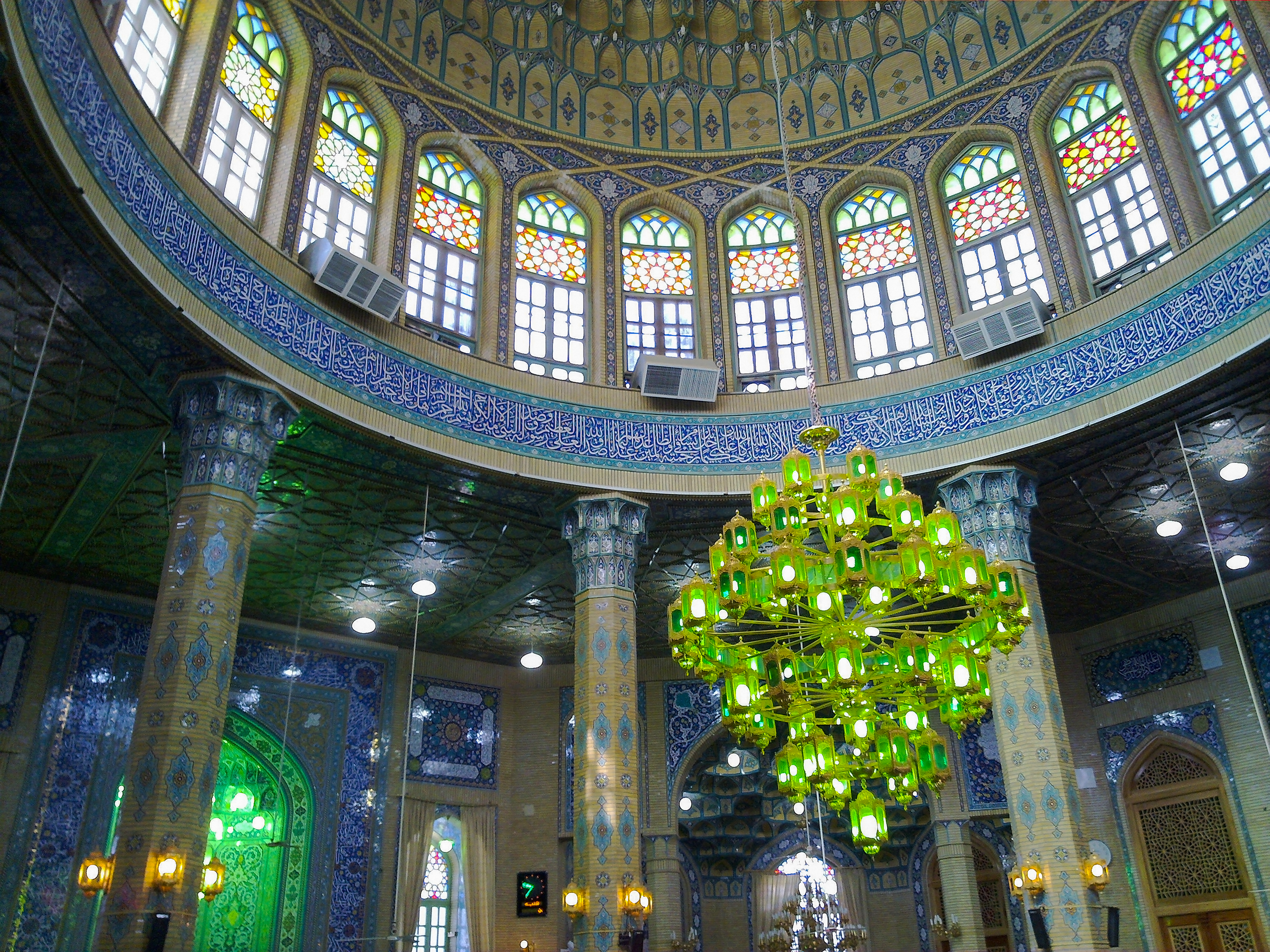

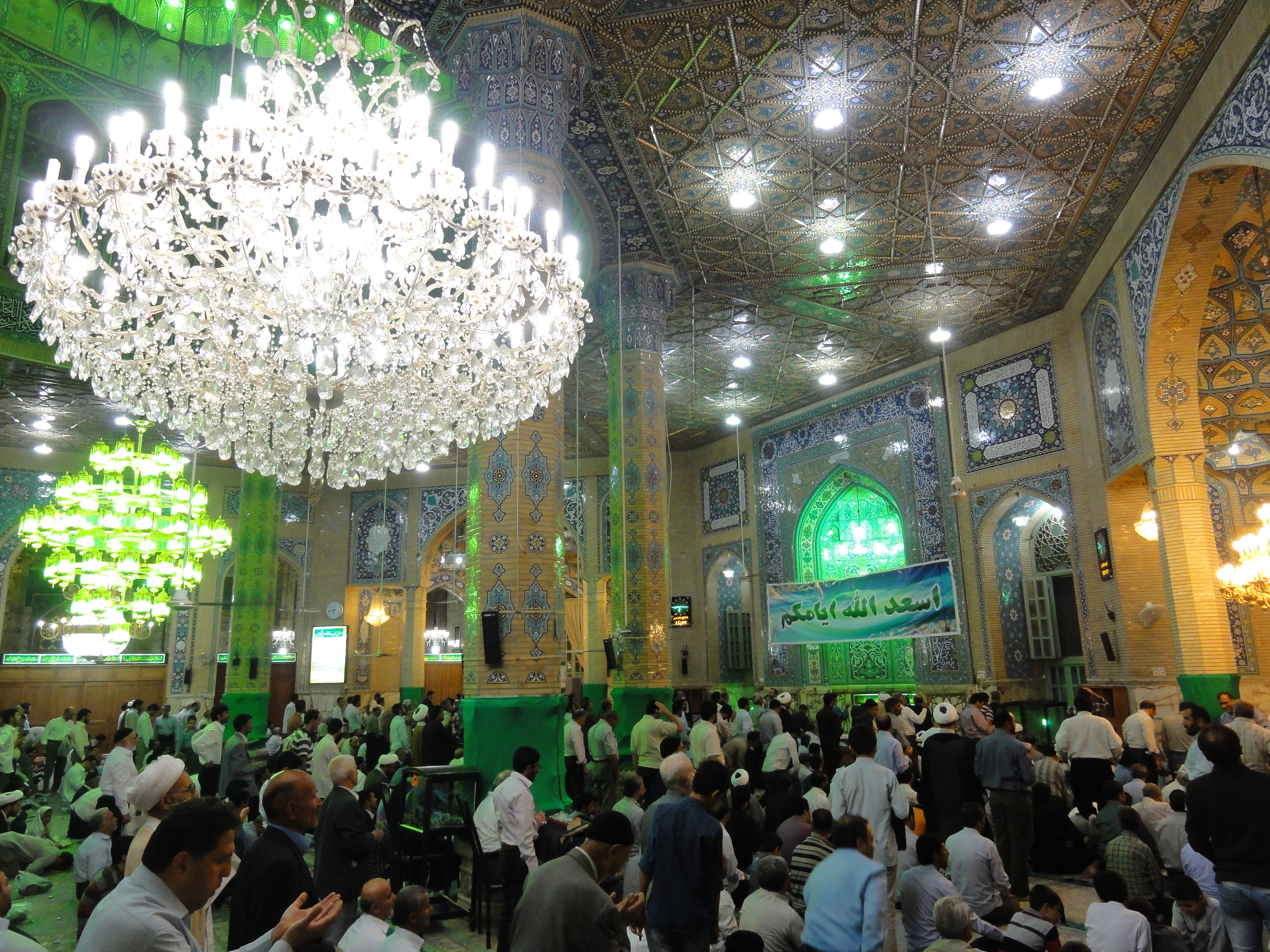

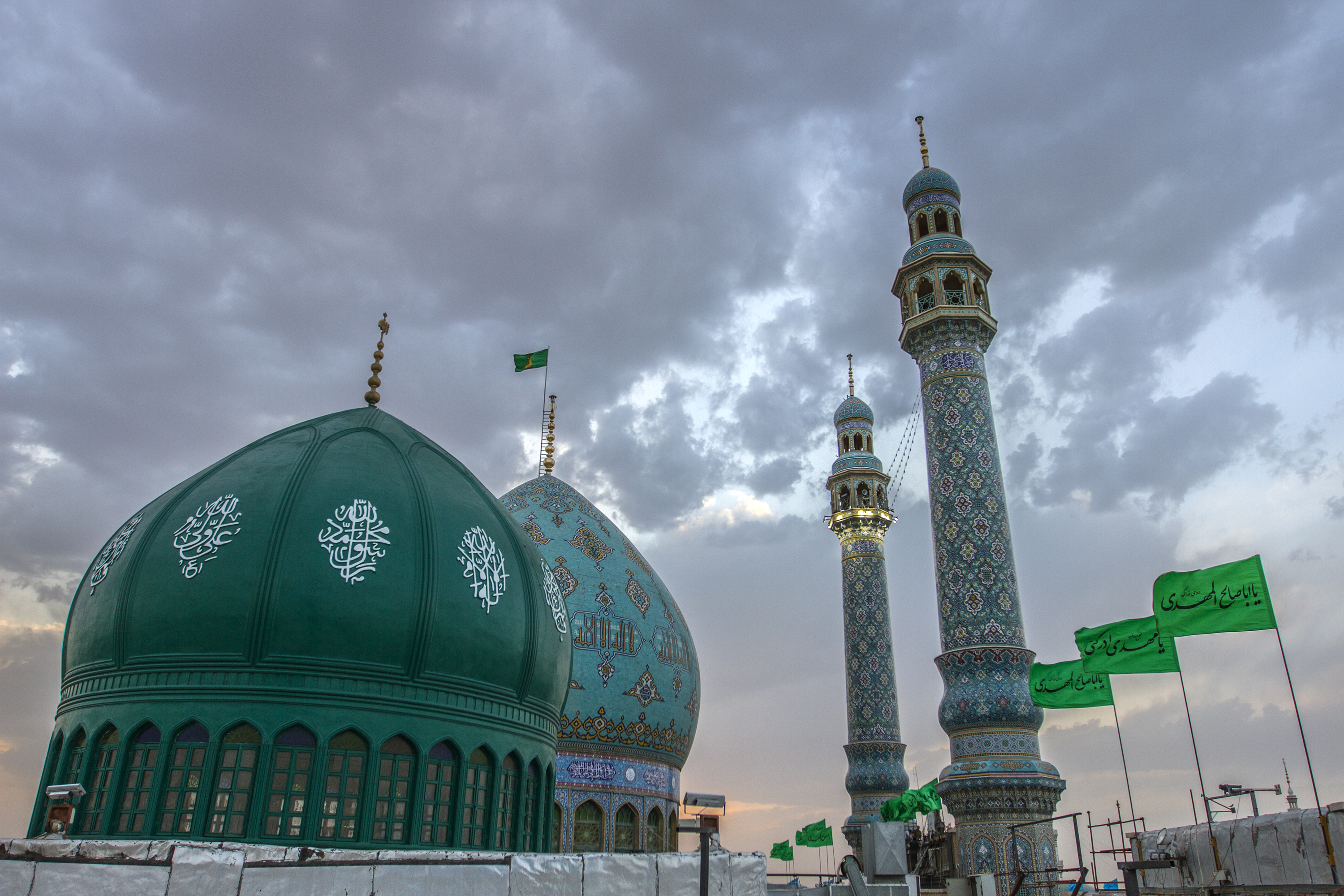

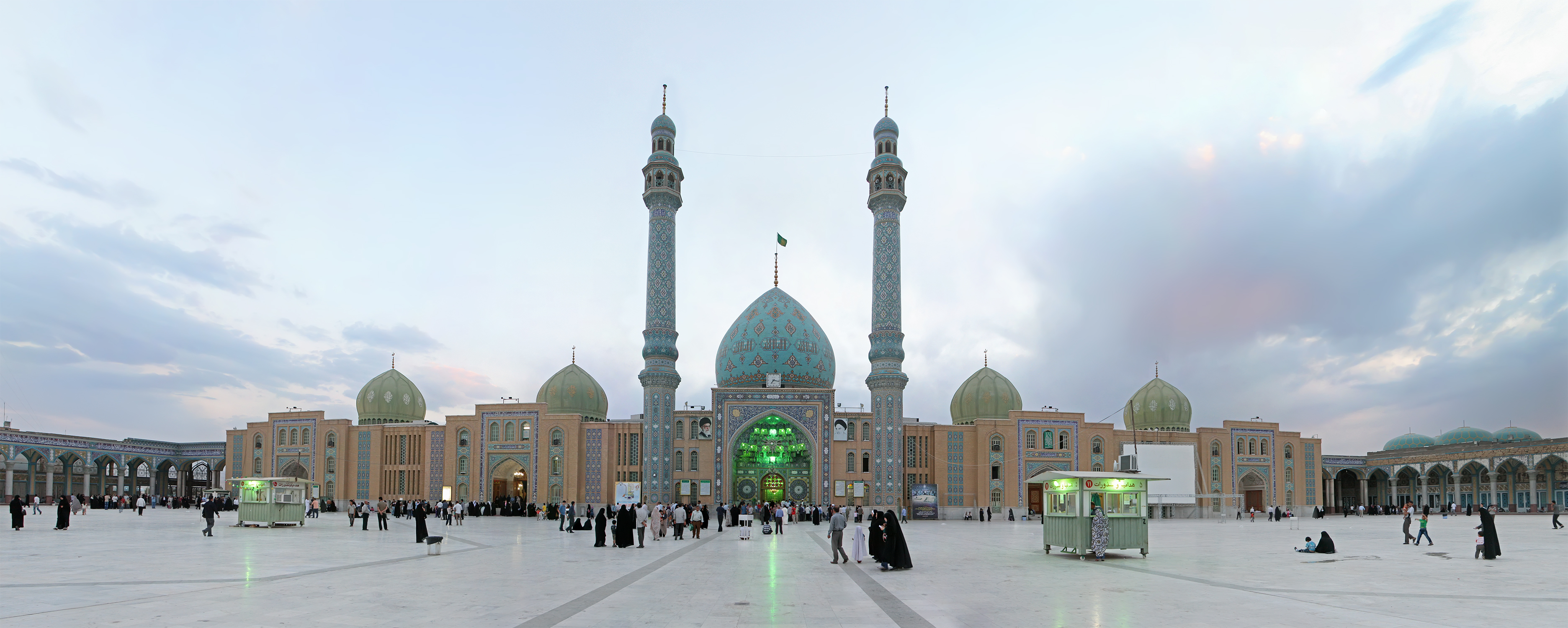

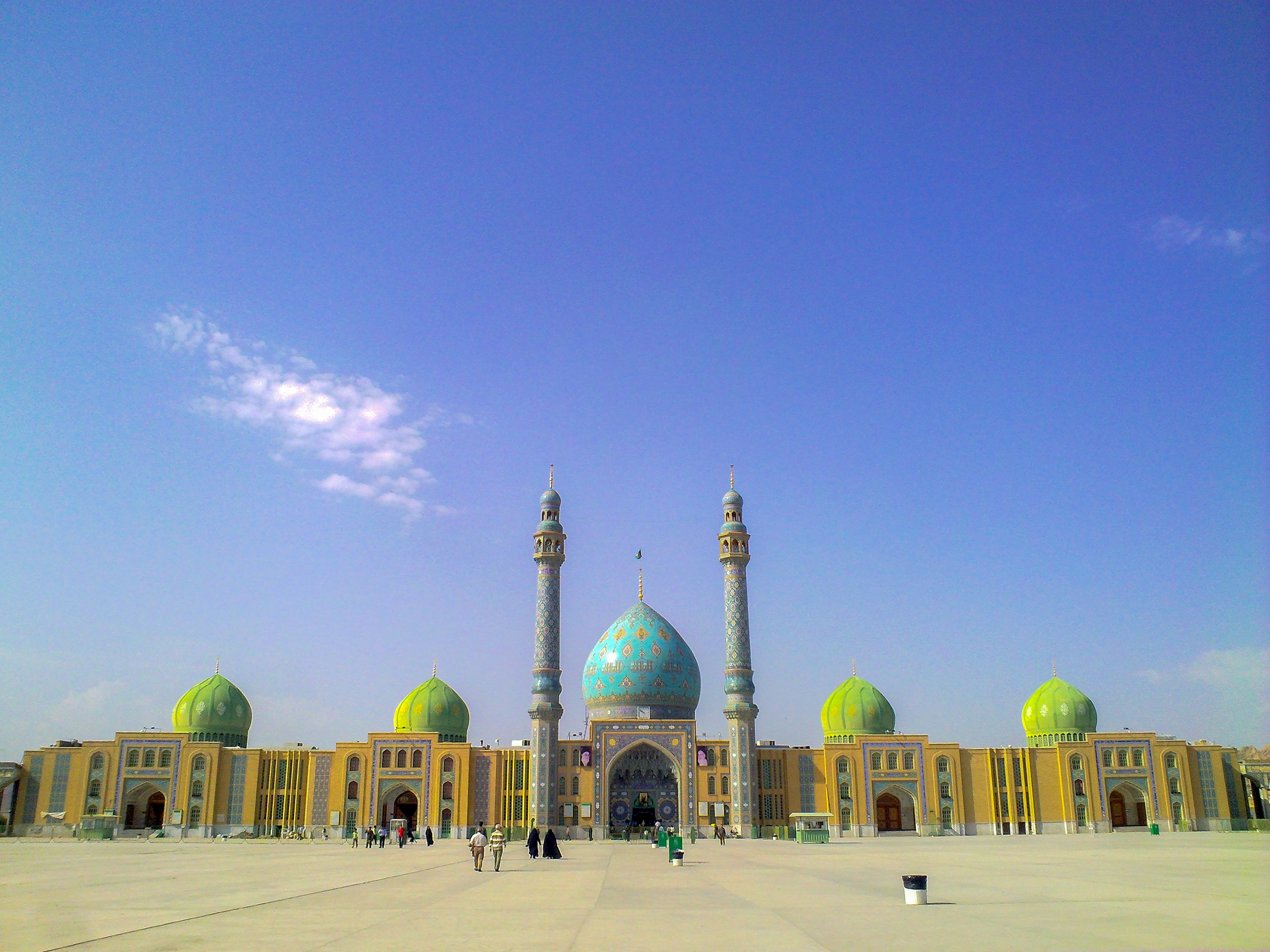

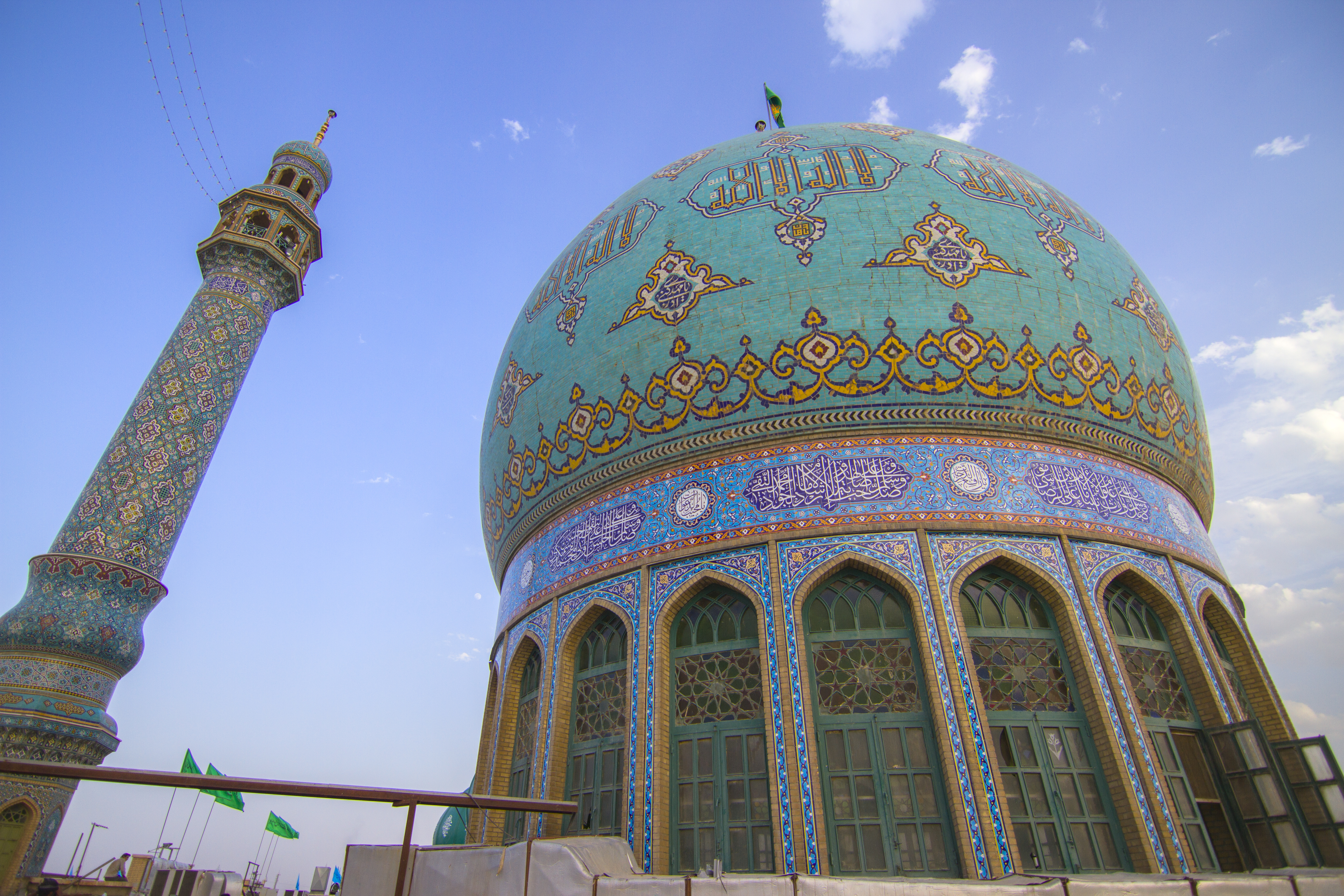

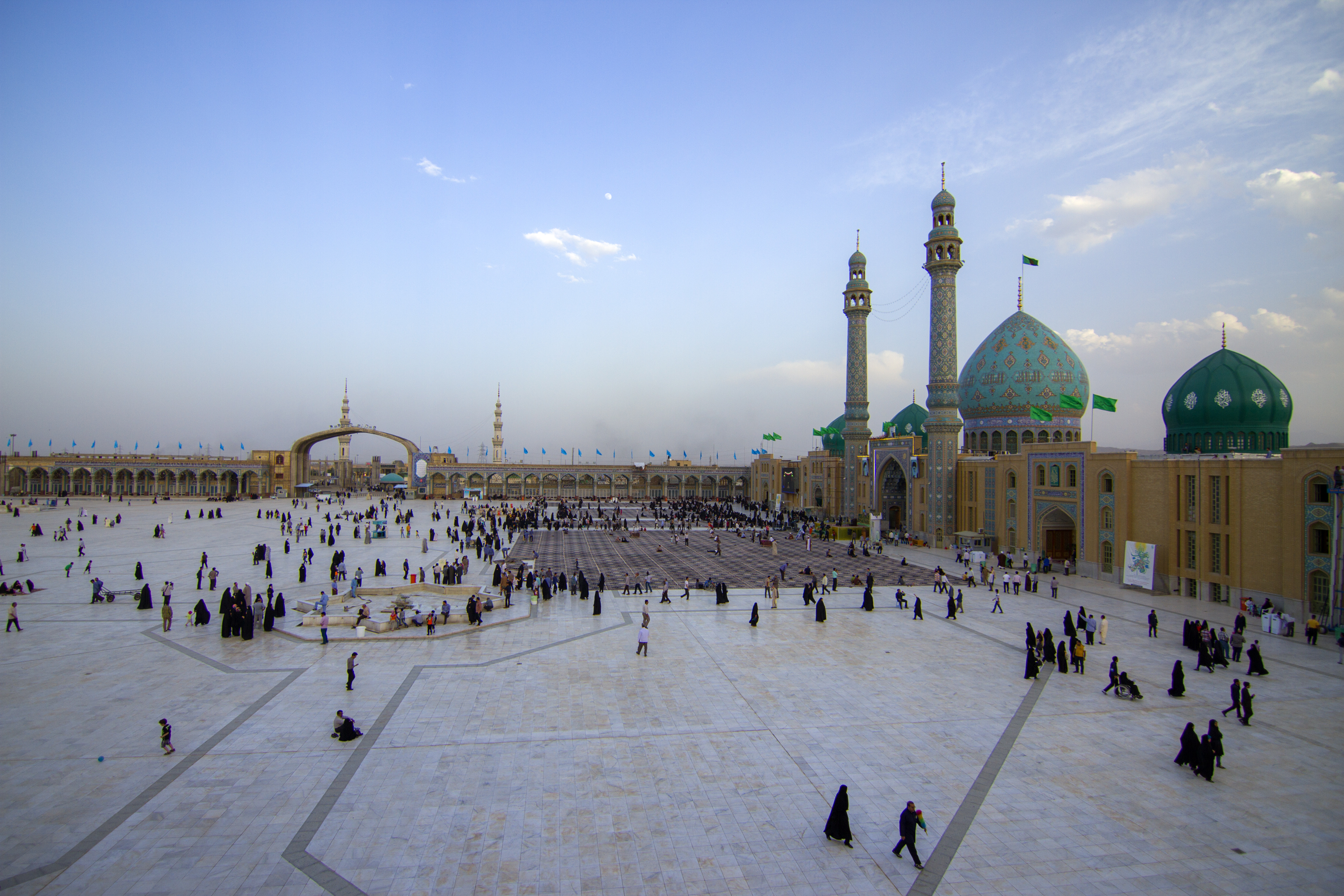

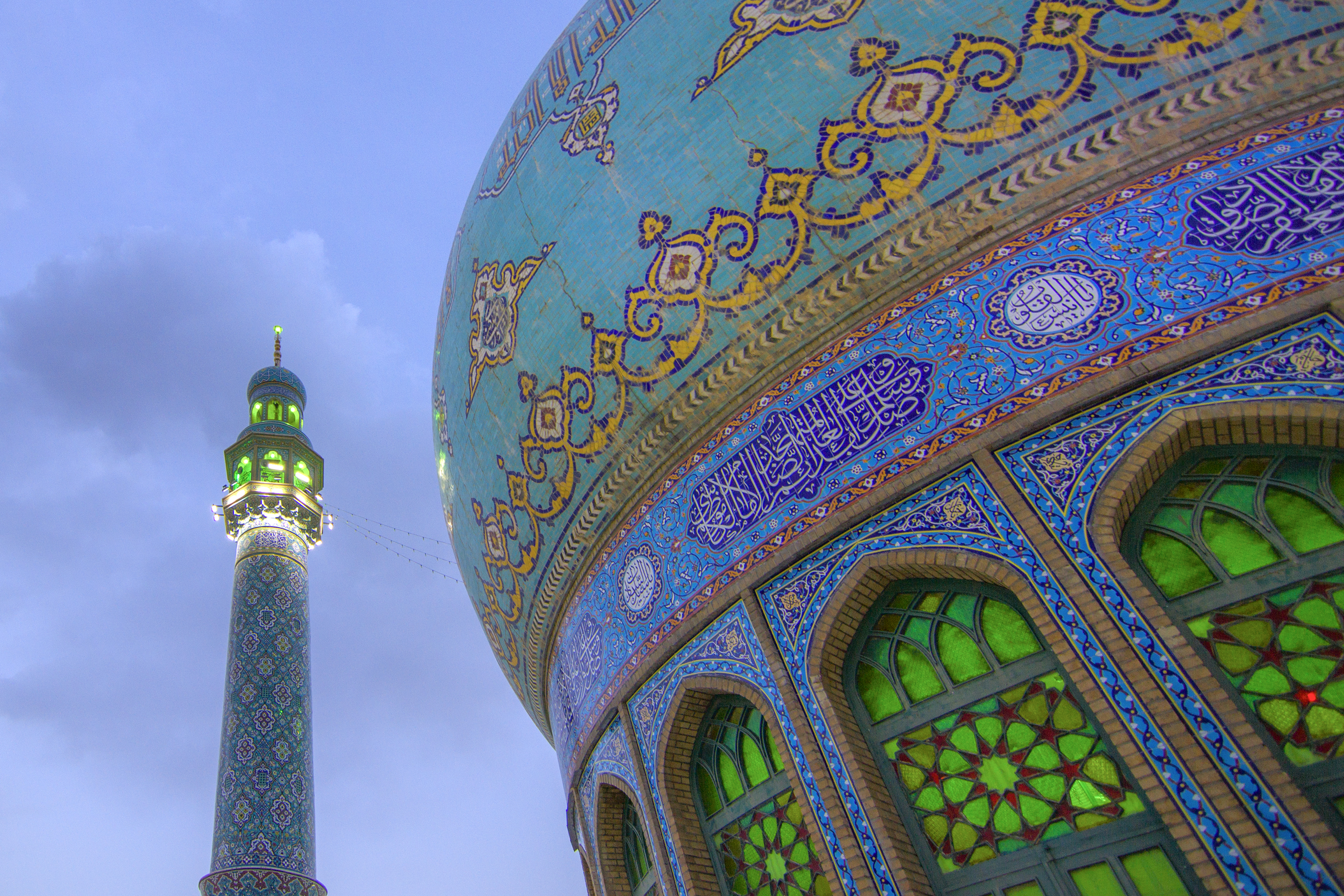

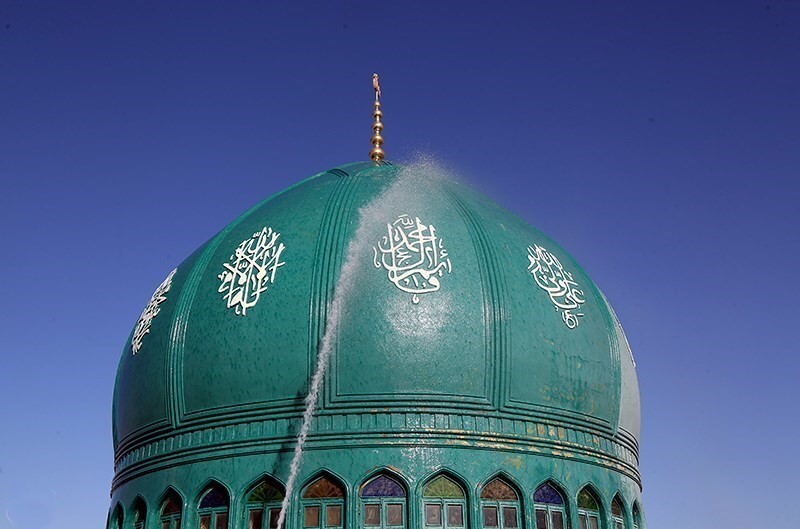

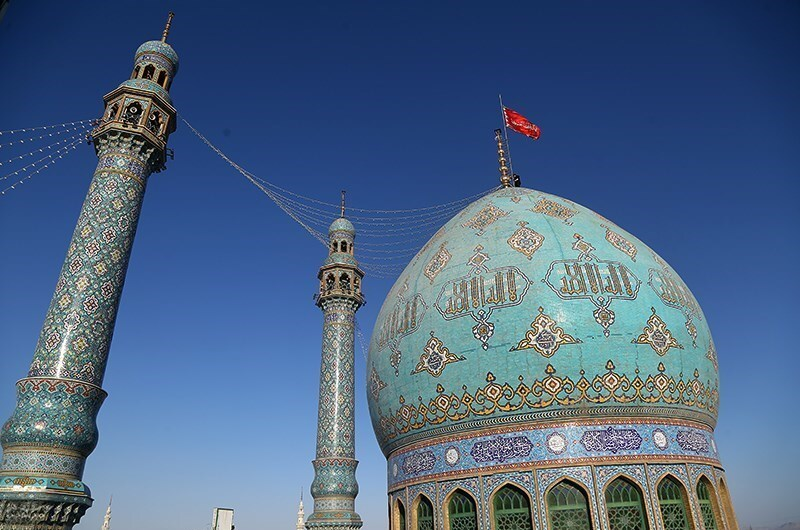

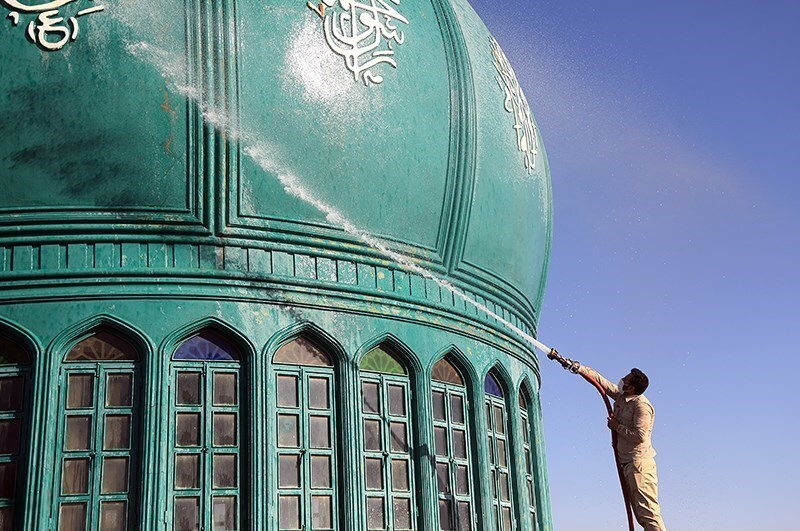

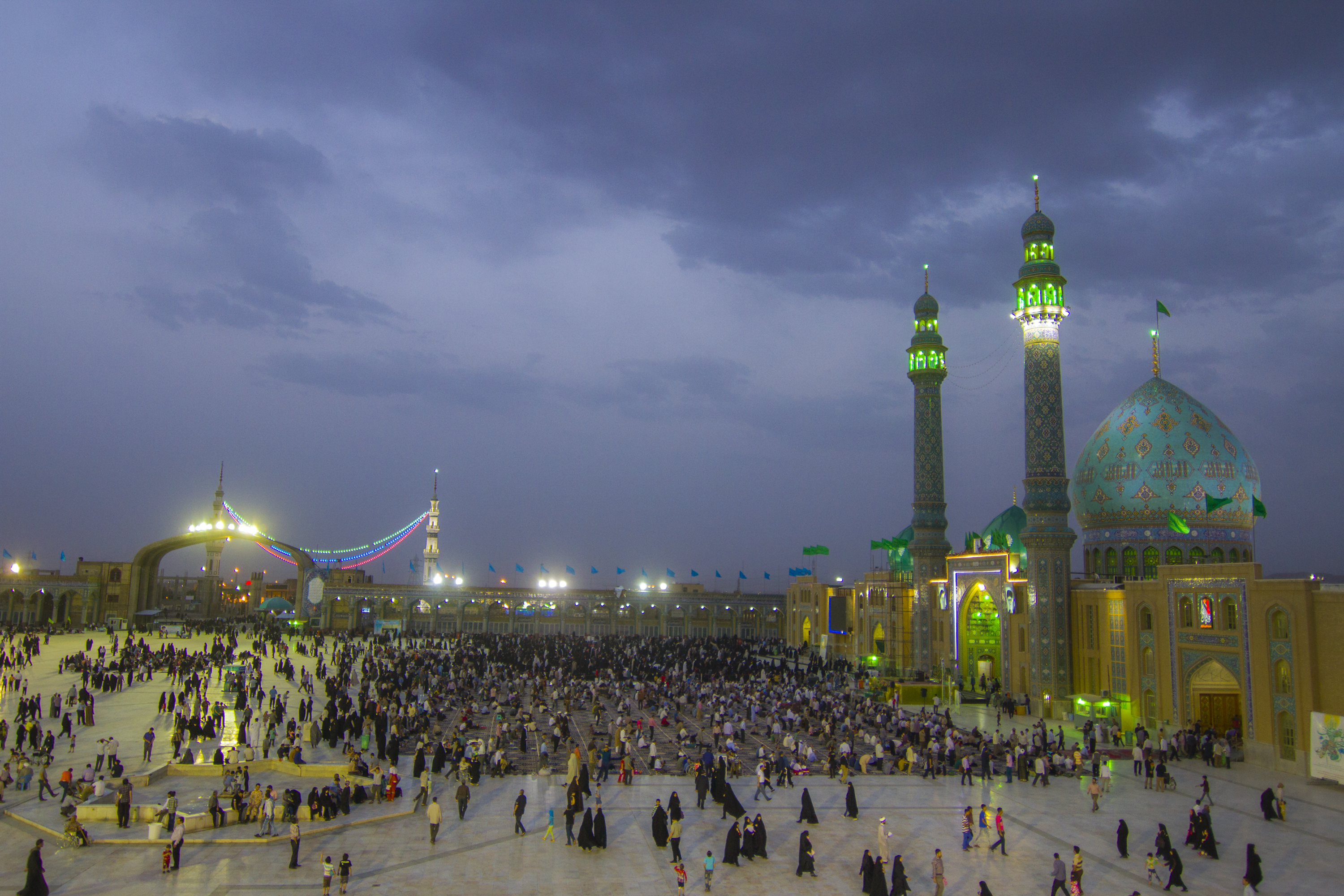

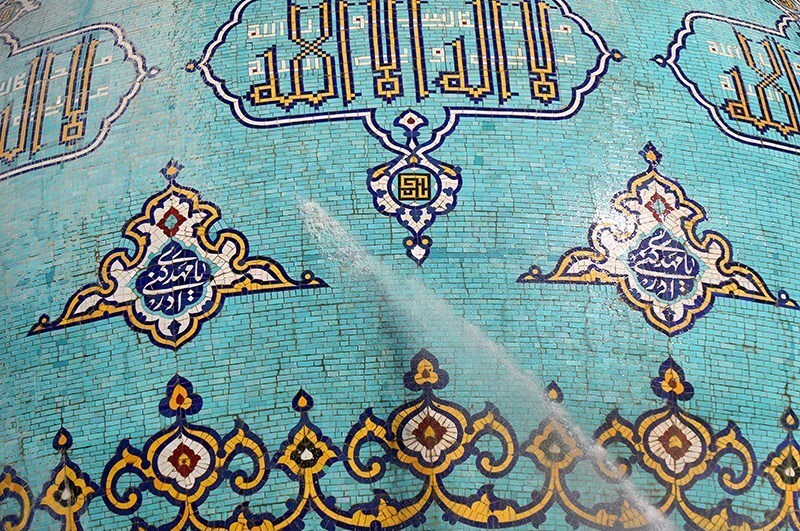

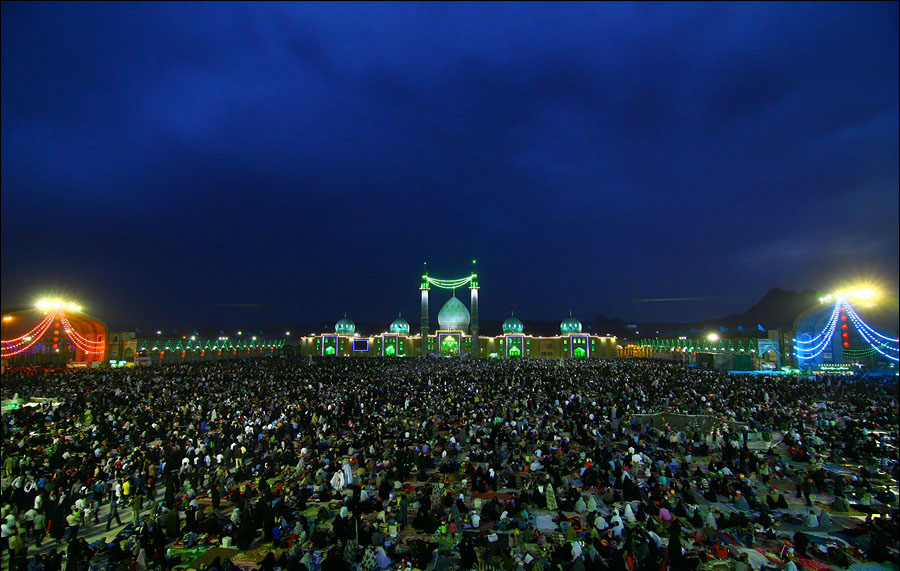

== See also ==
- Shia Islam in Iran
- List of mosques in Iran
