= Islamic holidays =

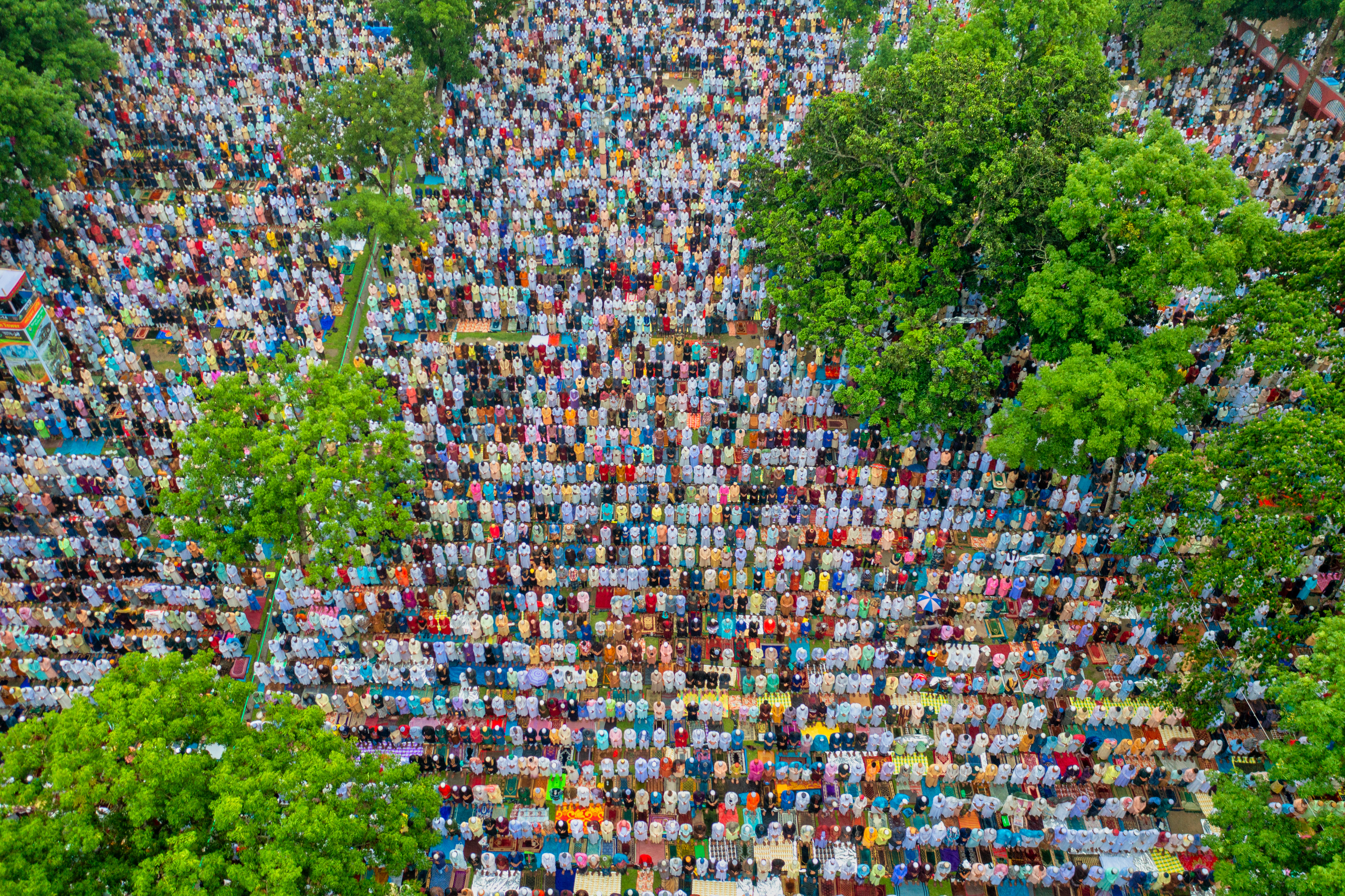
Eid celebration in Sholakia, Bangladesh. The largest Eid congregation.

There are two main holidays in Islam that are celebrated by Muslims worldwide: Eid al-Fitr and Eid al Adha. The timing of both holidays are set by the lunar Islamic calendar, which is based upon the cycle of the moon, and so is different from the more common, European, solar-based Gregorian calendar. Every year, the Gregorian dates of the Islamic holidays change.

Both Eid al-Fitr and Eid al-Adha follow a period of 9 holy days or nights: the last 9 nights of Ramadan for Eid al-Fitr, and the first 9 days of Dhu al-Hijjah for Eid al-Adha. The Night of Power (Arabic: لیلة القدر, romanized: Laylat al-Qadr), one of the last 10 nights of Ramadan, is the holiest night of the year. Conversely, the Day of Arafah, the day before Eid al-Adha, is the holiest day of the Islamic year.

There are a number of other days of note as well as festivals, some common to all Muslims, others specific to Shia Islam or branches thereof.

Additionally, Friday is considered the holiest day of the week, and, in Islamic tradition, is considered a celebration in itself. Friday prayers (Juma) are congregational prayers held in mosques, and Muslims are encouraged to wear clean and refined clothes, perfume, and bathe. It is customary to eat special meals with family on this day.

== Holidays ==
Eid al-Fitr is celebrated at the end of Ramadan (a month of fasting during daylight hours), and Muslims may perform acts of zakat (charity) on the occasion, which begins after the new moon is sighted for the beginning of the month of Shawwal. Celebration begins with prayers on the morning of 1 Shawwal, followed by breakfast, and often celebratory meals throughout the day.

Eid al-Adha is celebrated on the tenth day of Dhu al-Hijjah, when the Hajj pilgrimage takes place which lasts for four days. Muslims may perform an act of zakat and friendship by slaughtering a sheep or cow and distributing the meat to family, friends, and the poor. Muslims are also encouraged to be especially friendly and reach out to one another during this period.

== Religious practices ==
=== Fasting ===
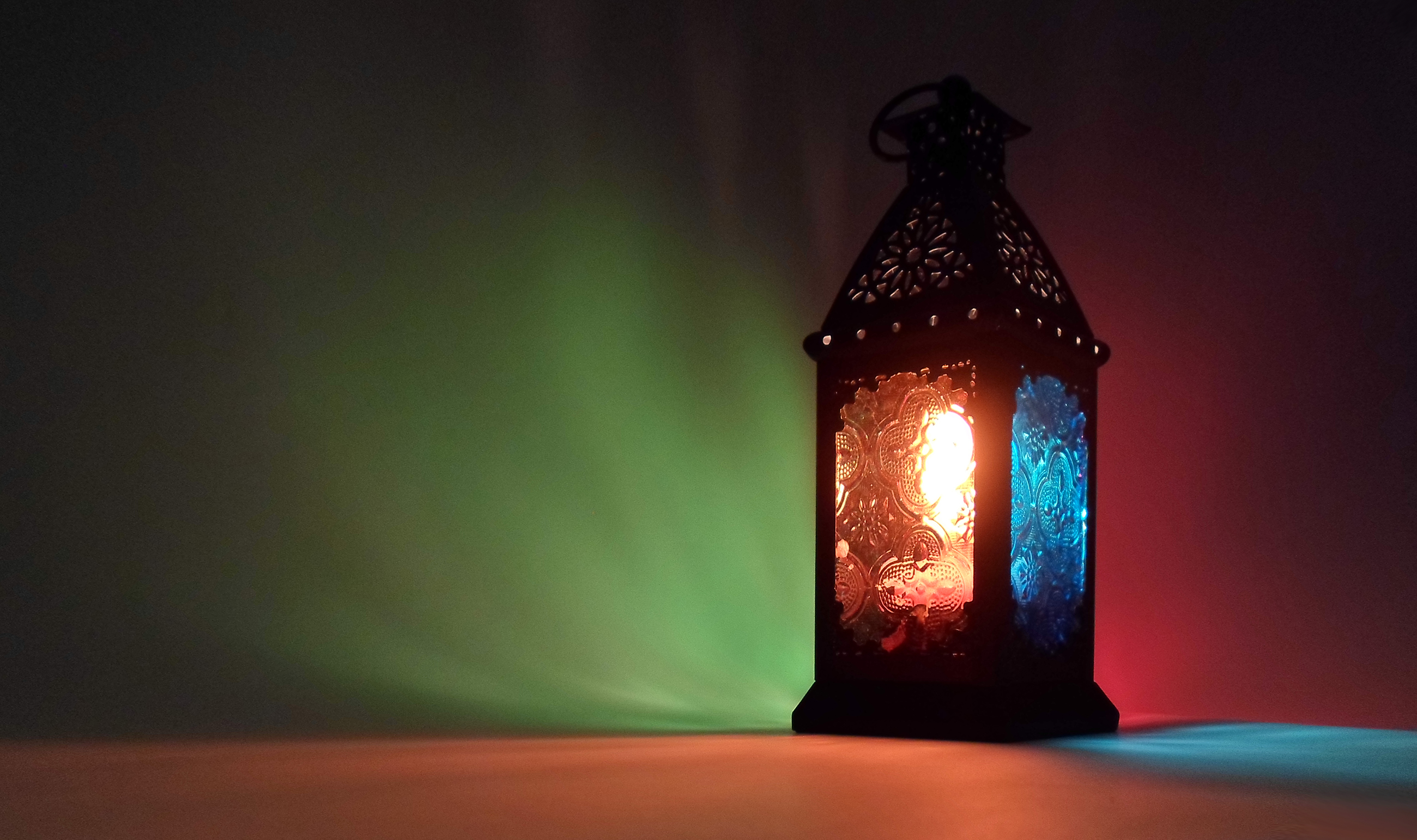
The Fanoos, a lantern used in homes, mosques and streets during Ramadan

Muslims celebrate when they believe the Quran was first revealed to Muhammed by fasting from dawn to sunset during Ramadan, the ninth month of the Islamic calendar. Fasting is considered a purifying experience so that Muslims can gain compassion and deepen their faith in God. Those with certain health conditions such as diabetes, and children are exempt from fasting. Travelers, and women who are menstruating or nursing a baby, are exempt from fasting but are required to fast later.

== Dates of holidays and other days of note ==
The Islamic calendar is based on the synodic period of the Moon's revolution around the Earth, approximately 29 1/2 days. The Islamic calendar alternates months of 29 and 30 days (which begin with the new moon). Twelve of these months make up an Islamic year, which is 11 days shorter than the Gregorian year. Some Gregorian dates may vary slightly from those given, and may also vary by country. See Islamic calendar.

Holiday Name	Hijri Date, 1448 AH	Gregorian Date, 2026-27
Islamic New Year	1 Muḥarram	17 June 2026
Tasu'a (Note: Primarily observed by Shias.)	9 Muharram	25 June 2026
Ashura	10 Muḥarram	26 June 2026
Arbaʽeen	20 or 21 Ṣafar (Note: Observed 40 days after Ashura.)	5 or 6 August 2026
Akhiri Chahar Shambah (Note: Primarily observed by Muslims in Iran and Indian subcontinent.)	Last Wednesday of Ṣafar	12 August 2026
Eid-e-Shuja' (Eid-e-Zahra) (Note: Primarily observed by Twelver Shias.)	9 Rabī‘ al-Awwal	22 August 2026
Mawlid an-Nabī (Birthday of Muhammad) (Note: Not observed by Wahhabis, Deobandis and Ahl-i-Hadith)	12 Rabī‘ al-Awwal	25 August 2026
Beginning the Three Holy Months	1 Rajab	11 December 2026
Laylat al-Raghaib	2 Rajab	12 December 2026
Birthday of ‘Alī ibn Abī Ṭālib	13 Rajab	23 December 2026
Laylat al-Mi'raj	26 Rajab or 27 Rajab (Note: There is some disagreement about this date; see Isra and Mi'raj.)	6 or 7 January 2027
Laylat al-Bara'at	15 Sha‘bān	25 January 2027
Birthday of Hujjat-Allah al-Mahdī	15 Sha‘bān	25 January 2027
First day of Ramaḍān	1 Ramaḍān	10 February 2027
Laylat al-Qadr	21, 23, 25, 27, or 29 Ramaḍān (Note: Most often observed on 23 Ramaḍān by Shias and 27 Ramaḍān by Sunnis; see Laylat al-Qadr.)	2, 4, 6, 8 and 10 March 2027
Jumu'atul-Wida	Last Friday in the month of Ramadan before Eid al-Fitr	5 March 2027
Chaand Raat (Note: Primarily observed in South Asia.)	1 or 2 Shawwāl	10 or 11 March 2027
Eid al-Fitr	1 Shawwāl	12 March 2027
Hajj	8–13 Dhū al-Ḥijja	16 - 21 May 2027
Day of Arafah	9 Dhū al-Ḥijja	17 May 2027
Eid al-Adha	10 Dhū al-Ḥijja	18 May 2027
Eid al-Ghadir	18 Dhū al-Ḥijja	26 May 2027
Eid al-Mubahalah	24 Dhū al-Ḥijja	1 June 2027
