= Mawlid =

Holiday commemorating the birthday of the Islamic prophet Muhammad

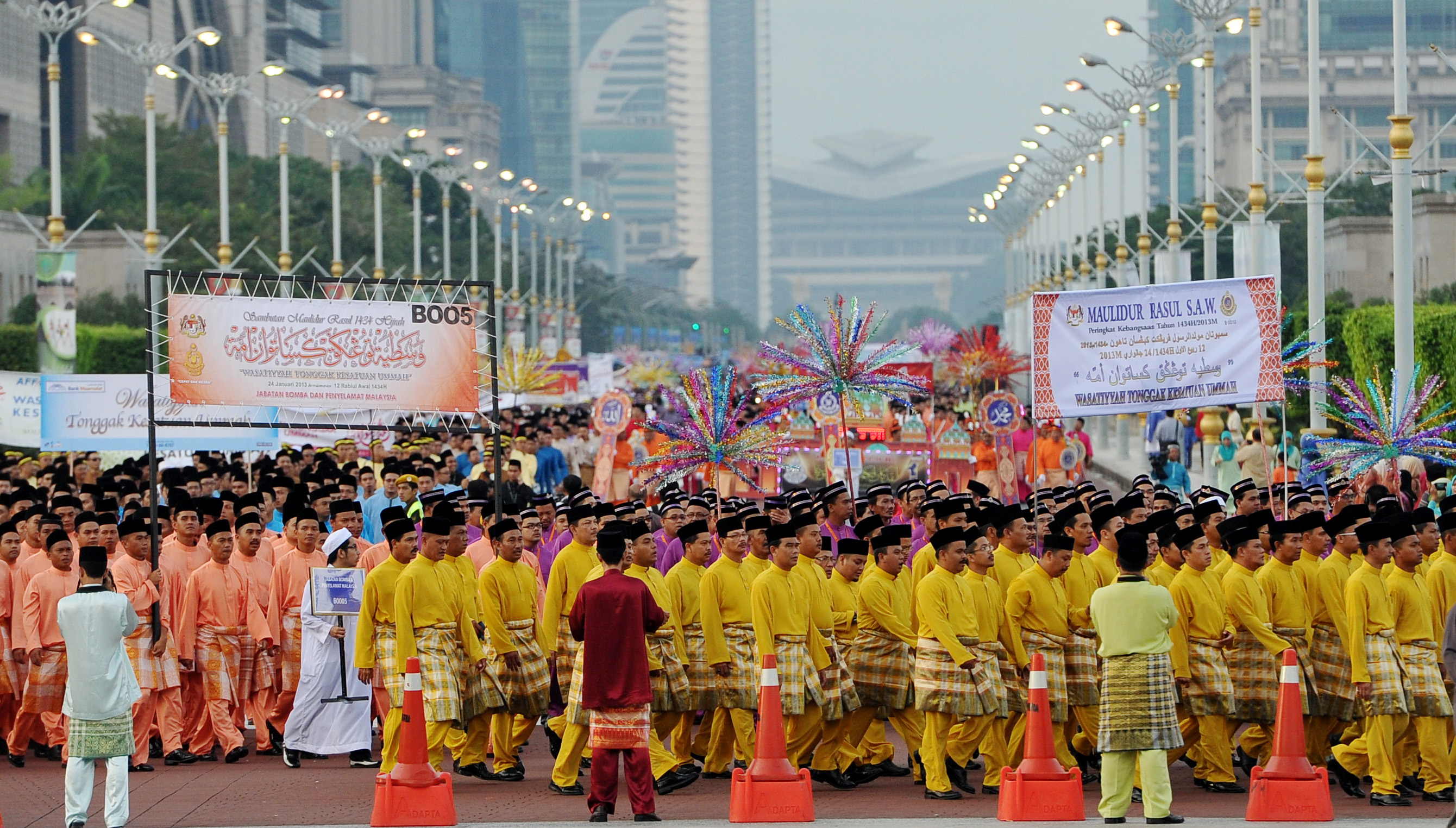
- Malaysian Muslims in a Mawlid procession in capital Putrajaya, 2013.
- Observed by: Mainstream Sunni Muslims and Shia Muslims
- Type: Islamic
- Significance: Commemoration of the birth of Muhammad
- Observances: Hamd, Tasbih, public processions, Na`at (religious poetry), Sawm (fasting), family and other social gatherings, decoration of streets and homes
- Date: 12 or 17 Rabi I
- 2026 date: 25/30 August
- Frequency: once every Hijri year

Mawlid (Arabic: مولد) is an annual festival commemorating the birthday of the Islamic prophet Muhammad on the date of 12 Rabi I, the third month of the Islamic calendar.

The Muslim general Gökböri, a deputy of Saladin (r. 1174–1193), is believed to have been the first to publicly celebrate Mawlid, which he did in an impressive ceremony at the Prophet's Mosque in Medina. The Ottomans under Sultan Murad III (r. 1574–1595) declared it an official holiday.

Celebrants hold mahfils on Mawlid in which religious poetry is recited in praise of Muhammad accompanied by a feast. Other customs affiliated with Mawlid are supererogatory fasting, prayer and dhikr.

Mawlid observance is a recognized national holiday in most Muslim-majority countries of the world. It is generally approved by the Hanafi, Maliki and Shafi'i schools of Sunni Islam, as well as by Shia Muslims. However, Salafism and Wahhabism regard celebration of the Mawlid a reprehensible bid'a (innovation) and prohibit its observance. Deobandi jurists take an intermediate position, viewing the matter as an issue of Ikhtilaf (scholarly disagreement).

== Etymology ==
The term Mawlid is derived from the Arabic root word walad, meaning "to give birth" or "descendant". Although it is a generic term for any day of birth, Mawlid usually refers to the observance of the birthday of Muhammad. The day is also known as Mawlid al-Nabi and sometimes spelled Milad in some areas.

Along with being referred to as the celebration of the birth of Muhammad, the term Mawlid refers to the 'text especially composed for and recited at Muhammad's nativity celebration' or "a text recited or sung on that day".

== Date ==
According to the majority of Sunni Muslims, Muhammad was born on the 12th of Rabi I. Many Twelver Shia Muslims on the other hand assert that Muhammad was born on the 17th of Rabi I. It stands as a matter of ikhtilaf or disagreement since prominent Shia scholars such as Muhammad ibn Ya'qub al-Kulayni, Ibn Babawayh, and Zayn al-Din al-Juba'i al-'Amili have affirmed the date of the 12th of Rabi' al-Awal. Nonetheless, others contend that the date of Muhammad's birth is unknown and is not definitively recorded in the Islamic traditions. The issue of the correct date of the Mawlid is recorded by Ibn Khallikan as constituting the first proven disagreement concerning the celebration.

== History ==
The Ottomans declared it an official holiday in 1588, known as Mevlid Kandil. The term Mawlid is also used in some parts of the world, such as Egypt, as a generic term for the birthday celebrations of other historical religious figures such as Sufi saints.

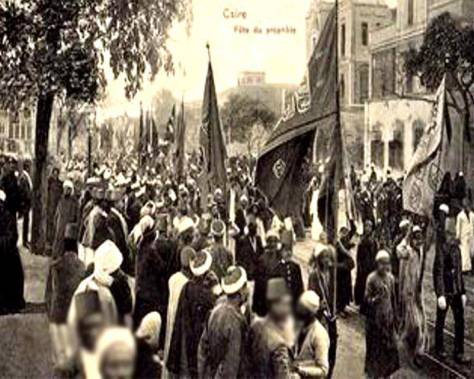
Mawlid an-Nabi procession at Boulac Avenue in 1904 at Cairo, Egypt.

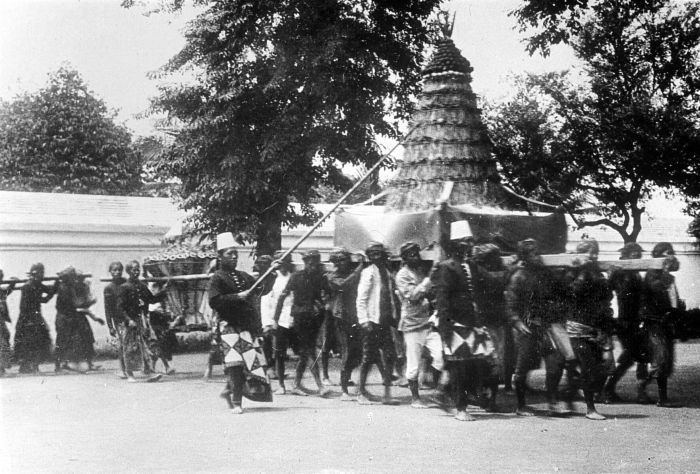
The Garebeg festival celebrating Mawlid in Yogyakarta, Java Island, Indonesia.

In the early days of Islam, observation of Muhammad's birth as a holy day was usually arranged privately, and later was an increased number of visitors to the Mawlid house that was open for the whole day specifically for this celebration. The history of this celebration goes back to the early days of Islam when some of the Tabi‘un began to hold sessions in which poetry and songs composed to honour Muhammad were recited and sung to the crowds.

The early celebrations included elements of Sufi influence, with animal sacrifices and torchlight processions along with public sermons and a feast. The celebrations occurred during the day, in contrast to modern day observances, with the ruler playing a key role in the ceremonies. Emphasis was given to the Ahl al-Bayt with presentation of sermons and recitations of the Qur'an.

The exact origins of the Mawlid are difficult to trace. According to Muhammad in History, Thought, and Culture: An Encyclopedia of the Prophet of God, the significance of the event was established when Muhammad fasted on Monday, citing the reason for this was his birth on that day, and when Umar took into consideration Muhammad's birth as a possible starting time for the Islamic calendar. According to Festivals in World Religions, the Mawlid was first introduced by the Abbasids in Baghdad. It has been suggested that the Mawlid was first formalized by al-Khayzuran of the Abbasids. One of the earliest recorded Mawlid celebrations took place in the 8th century when al-Khayzuran, mother of Harun al-Rashid, invited people to pray, celebrate and rejoice at the site where Muhammad was born.

Ibn Jubayr, in 1183, writes that Muhammad's day of birth was celebrated every Monday of Rabi I at his birthplace, which had been converted priorly into a place of devotion under the Abbasids.

According to the hypothesis of Nico Kaptein of Leiden University, the Mawlid was initiated by the Fatimids. It has been stated, "The idea that the celebration of the mawlid originated with the Fatimid dynasty has today been almost universally accepted among both religious polemicists and secular scholars." Annemarie Schimmel also says that the tendency to celebrate the memory of Muhammad's day of birth on a larger and more festive scale emerged first in Egypt during the Fatimids. The Egyptian historian Maqrizi (d. 1442) describes one such celebration held in 1122 as an occasion in which mainly scholars and religious establishments participated. They listened to sermons, distributed sweets, particularly honey, Muhammad's favourite and the poor received alms. This Shia origin is frequently noted by those Sunnis who oppose Mawlid. According to Encyclopædia Britannica, however, what the Fatimids did was simply a procession of court officials, which did not involve the public but was restricted to the court of the Fatimid caliph. Therefore, it has been concluded that the first Mawlid celebration which was a public festival was started by Sunnis in 1207 by Muẓaffar al-Dīn Gökburi.

It has been suggested that the celebration was introduced into the city Ceuta by Abu al-Abbas al-Azafi as a way of strengthening the Muslim community and to counteract Christian festivals.

=== Start of a public holiday ===
In 1207, the Turkic general Gökböri started the first annual public festival of the Mawlid in Erbil. Gökböri was the brother-in-law of Saladin and soon the festival began to spread across the Muslim world. Since Saladin and Gokburi were both Sufis the festival became increasingly popular among Sufi devotees which remains so till this day. The Ottomans declared it an official holiday in 1588, known as Mevlid Kandil. It is a national holiday in most parts of the Muslim world except Saudi Arabia and Qatar which are officially Salafi.

Public holiday
Country	Status	Reference
Afghanistan	National	
Algeria	National	
Australia	Regional (Cocos (Keeling) Islands)	
Bahrain	National	
Bangladesh	National	
Brunei	National	
Chad	National	
Comoros	National	
Djibouti	National	
Egypt	National	
Ethiopia	National	
Gambia	National	
Guinea	National	
India	Regional (Andhra Pradesh, Bihar, Chhattisgarh, Goa, Gujarat, Jammu and Kashmir, Jharkhand, Karnataka, Kerala, Lakshadweep, Madhya Pradesh, Maharashtra, Manipur, Mizoram, Nagaland, National Capital Territory, Odisha, Puducherry, Rajasthan, Tamil Nadu, Telangana, Tripura, Uttar Pradesh, Uttarakhand, West Bengal)	
Indonesia	National	
Iran	National	
Iraq	National	
Israel	Optional (recognized for Muslims)	
Ivory Coast	National	
Jordan	National	
Kuwait	National	
Lebanon	National	
Libya	National	
Malaysia	National	
Maldives	National	
Mali	National	
Mauritania	National	
Morocco	National	
Niger	National	
Nigeria	National	
Oman	National	
Pakistan	National	
Palestine	National	
Senegal	National	
Sierra Leone	National	
Somalia	National	
Sudan	National	
Syria	National	
Tanzania	National	
Tunisia	National	
UAE	National	
Yemen	National	

== Observances ==
=== Where ===
Mawlid is celebrated in almost all Islamic countries, and in other countries that have a significant Muslim population, such as Ethiopia, India, the United Kingdom, Turkey, Nigeria, Côte d'Ivoire, Iraq, Iran, Maldives, Morocco, Jordan, Libya, Russia and Canada. Hari Maulaud Nabi is a public holiday in the Cocos (Keeling) Islands.

In the last decades of the late 20th century there has been a trend to "forbid or discredit" Mawlid because of the rise of Salafism.

=== Sunni celebration ===
The first recorded Sunni Mawlid celebration was sponsored by Saladin's general, Muzaffar al-Din Kokburi (Gökböri) and included the slaughtering of thousands of animals for a banquet which is believed to have cost 300,000 dirhams.

The presence of guests and the distribution of monetary gifts at mawlid festivals had an important social function as they symbolized "concretizing ties of patronage and dramatizing the benevolence of the ruler" and also held religious significance, as "issues of spending and feeding were pivotal both to the religious and social function of the celebration." Often organized in some countries by the Sunni Sufi orders, Mawlid is celebrated in a carnival manner, large street processions are held and homes or mosques are decorated. Charity and food is distributed, and stories about the life of Muhammad are narrated with recitation of poetry by children.

Scholars and poets celebrate by reciting Qaṣīda al-Burda Sharif, the famous poem by 13th-century Arabic Sufi Busiri. A general Mawlid appears as "a chaotic, incoherent spectacle, where numerous events happen simultaneously, all held together only by the common festive time and space". These celebrations are often considered an expression of the Sufi concept of the pre-existence of Muhammad. However, the main significance of these festivities is the expression of love for Muhammad.

=== Theological pros and cons ===
Early fatwas and criticisms of the mawlid have taken issue with the "possibility of coerced giving" as hosts often took monetary contributions from their guests for festival costs.

Jurists often conceptualized the observance of Muhammad's day of birth as a "form of reciprocation for God's bestowal of the Prophet Muhammad" as a way of justifying celebrations. According to this thought, the bestowal of such a gift required thanks, which came in the form of the celebration of the mawlid. Ibn Rajab al-Hanbali (1392 CE) and Ibn Hajar al-Asqalini (1449 CE) both expressed such ideas, specifically referencing the hadith about the Jews and the fast of ‘Ashura’, but broadening the conception of "thanks to God" to multiple forms of worship including prostration, fasting, almsgiving, and Qur’anic recitation. The only limitation Ibn Hajar places on forms of celebration is that they must be neutral under Shari’a.

=== By country ===
==== Pakistan ====
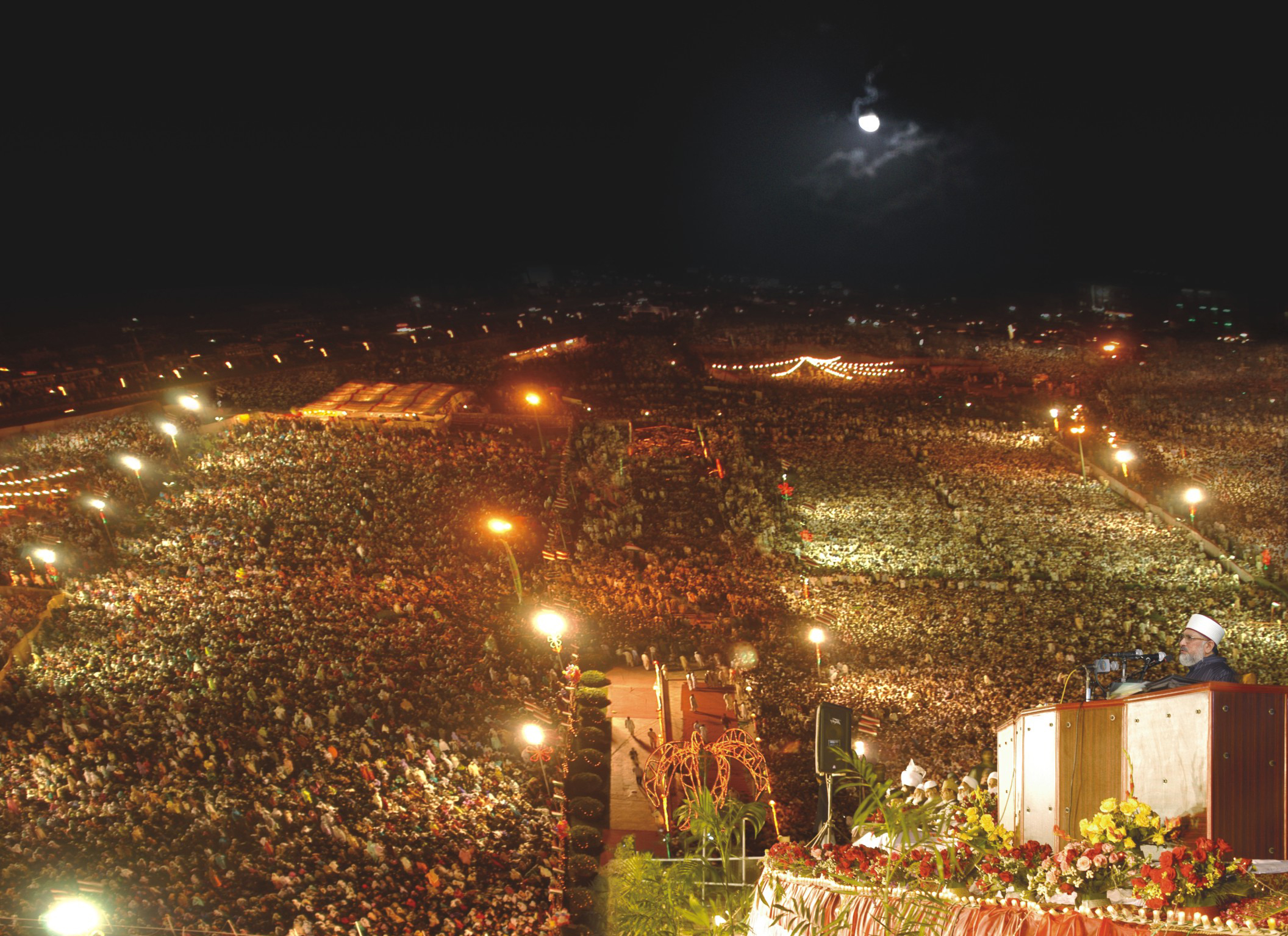
International Mawlid Conference, Minar-e-Pakistan, Lahore, Pakistan.

During Pakistan's Mawlid, the day starts with a 31-gun salute in the federal capital and a 21-gun salute at the provincial capitals and religious hymns are sung during the day.

==== Indonesia ====
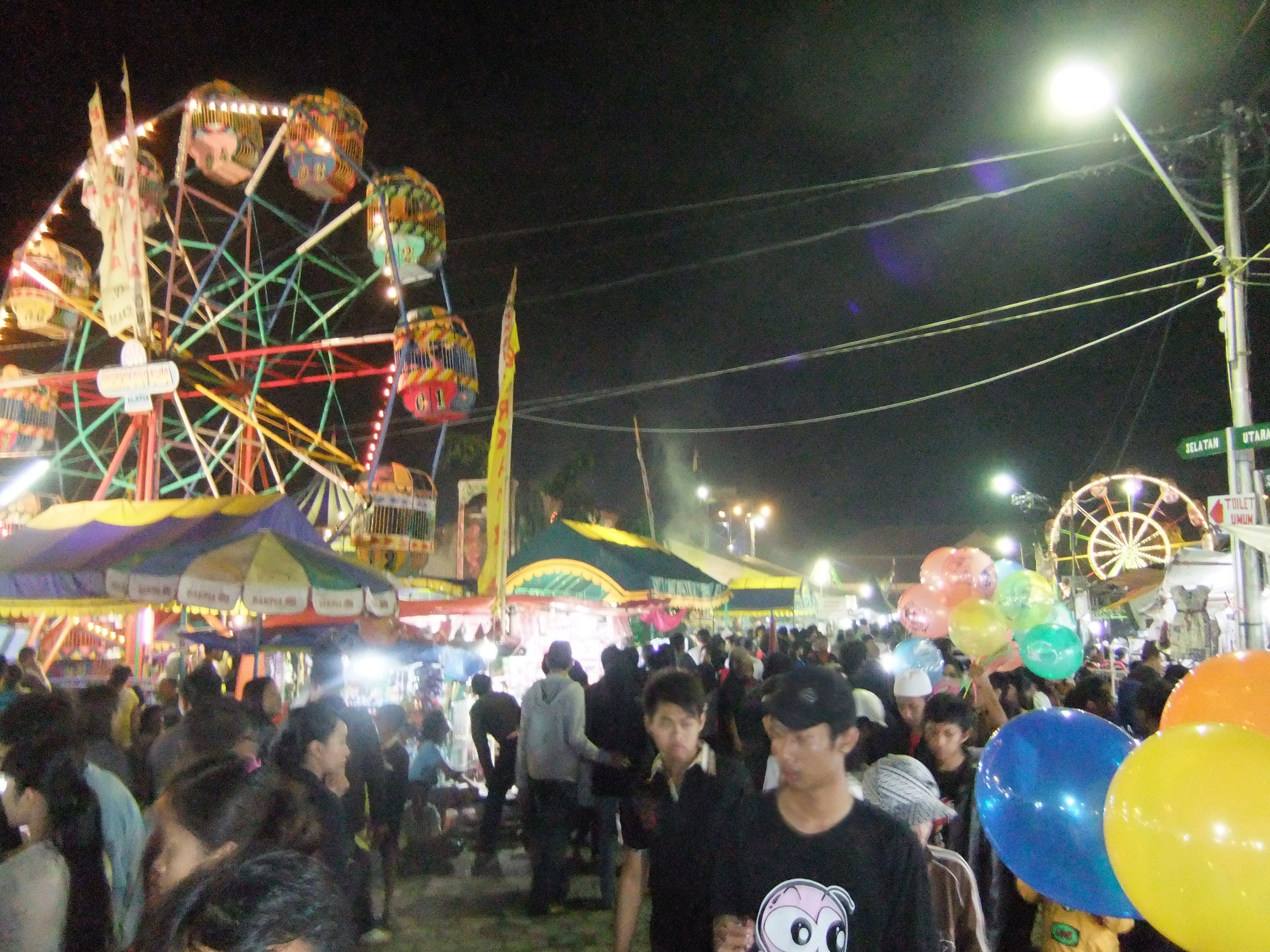
Sekaten fair in Indonesia, a week-long celebration of Mawlid.

In many parts of Indonesia, the celebration of the Mawlid al-nabi "seems to surpass in importance, liveliness, and splendour" the two official Islamic holidays of Eid ul-Fitr and Eid al-Adha.

==== Tunisia ====
In Qayrawan, Tunisia, Muslims sing and chant hymns of praise to Muhammad, welcoming him in honor of his birth. Also, generally in Tunisia, people usually prepare Assidat Zgougou to celebrate the Mawlid.

==== Turkey ====
In Turkey, Mawlid is widely celebrated. It is referred to as Mevlid Kandili in Turkish, which means "the candle feast for the Prophet's day of birth". Traditional poems regarding Muhammad's life are recited both in public mosques and at home in the evening. The most celebrated of these is the Mawlid of Süleyman Çelebi. Plenty of other mawlids were written in Ottoman times.

==== India ====
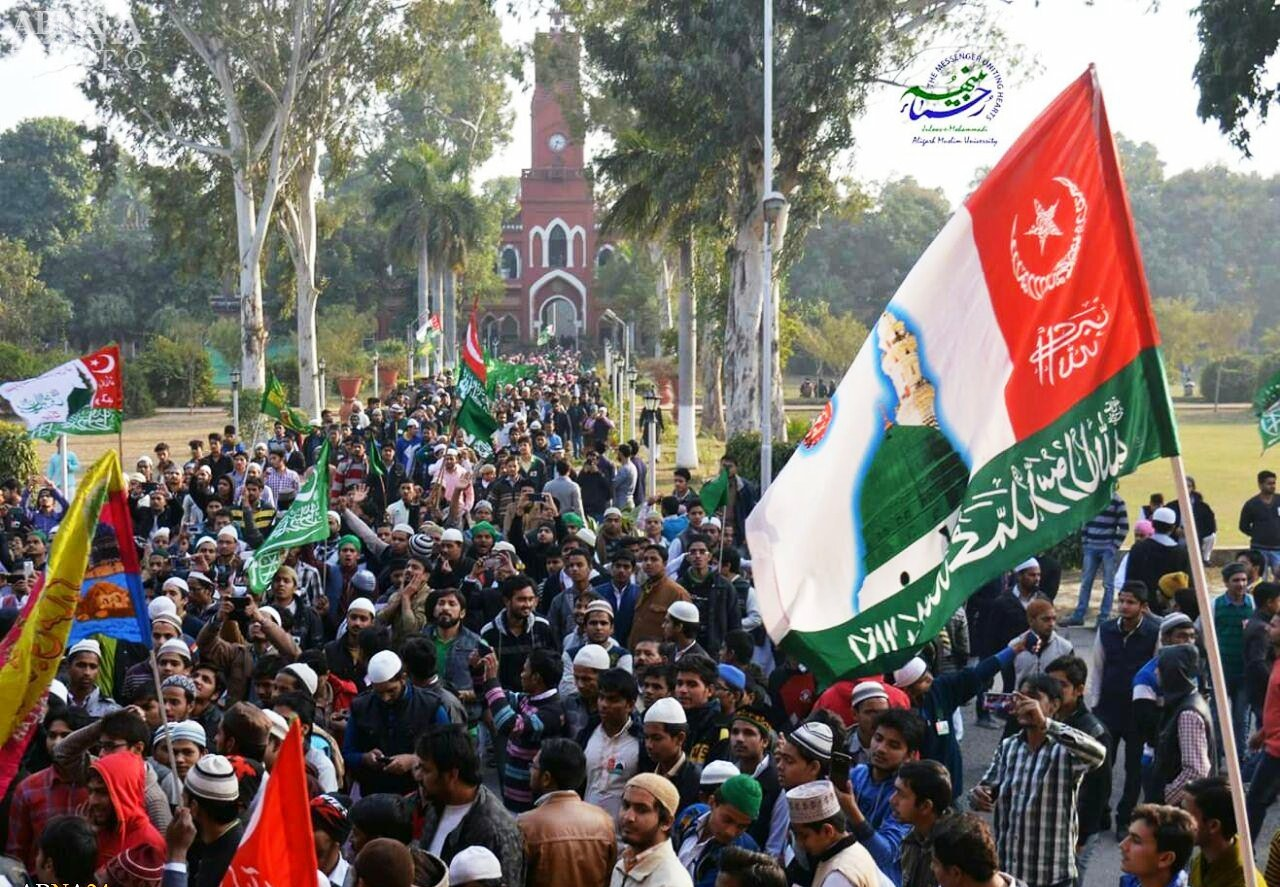
Milad/Mawlid un Nabi celebrations at Aligarh Muslim University, India

Among non-Muslim countries, India is noted for its Mawlid festivities. The relics of Muhammad are displayed after the morning prayers in the Indian state of Jammu and Kashmir at the Hazratbal Shrine, where night-long prayers are also held. Hyderabad Telangana is noted for its grand milad festivities. Religious meetings, night-long prayers, rallies, parades and decorations are made throughout the city, and schools declare holiday.

==== Morocco ====
In Morocco, Mawlid is celebrated as an official holiday. Multiple separate Sufi orders celebrate at this time. Many individual festivals are held with different forms of worship and celebration.

=== Muhammad himself ===
According to Sahih Muslim, Muhammad fasted on his own birthday, which is why some Muslims also observe that fact and fast the day.

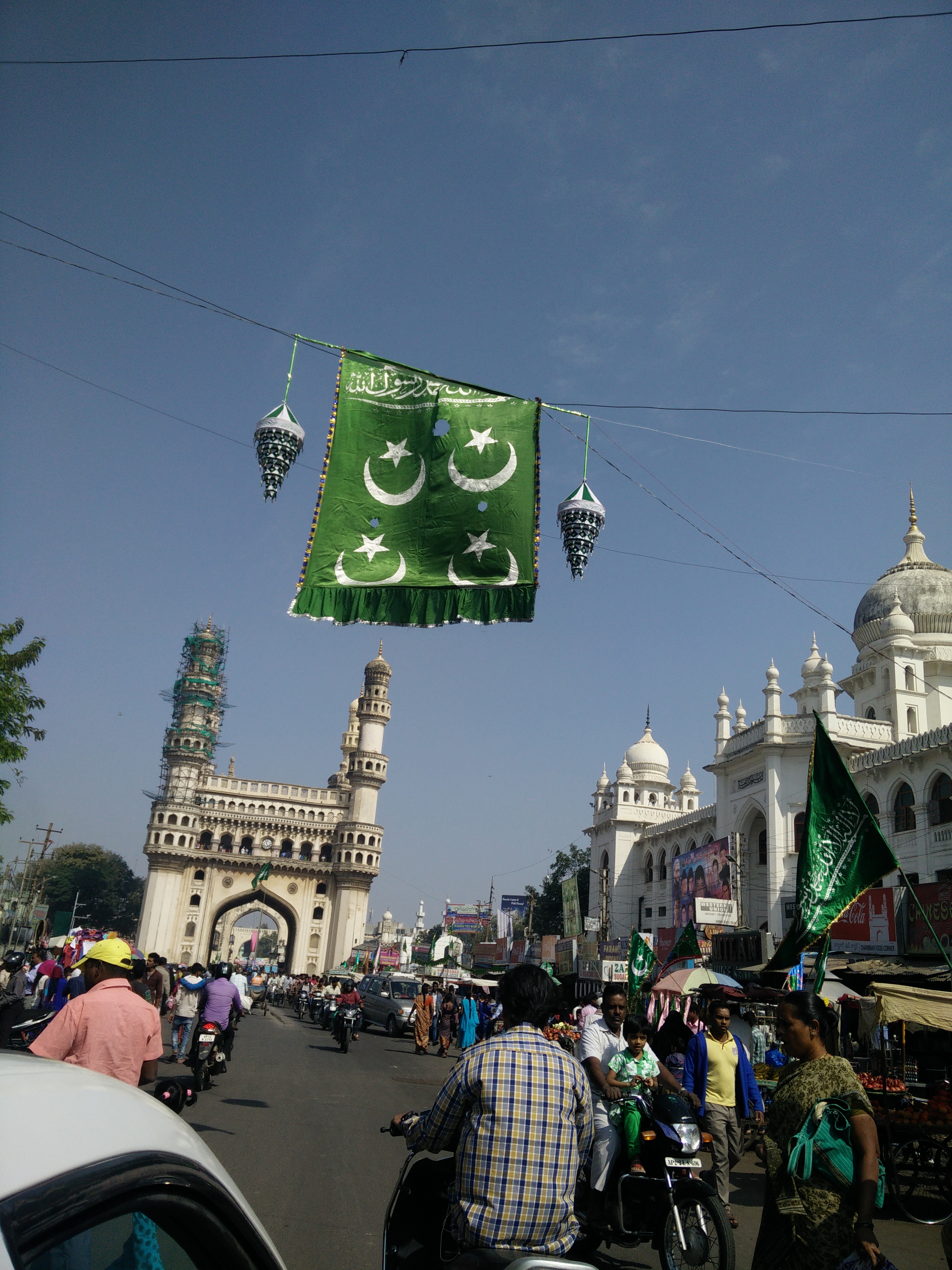
Eid Milad-un--Nabi in Hyderabad, India

== Mawlid texts ==
Along with being referred to as the celebration of the birth of Muhammad, the term Mawlid also refers to the 'text especially composed for and recited at Muhammad's nativity celebration' or "a text recited or sung on that day". Such poems have been written in many languages, including Arabic, Kurdish and Turkish. These texts contain stories of the life of Muhammad, or at least some of the following chapters from his life, briefly summarized below:

1. The Ancestors of Muhammad
2. The Conception of Muhammad
3. The Birth of Muhammad
4. Introduction of Halima
5. Life of Young Muhammad in Bedouins
6. Muhammad's orphanhood
7. Abu Talib's nephew's first caravan trip
8. Arrangement of Marriage between Muhammad and Khadija
9. Al-Isra'
10. Al-Mi'radj, or the Ascension to heaven
11. Al-Hira, first revelation
12. The first converts to Islam
13. The Hijra
14. Muhammad's death

These texts are only part of the ceremonies. There are many different ways that people celebrate Mawlid, depending on where they are from. There appears to be a cultural influence upon what kind of festivities are a part of the Mawlid celebration. In Indonesia, it is common the congregation recite Simthud Durar, especially among Arab Indonesians.

== Permissibility ==
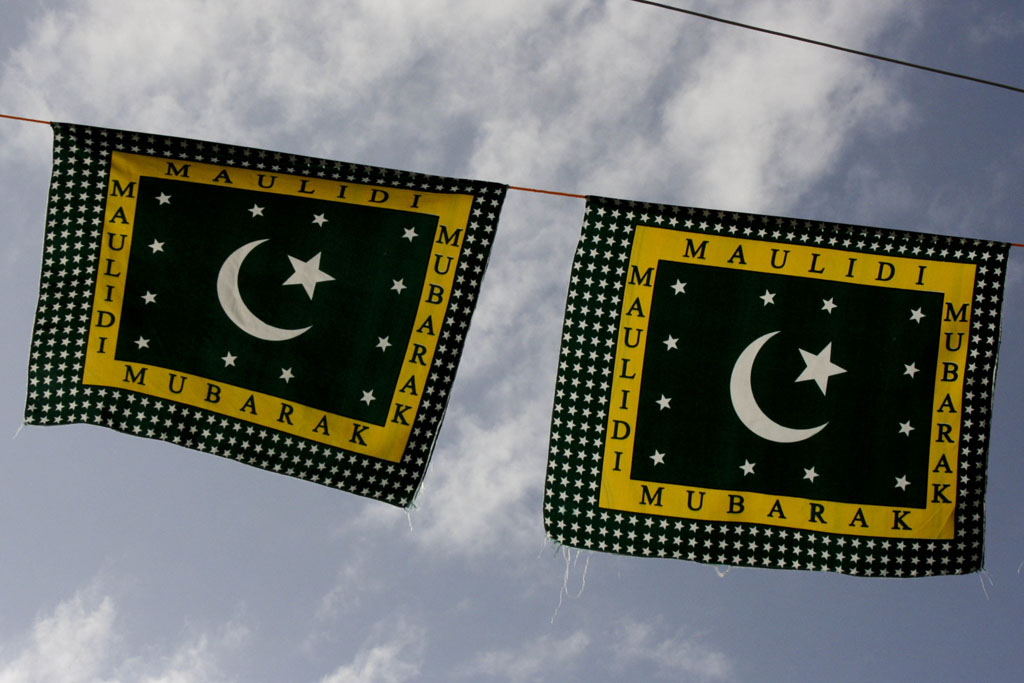
A banner with Maulid greetings in Dar es Salaam, Tanzania.

Among Muslim scholars, the legality of Mawlid "has been the subject of intense debate" and has been described as "perhaps one of the most polemical discussions in Islamic law". Traditionally, most Sunni and nearly all of the Shia scholars have approved the celebration of Mawlid, while Salafi, Wahhabi and Deobandi scholars oppose the celebration.

=== Support ===
Examples of historic Sunni scholars who permitted the Mawlid include the Shafi'i scholar Al-Suyuti (d 911 A.H.). He was a scholar who wrote a fatwa on the Mawlid, which became one of the most important texts on this issue. Although he became famous outside of Egypt, he was caught in conflicts in Egypt his entire life. For example, he believed that he was the most important scholar of his time, and that he should be regarded as a mujtahid (a scholar who independently interprets and develops the Law) and later as a mujaddid (a scholar who appears at end of a century to restore Islam). These claims made him the most controversial person of his time. However, his fatwa may have received widespread approval and may not have provoked any conflicts.

He stated that:

My answer is that the legal status of the observance of the Mawlid – as long as it just consists of a meeting together by the people, a recitation of apposite parts of the Qur'an, the recounting of transmitted accounts of the beginning of (the biography of) the Prophet – may God bless him and grant him peace – and the wonders that took place during his birth, all of which is then followed by a banquet that is served to them and from which they eat-is a good innovation (bid'a hasana), for which one is rewarded because of the esteem shown for the position of the Prophet – may God bless him and grant him peace – that is implicit in it, and because of the expression of joy and happiness on his – may God bless him and grant him peace – noble birth.

Al-Suyuti thought that the Mawlid could be based on the fact that Muhammad performed the sacrifice for his own birth after his calling to be a prophet. He said that Abu Lahab, who he called an unbeliever, had been condemned by what was revealed in the Quran but was rewarded in the fire "for the joy he showed on the night of the birth of the Prophet" by releasing from slavery Thuwayba when she had informed him of the birth of Muhammad. Therefore, he talked about what would happen to a Muslim who rejoiced in his birth and loved him.

In response to al-Fakihani, al-Suyuti said a few things. He said that "because a matter is not known it does not necessarily follow that the matter does not exist nor ever has existed." He also said that a "learned and judicious ruler introduced it," in responding to al-Fakihani's statement that "on the contrary, it is a bida that was introduced by idlers... nor the pious scholars..." Al-Suyuti also said in response to "Nor is it meritorious, because the essence of the meritorious is what the Law demands," that "the demands of meritorious are sometimes based on a text and sometimes on reasoning by analogy." Al-Suyuti said that bidas are not restricted to forbidden or reprehensible, but also to the permitted, meritorious, or compulsory categories in response to al-Fakihani's statement that "according to the consensus of the Muslims innovation in religion is not permitted." In response to al-Fakihani's statement that "This, not withstanding the fact that the month in which he… is born namely Rabi'I, is exactly the same as the one in which he died. Therefore, joy and happiness in this month are not any more appropriate than sadness in this month," al-Suyuti said that "birth is the greatest benefaction which has ever befallen us, but his death the greatest calamity that has been visited upon us." He said that the law allows the expression of gratitude for benefactions and that Muhammad had prescribed the sacrifice after the birth of a child because this would express gratitude and happiness for the newborn. Indeed, al-Suyuti said that the principles of the law say it is right to express happiness at Muhammad's birth.

The Shafi'i scholar Ibn Hajar al-Asqalani (d. 852 A.H.) too approved of the Mawlid and states that:

As for what is performed on the day of the Mawlid, one should limit oneself to what expresses thanks to God, such as the things that have already been mentioned: [Qur'anic] recitation, serving food, alms-giving, and recitation of praise [poems] about the Prophet – may God bless him and grant him peace – and asceticism which motivate people to perform good deeds and act in view of the next world.

The Damascene Shafi'i scholar Abu Shama (d. 1268) (who was a teacher of Imam al-Nawawi (d. 676 A.H.)) also supports the celebration of the Mawlid. The Maliki scholar Ibn al-Hajj (d. 737 A.H.) also spoke positively of the observance of the Mawlid in his book al-Madhkal. Al-Hajj addresses his thoughts on the paradoxical problem of misguided Mawlid observance when he says:

This is a night of exceeding virtue, and what follows from an increase in virtue is an increase in the thanks that it merits through the performance of acts of obedience and the like. [However], some people, instead of increasing thanks, have increased innovations on it.

Likewise, the Shafi'i Egyptian scholar Ibn Hajar al-Haytami (d. 974 A.H.) was an avid supporter of the Mawlid and wrote a text in praise of it. This was supported and commented on by the Egyptian scholar and former head of Al-Azhar University Ibrahim al-Bajuri and by the Hanafi Syrian Mufti Ibn Abidin. Another Hanafi Mufti Ali al-Qari (d. 1014 A.H.) too supported the celebration of the Mawlid and wrote a text on the subject as did the Moroccan Maliki scholar Muḥammad ibn Jaʿfar al-Kattānī (d. 1345 A.H.). Ibn al-Jazari (d. 833 A.H.), a Syrian Shafi'i scholar considered the celebration of the Mawlid to be a means of gaining Paradise.

In the Muslim world, the majority of Sunni Islamic scholars are in favor of the Mawlid. "In the eighteenth and nineteenth century, the celebration of the Prophet's birthday and the recitation of mawlid texts were ubiquitous practices endorsed by the majority of mainstream Sunni scholars. By the modern period the celebration of the Mawlid was overwhelmingly accepted and practiced at all levels of religious education and authority. Prominent elite scholars continued to contribute to the development of the tradition." Examples include the former Grand Mufti of Egypt Ali Gomaa, Muhammad Alawi al-Maliki, Yusuf al-Qaradawi, Habib Ali al-Jifri, Muhammad Tahir-ul-Qadri, Muhammad bin Yahya al-Ninowy, president of the Heritage and History Committee of the United Arab Emirates Muhammad ibn Ahmad al-Khazraji and Zaid Shakir, all of whom subscribe to Sunni Islam, have given their approval for the observance of Mawlid.

=== Opposition ===
Salafism, which is represented in Saudi Arabia, does not celebrate the Mawlid.

Taj al-Din al-Fakihani (d. 1331), an Egyptian Maliki, considered Mawlid to be a blameworthy innovation that was either makruh (not encouraged) or haram (forbidden). Al-Fakihani believed that there was no basis for celebration in the Qur’an (it is never referred to), nor in the Sunnah, and that there was no observance of it on authority of scholars of the umma. He said that it was a "bid`a (innovation) that was introduced by idlers, and a delight to which gluttons abandon themselves." He described it not as compulsory, meritorious, or permitted, and therefore as reprehensible or forbidden. He said that it was reprehensible when a person observed at their own expense without doing more at the gathering than to eat and abstain from doing anything sinful. The second condition of the category of forbidden, according to al-Fakihani, was when committing of transgressions entered into the practice, such as "singing–with full bellies–accompanied by instruments of idleness like drums and reed flutes, with the meeting of men with young boys and male persons with attractive women–either mixing with them or guarding them–, just like dancing by swinging and swaying, wallowing in lust and forgetting of the Day of Doom." He also said, "And likewise the women, when they come together and there lend their high voices during the reciting with sighing and singing and thereby during the declaiming and reciting disobey the law and neglect His word: ‘Verily, your Lord is on a watchtower’ (Sura 89:14)." He further said, "Nobody with civilized and courteous manners approves of this. It is only pleasing to people whose hearts are dead and do not contain few sins and offenses." Finally, he said that the month when Muhammad was born was also the month in which he died, and so implied that joy and happiness in that month are not more appropriate than sadness in that month.

Fellow Egyptian Maliki Ibn al-Haj al-Abdari also considered Mawlid as a blameworthy innovation that was either makruh or haram, who added that the celebration was never practiced by the Salaf. However, Ibn al-Haj affirms the auspicious qualities of the month of the Mawlid in the most effusive terms. and considers Muhammad's date of birth as a particularly blessed time of the year. The Maliki scholar al-Shatibi considered Mawlid an illegitimate innovation. The Andalusian jurist Abu 'Abd Allah al-Haffar (d. 1408) opposed Mawlid, noting that had the Sahaba celebrated it then its exact date would not be a matter of uncertainty. The former Grand Mufti of Saudi Arabia, Ibn Baz, along with Hammud ibn 'Abd Allah al-Tuwayjiri (d. 1992), another Saudi scholar, in their opposition also argued that there were many worthy occasions in Muhammad's life which he never commemorated, such as the revelation of the first verses of the Qur'an, the Night Journey and the hijra.

=== Mixed ===
The position of Ibn Taymiyya (1263–1328) on the Mawlid has been mixed. On the one hand, he considered that it was a reprehensible devotional innovation and criticised those who celebrated the Mawlid out of a desire to imitate the Christian celebration of Jesus's day of birth. On the other hand, he recognised that some observe Muhammad's day of birth out of a desire to show their love and reverence of him and therefore might be rewarded for their good intention, though not for the act itself, which he explicitly stated to be a forbidden (haram) innovation (bid'a). The Salafi writer Hamid al-Fiqi (d. 1959) criticised Ibn Taymiyya for holding this view and stating that "How can they receive a reward for this when they are opposing the guidance of God's Messenger (pbuh)?".

Ibn al-Hajj (c. 1250/56-1336) praised carrying out ceremonies and expressions of gratitude during the festival but rejected the forbidden and objectionable matters that took place at it. He objected to certain things, such as singers performing to the accompaniment of percussion instruments, pointing to their blameworthiness. He asked about what connections there might have been between percussion instruments and the month of Muhammad's day of birth. However, he said that it was right to honor and distinguish the day of birth because it showed respect for the month. He also said that excellence lied in devotional acts. Therefore, al-Hajj said that "the respect of this noble month should consist of additional righteous works, the giving of alms and other pious deeds. If anybody is not able to do so, let him then in any case avoid what is forbidden and reprehensible out of respect for this noble month." He said that even though the Quran might be recited, the people actually were "longing for the most skilled adepts of folly and stimulating means to entertain the people," and said that this was "perverse". Therefore, he did not condemn the Mawlid, but only "the forbidden and objectionable things which the Mawlid brings in its wake." He did not disapprove of preparing a banquet and inviting people to participate. In addition, Ibn al-Hajj also said that people observed the Mawlid not just from reasons of respect but also because they wanted to get back the silver they had given on other joyous occasions and festivals, and said that there were "evil aspects" attached to this.

Skaykh al-Islam, Abu I-Fadl ibn Hajar, who was "the (greatest) hafiz of this time," said that the legal status of the Mawlid was that it was a bida, which was not transmitted on the authority of one of the pious ancestors. However, he said that it comprised both good things, as well as the reverse, and that if one strove for good things in practicing it and evaded bad things, the Mawlid was a good innovation, and if not, then not. He said that the coming of Muhammad was a good benefaction and said that only the day ought to be observed. He said that "it is necessary that one restricts oneself to that which expresses gratitude to God… namely by reciting the Quran, the giving of a banquet, almsgiving, declamations of some songs of praise for the Prophet and some ascetic songs of praise, which stimulate the hearts to do good and to make efforts to strive for the Hereafter." He also said that the "sama and the entertainment and the like" may have been in line with the joyous nature of the day, but said that “what is forbidden or reprehensible, is, of course, prohibited. The same holds true for what is contrary to that which is regarded as the most appropriate."

Hanafi-Deobandi scholars view Mawlid as something that is permissible in essence, but may become blameworthy if corrupt rituals were involved. Ashraf Ali Thanwi, one of the most prominent Deobandi Hanafi jurists, wrote a treatise titled Tariqa Mawlid Sharif ("way of the noble Mawlid"), in which he developed a systematic argument aimed at proving that Mawlid celebrations in north India became reprehensible innovation due to the proliferation of corrupt practices. In the treatise, Thanawi emphasized that Mawlid commemorations were not only permissible but even recommended in essence. He regarded participation in Mawlid gatherings as a spiritually beneficial deed, if they were free from corrupt practices and there were no customary restraints in which participation was imposed as an obligation.

While he maintained that Mawlid celebrations are permissible in its essence and refrained from prohibiting them in absolute terms, Thanawi forbade Muslims in north India from partaking in these gatherings because of the spread of corrupt rituals and the prevalence of the notion that participation is obligatory. Thanawi wrote:

"What must be ascertained is whether such permissible actions are producing harm in our time: if one finds harm being generated, then these acts must be forbidden. Otherwise, they will remain permitted. And this ascertainment can be easily derived through observation and experience. So in the case of the mawlid, through my years of experience with this matter, I can unhesitatingly declare that nearly everyone among the masses considers this ceremony as legally obligated and partakes in its festivities as if it were equal to or even higher in stature than the obligations of the sharī‘a."

The practice is still common among Deobandis in India, and the Jamiat Ulema-e-Hind, scholars wing of Deobandism celebrate Mawlid in Kanpur city of Uttar Pradesh, India by bringing out procession since 1913 and also takes part in Mawlid celebrations in Aligarh Muslim University which is organized ever year under Seerat Committee. One of the Deobandi scholar who regularly delivers mawlid speeches in Aligarh Muslim University, India Prof. Qasmi (Dean, Faculty of Theology, AMU) told that Eid-e-Milad-un-Nabi functions have been organized at MAO College/Aligarh Muslim University (AMU) since the times of its founder.

== Other uses ==
In some countries, such as Egypt and Sudan, Mawlid is used as a generic term for the celebration of the day of birth of local Sufi saints and not only restricted to the observance of the birth of Muhammad. Around 3,000 Mawlid celebrations are held each year. These festivals attract an international audience, with the largest one in Egypt attracting up to three million people honouring Ahmad al-Badawi, a local 13th-century Sufi saint.

== Gallery ==
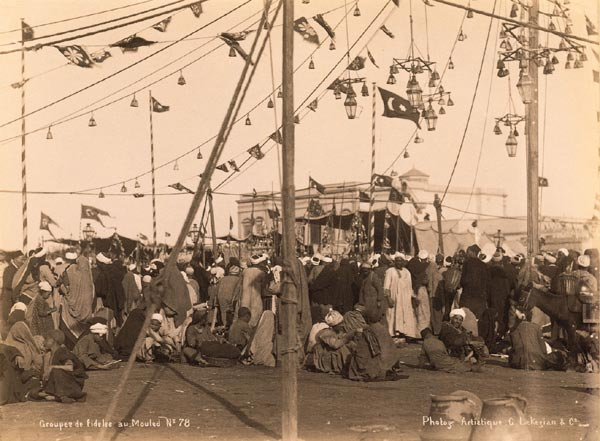
Mawlid an-Nabawi celebrations in Cairo in 1878

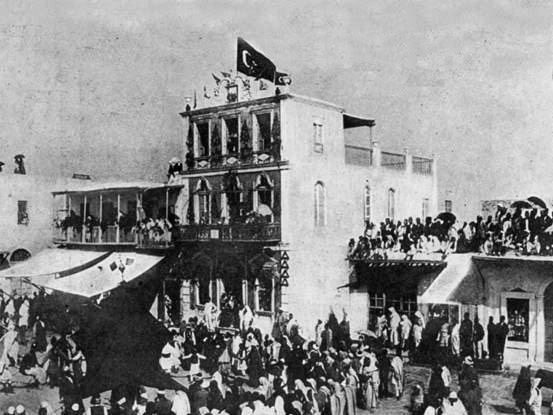
The Ottoman flag is raised during Mawlid an-Nabi celebration of Mohammad's day of birth in 1896 in the field of municipal Libyan city of Benghazi

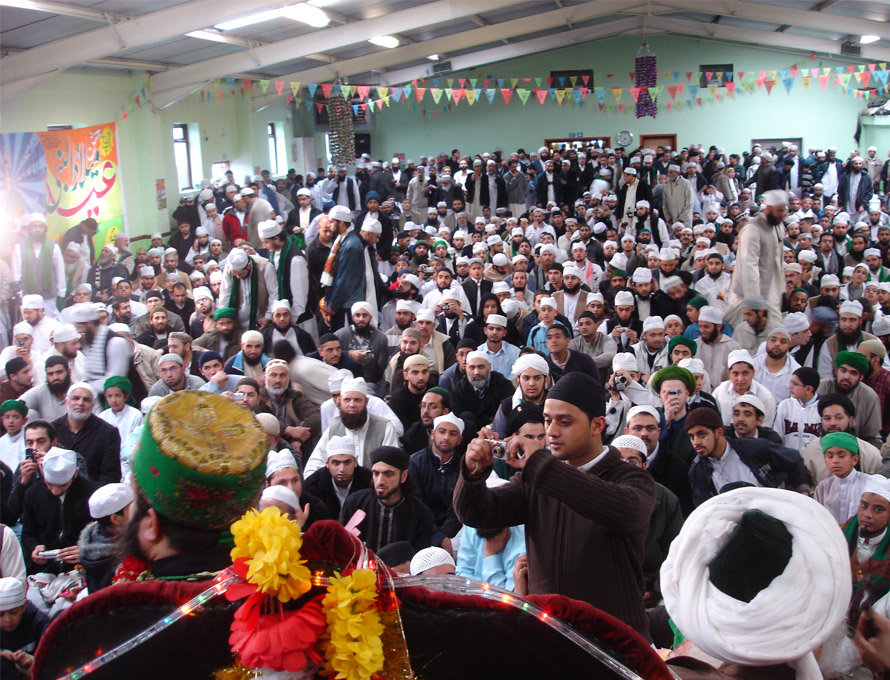
Mawlid celebration in 2007 in India

== See also ==
- Bayt al-Mawlid, the house where Muhammad is believed to have been born
- Durood
- Hamd
- Haḍra
- Madih nabawi
- Mawsim
- Mehfil
- Na'at
- Mawlid al-Barzanjī
- Islamic poetry
- Mid-Sha'ban
- Tweeza
- Ya Muhammad
