= Kandil =

Five Islamic holy nights and festival

Kandil (from Arabic: قنديل, romanized: qindīl) refers to five Islamic holy nights, celebrated in Ottoman and Muslim Balkan communities, related to the life of the Islamic prophet Muhammad, when the minarets are illuminated and special prayers are made. It is a tradition dated back to the Ottoman Sultan Selim II of the 16th century, who with the support of the Shaykh al-Islām "Chief Jurisconsult" of the time, thought it was appropriate to light up the minarets on mosques for these blessed occasions.

Kandil is derived from Arabic qindīl "chandelier, candelabra", and refers to an oil lamp. Kandil nights play a less significant role than the Bayram festivals.

In Turkey, Kandil simidi, a special smaller form of simit is commonly sold on Kandil days.

== The five Kandil nights ==
- Mevlid Kandili (Mawlid): The birth of Muhammad,
- Regaip Kandili (Laylat al-Raghaib): God's mercy, donations and aid are distributed on this night,
- Miraç Kandili (Isra' and Mi'raj): Muhammad's ascent to heaven,
- Berat Kandili (Mid-Sha'ban): Forgiveness of sins and determining of destiny for the next year,
- Kadir Gecesi (Night of Power): First revelation of the Quran to Muhammad.
