= Safar =

Second month of the Islamic calendar

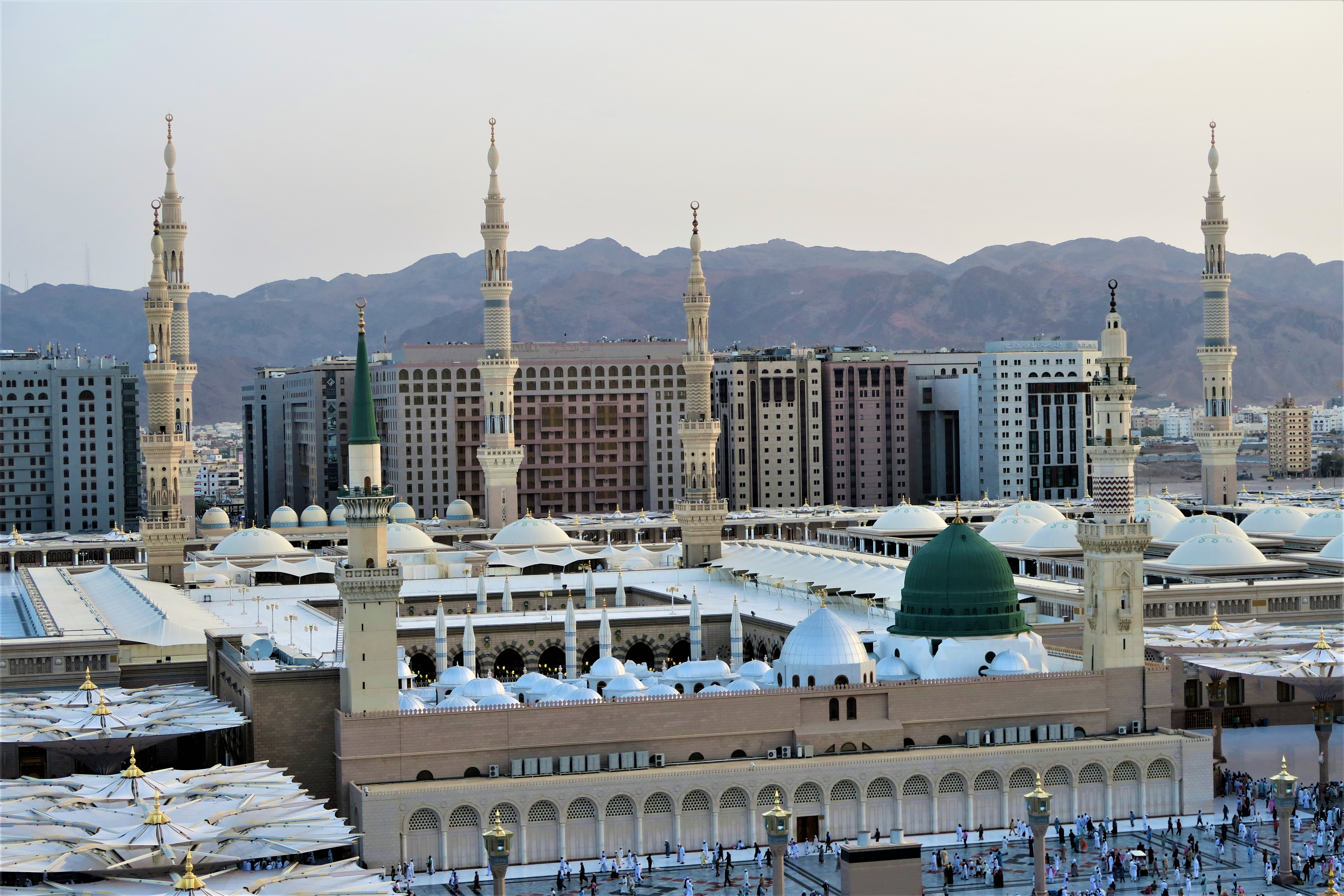
- Medina, the city to which Muhammad migrated from Mecca (see Hijrah)
- Native name: صَفَر (Arabic)
- Calendar: Islamic calendar
- Month number: 2
- Number of days: 29 or 30 (depends on actual observation of the moon's crescent)
- Significant days: Hijrah

Safar (Arabic: صَفَر, romanized: Ṣafar), also spelt as Safer in Turkish, is the second month of the lunar Islamic calendar.

Most of the Islamic months were named according to ancient Sabean/Sabaic weather conditions; however, since the calendar is lunar, the months shift by about 11 days every solar year, meaning that these conditions do not necessarily correspond to the name of the month.

== Timing ==
The Islamic calendar is a purely lunar calendar, and its months begin when the first crescent of a new moon is sighted. Since the Islamic lunar year is 11 to 12 days shorter than the solar year, Safar migrates throughout the seasons. The estimated start and end dates for Safar are as follows (based on the Umm al-Qura calendar of Saudi Arabia):

Safar dates between 2024 and 2028
AH	First day (CE/AD)	Last day (CE/AD)
1446	5 August 2024	3 September 2024
1447	26 July 2025	23 August 2025
1448	15 July 2026	13 August 2026
1449	5 July 2027	2 August 2027
1450	24 June 2028	22 July 2028

== Islamic events ==
- 01 Safar 61 AH, prisoners of Karbalā entered Yazid's Palace in Syria
- 10 Safar 117 AH, death of Sakina bint Husayn, youngest daughter of Hussain ibn Ali and a prisoner of Karbalā
- 17 Safar 202 AH, martyrdom of Ali al-Ridha according to one tradition
- 18 Safar, Grand Magal pilgrimage is celebrated at Touba, Senegal, commemorating the departure of Cheikh Ahmadou Bamba
- 18, 19 and 20 Safar, Death Anniversary (urs) of Ali Hajveri is celebrated at Data Darbar, Lahore
- Every 20 or 21 Safar, Arba'een or Chehlum (the 40th day after Ashura)
- 27 Safar 1 AH, Migration was started (Hijrah) from Mecca to Medina by Muhammad with Abu Bakr
- 27 Safar 589 AH, death of Salahuddin al-Ayyubi
- 28 Safar 11 AH, Akhiri Chahar Shambah
- 28 Safar 50 AH, Martyrdom of Imam Hasan ibn ‘Alī, grandson of Muhammad
