= Laylat al-Raghaib =

Holy night in Islam

Laylat al-Raghaib (Arabic: لَيْلَةُ الرّغائِب, lit. 'Night of Wishes'; Turkish: Regaip Kandili) is a night of prayer in Islamic practice, classed in Turkish tradition as one of the five blessed Kandil nights. Observance of this night differs among Muslims in the world. It is mostly practiced by Muslims influenced by Sufism, such as Muslims in Turkey and Muslim Balkan communities today, and Shia Muslims, while Sunnis in the Arab world pays little attention (although it originated in the Levant), and Wahhabis and Salafis dismiss it entirely. Views on the permissibility of observing it also differ among Muslim scholars, and have been the subject of repeated debates over the past millennium. The practice has variously been rejected as bid'ah (unacceptable innovation) by the four major Sunni Madhhab, Shafi’i, Hanbali, Hanafi, and Maliki jurists, or defended as bid'ah hasanah (meritorious innovation).

Laylat al-Raghaib marks the beginning of the "Three holy months" (Rajab, Sha'ban and leading to Ramadan) in the Hijri calendar. As Islamic holidays begin the night before, Laylat al-Raghaib is celebrated on the Thursday night preceding the first Friday of the month of Rajab. Followers of this tradition believe that if, on the first Thursday of Rajab, they recite a special set of prayers, they will be rewarded by the fulfillment of their wishes.

Raghaib is derived from the root of the verb word "ra-gha-ba" (Arabic: رَغَبَ) meaning "to desire" or "to tend toward".

== History ==
According to Abu Bakr al-Turtushi (1059 – 1126 CE), the custom of Raghaib prayer goes back to the late 11th century in Jerusalem. The practise was founded by a hadith with a weak chain of narration, and considered a forgery attributed to Abu'l-Hasan Ali ibn Abd Allah ibn Jahdam (d. 1023) by Ibn al-Jawzi. The hadith states:

It is most important, however, that none of you should neglect the first Thursday night in Rajab, for it is the night that the angels call the Night of Wishes. This is because, by the time the first third of the night has elapsed, there will not be a single angel still at large in the heavens, nor in any region of the earth bar one. They will all be gathered together in the Ka'ba and the area immediately surrounding it. Allah will condescend to notice that they have assembled there, and He will say: 'My angels, ask Me for whatever you wish!' Their response to this will be: 'Our Lord, the request we wish to make is that You grant forgiveness to those who faithfully keep the fast in Rajab,' whereupon Allah will tell them: 'That I have already done!'

The celebration of Laylat al-Ragahaib enjoyed great popularity in the 13th century and mosques "brightly lit" on that night. In the same century, the practise was attacked on the basis of a lack of evidence that Muhammad himself ever performed or approved of it. Hadiths regarding that practise have been classified as weak (ḍaʻīf). Hence a debate on the Raghaib prayers took place in Damascus between the two Shafi'i scholars ʿIzz ad-Dīn Ibn ʿAbd as-Salām (d. 1262) and Ibn al-Salah (d. 1245). Both declared the practice to be a bid'ah (innovation), due to a lack of support from hadith. ʿIzz ad-Dīn branded this custom as unacceptable innovation, while Ibn as-Salāh deemed it bid'ah hasanah (meritorious innovation) as, despite lacking a basis in Prophetic tradition, it encouraged praying. Since the majority of his contemporary scholars agreed with ʿIzz ad-Dīn, the Ayyubid Sultan al-Malik al-Kamil forbade the performance of Raghaib prayer in the mosques in 1235. Due to the popularity of that custom, however, the sultanate ultimately had to permit it again a few years later.

The 15th-century Ottoman scholar Shams al-Din al-Fanari (d. 1430) wrote a treatise defending Raghaib customs. Also, in the Ottoman Empire, the notion spread that on that night Amina bint Wahb, the Prophet's mother, realized that she was about to give birth to a Prophet. Furthermore, before 1588 it became a common custom to light up the minarets on Raghaib night. During the 17th century, the Kadizadeli movement in the Ottoman Empire controversially challenged the permissibility of observing Ragha'ib, as part of their broader anti-innovation ideology; their responses ranged from walking out of the prayer in protest to (in Bursa in 1703) physically attacking the congregation, although by that time Anatolian Muslims widely viewed these prayers as part of canonical Islamic worship. The opponents of the Kadizadelis, on the other hand insisted that these prayers were too deeply rooted in local custom to be banned, and that they attracted people to a life of piety.

From the 18th century, special poems of praise to the Prophet were written for Raghaib night, which were recited with musical accompaniment. These praise poems were called Regaibiyye. The best-known Regaibiyye was the Masnawī Matlau'l-fecr written by Selahaddin Uşşakī (d. 1783).

== In religious tradition ==
It is believed, the name of the night was given by the angels. Accordingly, when one third of that night has passed, no angel remains in heaven or on the earth, they all gather around the Kaaba. At that moment, God spoke to them and asked them what they want. The angels answered, they wish that God forgives whose who fast on Raghaib. Whereupon God grands the wish. When one third of the first night of Rajab passed, the angels ask for forgiveness for those who fast on the month of Raghaib.

=== Practice ===
The night is celebrated by fasting the Thursday (or the Friday on the subsequent day) before The Night of Wishes. At Night, prayers are performed and candles are lit in mosques.

Specific prayers are performed: In each rak'ah, after al-Fatiha, al-Qadr will be read three times and Ikhlas will be read twelve times. Alternatively surah al-Qadr is read once and surah "Ikhlas" three times. It is believed that during this night, sincere hopes and requests are fulfilled.

After the prayers have been completed, one can then recite the following seventy times:

Arabic: اللهم صلّ على سيدنا محمد النبي الأمي وعلى آله وصحبه وسلم, romanized: Allahumme salli alâ seyyidinâ Muhammedinin nebiyyil ümmiyyi ve alâ âlihi ve sahbihi ve sellim, Turkish: Allah’ım, ümmî nebî Efendimiz Muhammed’e, âline ve ashâbına salât u selâm eyle!

It is recommended to recite the Qur'an on Laylat al-Raghaib. It is further recommended to repent (Tawba) and asking for forgiveness. Performing dua, and remembering to stay in praise and gratitude for the blessings given by God. God is said to send salawat (greetings) on Muhammad. Another recommended practice is almsgiving (Zakat) in the way of God, and it would transfer the owner of charity to the love of God.

In Turkey, this and other Kandil nights were traditionally marked by cooking lokma and baking a small round loaf.
