= Kandil simidi =

Salty variant of the Turkish simit

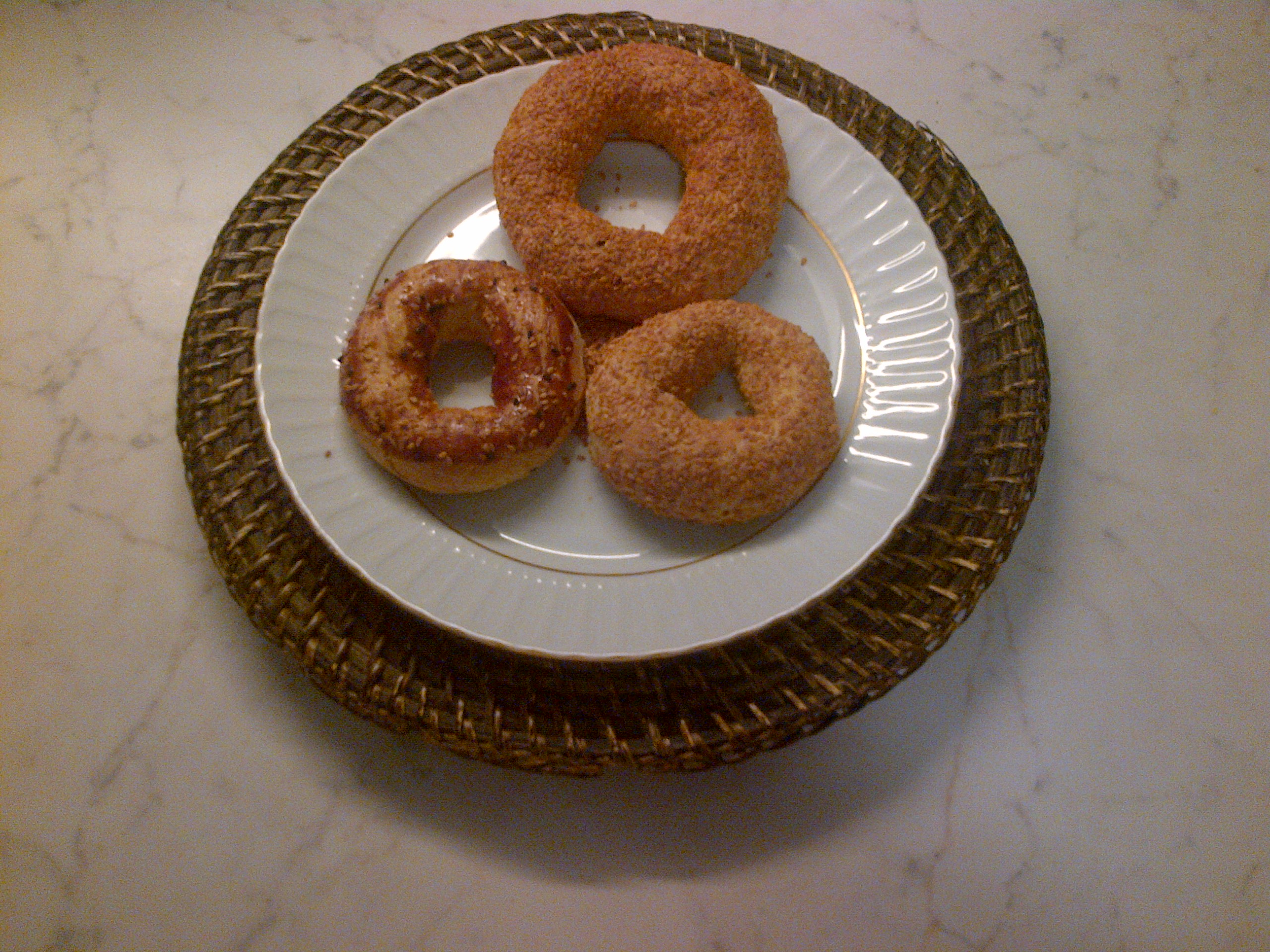
- Kandil simidi
- Type: Bread
- Main ingredients: sesame seeds

Kandil simidi is a smaller and salty variant of the Turkish simit pastry which is eaten during the Kandil religious holiday. It is ring-shaped and coated in sesame seeds, and is sometimes flavoured with mahlep. During the five nights of Kandil, these pastries are baked and offered to neighbours and relatives.

== See also ==
- Bagel
- Bublik
- Ka'ak
- List of pastries
