= Mid-Sha'ban =

Islamic holiday

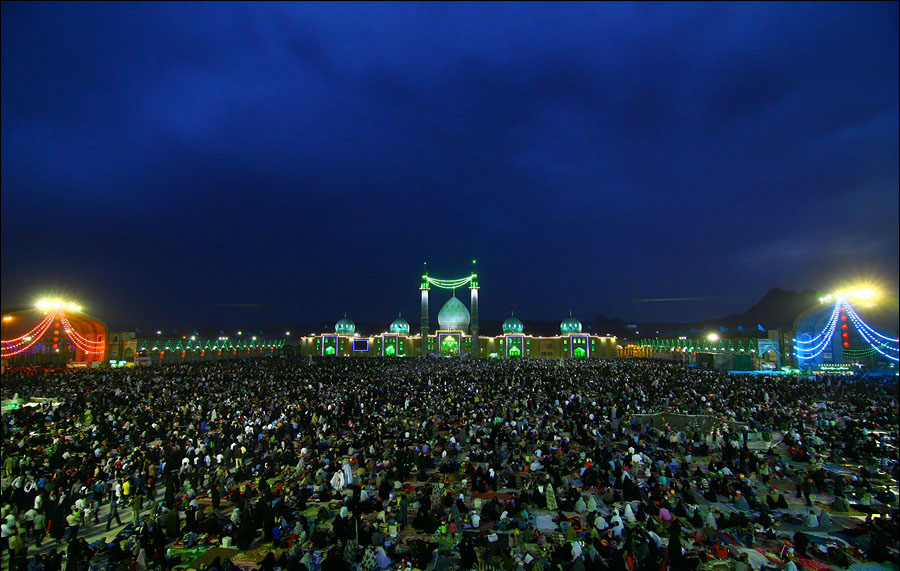
- Mid-Sha'ban celebration at Jamkaran Mosque in Qom, Iran
- Observed by: Muslims
- Type: Islamic
- Observances: Prayers for forgiveness
- Date: Eve of 15th of Sha'ban (after sunset on the 14th)

Mid-Sha'ban (Arabic: نصف شعبان, romanized: niṣf šaʿbān or ليلة نصف مِن شعبان laylat niṣf min šaʿbān "night on the half of Sha'ban") is an Islamic holiday observed by Shia and Sunni Muslims on the eve of 15th of Sha'ban (the night following the sunset on the 14th day of the eighth month of the Islamic calendar). In Twelver Shia Islam, it is particularly significant as the birthday of Muhammad al-Mahdi, the twelfth Imam, traditionally believed to have been born on 15 Sha'ban 255 AH (868 CE). The night is marked by prayers, supplications, charity, and religious gatherings. Some communities also celebrate a similar holiday on this night called Shab-e-barat (lit. 'Barat Night') or Laylat al-Bara’ah (Arabic: ليلة البراءة). It is celebrated in many South Asian, Central Asian, Southeast Asian and West Asian countries.

== Overview ==
Muslims observe Mid-Sha'ban as a night of worship and salvation. In fact, both Sunni and Shia Muslims recognise this night as the Night of Forgiveness. It is regarded as a night in which the fortunes of individuals for the coming year are decided and Allah may forgive sinners. In many regions, this is also a night in which prayers are arranged for forgiveness from Allah for one's deceased ancestors. Additionally, Twelver Shia Muslims commemorate the birthday of Muhammad al-Mahdi on this date.

Imam Ja'far al-Sadiq and Imam Muhammad al-Baqir used to perform special prayers on this night. Scholars such as Imam Shafii, Imam Nawawi, Imam Ghazzali, and Imam Suyuti have declared praying acceptable on the night of mid-Shaban.

== Etymology ==
The 15th of Sha'ban goes by several names, depending on the country in which it is observed. Most can be categorised into two general meanings:

- Mid-Sha'ban or Half of Sha'ban. Named after the day's chronological position in the eighth month of the Islamic calendar:
  - Nisf(u) Sha'ban (Arabic: نصف شعبان),
  - Nisfu Syaaban (Malay: نصف شعبان)
  - Nime-ye Sha'ban (Persian: نيمه‌ی شعبان)
  - Sha'ban yarisi (Azerbaijani: شعبان یارێسی)
- Bara'at Night. Bara'at is an Arabic noun which is roughly translated to English as either innocence, records, assignment, deliverance or salvation.
  - Laylat al-Bara'ah (Arabic: ليلة البراءة)
  - Berat Kandili (Turkish: Berâet Kandili)
  - Shab-e Baraat (Persian/Urdu: شبِ براة, Hindi: शब-ए-बरात, Bengali: শবে বরাত): (transl. "the night of freedom") because Allah frees those who are destined for Hell. Shab-e-Barat is also known as the "Night of Forgiveness" or "Day of Atonement".
  - Barat Gejesi (Azerbaijani: برات گئجه‌سی)

== Origins ==
The base for celebrating Mid-Sha'ban is not without dispute. Whether or not 15 Sha'ban is regarded as a special holiday, has primarily been an issue of interpreting the Quran and classifying the Hadith.

=== Qur'an ===
Although not mentioned directly in the Qur'an, two verses are sometimes ascribed to Mid-Sha‘ban:

"Indeed, We sent it down during a blessed night. Indeed, We were to warn [mankind]. On that night is made distinct every precise matter-"^{[Quran 44:3–4]}

According to Tafsir Ibn Kathir, the more correct interpretation of this blessed night been attributed to another Islamic holy night, Laylat al-Qadr, based on additional verses.

=== Hadith ===
In some hadiths of Ṣihah Sittah, this Hadith is described as the specialty of the night. Also in the other Hadith texts mention the specialty of this night. There are different standards of the hadiths and disagreements in this regard. The term "night of mid-Sha'ban", which is used in the hadeeth of the Hadith, is "Nisf Sha'ban" or "laylatun nisfi min Sha'ban (ليلةٌ نصفِ مِن شعبان)". It has been said in a Hadith,

The Prophet (peace and blessings of Allah be upon him) said that Allah has manifested on the night of mid-Shaban and forgiveness of all His creation except the polytheists and the envious.

— - (Ibnu Majah, As-Sunan 1/445; Bazzar, Al-Musnad 1/157, 207, 7/186; Ahmad Ibn Hanbal, al-Musnad 2/176; Ibn Abi Asim, As-Sunnah, pp. 223–224 Ibn Hibban, as-Sahih 12/481; Taabrani, al-Muzam al-Kabbir, 20/108, 22–233; Al-Mujam al-Aausat, 7/68; Baihaqi, Shu'abul Iman, 3/381; Ibnu Khuzaymah, Kitabut Tawhid 1 / 325-226, Mishkat Al Masabih 1306) [Classified as Daeef/Weak by Albani]

Another Hadith says,

Ayesha (R) said, one night I did not find the Prophet (ṣalla'llahu 'alayhi wa-sallam), and I went out to seek him. I noticed that he was in Jannatu 'l-Bāqi, lifting his head towards the sky. He said, "O Aisha! Do you fear that Allah and His Messenger will do injustice to you?" Ayesha (R) said, "No, but rather I thought that you might have gone to your wife. He said that Allah Almighty descended on the earth in the middle of the night of Sha'ban and forgave the sins of more people than the wool of the sheep of the people of Kalb tribe. (Ibn Majah, As-Sunan 1/444, Hadith No. 1388). Ibnu Abi Sabrah, the only narrator of this hadith. Ahmad, Imam Bukhari and other Muhaddiths accused him of being liars.

— (Ibn Hajar, Taqribut Tahzib, page 63; Tahizibut Taazib, 12 / 25–26.), [Daif/Weak, or Maudu/fabricated narrator chain]

According to different Sahih Hadith, Muhammad used to perform fasting in this month. The fast of mid-Sha'ban was the most loved of him. He used to perform fasting in the month of Ramadan, from the first to the 15th of the month. When asked about this, he said,

"This month man's actions are being raised to the Lord Almighty. And I love that my work would be raised during my fasting."

— - (Nasa'i, As-Sunan 4/201; Albani, Sahihhut Taragib 1/24. [Hassan or better narrator chain]

Scholars like Imam Shafi, Imam Nawawi, Imam Ghazali, and Imam Suyuti have declared praying acceptable on the night of mid-Shaban. In his majmu (a comprehensive compendium of legal rulings), Imam Nawawi quoted from Imam Shafi's Kitab al-Umm (his seminal work on jurisprudence), that there are five nights when dua (prayer) is answered, one of them being the night of the 15th of Sha'ban. However, many Islamic scholars also consider Shab-e-Barat to be a bid'ah (innovation), and hence discourage observing it.

Muslims believe that on the night of Shab-e-Barat, God writes the destinies of all men and women for the coming year by taking into account the deeds they committed in the past. It is regarded as one of the holiest nights on the Islamic calendar.

=== Birthday of Muhammad al-Mahdi ===
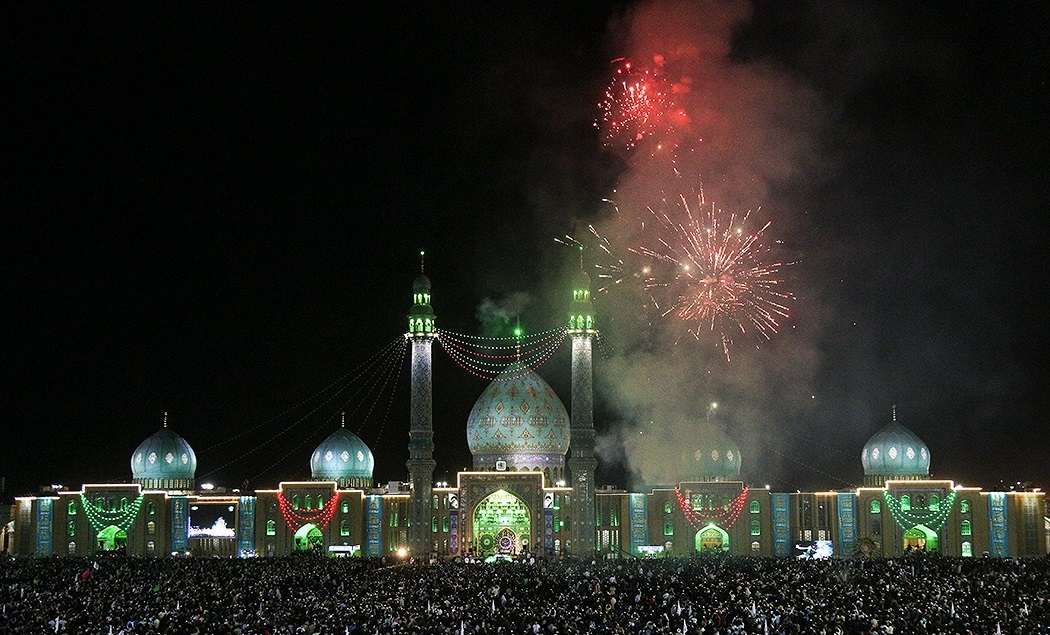
the celebration of Birthday of Muhammad al-Mahdi Jamkaran Mosque, Qom.

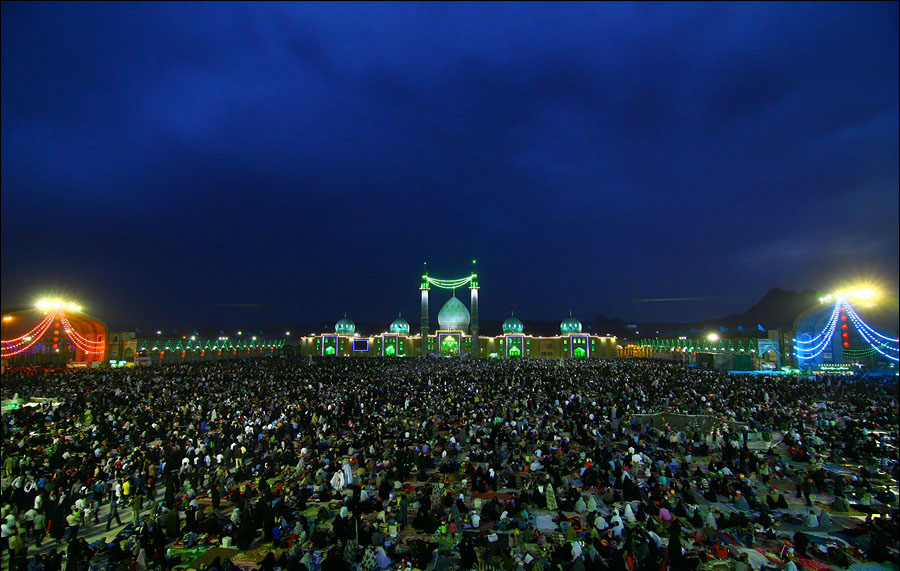
Mid-Sha'ban at the Jamkaran Mosque, Qom.

According to Twelver Shias, Muhammad al-Mahdi, the final Shia Imām, was born on 15 Sha'ban. Shi'as celebrate Muhammad al-Mahdi's birthday on that day and perform religious acts such as prayers for the reappearance of Muhammad al-Mahdi, fasting, and worship. Iranian cities are decorated on the night of Mid-Sha'ban.

== Gregorian dates ==
Although the date of Mid-Sha'ban is always the same in the Islamic calendar, the date in the Gregorian calendar falls approximately 11 days earlier each successive year, since the Islamic calendar is lunar and the Gregorian calendar is solar. Hence if date falls in the first ten days of a Gregorian calendar year, there will be a second occurrence in the last ten days of the same Gregorian calendar year.

Upcoming predicted dates of Mid-Sha'ban
Islamic year	Umm al-Qura predicted
1442	29 March 2021
1443	19 March 2022
1444	8 March 2023
1445	25 February 2024
1446	14 February 2025
1447	4 February 2026

== Observance ==
Shab-e-Barat is considered a major event in South Asia and Southeast Asia, during which Muslims gather to worship and seek forgiveness for their wrongdoings. It is believed to reward them with fortune for the whole year and cleanse them of their sins. In many regions, it is also a night when prayers are offered to forgive one's deceased ancestors. Additionally, Twelver Shia Muslims commemorate the birthday of Muhammad al-Mahdi. Imam Ja'far al-Sadiq and Imam Muhammad al-Baqir perform special prayers on this night.

To pray for the dead and ask Allah for the forgiveness of the dead is a common ceremony in all cities that hold Barat ceremonies. According to a hadith tradition, the prophet Muhammad went into the graveyard of Baqi on this night, where he prayed for the Muslims buried there. On this basis, some clerics deem it advisable on this night to go to the graveyard of the Muslims to recite a part of the Qur'an and pray for the dead.

== Holiday customs ==
Mid-Sha'ban is celebrated in countries including India, Bangladesh, Pakistan, Sri Lanka, Lebanon, Iran, Azerbaijan, Turkey, Afghanistan, Uzbekistan, Tajikistan, Kazakhstan, Turkmenistan and Kyrgyzstan. In the Arab world the festival is celebrated by Arabs with Sufi heritage, as well as by Shias. The Salafi Arabs do not celebrate this holiday.

In South Asia, Muslims make sweets (especially Halwa or Zarda) to be given to the neighbors and the poor on the evening prior to the 15th of Sha'ban. In Iraq, children are given candies as they walk around their neighborhoods. This custom of distributing Halva is also practiced in Bosnia on the 15th night of Sha'ban, as well as on three other holidays: Laylat al-Qadr, Laylat al-Mi'raj and Laylat al-Raghaib.

Some Muslims in Indonesia, mostly in Aceh, West Sumatra and South Kalimantan, perform a communal zikr in mosques, followed by a lecture (ceramah) led by an ustad (otherwise known in Java and Madura as a kyai).

Sunni Muslims in Iraqi Kurdistan and Afghanistan celebrate this holiday 15 days before Ramadan.

=== West Asia ===
==== Iran ====
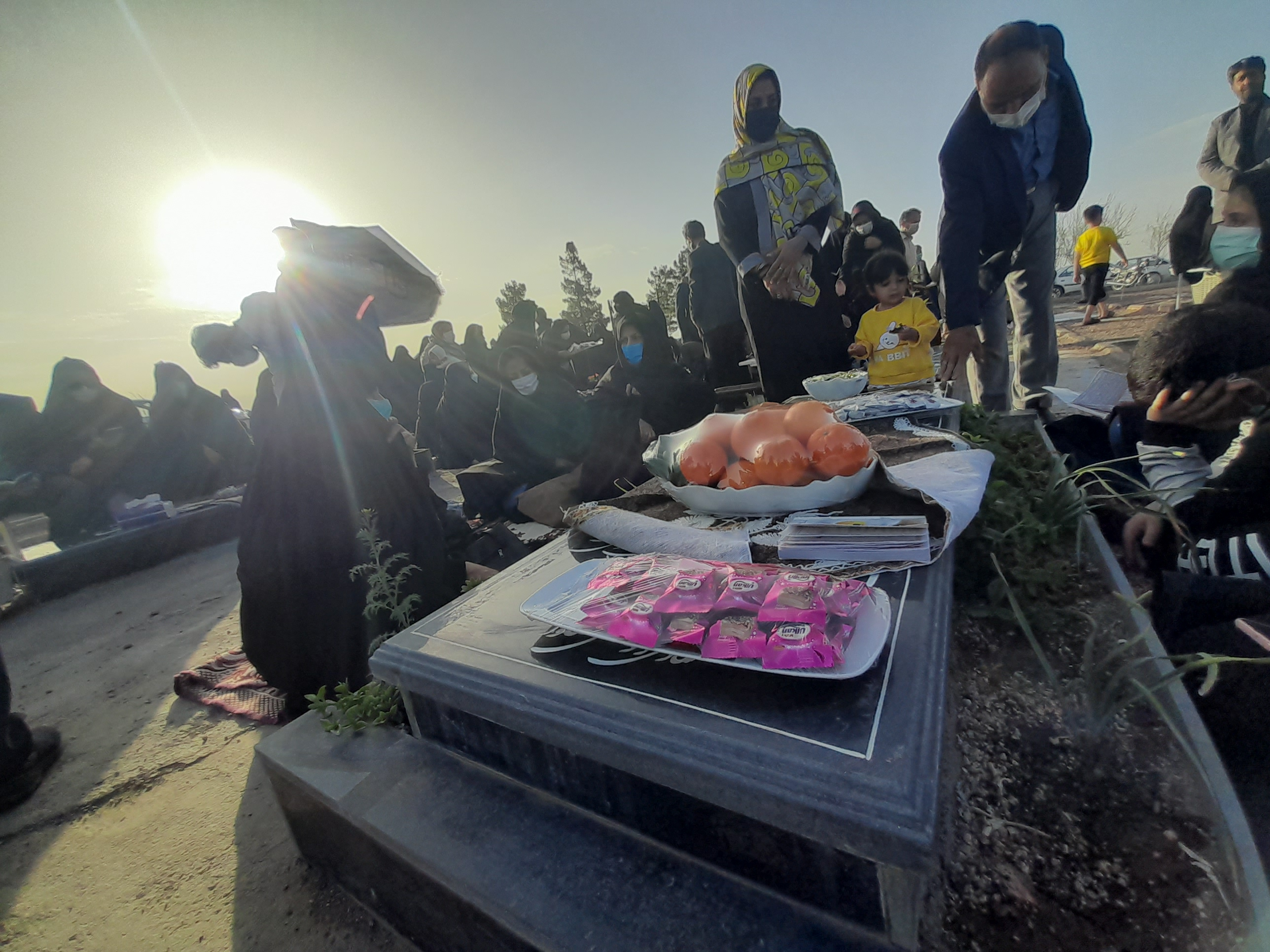
Shab E Braat in Iran

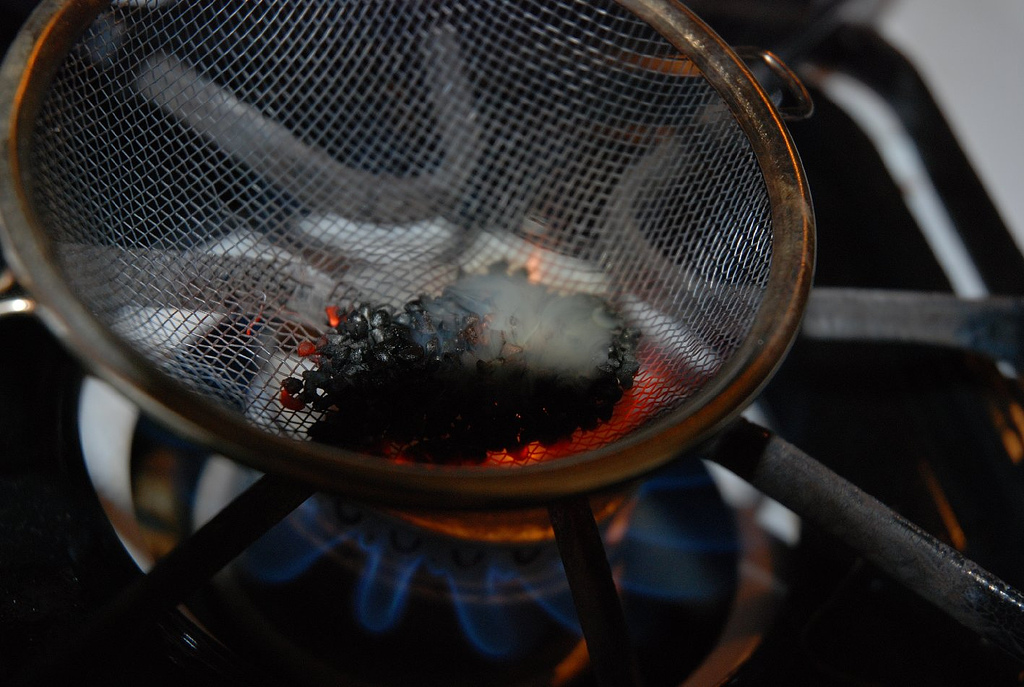
Peganum harmala incense

The Barat festival in the Khorasan region, Kurdistan, and other parts of Iran, is one of the most important festivals for respecting the souls of the dead. People in every area have their own customs, but the common tradition is to prepare sweets and candy with dates (halva) and date palm. Before sunset groups gather in cemeteries to clean the tombs to place offerings of sweets and candy pot on the tombs for the departed to eat, to pray, and to light candles to turn on the lights (cherag). In some Iranian cities, to celebrate this festival people gather in the cemeteries to burn Peganum harmala or wild rue in a corner of the tombs and pour some salt on the fire, and recite a poem saying: the Peganum harmala is bitter and salt is salty so the jealous eye of the enemy be blind. In Iran, it is a national holiday and all city streets are lit to commemorate the birth date of Imam Al Mahdi, the last Shia imam.

==== Iraq ====
In Iraq, people give children candies as they walk through their neighborhoods. Sunni Muslims and non-Muslim Yazidi Kurds in Iraqi Kurdistan celebrate this holiday 15 days before Ramadan.

==== Turkey ====
Berat Kandili is the name for Mid-Sha’ban and it is considered a sacred day in Turkey. Muslim holiday celebrations have been called Kandil (Arabic: qindīl, oil lamp) since Sultan Selim II of the Ottoman Empire after burning lamps to light up minarets on the occasion of special blessed nights.

=== South Asia ===
In South Asia, Muslims make sweets (especially halwa or zarda) to give to neighbors and the poor on the evening before the 15th of Sha’ban.

==== Bangladesh ====
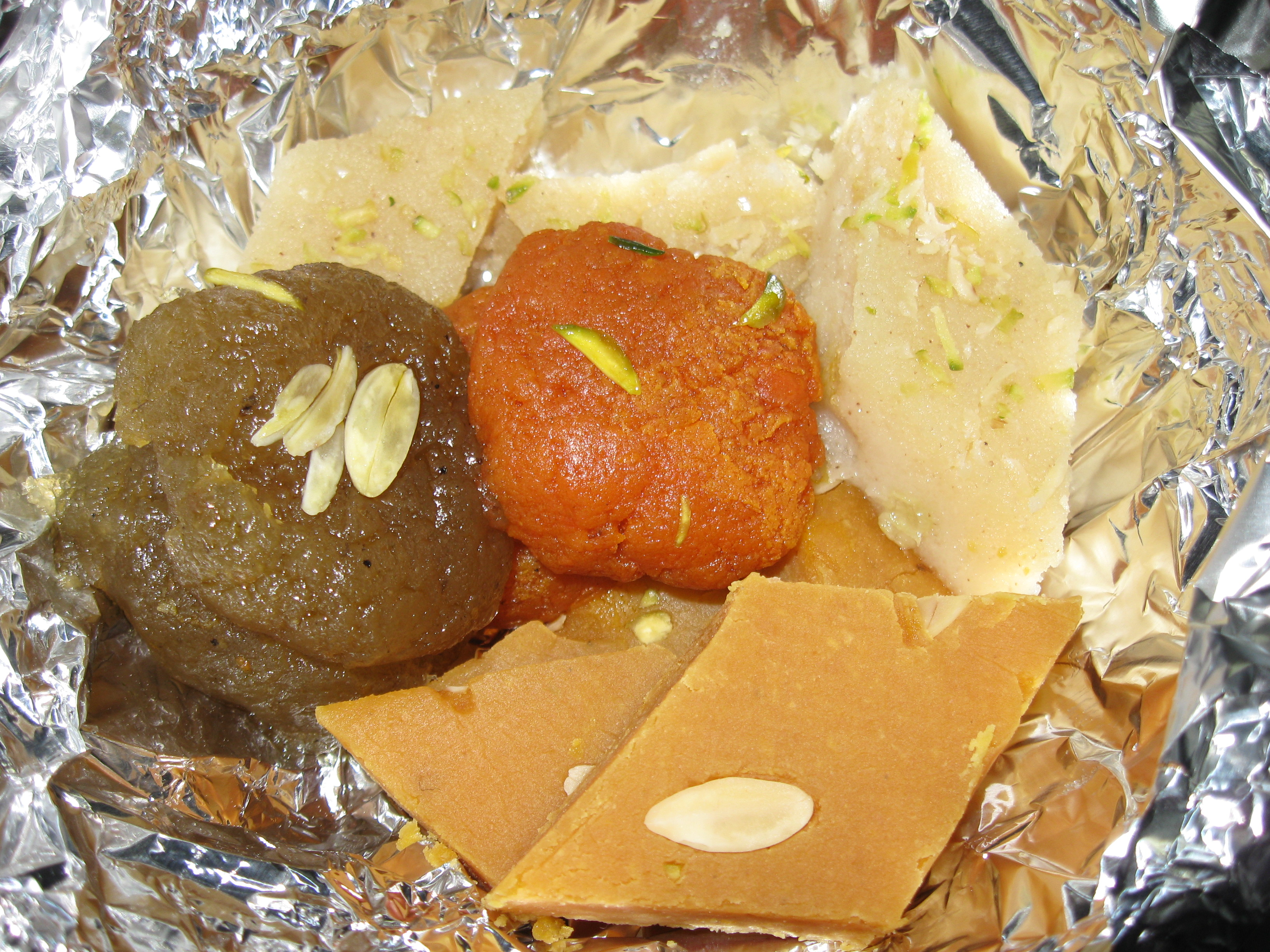
Bangladeshi halwa

Shab-e-Barat is observed by Bengali Muslims. Many schools remain closed on that day. Many people fast, pray after the isha prayer, read the Quran, barter bread and sweets and donate to the impoverished on that day. People visit graveyards, pray and light candles and incense and place flowers. Shab-e-Barat and lanes of Old Dhaka get bustling with shops vending these soft, fluffy decorative pieces of bread, using traditional motifs such as fish and kalka. Alongside the traditional decorative breads, colorful Bengali sweets such as halua, borfi, sandesh, pitha, kheer er putli, rasmalai, nikuti, naru, moya as well as savoury dishes like boondi kabab polao and hari kababs are served. Buildings get illuminated and decorated by traditional lighting such as diyas, candles and lanterns, cloth architectures (shamiana) and paperworks. Children engage in fireworks and burn fireworks and crackers. Religious cultural programs such as waz mehfil, Quran recitation, na'at mehfil, Bengali ghazal mehfil, qasida, tabarruk distribution and mezban are held in mosques and other places. Shab-e-Barat has now become a cultural festival of Bengalis.

==== India ====
Historically, Shab-e-Barat in India has been associated with fasting, visiting mosques and charity. The Darul Uloom Deoband seminary in India has opined that individual worship on the night of 15th Shaban is mustahab (virtuous) but practices such as lighting bulbs, preparing a variety of dishes, wearing new clothes, making halwa and collective worship in mosques are bid'ah (innovation) and should be avoided.

People belonging to the Muslim community of India pray all night and also recite the Quran. They start their prayers after sunset and pray until suhur. On the next day down, before azaan, sehri is eaten. Devotees also believe that Shab-e-Barat is the night when Allah decides the fortunes of people. On the occasion people wish each other "Shab-e-Barat Mubarak".

==== Pakistan ====
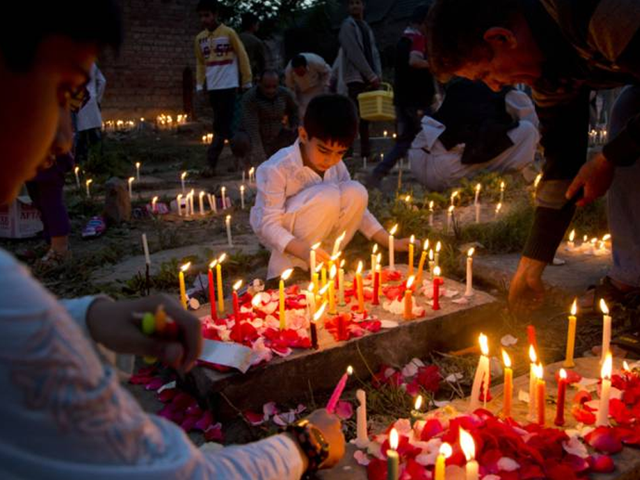
A child lighting candles and scent sticks on the graves of the deceased, a tradition among some families to seek forgiveness of their loved ones.

The ulema and religious scholars in their sermons highlight teachings of Islam while different gatherings and Mahafil-e-Naat are arranged to mark the holy night.

Shab-e-Barat is observed throughout Pakistan, and is an optional holiday that can be chosen from employment and holiday laws in Pakistan. Some employees may choose to take this day off, though most offices and businesses remain open.

Traditional sweets like halwa, savaiyyan (vermicelli) and flatbread are prepared and shared with neighbours, friends and relatives, and the poor.

Flowers are also placed on graves of deceased family members besides offering fatiha for them.

In various places, it is a common tradition to offer prayers to Allah for forgiveness on behalf of the deceased, which is why people visit the graves of their loved ones, offer prayers and light candles and scent sticks at the graves of their loved ones.

The houses, streets and mosques are decorated with colourful pennants and buntings.

=== Southeast Asia ===
==== Indonesia ====
Muslims in Indonesia do communal dhikr devotions in mosques followed by a lecture (ceramah) led by an ustadz. This tradition is rarely followed in Indonesia, but it is widely followed in Aceh, West Sumatra, and South Kalimantan.

== See also ==
- Obon
- Pitru Paksha
- All Saints' Day
- All Souls' Day
- Day of the Dead
- Thursday of the Dead
