= Akhiri Chahar Shambah =

Islamic holy day

- Observed by: Indian, Pakistani, Bangladeshi, Afghan and Persian Muslims
- Significance: Muhammad's temporary recovery
- Observances: Nafl prayers, donations, prayers
- Date: Last Wednesday of Safar
- Frequency: Annual

Akhiri Chahar Shambah is a holy day for Muslims of the Indian subcontinent and Iran. It is an Arabic and Persian word-pair; its Arabic part is akheri, meaning "last" and the Persian part is chahar sambah, meaning "Wednesday".

== Origin ==
At the beginning of Hijri 11, Muhammad fell seriously ill. Gradually his physical condition started to deteriorate. He became so ill that he could not even lead the prayer. He recovered on Wednesday, the 28th Safar. The day was the last Wednesday of the month of Safar.

On this day feeling somewhat better, he took a bath and led the prayer for the last time. The people of Medina came to know about this news and came in groups to see him. All of them offered charity, prayers and prayers in thanksgiving. Some of his followers freed their slaves and donated money or camels. On that day Abu Bakr donated 5 thousand, Umar 7 thousand, Uthman 10 thousand, Ali 3 thousand dirhams and Abd al-Rahman ibn Awf donated 100 camels.

== Observances ==
Although there is a difference of opinion among religious scholars regarding the observance of this day, this day is observed in the light of certain rules. The day is originally celebrated as 'Thanksgiving Day'; So that after taking bath and performing two rak'as Al-Shukr Nafl prayers, prayers for freedom from disease and charity are done. Islamic mehfils are held in various mosques, madrasas, darbars, khanqahs to observe this day. On this day, various educational institutions in Bangladesh are officially closed as well as considered as an optional holiday in offices and courts.
