= People of the Ditch =

Story in the Quran

People of the Ditch (Arabic: أصحاب الأخدود, romanized: ʿaṣ'ḥābu l-ʿukhdūdi) is a story mentioned in Surah 85 (Al-Burooj) of the Qur'an. It is about people who were thrown into a ditch and set afire, due to their belief in Allah.

The narrative was telling about a story of a Malik (Arabic: مَـلِـك, King) that had a sahir (Arabic: سَـاحِـر, magician) in the days before Muhammad. As the magician grew old and his lifetime was nearly over, he asked the King to choose a smart boy to learn sihr (Arabic: سِـحْـر, magic) from him. However, as the boy was training in magic, he met a monk everyday on the way to the magic class, and finally became a true believer in God. As a result, he could save people and treat sick people in unusual ways. When the King learned of this, he commanded the boy to abandon his faith in God. The boy rejected the King's command, so he was killed. The King also burned those who followed the boy's deen (Arabic: ديـن, religion), in one or more ditches.

== Story in Suratul-Buruj ==
The verses 4 to 7 are the story of a group of devout people, who were burned in a ditch. The main text and English translation of the verses are in the following table:

Verse	Arabic text	English translation
4	قُتِلَ أَصْحَابُ الْأُخْدُودِ	Woe to the makers of the pit (of fire),
5	النَّارِ‌ ذَاتِ الْوَقُودِ	Fire supplied (abundantly) with fuel:
6	إِذْ هُمْ عَلَيْهَا قُعُودٌ	Behold! they sat over against the (fire),
7	وَهُمْ عَلَىٰ مَا يَفْعَلُونَ بِالْمُؤْمِنِينَ شُهُودٌ	And they witnessed (all) that they were doing against the Believers.

Then the Qur'an adds that they were killed in this way only because they believed in Allah. Then it mentioned the fate of torturers in verses 8 to 10:

Verse	Arabic text	English translation
8	وَمَا نَقَمُوا مِنْهُمْ إِلَّا أَن يُؤْمِنُوا بِاللَّـهِ الْعَزِيزِ الْحَمِيدِ	And they ill-treated them for no other reason than that they believed in Allah, Exalted in Power, Worthy of all Praise!
9	الَّذِي لَهُ مُلْكُ السَّمَاوَاتِ وَالْأَرْ‌ضِ ۚ وَاللَّـهُ عَلَىٰ كُلِّ شَيْءٍ شَهِيدٌ	Him to Whom belongs the dominion of the heavens and the earth! And Allah is Witness to all things.
10	إِنَّ الَّذِينَ فَتَنُوا الْمُؤْمِنِينَ وَالْمُؤْمِنَاتِ ثُمَّ لَمْ يَتُوبُوا فَلَهُمْ عَذَابُ جَهَنَّمَ وَلَهُمْ عَذَابُ الْحَرِ‌يقِ	Those who persecute (or draw into temptation) the Believers, men and women, and do not turn in repentance, will have the Penalty of Hell: They will have the Penalty of the Burning Fire.

The full detailed story of the Islamic narrative about the burning of the devout peoples in the trench were found in a long Hadith transmitted by Ṣuhayb ibn Sinan and on the authority of Sahih Muslim record as following:

Muhammad told the story of an anonymous king who forced his people to worship him, who had a magician as his advisor. When the magician was in his old age, he asked the king to appoint a young man to be his apprentice to inherit his position. So the king ordered a young boy to learn magic from the elder magician.

In the middle of his training, the boy met a priest, who taught and advised him with monotheism and Abrahamic religions—causing him to be late to attend the magic training, which caused him to be punished by the magician. For the following days, the young man will seek reasons for his late arrival to training, while he continues to listen to the priest's teachings. This continued until one day, when a large animal blocked the boy's path to the training place. The boy then initiatively practices the teaching of the priest by praying to God to get rid of the animal that was blocking his way. This miraculously succeeded, causing the boy to resolve his belief in the priest's teaching and renounce black magic. After telling the priest about the incident, he bid farewell to the boy, saying he had nothing more to teach him.

From then on, the boy worked to heal the disease and blindness of the people of the kingdom by praying to God. Until one of the king's close friends, who was blind for a long time, heard of the boy's ability to cure blindness and came to him to ask him to heal his eyes. Then the boy asked him to pray to God for curing his eyes, which he did. Then his eyes were cured instantly. However, as the king became curious about the accident, he asked his friend who healed his sight, to which his friend responded that it was Allah (God) who healed his eyes. This infuriated the king, who then tortured him and forced him to tell him about the boy who taught him. After he caught the boy, he then tortured the boy to tell who taught him, to which the boy testified that it was the priest who taught him. The king then also caught the priest, who was forced to abandon his faith and worship the king under the threat of execution. The priest refused, prompting the king to execute the priest by sawing his head from the middle of his skull. After the priest died, the king called his friend, whose blindness was cured by the boy. He forced him to renounce the faith, or he would be executed in a similar manner, which he responded to similarly, prompting him to be executed similarly.

After that, the time has come for the boy to be put on trial by the king. He threatened the boy with execution in a different manner, which is by being thrown from the top of a mountain. However, as the boy was about to be thrown from the top, he prayed, which caused the mountain to be miraculously shaken in a sudden, killing all the king's soldiers who were escorting him, while leaving him unharmed. As the shocked king asked how he could be uninjured, the boy responded by saying he won't be able to kill him unless he fulfils a specific condition, which is by crucifying the boy on a palm frond, then shot him with an arrow by saying "Bismillah Rabb al-Ghulam (By the name of Allah, God of this boy)". The king did so by shooting an arrow while saying the words. As the arrow struck the boy, he immediately died.

However, the masses who gathered around the execution field were amazed by this and declared that they had now converted to the faith of the boy. The king became furious upon hearing this and ordered a ditch to be dug in the street, where a fire was then lit. Throwing all the people who converted to the ditch, including women and babies.

This narrative was told in several later era chronicles, such as Al-Sirah al-Nabawiyyah by Ibn Hisham.

Hima inscription proclaiming Dhu Nuwas' violent exploits near Najran

Ibn Ishaq chronicle, which was translated to English language by Alfred Guillaume, interpreted this passage to be an allusion to the killing of the Christians of Najran by order of the King Dhu Nuwas. According to Christian sources, this event took place around 523 C.E. Dhu Nuwas converted to Judaism and chose Joseph as his new name. He went to Najran to force the Christian people there to convert to Judaism. When they refused, the King threw them alive into one or more burning ditches.

There is also a hadith that God chose a Nabi (Arabic: نَـبِي, Prophet) in Abyssinia, but the people of Abyssinia denied him. At last the prophet and his companions (Arabic: أصـحـاب) were burned in a ditch.

In Shia Islam tradition, It was reported by Shaykh Tabarsi in Majma' al-Bayan; that companions of Daniyal (Daniel) were burned in a ditch.

Outside of Qur'anic and Hadith, Abdulrahman al-Ansary has mentioned that two 6th AD Christian chronicle s Risalat Shami'un al'arshami al-Thaniya (The Second Epistle of Simeon of Beth Arsham) and Kitab Istishad al-Harith (The Book of Martyrdom of Al-Harith) has mentioned the occurrence of the burning.

=== Meaning of 'Ukhdud' ===
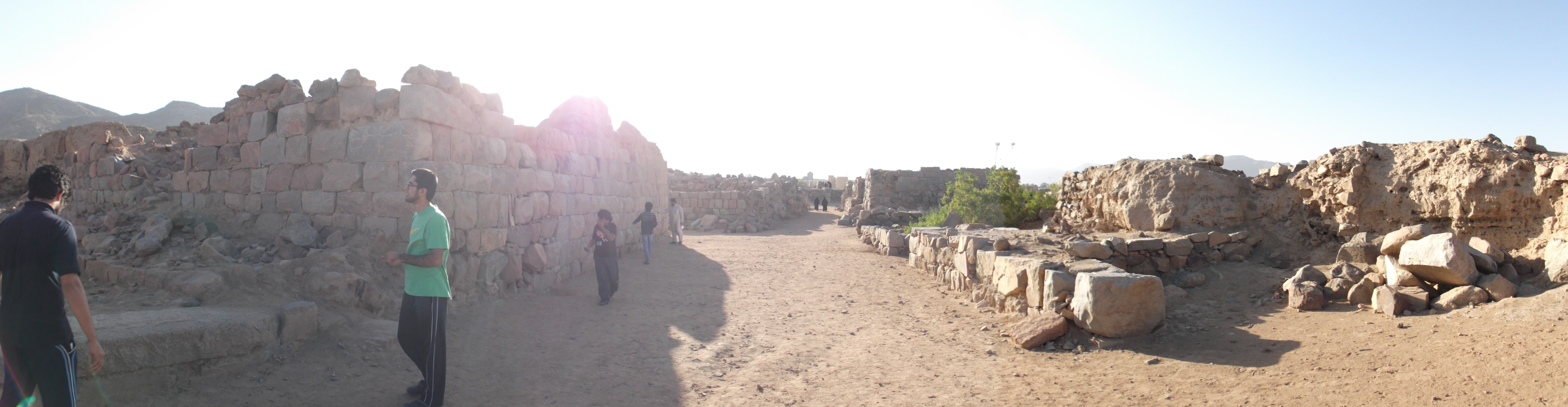
Panoramic view of the al-Okhdood archeological site

According to the Al-Mufradat fi Gharib al-Quran, "Ukhdud" (Arabic: أخـدود) is basically derived from "Khadd" (Arabic: خـد), and it means "wide and deep ditch spread on the land." It is called this because it is believed to be where the burning took place. It was also known as Martyrs of the trench, or alternatively dubbed as Martyrs of Najran by Irfan Shahid. The Ashab al-Ukhdud were considered as Shahid, or martyrs in Islam, due to their sacrifice to keep their faith despite being threatened to be thrown in a ditch of which lit with fire by Dhu Nuwas, a king of Himyarite Kingdom which embrace Judaism.

== Time and place of the event ==
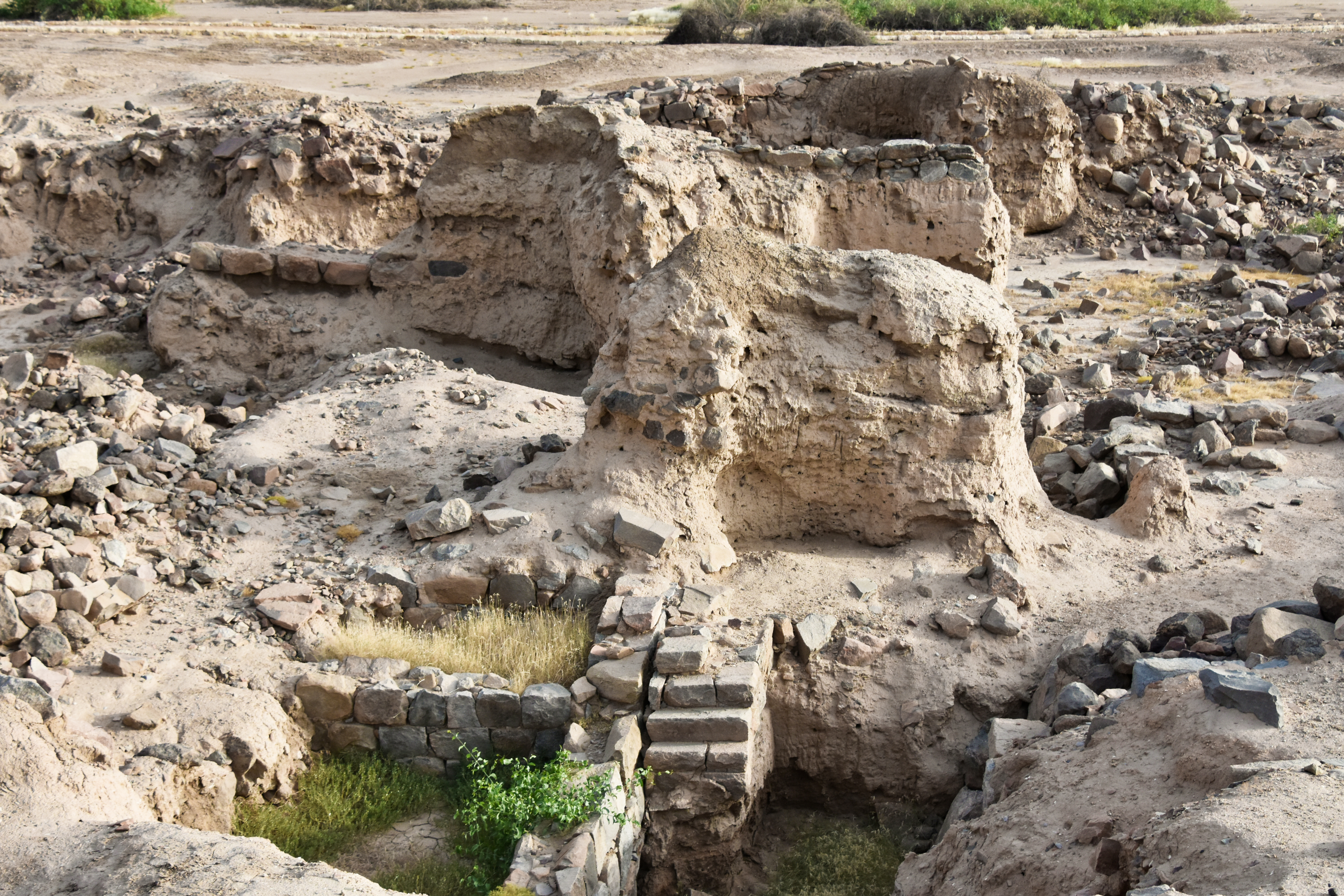
Excavations at the site

It was popularly believed the event occurred in modern day Al-Ukhdud, a historical place located 5 km (3.1 miles) south of Najran city in Saudi Arabia. The event of Al-Ukhdud occurred in 520 or 523 ACE, in the time of Dhu Nuwas, the last Himyarite King.

However, there are several versions about the place of the genocide. Abu Ishaq al-Tha'labi recorded some chronicles that it happened several times in several places such as Yemen, Constantinople, Babylon, Iraq, and Al-Sham; and that this story is not about just one such event.

Meanwhile, modern researcher and archaeologist Abdulrahman al-Ansary from King Saud University cast doubt that the burning of the Christians by the Yemen king occurred in Najran. He explained that some contemporary local chronicles suggested the notion that it happened in Najran. However, Yemeni inscriptions which believed belongs to King Yusuf Asar (517-527 AD), which was suspected as the legendary Dhu Nuwas who ordered the massacre, did not indicate that he burned Christians in Najran for several reasons:

- The most famous of these is the inscription found in the wells of Hima, which consists of 12 lines in records dated 518 AD. The first line is read as follows: "May Alan, who owns the heavens and the earth, bless King Yusuf Asar Yathar, king of all peoples, and bless the kings", Abdulrahman al-Ansary has stated this means the king asked for blessings from his god, and (Alan: Allah), which indicates that Yusuf was neither Jewish nor Christian. This further add skepticism of Abdulrahman with the reasoning that If the incident of the burning occurred in Najran, and it was carried out by King Yusuf Asar, then it must have occurred approximately between the years 518-520 AD. Meanwhile, Abdulrahman also quoted the tradition from Al-Tabari work History of the Prophets and Kings which traced to Aisha, that the Muslim community in 7th AD identified the Himyarite king during the alleged era of Yusuf Asar as Abrahamic monotheism believer, unlike the polytheistic Dhu Nuwas.
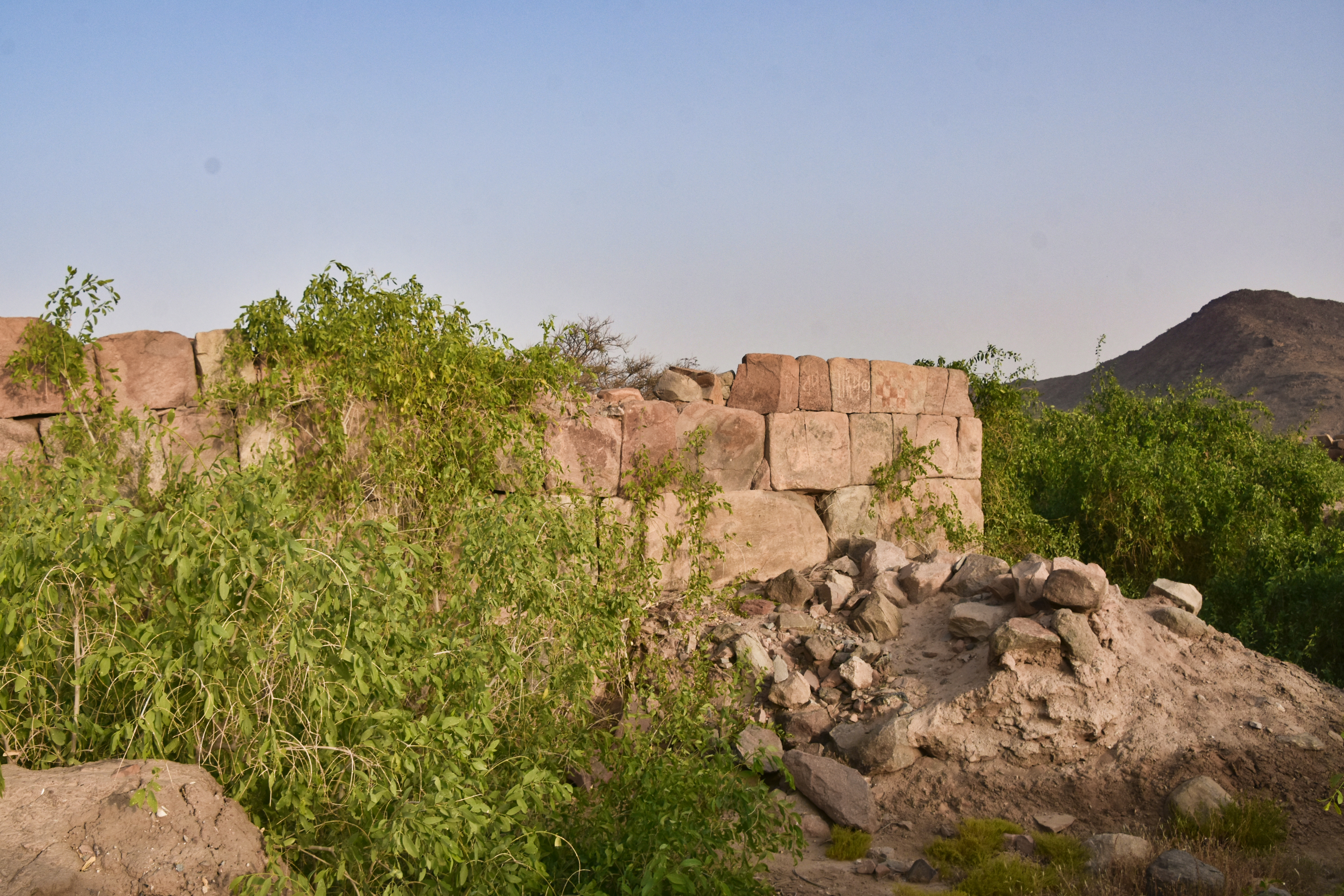
- Ruins of the Kaaba of Najran near the ruins of al-Okhdood, this former polytheistic place of worship likely was turned into the main church in Najran prior its destruction by Dhu Nuwas
  Abdulrahman stated there is no building was found in the ancient city of Najran that resembles a church or any Christians worshipping place.
- The inscriptions that were found written on the stones of the buildings of the ancient city of al-Ukhdud sites were limited to the paganism period of the city, and no inscriptions were found that refer to the Judaism and Christian religions.
- The appearance of the Quss Ibn Sa'ida al-Iyadi, contemporary of Zayd ibn Amr and Waraqah ibn Nawfal; who was appeared in sirah records as pre-Islamic Christian who belong to the Monotheism Christian. In light of this, Abdulrahman connected that Quss's Christian denomination traced to same denomination with the Christians who were massacred by the Yemeni king, who belongs to different group from the Najrani Christians which met by Muhammad in 631 AD. the first group which burned was considered as the "true Christians" according to Qur'anic narrative of al-Buruj chapter, who worshipped monotheistic God, while the second group of Najrani Christians that met and debate with Muhammad in 631 AD was Christians group who believed in Trinity doctrine.
- The Qur'anic narrative did not explicitly mention Najran as precise place where the event occurred.

== In culture ==
The animated film, The Boy and the King, is a movie about people of the ditch.

The Saudi football club Al-Okhdood are named for the People of the Ditch.

== See also ==
- Christian community of Najran
- ʿĀd
- People of Lut (Lot)
- People of Ya-Sin
- Thamud
- Pharaoh of the Exodus
- Verse of ikmal al-din
- Verse of Loan
- Verse of wilayah
- Verse of Brotherhood
- Verse of purification
- Hadith of warning
- Verse of Evil Eye
- Verse of obedience
- Muhammad in the Quran
- Battle of Karbala
