= Muhammad in the Quran =

The Quran enumerates little about the early life of the Islamic Messenger Muhammad or other biographic details, but it talks about his prophetic mission, his moral character, and theological issues regarding him. According to the Quran Muhammad is the last in a chain of prophets sent by God (33:40).

The name "Muhammad" is mentioned four times in the Quran, and the name "Ahmad" (another variant of the name of Muhammad) is mentioned one time. However, Muhammad is also referred to with various titles such as the Messenger of Allah , unlettered, etc., and many verses about Muhammad refer directly or indirectly to him. Also, Surah (chapter) 47 of the Quran is called "Muhammad".

== Mentions of name, titles, qualities ==
=== Mentions of Muhammad or Ahmad ===
Sura	Verse	Link	English translation (by Abdullah Yusuf Ali)
Al Imran (Arabic: آل عمران)	144	3:144	Muhammad is only a messenger: many Were the messenger that passed away before him. If he died or were slain, will ye then Turn back on your heels? If any did turn back on his heels, not the least harm will he do to Allah; but Allah (on the other hand) will swiftly reward those who (serve Him) with gratitude.
Al-Ahzab (Arabic: سورة الأحزاب)	40	33:40	Muhammad is not the father of any of your men, but (he is) the Messenger of Allah and the Seal of the Prophets: and Allah has full knowledge of all things.
Muhammad (Arabic: سورة محمد)	2	47:2	But those who believe and work deeds of righteousness, and believe in the (Revelation) sent down to Muhammad - for it is the Truth from their Lord,- He will remove from them their ills and improve their condition.
Al-Fath (Arabic: سورة الفتح)	29	48:29	Muhammad is the messenger of Allah; and those who are with him are strong against Unbelievers, (but) compassionate amongst each other. Thou wilt see them bow and prostrate themselves (in prayer), seeking Grace from Allah and (His) Good Pleasure. On their faces are their marks, (being) the traces of their prostration. This is their similitude in the Taurat; and their similitude in the Gospel is: like a seed which sends forth its blade, then makes it strong; it then becomes thick, and it stands on its own stem, (filling) the sowers with wonder and delight. As a result, it fills the Unbelievers with rage at them. Allah has promised those among them who believe and do righteous deeds forgiveness, and a great Reward.
As-Saff (Arabic: سورة الصف)	6	61:6	And remember, Jesus, the son of Mary, said: "O Children of Israel! I am the messenger of Allah (sent) to you, confirming the Law (which came) before me, and giving Glad Tidings of a Messenger to come after me, whose name shall be Ahmad." But when he came to them with Clear Signs, they said, "this is evident sorcery!"

=== Other titles and qualities ===
There are also references to Muhammad as "Messenger", "Messenger of God",(such as in Quran 3:144, 33:40 and 48:29). Other terms are used, including "Warner", "bearer of glad tidings", and the "one who invites people to a Single God" (12:108, and 33:45–46), "Seal of the Prophets" (Khatam an-Nabiyyin) 33:40 i.e. there will be no more prophets after him), a "Summoner unto Allah" and "a Lamp that gives bright light" 33:46

Verse 29:48 -- "And you did not recite before it any scripture, nor did you inscribe one with your right hand. Otherwise the falsifiers would have had [cause for] doubt"—is thought to indicate that Muhammad was illiterate and had not read any earlier scriptures.

The Quran disclaims any superhuman characteristics for Muhammad but describes him as a man possessing the highest moral excellence (Quran 68:4 "And thou dost, surely, possess sublime moral excellences"). God made him a good example or a "goodly model" for Muslims to follow (68:4, and 33:21), full of sympathy for Muslims ("Grievous to him is what you suffer; [he is] concerned over you and to the believers is kind and merciful" 9:128). In Islamic tradition, Muhammad's relation to humanity is as a bringer of truth (God's message to humanity), and as a blessing (39:33, and 21:107) whose message will give people salvation in the afterlife. It is believed by at least one pious commentator that it is Muhammad's teachings and the purity of his personal life alone that keep alive the worship of God.

== Involvement in doctrine, mission, life ==
While the Quran does not tell the story of Muhammad's life, a number of verses of the Quran concerning Muhammad affect Islamic doctrine, or refer to Muhammad's mission or personal life.

=== Quran ===
Some verses in the Quran concern a particular role of Muhammad (that is; being the spreader of ‘the message’). These include:

- 3:31–32 "If you should love Allah, then follow me [i.e. Muhammad], ... Say, 'Obey Allah and the Messenger.'"
- 4:59 "O ye who believe! Obey Allah, and obey the Messenger, and those charged with authority among you...." (known as the Obedience Verse)
- 4:69 "And whoever obeys Allah and the Messenger - those will be with the ones upon whom Allah has bestowed favor of the prophets ..."
- 24:54 "Say: Obey Allah and obey the Messenger, ... If you obey him, you shall be on the right guidance"
- 33:21 "In God's messenger you have indeed a good example for everyone who looks forward with hope to God and the Last Day ..."

These verses say to obey the messenger only, referring to the role of the spread of the message. The message in particular is in reference to the Quran itself, in which lies the message of God within the complied verses. The key term 'messenger' is important because the titles used refer to specifically different roles of Muhammad. When 'Muhammad' is used, it is only in reference to his life and not his prophet hood. Whereas with the use of Nabi, it refers to his role and status as prophet only. This is why it's crucial to acknowledge the difference between these different titles, since 'messenger' in these verses refer only to the spreading of the Quran.

=== Muhammad's mission ===
Many important events and turning points in the mission of Muhammad were connected with revelations from the Quran, although the verses are not necessarily addressed to Muhammad. (Like many verses in the Quran, they often refer to an event/story/moral without explaining the dispute/issue involved. These are made clear by Quranic commentary, by prophetic biography and/or by hadith.)

==== Holy months ====
After being forced to migrate to Medina, the early Muslims began raiding Pagan caravans to weaken their economy and to regain some of what was lost from their homes. In their first successful raid, the Pagan caravan's merchandise was captured, one caravan guard was killed and two were captured. The first raid happened, however, during one of the Arab "sacred months" (the 1st, 7th, 11th and 12th months of the Arab calendar) where fighting was typically prohibited. While some of his followers were initially dismayed at this violation of tradition, Muhammad soon received divine revelation explaining the justification behind the attacks.

- 2:217 "They ask you about the sacred month - about fighting therein. Say, "Fighting therein is great [sin], but averting [people] from the way of Allah and disbelief in Him and [preventing access to] al-Masjid al-Haram and the expulsion of its people therefrom are greater [evil] in the sight of Allah. And oppression is greater than killing."

==== Battle of Badr ====
The first battle the Muslims fought against their unbeliever enemies at Badr in 624 CE was a victory where Muslims killed several important Meccan leaders. The battle is mentioned in the Quran as an example of how God helped Muslims and who should show gratitude in return.

- 3:123 "And already had Allah given you victory at [the battle of] Badr while you were few in number. Then fear Allah; perhaps you will be grateful." A verse (apparently addressed to Muhammad) also talks about 3000 angels that helped the believers in this battle.
- 3:124 "[Remember] when you said to the believers, 'Is it not sufficient for you that your Lord should reinforce you with three thousand angels sent down?'"

==== Battle of Uhud ====
A year later Muslims suffered a setback against a superior force of Meccans at the Battle of Uhud when several dozen Muslims were killed and Muhammad was wounded. A verse revealed soon after explained why if Muslims had God's favor they had not won the battle as they had at Badr: they disobeyed the Muhammad's orders and were hasty in collecting loot before the battle was won.

- 3:152 "And Allah had certainly fulfilled His promise to you when you were killing the enemy by His permission until [the time] when you lost courage and fell to disputing about the order [given by the Prophet] and disobeyed after He had shown you that which you love."

==== Battle of the Trench ====
Verses 33:10–22 recalls the doubts and fears of some of inhabitants of Medina in the pivotal Battle of the Trench where Muhammad led the Muslims in digging a protective trench and overcame a siege by 10,000 Meccan unbelievers. (Some had lost faith and abandoned the city.) In response to his followers abandoning of work on the trench without Muhammad's permission (prior to the battle), a verse was revealed telling them not to:

- 24:62 "Only those are believers, who believe in God and His Messenger. when they are with him on a matter requiring collective action, they do not depart until they have asked for his leave ..."

==== Jizyah ====
After the Quraish tribe was vanquished and Mecca was conquered, a new position(according to Western scholar Alfred Guillaume) towards the non-Muslims living under the Islamic state was established . A verse was revealed requiring all non-muslims (excluding elderly persons, women, children, and monks) to pay a special tax (jizyah) in return for the military protection of the Islamic state(including the right to not participate in any defensive or offensive wars).

- 9:29 "Fight those who do not believe in Allah or in the Last Day and who do not consider unlawful what Allah and His Messenger have made unlawful and who do not adopt the religion of truth from those who were given the Scripture - [fight] until they give the jizyah willingly while they are humbled."

=== Involvement in Muhammad's personal life ===
While the Quran's message is eternal and universal, a number of Quranic verses refer to specific issues in the life of Muhammad.

Some verses pertaining to Muhammad's marital relations, these include

- 33:50 which gave Muhammad the right to marry daughters of his aunts and uncles "a privilege for you only, not for the (rest of) the believers" (who were limited to four wives). Most of Muhammad's marriages were for geopolitical reasons or to correct social taboos (e.g. remarriage of widows etc.)
- 33:51 gave Muhammad the right to "... postpone (the turn in bed of) whom you will of them (your wives), and you may receive whom you will ..." telling his wives they "should be content and not grieve and that they should be satisfied with what you have given them." Muhammad was told that he need not observe a strict rotation, although he himself, impelled by an inborn sense of fairness, always endeavored to give them a feeling of absolute equality.
- After Muhammad married Zaynab bint Jahsh, the ex-wife of his adopted son Zayd ibn Harithah, who had divorced her because they did not get along, causing some consternation in the community, verse 33:37 was revealed, saying in part "...We gave her [Zaynab bint Jahsh] to you in marriage, so that (in future) there may be no difficulty to the believers in respect of (the marriage of) the wives of their adopted sons..." Mohammad has endeavored to save the marriage since it was made on the basis of a slave being equal to a free man.
- During a dispute with his wives where Muhammad boycotted his wives for a month, the following verses were revealed: "O Prophet! Why do you ban (for yourself) that which God has made lawful to you" (66:1), and chastising two wives (Aisha and Hafsa bint Umar) for betraying a confidence (66:3–5). However the majority of Muslim scholars regard a different Asbāb al-nuzūl (circumstance of revelation) for Surah 66:1-5, namely the "honey-incident":
  The Prophet (ﷺ) used to stay (for a period) in the house of Zaynab bint Jahsh (one of the wives of the Prophet ) and he used to drink honey in her house. Hafsa bint Umar and I decided that when the Prophet (ﷺ) entered upon either of us, she would say, "I smell in you the bad smell of Maghafir (a bad smelling raisin). Have you eaten Maghafir?" When he entered upon one of us, she said that to him. He replied (to her), "No, but I have drunk honey in the house of Zaynab bint Jahsh, and I will never drink it again." Then the following verse was revealed: 'O Prophet ! Why do you ban (for you) that which Allah has made lawful for you?. ..(up to) If you two (wives of the Prophet (ﷺ) turn in repentance to Allah.' (66.1-4) The two were 'Aisha and Hafsa And also the Statement of Allah: 'And (Remember) when the Prophet (ﷺ) disclosed a matter in confidence to one of his wives!' (66.3) i.e., his saying, "But I have drunk honey."
- 33:53 includes several regulations for his followers such as entering any of Muhammad's houses "except when you are permitted for a meal, without awaiting its readiness", attempting "to remain for conversation" after the meal, talking to any of his wives except behind a partition, or remarrying any of them "after him, ever. Indeed, that would be in the sight of Allah an enormity." Muhammad's wives are referred to as Mother of the Believers and were given the choice of forsaking him for the life of this world and its charms (Quran 33: 29).

While some have criticized these revelations as "convenient", encouraging Muhammad's "personal indulgences" and suggesting that the verses may actually have been concocted by Muhammad and not revealed by God, Muslims have pointed out various reasons for their wisdom. At that time, it was a common practice for men to have slave concubines and was not considered adultery; "Why must he (or anyone else, for that matter) prohibit something for themselves when God has not prohibited it for them?" Muhammad had special obligations, such as praying at night (Tahajjud), as well as privileges. The wives of Muhammad were forbidden from remarrying because they were considered to be the "mothers of the believers" (33:6).

== See also ==
- Ahmad the Paraclete
- Mahammaddim in the Song of Solomon
- Muhammad and the Bible
- Verse of ikmal al-din
- Verse of Loan
- Verse of wilayah
- Warning verse
- Verse of Brotherhood
- Verse of purification
- People of the Ditch
- The verse of evil eye
- Obedience verse
- Verse of mawadda
- List of characters and names mentioned in the Quran
- Ali in the Quran
- Ali in the Hadith
- Fatima in the Quran and Hadith
- Hasan ibn Ali in the Quran and Hadith
- Husayn ibn Ali in the Quran and Hadith
