= Al-Qalam 51-52 =

Two verses from the 68th Sura of the Quran

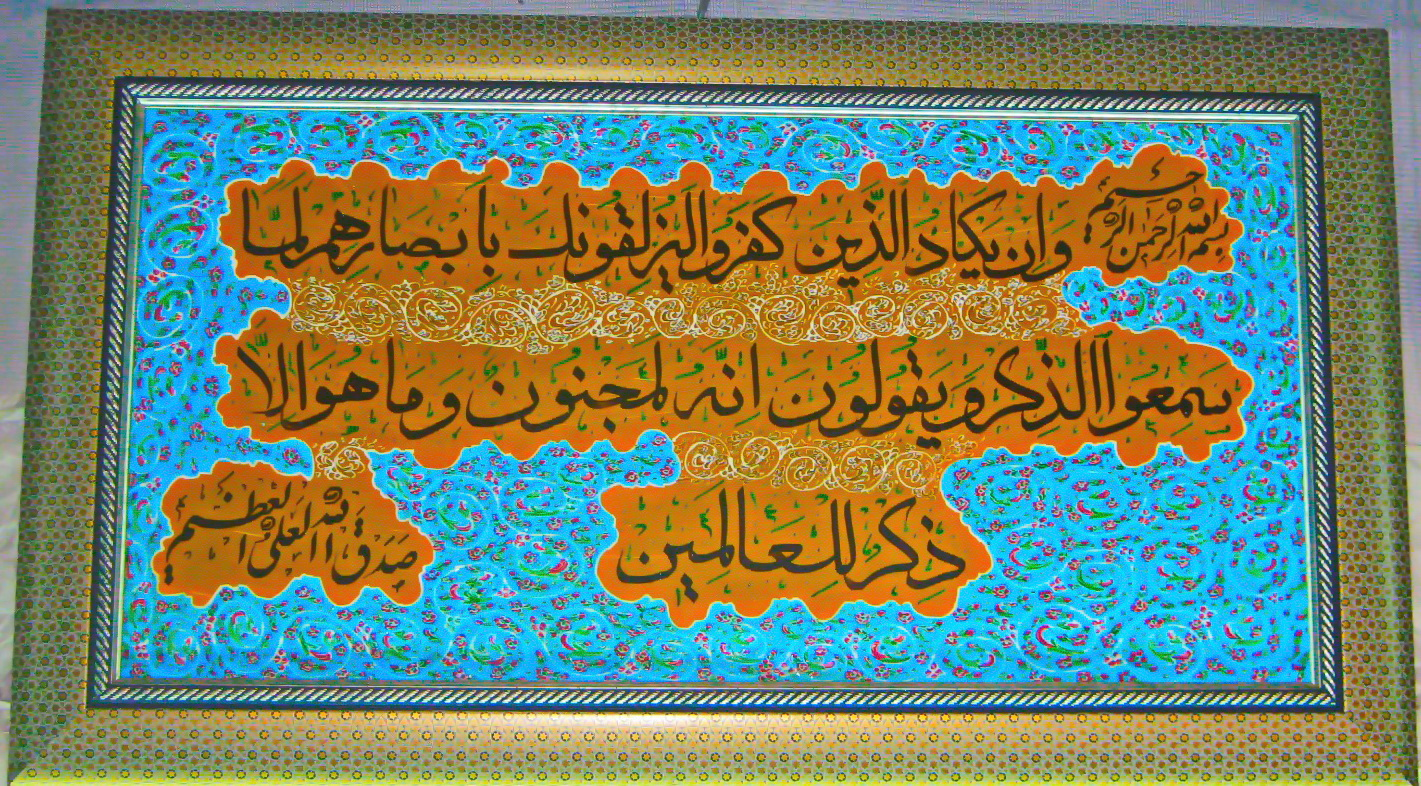
An Iranian art related to verse of evil eye

The Verse of Evil Eye (Arabic: آیه وَإِن يَكَادُ) is verses 51 and 52 of Al-Qalam (Q68:51-52) in the Quran. It is usually recited for protection from the evil eye. It states: "And indeed, those who disbelieve would almost make you slip with their eyes when they hear the message, and they say: Indeed, he is mad. But it is not except a reminder to the worlds (68:51 and 52)."

== The context of the verse ==
وَإِن يَكَادُ ٱلَّذِينَ كَفَرُوا۟ لَيُزْلِقُونَكَ بِأَبْصَٰرِهِمْ لَمَّا سَمِعُوا۟ ٱلذِّكْرَ وَيَقُولُونَ إِنَّهُۥ لَمَجْنُونٌ

Verse 51: And indeed, those who disbelieve would almost make you slip with their eyes when they hear the message, and they say, "Indeed, he is mad."

وَمَا هُوَ إِلَّا ذِكْرٌۭ لِّلْعَٰلَمِينَ

Verse 52: But it is not except a reminder to the worlds.

== Exegesis ==
The verse refers to an evil eye. This meant that they wanted to make Muhammad sick and die with a special kind of look. It also suggests that the verse is a metonymy for 'very angry glances', as they looked very furiously as if they wanted to kill Muhammad. In addition, the grudges of the disbelievers led them to a contradiction. On the one hand, they understood the importance of the Quran insofar as they desired the destruction of the Islamic Prophet, but on the other hand, they accused him of madness.

== See also ==
- Verse of Ikmal al-Din
- Verse of Loan
- Verse of Wilayah
- Warning Verse
- Verse of Brotherhood
- Verse of purification
- People of Ditch
- Muhammad in the Quran
- Obedience verse
- Verse of mawadda
