= Verse of Brotherhood =

The Verse of Brotherhood (Arabic: آیة الأُخُوَّة, romanized: Āyat al-Ukhuwwah) is the tenth verse of the Quranic chapter "Al-Hujurat" (Q49:10). The verse is about the brotherhood of believers with each other; which says: "the believers are but brothers, so make settlement between your brothers. And fear Allah that you may receive mercy (49:10)."

Fundamental Islamic society motto is the believers are nothing else than brethren. The verse refers to equality between individuals and lack of difference in terms of ethnic group, tribe and race. It is suggested that the verse refers to the necessity of reforming between religious brothers. Brotherhood of believers in religion is another conception of the verse.

Twelver Shias believe that Muhammad instituted brotherhood between the emigrants and helpers, and he chose Ali as his own brother. According to them, this happened after the revelation of the verse of brotherhood.

== English translation of the verse ==
إِنَّمَا الْمُؤْمِنُونَ إِخْوَةٌ فَأَصْلِحُوا بَيْنَ أَخَوَيْكُمْ ۚ وَاتَّقُوا اللَّهَ لَعَلَّكُمْ تُرْحَمُونَ
The believers are nothing else than brothers. Therefore, make peace between your brethren and observe your duty to Allah that haply ye may obtain mercy.

== Theme of Al-Hujurat chapter ==
The verses of Al-Hujurat is about behavior of Muslims in their community and teaches good morality and manners. One of the important message of the chapter is brotherhood and is essential to build a moral and ethical Islamic society. In Islamic community, all Muslims are brothers and this message is revealed in the tenth verse of Al-Hujurat (the verse of brotherhood).

== Concepts of brotherhood in the verse ==
Relationship between believers should be firm and bilateral. Two brothers are same as two hands washing each other. Conflicts among brothers are to be replaced by peace and sincerity. According to a Prophetic tradition: "Muslims are brethren, they never do wrong to each other, they never forgo supporting each other, they never abandon their brethren in hardships." Imam Sadiq says: "Muslims are brethren and serves as each other’s eye and guide. They never betray each other. They never do wrong to each other. They never deceive each other. They never break their promises."

== See also ==
- Verse of ikmal al-din
- Verse of Loan
- Verse of wilaya
- Hadith of warning
- Verse of purification
- People of the Ditch
- Muhammad in the Quran
- Verse of Evil Eye
- Verse of obedience
- Verse of mawadda
