= Verse of Loan =

Longest Quranic verse

The Verse of Loan (Arabic: آية ٱلدين, ’āyatu d-dayn) is verse 282 of chapter Al-Baqara (Q2:282). It is the longest verse in the longest chapter of the Quran. This verse discusses the procedures related to debt contracts and loans.

== Text and meaning ==
يَٰٓأَيُّهَا ٱلَّذِينَ ءَامَنُوٓا۟ إِذَا تَدَايَنتُم بِدَيْنٍ إِلَىٰٓ أَجَلٍ مُّسَمًّى فَٱكْتُبُوهُ ^{ج}

[Yā’ay-yuha l-ladhīna ’āmanū ’idhā tadāyantum bidaynin ’ilā ’ajali m-musam-man faktubūh(u),]
^{282} O you who have believed, when you contract a debt for a specified term, write it down.

وَلْيَكْتُب بَّيْنَكُمْ كَاتِبٌۢ بِٱلْعَدْلِ ^{ج}

[walyaktu b-baynakum kātibum bil‘adl(i),]
And let a scribe write [it] between you in justice.

وَلَا يَأْبَ كَاتِبٌ أَن يَكْتُبَ كَمَا عَلَّمَهُ ٱللَّهُ ^{ج}

[walā yaa' ba kātibun ’an y-yaktuba kamā ‘al-lamahu l-lāh(u),]
Let no scribe refuse to write as God (God is translated as Allah in Arabic.) Allāh has taught him.

فَلْيَكْتُبْ وَلْيُمْلِلِ ٱلَّذِى عَلَيْهِ ٱلْحَقُّ وَلْيَتَّقِ ٱللَّهَ رَبَّهُۥ وَلَا يَبْخَسْ مِنْهُ شَيْـًٔا ^{ج}

[falyaktub walyumlili l-ladhī ‘alayhi l-ḥaq-qu walyat-taqi l-lāha rab-bahū walā yabkhs minhu shay’ā,]
So let him write and let the one who has the obligation [i.e., the debtor] dictate. And let him fear God Allāh, his Lord, and not leave anything out of it.

فَإِن كَانَ ٱلَّذِى عَلَيْهِ ٱلْحَقُّ سَفِيهًا أَوْ ضَعِيفًا أَوْ لَا يَسْتَطِيعُ أَن يُمِلَّ هُوَ فَلْيُمْلِلْ وَلِيُّهُۥ بِٱلْعَدْلِ ^{ج}

[fa’in kāna l-ladhī ‘alayhi l-ḥaq-qu safīhan ’aw ḍa‘ifan ’aw lā yastaṭī‘u ’an y-yumil-la huwa falyumlil waliy-yuhū bil‘adl(i),]
But if the one who has the obligation is of limited understanding or weak or unable to dictate himself, then let his guardian dictate in justice.

وَٱسْتَشْهِدُوا۟ شَهِيدَيْنِ مِن رِّجَالِكُمْ ^{صلے}

[wastashhidū shahīdayni mi r-rijālikum,]
And bring to witness two witnesses from among your men.

فَإِن لَّمْ يَكُونَا رَجُلَيْنِ فَرَجُلٌ وَٱمْرَأَتَانِ مِمَّن تَرْضَوْنَ مِنَ ٱلشُّهَدَآءِ أَن تَضِلَّ إِحْدَىٰهُمَا فَتُذَكِّرَ إِحْدَىٰهُمَا ٱلْأُخْرَىٰ ^{ج}

[fa’i l-lam yakūnā rajulayni farajulun w-wamra’atāni mim-man tarḍawna mina sh-shuhadā’i ’an taḍil-la ’iḥdāhumā fatudhak-kira ’iḥdāhumā l-’ukhrā,]
And if there are not two men [available], then a man and two women from those whom you accept as witnesses – so that if one of them errs, then the other can remind him or her.

وَلَا يَأْبَ ٱلشُّهَدَآءُ إِذَا مَا دُعُوا۟ ^{ج}

[walā ya’ba sh-shuhadā’u ’idhā mā du‘ū,]
And let not the witnesses refuse when they are called upon.

وَلَا تَسْـَٔمُوٓا۟ أَن تَكْتُبُوهُ صَغِيرًا أَوْ كَبِيرًا إِلَىٰٓ أَجَلِهِۦ ^{ج}

[walā tas’amū ’an taktubūhu ṣaghīran ’aw kabīran ’ilā ajalih(ī),]
And do not be [too] weary to write it, whether it is small or large, for its [specified] term.

ذَٰلِكُمْ أَقْسَطُ عِندَ ٱللَّهِ وَأَقْوَمُ لِلشَّهَٰدَةِ وَأَدْنَىٰٓ أَلَّا تَرْتَابُوٓا۟ ^{صلے}

[dhālikum ’aqsaṭu ‘inda l-lāhi wa’aqwamu lish-shahādati wa’adnā ’al-lā tartābū,]
That is more just in the sight of God Allāh and stronger as evidence and more likely to prevent doubt between you,

إِلَّآ أَن تَكُونَ تِجَٰرَةً حَاضِرَةً تُدِيرُونَهَا بَيْنَكُمْ فَلَيْسَ عَلَيْكُمْ جُنَاحٌ أَلَّا تَكْتُبُوهَا ^{قلے}

[’il-lā ’an takūna tijāratan ḥāḍiratan tudīrūnahā baynakum falaysa ‘alaykum junāḥun ’al-lā taktubūhā,]
except when it is an immediate transaction which you conduct among yourselves. For [then] there is no blame upon you if you do not write it.

وَأَشْهِدُوٓا۟ إِذَا تَبَايَعْتُمْ ^{ج}

[wa’ashhidū ’idhā tabāy‘tum,]
And take witnesses when you conclude a contract.

وَلَا يُضَآرَّ كَاتِبٌ وَلَا شَهِيدٌ ^{ج}

[walā yuḍār-ra kātibun walā shahīdun,]
Let no scribe be harmed or any witness.

وَإِن تَفْعَلُوا۟ فَإِنَّهُۥ فُسُوقٌۢ بِكُمْ ^{قلے}

[wa’in taf‘alū fa’in-nahū fusūqun bikum,]
For if you do so, indeed, it is [grave] disobedience in you.

وَٱتَّقُوا۟ ٱللَّهَ ^{صلے}

[wat-taqu l-lāh(a),]
And fear God Allāh.

وَيُعَلِّمُكُمُ ٱللَّهُ ^{قلے}

[wayu‘al-limukumu l-lāh(u),]
And God Allāh teaches you.

وَٱللَّهُ بِكُلِّ شَىْءٍ عَلِيمٌ ۝٢٨٢

[wal-lāhu bikul-li shay’in ‘alīm(un)]
And God (Allāh) is Knowing of all things.

=== Meaning ===
^{282} O you who believe! When you contract a debt for a fixed period, write it down. Let a scribe write it down in justice between you. Let not the scribe refuse to write as God (Allah) has taught him, so let him write. Let him (the debtor) who incurs the liability dictate, and he must fear God (Allah), his Lord, and diminish not anything of what he owes. But if the debtor is of poor understanding, or weak, or is unable himself to dictate, then let his guardian dictate in justice. And get two witnesses out of your own men. And if there are not two men (available), then a man and two women, such as you agree for witnesses, so that if one of them errs, the other can remind him or her. And the witnesses should not refuse when they are called on (for evidence). You should not become weary to write it (your contract), whether it be small or big, for its fixed term, that is more just with God (Allah); more solid as evidence, and more convenient to prevent doubts among yourselves, save when it is a present trade which you carry out on the spot among yourselves, then there is no sin on you if you do not write it down. But take witnesses whenever you make a commercial contract. Let neither scribe nor witness suffer any harm, but if you do (such harm), it would be wickedness in you. So be afraid of God (Allah); and God (Allah) teaches you. And God (Allah) is the All-Knower of each and everything.

Translation:Noble Quran, 1999

== See also ==
- Qard al-Hasan
- Verse of ikmal al-din
- Verse of wilaya
- Warning verse
- Verse of Brotherhood
- Verse of purification
- Muhammad in the Quran
- Verse of Evil Eye
- Verse of obedience
- Verse of mawadda
