= Verse of tabligh =

Quranic verse with contested meanings

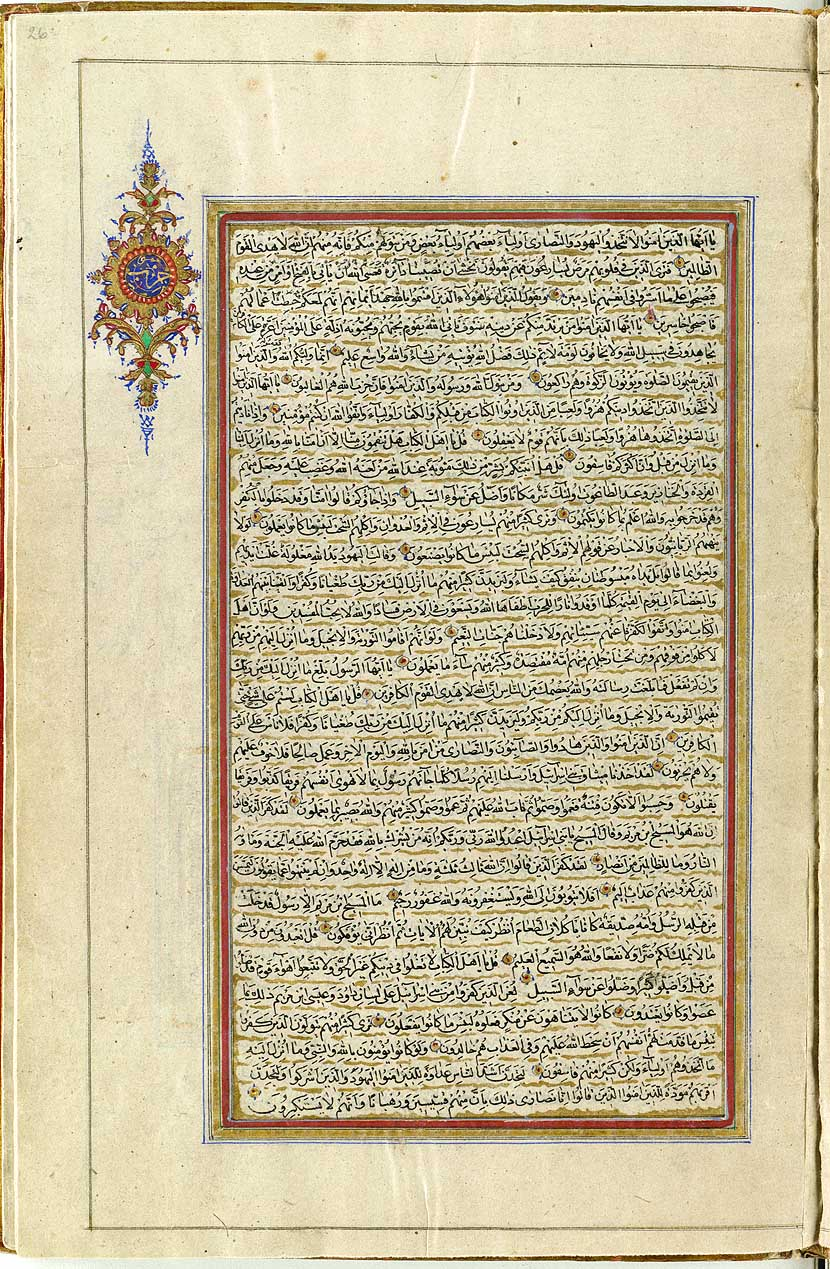
Verse of tabligh in a folio of Quran, dating to 1874

The Verse of tabligh (Arabic: آیة التَّبليغ, lit. 'verse of proclamation') refers to verse of 5:67 of the Quran, the central religious text of Islam, which reads

يَـٰٓأَيُّهَا ٱلرَّسُولُ بَلِّغْ مَآ أُنزِلَ إِلَيْكَ مِن رَّبِّكَ ۖ وَإِن لَّمْ تَفْعَلْ فَمَا بَلَّغْتَ رِسَالَتَهُۥ ۚ وَٱللَّهُ يَعْصِمُكَ مِنَ ٱلنَّاسِ ۗ إِنَّ ٱللَّهَ لَا يَهْدِى ٱلْقَوْمَ ٱلْكَـٰفِرِينَ
O Messenger! Convey that which has been sent down unto thee from thy Lord, and if thou dost not, thou wilt not have conveyed His message. And God will protect thee from mankind. Surely God guides not disbelieving people.

Among various Sunni views, this verse is sometimes connected to Muhammad's criticism of Jews and Christians, or viewed as evidence of his faithfulness in transmitting the divine revelations. In Shia Islam, this verse spurred Muhammad to deliver the announcement at Ghadir Khumm in 632 CE about his cousin and son-in-law Ali, which in Shia Islam signifies the divine investiture of Ali with the spiritual authority (Arabic: وَلاية, romanized: walaya) over Muslims.

== Background ==
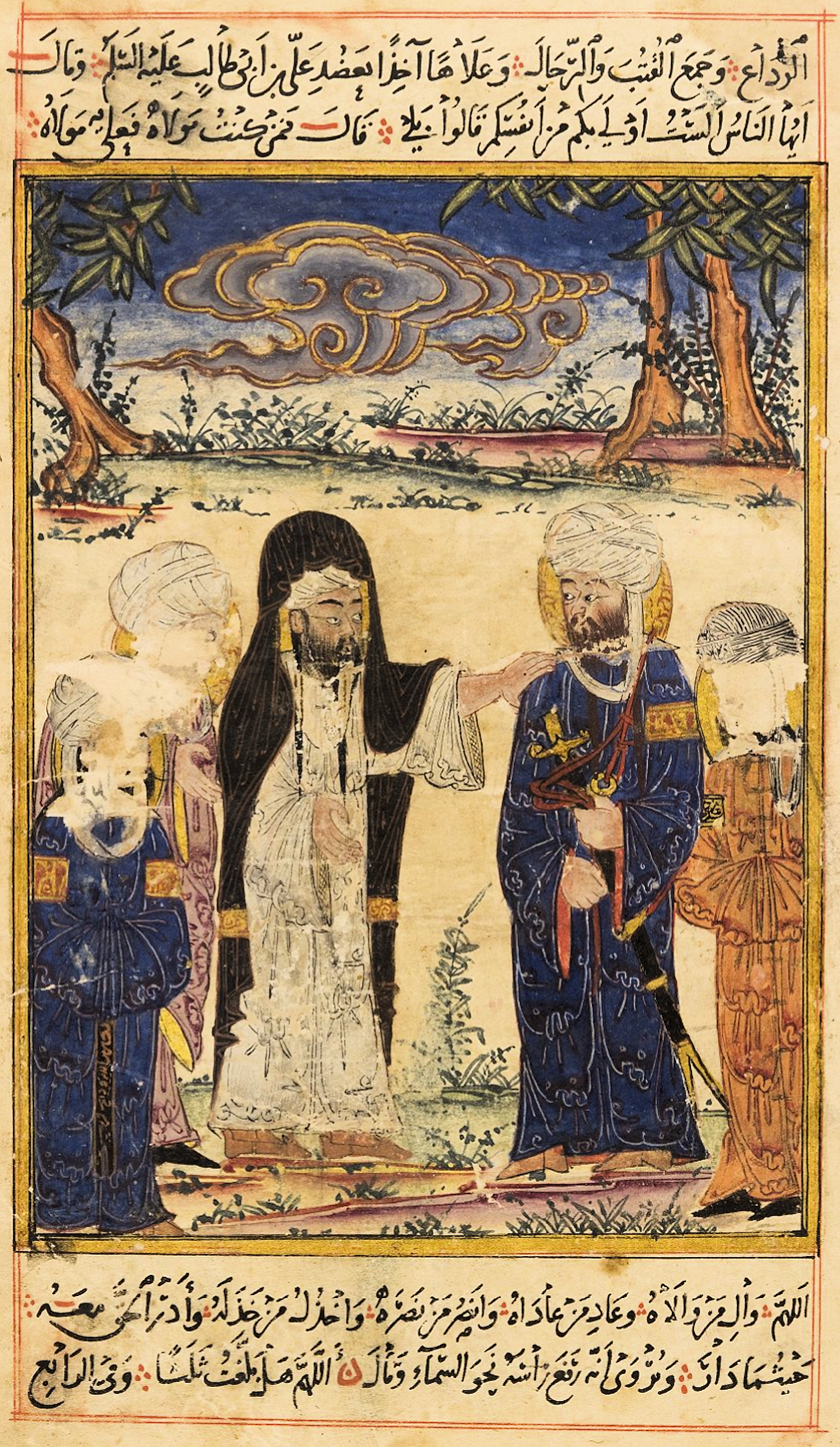
The Investiture of Ali at Ghadir Khumm in a fourteenth-century Ilkhanid copy of Chronology of Ancient Nations, illustrated by Ibn al-Kutbi

=== Farewell Pilgrimage ===
Shortly before he died in 632 CE, the Islamic prophet Muhammad performed the Hajj ritual in Mecca, which has become known as his Farewell Pilgrimage. In his sermon in Mecca at Arafat, and also later at the Ghadir Khumm by some accounts, he alerted Muslims about his impending death. On his return trip to Medina after performing the Hajj, Muhammad called the Muslim caravan to a halt at the Ghadir Khumm (Arabic: غَدِير خُم, lit. 'pond of Khumm').

=== Ghadir Khumm ===
There Muhammad gave a sermon in which he announced, "Anyone who has me as his mawla, has this Ali as his mawla," (Arabic: من كنت مولاه فهذا على مولاه) as reported by some canonical Sunni and Shia sources, including Musnad Ibn Hanbal and al-Ghadir. In particular, the former source adds that Muhammad repeated this statement three or four times and that his companion Umar congratulated Ali after the sermon, "You have now become mawla of every faithful man and woman."

=== Interpretations ===
While the authenticity of the Ghadir Khumm is rarely contested, the interpretation of the Arabic word mawla (Arabic: مولاه) is a source of controversy between Sunni and Shia. In this context, Shia sources interpret this word as meaning 'leader', 'master', or 'patron', and thus see the Ghadir Khumm as the appointment of Ali to succeed Muhammad on both the spiritual and temporal levels, while Sunni accounts of this sermon tend to offer little explanation or substitute the word wali (of God, lit. 'friend of God') in place of mawla. Sunni authors argue that Muhammad did not explicitly refer to Ali as his successor in his sermon, while the Shia writer Abdul Hosein Amini (d. 1970) enumerates the Sunni and Shia sources that corroborate the Shia interpretation in his multivolume al-Ghadir.

== Sunni view ==
Sunni scholars proffer various theories about the verse of tabligh. Possibly because the verse is placed in the context of a critical discussion of the People of the Book (adherents of earlier monotheistic faiths, ahl al-kitab), some Sunni authors conclude that Muhammad was hesitant to convey this criticism. Such is the view of al-Tabari (d. 923), a prominent Sunni exegete. Alternatively, the Sunni exegete al-Zamakhshari (d. 1144) suggests that the verse equates concealing any part of the divine revelations with concealing all of it and includes a tradition in which Muhammad is threatened with divine punishment in that case. A similar view is voiced by al-Baydawi (d. 1319), another Sunni exegete. Muhammad's wife Aisha may have considered this verse as evidence of his faithfulness in transmitting the divine revelations.

The promised protection in this verse has led some to conclude that Muhammad at times feared the reaction to his messages. A Sunni tradition alleges that Muhammad hid parts of the revelations in Mecca but was ordered by this verse to reveal them when the Muslim community strengthened. Yet other reports claim that Muhammad had bodyguards until the verse of tabligh assured his safety. Some other reports collected by the Sunni exegetes al-Tabari and al-Qurtubi (d. 1272) link this verse to the story of a Bedouin Arab who reportedly attempted to kill an unguarded Muhammad, although a similar explanation is also given for verse 5:11 of the Quran. Another Sunni view is that Muhammad was afraid of the Quraysh tribe.

A small number of Sunni commentators link this verse to the spiritual merits of Ali and the Ghadir Khumm, while some others link this verse to Muhammad's sermon at Arafat, a few days before the Ghadir Khumm. Similar to the Shia, these authors associate the verse of tabligh with the final directives issued by Muhammad.

== Shia view ==
Shia traditions relate the verse of tabligh to the Ghadir Khumm, stressing that Muhammad was concerned about implementing his divine instruction, fearing the reaction of some of his companions. It was only after the revelation of the verse of tabligh, which urged him to fulfill his task and ensured his safety, that Muhammad gave his sermon at the Ghadir Khumm. There he announced the spiritual authority (walaya) of Ali over Muslims, according to the Shia interpretation of the event. The divine instruction in question is specified as verse 5:55, also known as the verse of walaya, in a tradition attributed to the Shia imam Muhammad al-Baqir (d. c. 732).

The Shia exegete Muhammad H. Tabatabai (d. 1981) similarly notes that the verse of tabligh evidently refers to an announcement without which the prophetic mission would have failed. The verse also suggests that Muhammad had delayed that announcement, perhaps fearing opposition and awaiting suitable circumstances, until his safety was assured by the verse of tabligh. Therefore, he argues, this matter could have not been a regular religious injunction for withholding an injunction could not have destructed Islam. Nor did Muhammad fear anyone in preaching the Islamic injunctions. For Tabatabai, this all supports the Shia traditions that link the verse of tabligh to the Ghadir Khumm and the divine investiture of Ali with spiritual authority (walaya) over Muslims therein. The Islamic philosopher Hossein Nasr and his coauthors view as most plausible such a link between the verse of tabligh and the events that followed the Farewell Pilgrimage, including the Ghadir Khumm. Their justification is that chapter (sura) five of the Quran is often associated with Muhammad's final years in Medina, while verses 1–11 of this sura are specifically linked to the Farewell Pilgrimage by many authorities.

== See also ==
- Verse of ikmal al-din
- Verse of walaya
- Verse of purification
- Verse of obedience
- Verse of mawadda
