= Rashidun =

First four caliphs following the death of Muhammad

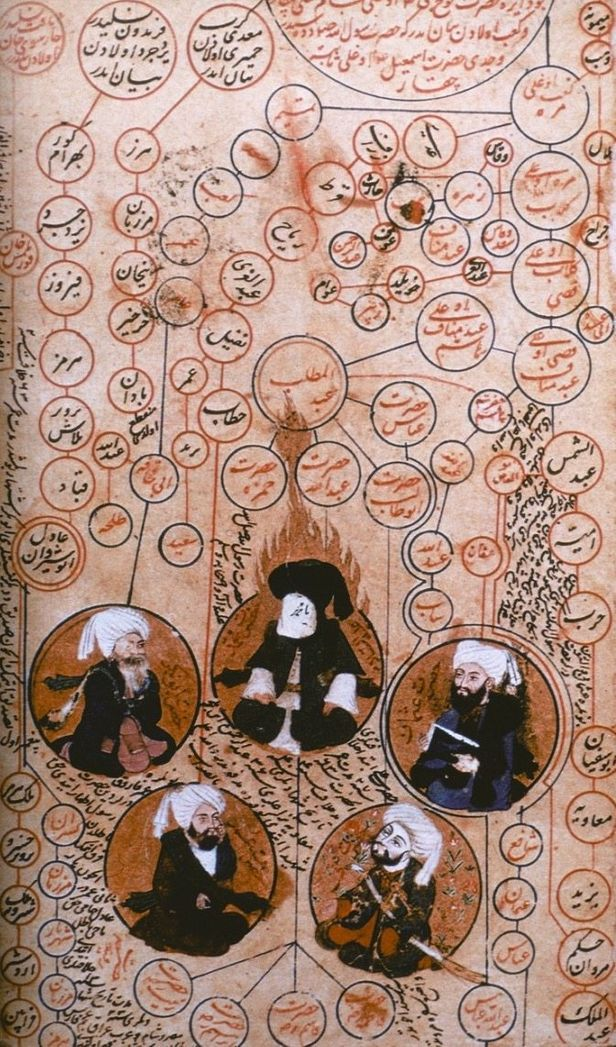
Ottoman miniature depicting Muhammad and the Rashidun Caliphs Abu Bakr, Umar, Uthman, and Ali. c. 16th century

The Rashidun (Arabic: الراشدون, romanized: al-Rāshidūn, lit. 'the rightly-guided') are the first four caliphs (lit. 'successors') who led the Muslim community following the death of the Islamic prophet Muhammad, namely Abu Bakr (r. 632–634), Umar (r. 634–644), Uthman (r. 644–656), and Ali (r. 656–661).

The reign of these caliphs, called the Rashidun Caliphate (632–661), is considered in Sunni Islam to have been 'rightly guided' (Arabic: rāshid), meaning that it constitutes a model (Sunnah) to be followed and emulated from a religious point of view. Shia Islam holds that only Ali was the rightful and designated successor of Muhammad.

== History ==
The first four caliphs who succeeded Muhammad are known as the Rashidun (rightly-guided) Caliphs.

1. Abd Allah ibn Abi Quhafa (c. 573–634; r. 632–634) – often known simply as Abu Bakr
2. Umar ibn al-Khattab (c. 583–644; r. 634–644) – often known simply as Umar or Omar
3. Uthman ibn Affan (c. 573–656; r. 644–656) – often known simply as Uthman, Othman, or Osman
4. Ali ibn Abi Talib (c. 600–661; r. 656–661) – often known simply as Ali

The succession to Muhammad is the central issue that divides the Muslim community. Sunni Islam, according to the author Carl Ernst, accepts the political status quo of their succession, regardless of its justice, whereas Shia Muslims largely reject the legitimacy of the first three caliphs, and maintain that Muhammad had appointed Ali as his successor.

=== Abu Bakr ===
Abd Allah ibn Abi Quhafa (Arabic: عبد الله بن أبي قحافة, romanized: ʿAbd Allāh ibn ʾAbī Quḥāfa), c. 573 CE unknown exact date 634/13 AH), better known by his kunya Abu Bakr (Arabic: أَبُو بَكْرٍ), was a senior companion of Muhammad (sahabah) and his father-in-law. He ruled over the Rashidun Caliphate from 632 to 634 CE when he became the first Muslim Caliph following Muhammad's death. As caliph, Abu Bakr continued the political and administrative functions previously exercised by Muhammad. Abu Bakr was called As-Siddiq (Arabic: اَلـصِّـدِّيْـق, "The Truthful"), and was known by that title among later generations of Sunni Muslims. He prevented the recently converted Muslims from dispersing, kept the community united, and consolidated Islamic grip on the region by containing the Ridda, while extending the Dar Al Islam all the way to the Red Sea.

=== Umar ===
Umar ibn al-Khattab (Arabic: عمر ابن الخطاب, romanized: ʿUmar ibn al-Khattāb, c. 586–590 – 644) c. 2 November (Dhu al-Hijjah 26, 23 Hijri) was a leading companion and adviser to Muhammad. His daughter Hafsa bint Umar was married to Muhammad; thus he became Muhammad's father-in-law. He became the second Muslim caliph after Muhammad's death and ruled for 10 years. He succeeded Abu Bakr on 23 August 634 as the second caliph, and played a significant role in Islam. Under Umar the Islamic empire expanded at an unprecedented rate, ruling the whole Sassanid Persian Empire and more than two thirds of the Eastern Roman Empire. His legislative abilities, firm political and administrative control over a rapidly expanding empire, and brilliantly coordinated multi-prong attacks against the Sassanid Persian Empire resulted in the conquest of the Persian empire in less than two years. This marked his reputation as a great political and military leader. Among his conquests are Jerusalem, Damascus, and Egypt. He was killed in 644 by a Persian captive named Abu Lu'lu'a Firuz.

=== Uthman ===
Uthman ibn Affan (Arabic: عثمان ابن عفان, romanized: ʿUthmān ibn ʿAffān) (c. 579 – 17 June 656) was one of the early companions and son in law of Muhammad. Two of Muhammad and Khadija daughters Ruqayyah and Umm Kulthum were married to him one after another. Uthman was born into the Umayyad clan of Mecca, a powerful family of the Quraysh tribe. He became caliph at the age of 70. Under his leadership, the empire expanded into Fars (present-day Iran) in 650 and some areas of Khorasan (present-day Afghanistan) in 651, and the conquest of Armenia was begun in the 640s. His rule ended when he was assassinated.

Uthman is perhaps best known for forming the committee which was tasked with producing copies of the Quran based on text that had been gathered separately on parchment, bones and rocks during the lifetime of Muhammad and also on a copy of the Quran that had been collated by Abu Bakr and left with Muhammad's widow after Abu Bakr's death. The committee members were also reciters of the Quran and had memorised the entire text during the lifetime of Muhammad. This work was undertaken due to the vast expansion of Islam under Uthman's rule, which encountered many different dialects and languages. This had led to variant readings of the Quran for those converts who were not familiar with the language. After clarifying any possible errors in pronunciation or dialects, Uthman sent copies of the sacred text to each of the Muslim cities and garrison towns, and destroyed variant texts.

=== Ali ===
Ali ibn Abi Talib (Arabic: علي ابن أبي طالب, romanized: ʿAlī ibn Abī Ṭālib) was Muhammad's cousin and son-in-law. In Mecca, a young Ali was the first or second male to embrace Islam and the person who offered his support when Muhammad first presented Islam to his relatives. Later, he facilitated Muhammad's safe escape to Medina by risking his life as the decoy. In Medina, Ali swore a pact of brotherhood with Muhammad and later took the hand of Muhammad's daughter, Fatimah, in marriage. Ali commonly acted as Muhammad's secretary in Medina, and served as his deputy during the expedition of Tabuk. Ali is often considered the most able warrior in Muhammad's army and the two were the only Muslim men who represented Islam against a Christian delegation from Najran. Ali's role in the collection of the Quran, the central text of Islam, is deemed as one of his key contributions. The fourth successive Rashidun in Sunni Islam, Ali is considered in Shia Islam however as the direct rightful successor of Muhammad, whose appointment was announced at the event of Ghadir Khumm and earlier in his prophetic mission.

Shortly after Uthman's assassination in Medina, the crowds turned to Ali for leadership and were turned down initially. The explanation of Will Durant for Ali's initial reluctance is that, "Genial and charitable, meditative and reserved; he [Ali] shrank from drama in which religion had been displaced by politics, and devotion by intrigue." In the absence of any serious opposition and urged particularly by the Ansar and the Iraqi delegations, Ali eventually took up the mantle on 25th of Dhu al-Hijjah, 656 CE, and Muslims filled the Prophet's Mosque and its courtyard to pledge their allegiance to him.

It has been suggested that Ali inherited the grave internal problems of Uthman's reign. After his appointment as the caliph, Ali transferred his capital from Medina to Kufa, the Muslim garrison city in the present-day Iraq. Ali also dismissed most of Uthman's governors whom he considered corrupt, including Muawiya, Uthman's cousin. Under a lenient Uthman, Muawiya had built a parallel power structure in Damascus that, according to Madelung, mirrored the despotism of the Roman Byzantine empire. Muawiya defied Ali's orders and, once the negotiations failed, the two sides engaged in a bloody and lengthy civil war, which is known as the First Fitnah.

After Ali's assassination in 661 CE at the mosque of Kufa, his son, Hasan, was elected caliph and adopted a similar approach towards Muawiya. However, as Muawiya began to buy the loyalties of military commanders and tribal chiefs, Hasan's military campaign suffered defections in large numbers. After a failed assassination attempt on his life, a wounded Hasan ceded the caliphate to Muawiya.

== Military expansion ==
The Rashidun Caliphate greatly expanded Islam beyond Arabia, conquering all of Persia, Syria (637), Armenia (639), Egypt (639) and Cyprus (654).

== Social policies ==
During his reign, Abu Bakr established the Bayt al-Mal (state treasury). Umar expanded the treasury and established a government building to administer the state finances.

Upon conquest, in almost all cases, the caliphs were burdened with the maintenance and construction of roads and bridges in return for the conquered nation's political loyalty.

=== Civil activities ===
Civil welfare in Islam started in the form of the construction and purchase of wells. During the caliphate, the Muslims repaired many of the aging wells in the lands they conquered.

In addition to wells, the Muslims built many tanks and canals. Many canals were purchased, and new ones constructed. While some canals were excluded for the use of monks (such as a spring purchased by Talhah), and the needy, most canals were open to general public use. Some canals were constructed between settlements, such as the Saad canal that provided water to Anbar, and the Abi Musa Canal to provide water to Basra.

During a famine, Umar ibn al-Khattab ordered the construction of a canal in Egypt connecting the Nile with the sea. The purpose of the canal was to facilitate the transport of grain to Arabia through a sea-route, hitherto transported only by land. The canal was constructed within a year by 'Amr ibn al-'As, and Abdus Salam Nadiv writes that "Arabia was rid of famine for all the times to come."

After four floods hit Mecca after Muhammad's death, Umar ordered the construction of two dams to protect the Kaaba. He also constructed a dam near Medina to protect its fountains from flooding.

=== Settlements ===
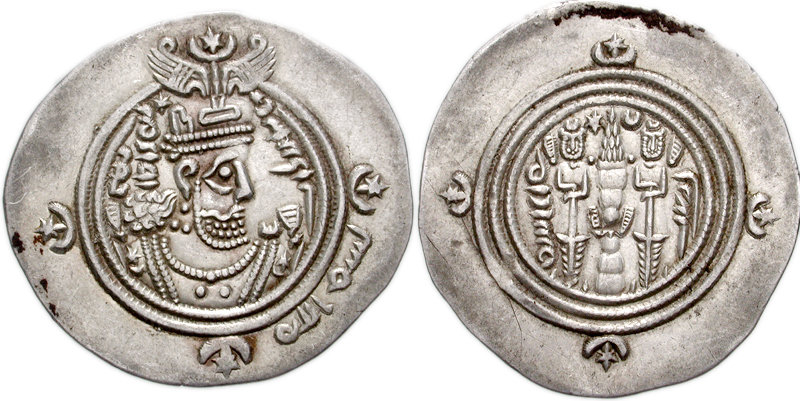
Islamic coin, time of the Rashidun. Imitation of Sasanid Empire ruler Khosrau II type. BYS (Bishapur) mint. Dated YE 25 = AH 36 (AD 656). Sasanian style bust imitating Khosrau II right; bismillah in margin/ Fire altar with ribbons and attendants; star and crescent flanking flames; date to left, mint name to right.

The area of Basra was very sparsely populated when it was conquered by the Muslims. During the reign of Umar, the Muslim army found it a suitable place to construct a base. Later the area was settled and a mosque was erected.

Upon the conquest of Madyan, it was settled by Muslims. However, soon the environment was considered harsh, and Umar ordered the resettlement of the 40,000 settlers to Kufa. The new buildings were constructed from mud bricks instead of reeds, a material that was popular in the region, but caught fire easily.

During the conquest of Egypt the area of Fustat was used by the Muslim army as a base. Upon the conquest of Alexandria, the Muslims returned and settled in the same area. Initially the land was primarily used for pasture, but later buildings were constructed.

Other already populated areas were greatly expanded. At Mosul, Arfaja al-Bariqi, at the command of Umar, constructed a fort, a few churches, a mosque and a locality for the Jewish population.

== Religious significance ==
The first four caliphs are particularly significant to modern intra-Islamic debates: for Sunni Muslims, they are models of righteous rule; for Shia Muslims, the first three of the four were usurpers. Accepted traditions of both Sunni and Shia Muslims detail disagreements and tensions between the four rightly guided caliphs. The Nizari Ismailis on the other hand, have come to accept the caliphates of Abu Bakr, Umar, and Uthman in the modern times under the leadership and teachings of the Aga Khans, even though polemics against those early caliphs were prevalent during the Fatimid period. For instance, the Fatimid Ismaili Imam-Caliph Al-Hakim bi Amr Allah ordered the public cursing of the first three caliphs in the year 1005 in Cairo.

=== Sunni view ===
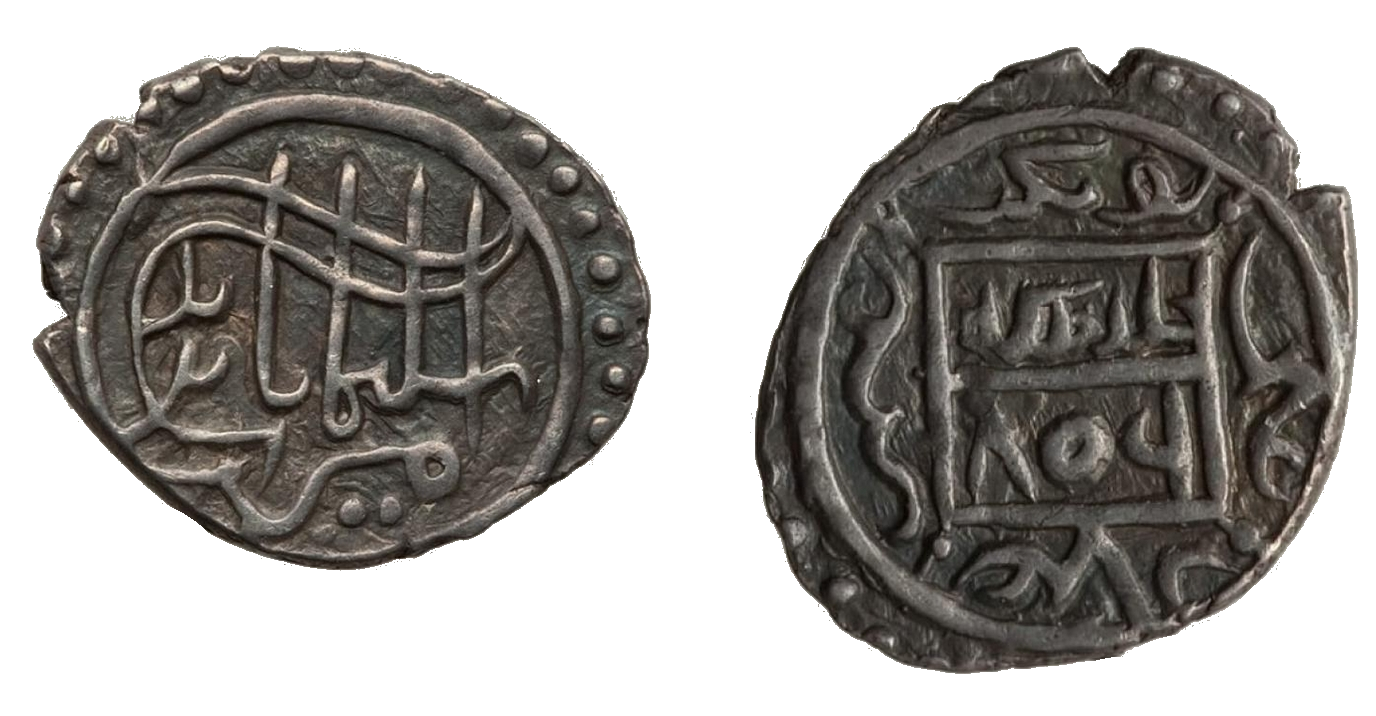
1404 AD dated akçe minted by Süleyman Çelebi (a claimant to the Ottoman throne) having names of the Rashidun caliphs on the obverse (right)

In Sunni Islam, the application of the label 'rightly-guided' to the first caliphs signifies their status as models whose actions and opinions (Arabic: sunna) should be followed and emulated from a religious point of view. In this sense, they are both 'rightly-guided' and 'rightly-guiding': the religious narratives about their lives serve as a guide to right belief.

They were all close companions of Muhammad, and his relatives: the daughters of Abu Bakr and Umar, Aisha and Hafsa respectively, were married to Muhammad, and two of Muhammad's daughters Ruqayyah, Umm Kulthum were married to Uthman and another daughter Fatimah to Ali. Likewise, their succession was not hereditary, something that would become the custom after them, beginning with the subsequent Umayyad Caliphate. Council decision or caliph's choice determined the successor originally.

The Sunni have long viewed the period of the Rashidun as an exemplary system of governance—based upon Islamic righteousness and merit—which they seek to emulate.

At the same time, it has been noted that the domination of Arabs over non-Arabs on an ethnic basis during Umar's reign and the widespread nepotism of Uthman's caliphate are in essential conflict with the call of Islam.

==== Fifth Rashidun caliph hypotheses ====
During the eighth and ninth centuries, there was a diversity of opinions about which caliphs were rāshidūn. After the ninth century, however, the first four caliphs became canonical as rāshid in Sunni Islam. The Umayyad caliph Umar ibn Abd al-Aziz (r. 717–720) was cited as a fifth rāshid caliph by the Sunni hadith collector Abu Dawud al-Sijistani (d. 889). Another hypothesis may have included Hasan ibn Ali (c. 625–670) as a fifth rāshid caliph, because his six-month reign was needed to complete a thirty-year period after Abu Bakr's ascension, which was predicted by Muhammad in a Sunni hadith as the length of the prophetic succession. This is also implied by Abu Dawud al-Tayalisi's version of this hadith, which avoided counting Hasan as the fifth rāshid caliph by adding six months to Umar's caliphate. The Islamist religious scholar and historian Ali al-Sallabi regards Hasan as a rāshid caliph, citing the fact that some Sunni scholars such as Ibn Kathir (c. 1300–1373) and Ibn Hajar al-Haytami (1503–1566) also held this view.

=== Shia view ===
The (Twelver) Shia view is that, similar to the past prophets in the Quran, the succession to Muhammad was settled by divine appointment, rather than by consensus, and that God chose Muhammad's successor from his family. In particular, Muhammad announced his cousin and son-in-law, Ali, as his rightful successor shortly before his death at the event of Ghadir Khumm and on other occasions, e.g., at the event of Dhul Asheera. As with the faith itself, the faithful were endowed with the free will not to follow Ali, to their own disadvantage. In the Shia view, while direct revelation ended with Muhammad's death, Ali remained the righteous guide or Imam towards God, similar to the successors of the past prophets in the Quran. After Muhammad's death, Ali inherited Muhammad's divine knowledge and his authority to correctly interpret the Quran, especially its allegorical and metaphorical verses (mutashabihat).

In the Shia view, since the time of the first prophet, Adam, the earth has never remained without an Imam, in the form of prophets and their divinely appointed successors. Likewise, the Imamate was passed on from Ali to the next Imam, Hasan, by divinely inspired designation (nass). After Hasan's death, Husayn and nine of his descendants are the Shia Imams, the last of whom, Muhammad al-Mahdi, went into occultation in 260 AH, due to the hostility of his enemies and the danger to his life. In his absence, the vacuum in the Shia leadership is partly filled by marjaiyya and, more recently, by wilayat al-faqqih, i.e., guardianship of the Islamic jurist.

At some points in history, Shia Muslims engaged in ritual cursing of the first three caliphs. This practice was particularly prominent in Safavid Iran and was a cause of lasting tension between the country and its Sunni neighbors.

While the Ismaili Shi'ites accept a closely related understanding of Imamate as the Twelver Shia, the Ismailis under the leadership of the Aga Khans do recognize the caliphates of the first three caliphs before Ali while distinguishing Imamate as a separate office apart from the Caliphate:

In the present Imamat the final reconciliation between the Shia and Sunni doctrines has been publicly proclaimed by myself on exactly the same lines as Hazrat Aly did at the death of the Prophet and during the first thirty years after that. The political and worldly Khalifat was accepted by Hazrat Aly in favour of the three first Khalifs voluntarily and with goodwill for the protection of the interests of the Muslims throughout the world. We Ismailis now in the same spirit accept the Khalifat of the first Khalifs and such other Khalifs as during the last thirteen centuries helped the cause of Islam, politically, socially and from a worldly point of view. On the other hand, the Spiritual Imamat remained with Hazrat Aly and remains with his direct descendants always alive till the day of Judgement.

— Aga Khan III: Selected Speeches and Writings of Sir Sultan Muhammad Shah, p. 1417

== Timeline ==
Note that a caliph's succession does not necessarily occur on the first day of the new year.

== See also ==
- Glossary of Islam
- Outline of Islam
- Index of Islam-related articles
- Hadith of the ten promised paradise
- The Four Companions

== Notes ==
=== Bibliography ===
- Abbas, Hassan (2021). The Prophet's Heir: The life of Ali ibn Abi Talib. Yale University Press. ISBN 9780300252057.
- Hazleton, Lesley (2009). After the prophet : the epic story of the Shia-Sunni split in Islam (1st ed.). New York: Doubleday. ISBN 978-0-385-52393-6. OCLC 310714958.
- Hazleton, Lesley (2013). The first Muslim : the story of Muhammad. London: Atlantic Books. ISBN 9781782392293.
- Ibn al-Adawi, Abu Abd Allah Mustafa, ed. (2008). al-Ṣawāʿiq al-Muḥriqa fī al-Radd ʿalā Ahl al-Bidʿ wa-l-Zandaqa, taʾlīf Shihāb al-Dīn Aḥmad ibn Ḥajar al-Makkī al-Haytamī. Cairo: Maktabat Fayyāḍ.
- Madelung, Wilferd (1997). The succession to Muḥammad : a study of the early Caliphate. Cambridge. ISBN 0-521-56181-7. OCLC 33443482.
- Melchert, Christopher (2020). "The Rightly Guided Caliphs: The Range of Views Preserved in Ḥadīth". In al-Sarhan, Saud (ed.). Political Quietism in Islam: Sunni and Shi'i Practice and Thought. London and New York: I.B. Tauris. pp. 63–79. ISBN 978-1-83860-765-4.
- Nadvi, Abdus Salam (2000). The ways of the Sahabah. Karachi: Darul Ishaat. Translated by Muhammad Yunus Qureshi.
- al-Sallabi, Ali M. (2014). Khattab, Huda (ed.). Al-Hasan Ibn Ali: His Life and Times. Translated by Khattab, Nasiruddin (English 1 ed.). Riyadh: International Islamic Publishing House. ISBN 9786035012133.
- al-Turki, Abd Allah, ed. (1998). al-Bidāya wa-l-Nihāya, li-l-ḥāfiẓ ʿImād al-Dīn Abī al-Fidāʾ Ismāʿīl ibn ʿUmar ibn Kathīr al-Qurashī al-Dimashqī (in Arabic). Vol. 11. Dār Hajar.
