= Al-Hujurat =

49th chapter of the Quran

Surah 49 of the Quran
الحجرات Al-Ḥujurāt The Private Apartments
- Qira'ah; English text
- Classification: Medinan
- Position: Juzʼ 26
- No. of verses: 18
- No. of Rukus: 2
- No. of words: 353
- No. of letters: 1533

Al-Hujurat (Arabic: الحُجُرات, al-ḥujurāt meaning: The Chambers) is the 49th chapter (surah) of the Quran with 18 verses (āyāt). The chapter contains etiquette and norms to be observed in the Muslim community, including the proper conduct towards the Islamic prophet, Muhammad, an injunction against acting on news without verification, a call for peace and reconciliation, as well as injunctions against defamation, suspicion, and backbiting. The chapter also declares a universal brotherhood among Muslims. The thirteenth verse, one of the most famous in the Quran, is understood by Muslim scholars to establish equality with regard to race and origin; only God can determine one's nobility based on his piety.

The chapter is a Medinan sura, revealed in the year 9 AH (630 CE) when the nascent Islamic state under the leadership of Muhammad had extended to most of Arabia. Muslim historians linked some of the verses (either verses 2–5 or just 4–5) to the conduct of a Banu Tamim delegation to Muhammad in Medina. The chapter reprimands the delegates' behavior and then lays down protocol when interacting with Muhammad.

== Summary ==
- 1-5 The Prophet of God to be treated with honour and respect
- 6-8 Believers warned against misrepresenting any matter to the Prophet
- 9 10 11 The duty of peacemaking enjoined
- 11-13 Sundry faults of the Muslims exposed
- 14-18 Bedouin Arabs rebuked and warned on account of hypocrisy

In general, the chapter addresses the growing Muslim community and establishes norms to be observed within it.

=== Proper conduct towards Muhammad ===
Verses 1 to 5 focus on the etiquette towards Muhammad, including lowering one's tone in his presence and respecting the privacy of his chambers.

=== Unity and brotherhood within the Muslim community ===
The following verses (6—12) emphasise the ties of brotherhood within the Muslim community (ummah) and establish social principles to maintain its unity. Verses 6 to 8 call on Muslims to not act on news before verifying its authenticity. The following two verses encourage promoting peace and reconciling quarreling parties within the community. The tenth verse is known as the Verse of Brotherhood and instructs Muslims to unite in a universal brotherhood. The next verse, verse 11, warns the members of the community against defamation, mocking and name-calling. Verse 12 calls for Muslims to avoid suspicion (zann, also translated "conjecture"), spying on others to find faults (tajassus), and backbiting (ghibah). The Quran considers backbiting (slandering someone in their absence) so sinful and abhorrent that it is compared to "eating the flesh of [one's] brother".

=== Equality of mankind ===
Verse 13 is one of the most famous verses of the Quran:

O mankind, surely We have created you from a male and a female, and made you tribes and families that you may know each other. Surely the noblest of you with Allah is the most dutiful of you. Surely Allah is Knowing, Aware.

Commentators on the Quran, including Abul A'la Maududi and Sayyid Qutb, argued that this verse declares the equality of humankind. Humankind is spread around the world and has different nations and tribes to know each other, and no one is superior based on color, race, or origin. According to the verse, only taqwa (piety, fear of God) makes one nobler before God. According to the commentary of The Study Quran, this verse marked a reform of the moral order in Arabia, where previously one's worth had been determined by "lineage and grandiose displays of valor and generosity" and where fear of God had been seen as the opposite of nobility, to one which focused on "the depth of faith and piety".

=== Nature of faith ===
The remaining verses (14 to 18) contain clarifications on the Quranic view of faith. Verse 14 indicates degrees of faith: Islam (submission) and the higher iman (belief). According to verse 15, a true believer believes in God and Muhammad without doubt, and proves it through devotion and the spending of one's wealth in the way of God. The chapter closes by saying that only God knows the real extent of one's faith.

== History ==
According to most scholars of the Islamic tradition, the chapter was revealed in late Medinan period, therefore, it is a Medinan sura. It is most likely revealed in 630 CE (or 9 AH), after the Conquest of Mecca and when Muhammad already ruled most of Arabia. A minority opinion, including that of the exegete Mahmud al-Alusi, says that the thirteenth verse was revealed in the Meccan period. The traditional Egyptian chronology puts the chapter as the 106th chapter by the order of revelation (after Al-Mujadila), while the Nöldeke Chronology (by the orientalist Theodor Nöldeke) puts it as the 112th.

Muslim historians, such as Al-Waqidi and Ibn Ishaq, linked the revelation of several verses to the conduct of a delegation from the Banu Tamim when they were in Medina to meet with Muhammad. According to Al-Waqidi, the Tamimites were negotiating the release of Tamimite prisoners in Muhammad's custody, while according to Ibn Ishaq they were challenging Muhammad to a mufakhara (a boasting contest, a pre-Islamic Arabian practice). As Muhammad was sleeping, they went through the private apartments of Muhammad and his wives to seek him out. Verses 2–4 (according to Al-Waqidi) or verse 4 (Ibn Ishaq) of this chapter describe the Tamimites' behavior, while verse 5 reprimands it and instructs Muslims to be patient when seeking audience with Muhammad. Al-Waqidi dated this event as month of Muharram 9 AH, while Ibn Ishaq's account implied that it had happened in Ramadan 9 AH or later.

== Name ==
The chapter is named after the word Al-Hujurat (The Private Apartments) which appeared in the fourth verse. Verses 4 and 5 instructed the Muslims to not enter the private apartments of Muhammad—at this point the ruler of most of Arabia—or his wives to search for or petition him.

The word al-hujurat is the plural and definite form of hujrah which translates as room, compartment of chamber. Verse 4 of this chapter is the only use of this word in the Quran, and due to this uniqueness, the chapter is named after it.

== Bibliography ==
- Abul Kalam Muhammad Shahed; Noor Muhammad Osmani; Muhammad Abu Bakr Siddique (2015). "Surah al-Hujurat: A Charter of Ideal Social Life" (PDF). Bangladesh Journal of Islamic Thought. 11 (16): 1–20. ISSN 1816-689X.
- Al-Dargazelli, Shetha (2013). The Names of the Qur'anic Chapters. The Other Press. ISBN 978-967-5062-93-3.
- Ebrahim, Rahim (1996). Major Themes in Surat Al-Hujurat (Chapter 49 of the Qur'an) (PDF) (M. A.). University of Durban-Westville.
- Ernst, Carl W. (5 December 2011). How to Read the Qur'an: A New Guide, with Select Translations. Univ of North Carolina Press. ISBN 978-0-8078-6907-9.
- Landau-Tasseron, Ella (1986). "Processes of Redaction: The Case of the Tamīmite Delegation to the Prophet Muḥammad". Bulletin of the School of Oriental and African Studies. 49 (2): 253–270. doi:10.1017/s0041977x00024150. JSTOR 618597.
- Seyyed Hossein Nasr; Caner K. Dagli; Maria Massi Dakake; Joseph E.B. Lumbard; Mohammed Rustom, eds. (2015). The Study Quran: A New Translation and Commentary. New York, NY: HarperCollins. ISBN 978-0-06-112586-7.
- Wherry, Elwood Morris (1896). A Complete Index to Sale's Text, Preliminary Discourse, and Notes. London: Kegan Paul, Trench, Trubner, and Co. This article incorporates text from this source, which is in the public domain.
