= Verse of Ikmal ad-Din =

Verse of the Qur'an

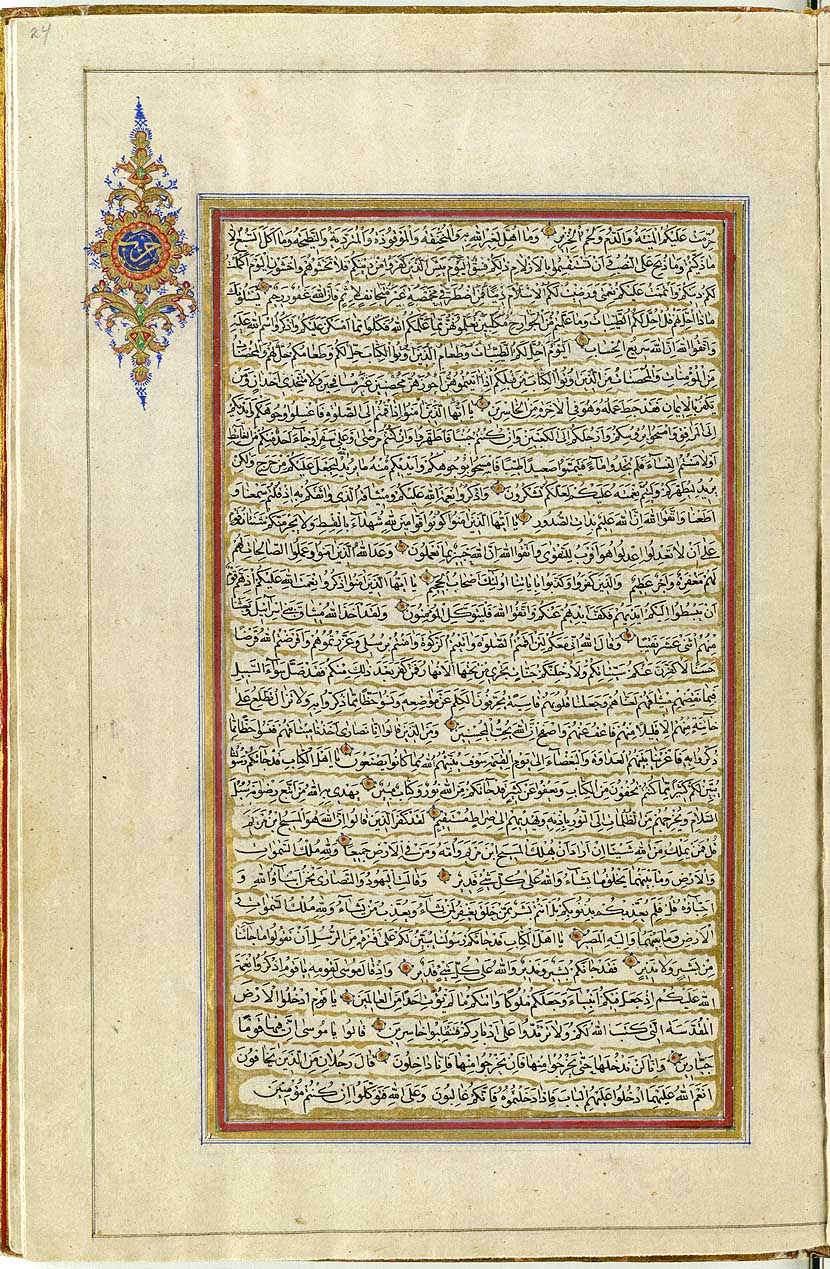
A folio of the Quran, beginning with the Verse of Ikmal, from a manuscript that dates to 1874.

The Verse of Ikmal ad-Din (Arabic: إِکْمَال الدِّيْن, lit. 'Perfection of the Religion') or the Verse of Ikmal refers to verse 5:3 of the Quran, the central religious text of Islam:

ٱلْيَوْمَ يَئِسَ ٱلَّذِينَ كَفَرُوا۟ مِن دِينِكُمْ فَلَا تَخْشَوْهُمْ وَٱخْشَوْنِ ۚ ٱلْيَوْمَ أَكْمَلْتُ لَكُمْ دِينَكُمْ وَأَتْمَمْتُ عَلَيْكُمْ نِعْمَتِى وَرَضِيتُ لَكُمُ ٱلْإِسْلَـٰمَ دِينًۭا ۚ
This day those who disbelieve have despaired of your religion. So fear them not, but fear Me! This day I have perfected for you your religion, and completed My blessing upon you, and have approved for you as religion, submission [to God] (Islam).

Shia authorities are nearly unanimous that the verse of ikmal was revealed following the announcement of Muhammad about Ali at the Ghadir Khumm, after his Farewell Pilgrimage and shortly before his death in 632 CE. In Shia sources, Muhammad received this revelation following his designation of Ali at Ghadir Khumm to lead the Muslim community after him.

Sunni sources offer different views, chief among them is that this verse was revealed to Muhammad during his Farewell Pilgrimage to signal the completion of Islamic legislation. However, Some Sunni sources also associate the verse of ikmal with the Ghadir Khumm, but reject its Shia significance.

== Background ==
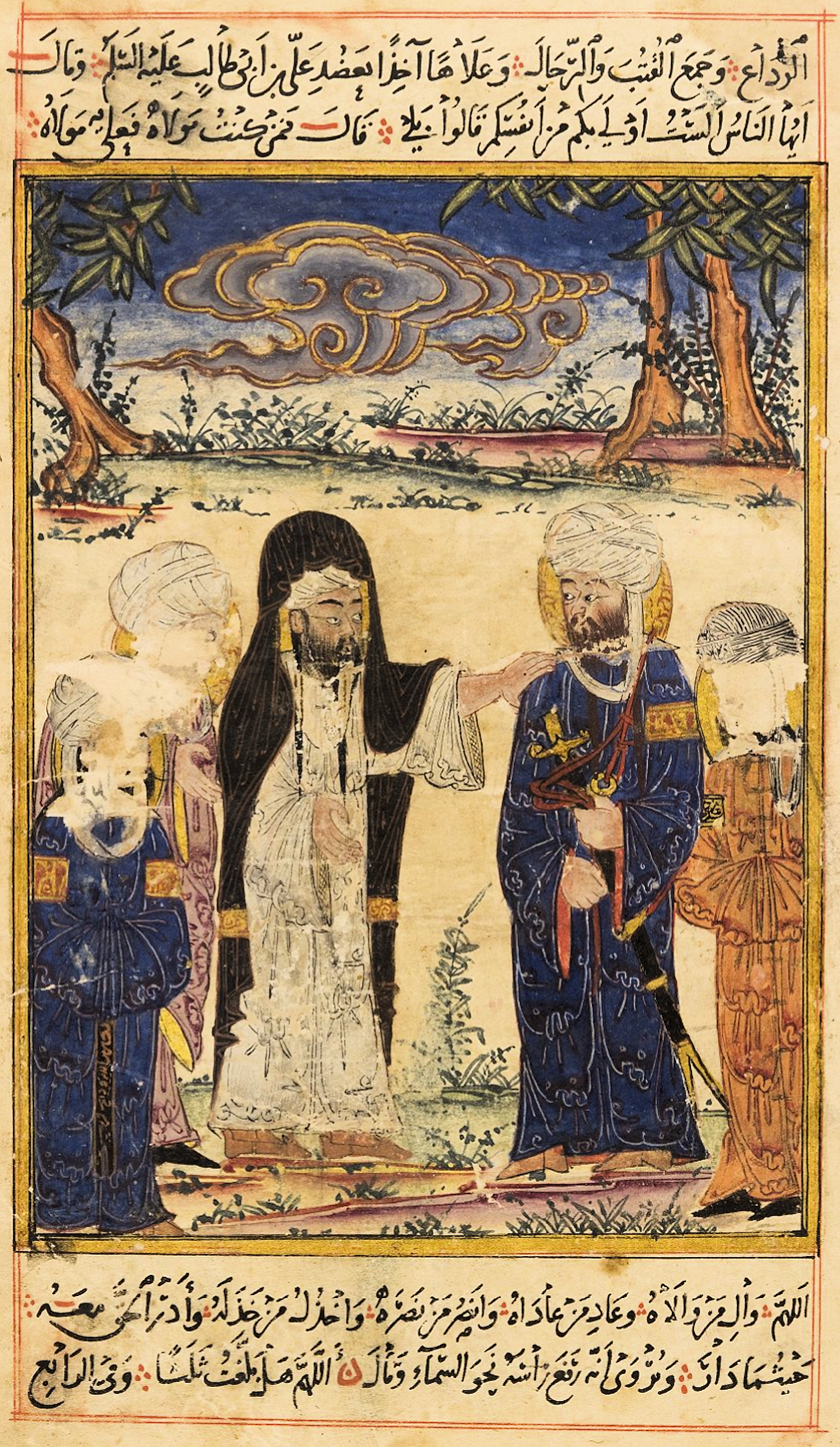
The Investiture of Ali at Ghadir Khumm in the fourteenth-century Ilkhanid copy of al-Biruni's The Remaining Signs of Past Centuries, illustrated by Ibn al-Kutbi

=== Farewell Pilgrimage ===
Shortly before he died in 632, the Islamic prophet Muhammad performed the Hajj in Mecca, which has become known as his Farewell Pilgrimage. In his sermon in Mecca at Mount Arafat, and also later at Ghadir Khumm by some accounts, he alerted Muslims about his impending death. On his return trip to Medina after performing the Hajj, Muhammad called the caravan to a halt at Ghadir Khumm (lit. 'pond of Khumm').

=== Ghadir Khumm ===
There Muhammad gave a sermon in which he announced, "Anyone who has me as his mawla, has this Ali as his mawla," as reported by some canonical Sunni and Shia sources, including Musnad Ibn Hanbal and al-Ghadir. In particular, the former source adds that Muhammad repeated this statement three or four times and that his companion Umar congratulated Ali after the sermon, "You have now become mawla of every faithful man and woman."

=== Interpretations ===
While the authenticity of the Ghadir Khumm is rarely contested, the interpretation of the Arabic word mawla is a source of controversy between Sunni and Shia. In this context, Shia sources interpret this word as meaning 'leader', 'master', or 'patron', and thus see the Ghadir Khumm as the appointment of Ali to succeed Muhammad on both the spiritual and temporal levels, while Sunni accounts of this sermon tend to offer little explanation or substitute the word wali (of God, lit. 'friend of God') in place of mawla. Sunni authors argue that Muhammad did not explicitly refer to Ali as his successor in his sermon, while the Shia writer Abdul Hosein Amini (d. 1970) enumerates the Sunni and Shia sources that corroborate the Shia interpretation in his multivolume al-Ghadir.

== Sunni view ==
Sunni scholars proffer various views about when or why the verse of Ikmal was revealed to Muhammad. The majority view is that Muhammad received this verse after his sermon at Arafat during his Farewell Pilgrimage in 632. This verdict is also accepted by the Islamicist Theodor Nöldeke (d. 1930). Some other Sunni reports imply that the verse was revealed first during the Farewell Pilgrimage and then again at the Ghadir Khumm. Such reports are given by the Sunni scholars al-Tabari (d. 923), al-Baghdadi (d. 1071), and Ibn al-Jawzi (d. 1201). Alternatively, the verse of ikmal is linked to the 629–630 Conquest of Mecca by the Sunni jurist al-Qurtubi (d. 1273) in his exegesis. At any rate, disbelievers on that day lost hope of turning Muslims away from their faith, according to al-Tabari and al-Qurtubi.

The perfection of Islam and the completion of blessing in the verse are interpreted as the banishment of idolatry from the pilgrimage in some reports by al-Tabari and al-Zamakhshari (d. 1144), another Sunni exegete. Here, al-Tabari rejects the Shia view by presenting opposite traditions, which he attributes to Ibn Abbas (d. c. 687), a key Shia figure, but also takes the unusual step of including his own verdict. Some other Sunni commentators view the perfection of Islam and the completion of blessing as a reference to the rites of Hajj which were established by Muhammad in his Farewell Pilgrimage. Alternatively, one of the interpretations offered by the Sunni theologian al-Baydawi (d. 1319) is that God perfected his religion by the victory of Islam on that day over all other religions. In his view, this victory may readily complete the blessings of God. Yet for others, the verse of ikmal signifies the completion of revelation, although there also exist other candidates for the last verse of the Quran, namely, verses 2:281, 4:176, 9:128-9, 110:1-3. This is refined by al-Tabari and al-Zamakhshari, who explain that no ritual or legal ruling was revealed after the verse of ikmal, while al-Qurtubi asserts that Muhammad did receive some legal but no ritual injunctions after this verse. This last view that the perfection of religion in the verse corresponds to the completion of the Islamic legislation is common among Sunnis, although a Shia criticism of this view is that some legal injunctions about riba were allegedy revealed after the verse of ikmal.

== Shia view ==
Nearly unanimous, Shia sources explain that the verse of Ikmal was revealed to Muhammad after his announcement about Ali at the Ghadir Khumm on the return trip after the Farewell Pilgrimage in 632. In particular, a tradition to this effect is attributed to the Shia imam Muhammad al-Baqir (d. 732) by various Shia authorities, including al-Qummi (d. 919), al-Qadi al-Nu'man (d. 974), al-Kulayni (d. 941), al-Tusi (d. 1067), and al-Tabarsi (d. 1153). Alternatively, a few Shia accounts suggest that the verse and Muhammad's announcement both took place during the Farewell Pilgrimage. In Shia sources, the perfection of religion and the completion of blessing in the verse of Ikmal followed the establishment of Ali's spiritual authority (walaya) over Muslims.

=== Tafsir al-mizan ===
Muhammad H. Tabatabai (d. 1981), author of the seminal Shia exegesis Tafsir al-mizan, argues in his work that 'today' in the verse of Ikmal is the day of the Ghadir Khumm. In particular, the unbelievers' despair in the verse of ikmal followed Muhammad's designation of Ali to guide the nascent Muslim community, he writes. The enemies of Islam despaired from destroying it, suggests Tabatabai, because Ali's leadership would have rightly guided the Muslim community.

Tabatabai contends that the perfection of religion in the verse of Ikmal is the guardianship (walaya) of Ali, as opposed to the closure of Islamic legislation, advanced by some Sunni scholars. According to Tabatabai, this Sunni view ignores the injunctions about riba which were revealed after the verse of ikmal. The Islamicist Hamid Mavani adds that the traditions cited by Tabatabai are mutawatir, that is, they have numerous, uninterrupted chains of transmission. Tabatabai elsewhere challenges the prevalent Sunni view by arguing that the perfection of Islam in this verse cannot refer to a minor occasion such as the promulgation of a religious injunction. He also maintains that the perfection of religion in the verse of ikmal was the fulfillment of an earlier divine promise in verse 24:55, which reads,

God has made a promise to those among you who believe and do good deeds: He will make them successors to the land, as He did those who came before them; He will strengthen the religion He has chosen for them; He will grant them security to replace their fear. They worship Me and do not join anything with Me.

For Tabatabai, the authority of the divine guides (ulu al-amr) completes the spiritual authority (walaya) of God and His prophet. Nevertheless, he adds, all this was conditional on the submission of Muslims to their divine instructions at the Ghadir Khumm per verse 8:53 of the Quran, which includes the passage, "God would never change a favor He had conferred on a people unless they changed what was within themselves."

== See also ==
- Verse of tabligh
- Verse of walaya
- Verse of purification
- Verse of obedience
- Verse of mawadda
- Hadith of warning
