= Verse of the mawadda =

Verse in the Quran with significance for Shia Muslims

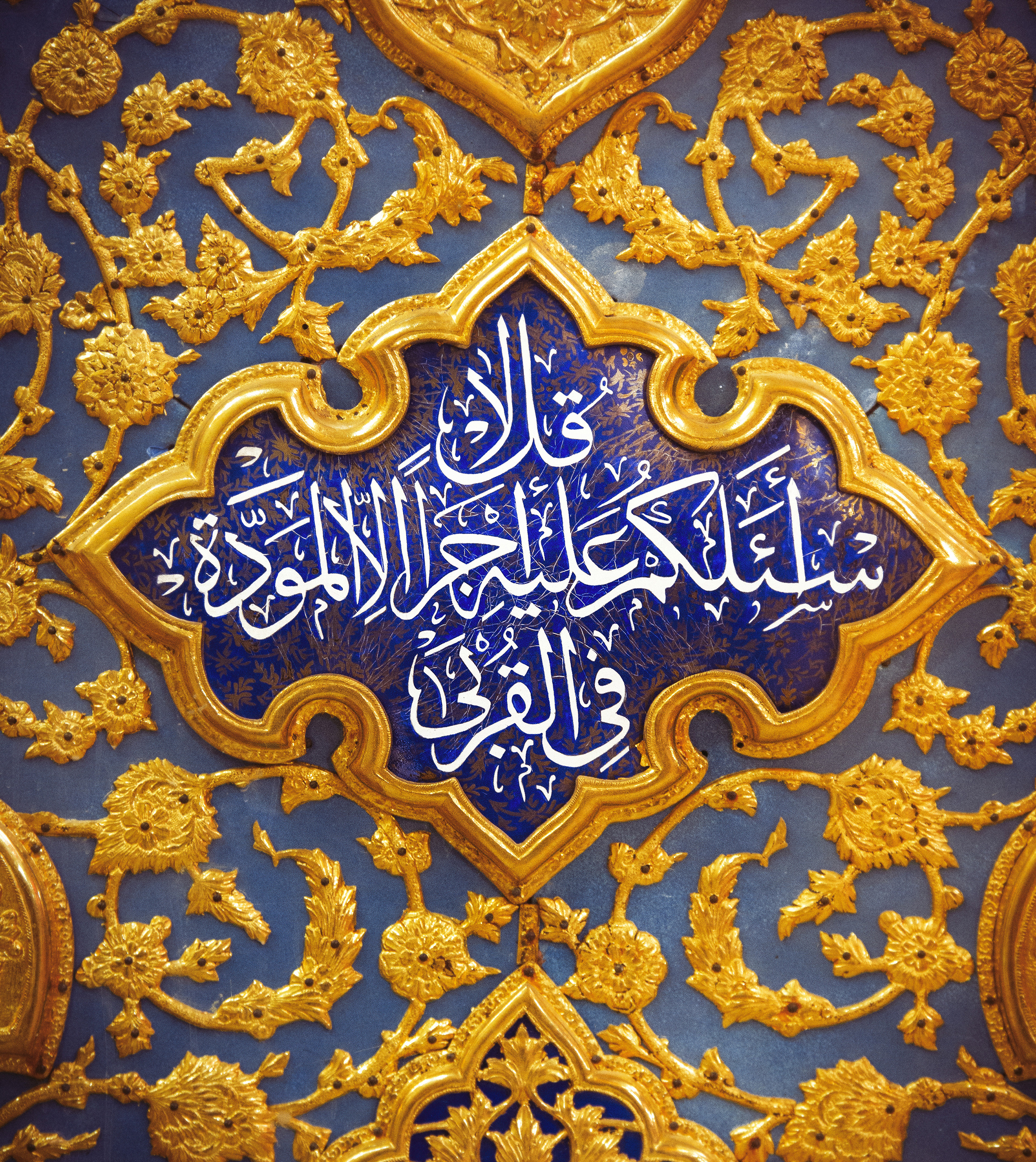
Mawadda verse inscribed in the Imam Husayn Shrine

The verse of the mawadda (Arabic: آية الْمَوَدَّة, lit. 'verse of affection/love') refers to verse al-Shura 42:23 of the Quran, the central religious text of Islam. This verse is often cited in Shia Islam to support the elevated status of the family of the Islamic prophet Muhammad, known as the Ahl al-Bayt. Most Sunni authors reject the Shia view and offer various alternatives, chief among them that this verse enjoins love for kinsfolk in general. The verse of the mawadda includes the passage,

قُل لَّآ أَسْـَٔلُكُمْ عَلَيْهِ أَجْرًا إِلَّا ٱلْمَوَدَّةَ فِى ٱلْقُرْبَىٰ ۗ وَمَن يَقْتَرِفْ حَسَنَةًۭ نَّزِدْ لَهُۥ فِيهَا حُسْنًا ۚ إِنَّ ٱللَّهَ غَفُورٌۭ شَكُورٌ
[O Muhammad!] Say, "I ask not of you any reward for it, save affection among kinsfolk (al-qurba)." And whosoever accomplishes a good deed, We shall increase him in goodness thereby. Truly God is Forgiving, Thankful.

== Shi'a view ==
The word al-qurba (Arabic: ٱلْقُرْبَىٰ) in this verse is interpreted in Shi'a as Muhammad's kin, the Ahl al-Bayt (Arabic: أَهْل ٱلْبَيْت, lit. 'people of the house'). In this vein, the Shi'a-leaning historian ibn Ishaq (d. 767) narrates that Muhammad specified al-qurba to be his daughter Fatima, her husband 'Ali, and their two sons, Hasan and Husayn. Among others, the Sunni historian al-Baladhuri (d. 892) quotes Hasan in his Genealogies of the Nobles as referring to the verse of the mawadda in his inaugural speech as the caliph after the assassination of his father in 661.

I am of the family of the prophet [ahl al-bayt] from whom God has removed filth and whom He has purified, whose love He has made obligatory in His Book (Quran) when He said, "Whosoever performs a good act, We shall increase the good in it." Performing a good act is love for us, the family of the prophet.

— Hasan ibn Ali

The Isma'ili jurist al-Qadi al-Nu'man (d. 974) writes that the Sunni scholar Hasan al-Basri (d. 728) had once reported on the authority of the early exegete ibn Abbas (d. c. 687) that Muhammad considered Ali, Fatima, and their sons as the al-qurba in this verse. Later, al-Nu'man continues, al-Basri reinterpreted the verse differently to mean gaining proximity to God through obedience to Him. This led to his repudiation as a "misconstruer of God's words" by the Shia imam Muhammad al-Baqir (d. c. 732).

Indeed, this and other prevalent Sunni interpretations of the verse of the mawadda are challenged in a theological argument attributed to al-Baqir. Alternatively, the Islamicist Wilferd Madelung (d. 2023) suggests that the wording in the verse of the mawadda does not agree with the Shia interpretation, which is also what the Sunni exegete al-Tabari (d. 923) writes: for the Shia interpretation to hold, the verse should have ended with the phrase mawaddat al-qurba. The Sufi scholar Ahmad ibn Ajiba (d. 1809) counters that the present ending (mawaddat fi al-qurba) creates a more emphatic injunction to love Muhammad's kin.

In Twelver Shi'ism, this love also entails obedience to the Ahl al-Bayt as the source of exoteric and esoteric religious guidance. This obedience is believed to benefit the faithful first and foremost because of Saba verse 34:47, "Say, 'I ask not of you any reward; that shall be yours (fa-huwa la-kum).'"

== Sunni view ==
Some Sunni commentators agree with the Shia view, including al-Razi (d. 1209), Baydawi (d. 1319), and Ibn al-Maghazili. Supporting the Shia interpretation of the verse, the Shia author Muhammad Rayshahri (d. 2022) cites the Sunni scholars Ibn Hanbal (d. 855), al-Bukhari (d. 870), al-Tirmidhi (d. 892), al-Zamakhshari (d. 1143), and al-Suyuti (d. 1505). Most Sunni authors, however, offer various alternatives to the Shia view. For instance, al-Tabari lists four different proposals and the one he prefers is that the verse of the mawadda instructs Muslims to love Muhammad because of their blood relations to him. Madelung rejects this interpretation because this verse was likely revealed in Medina, where many Muslims did not have family ties with Muhammad. Besides, argues al-Baqir, Muslims love Muhammad anyway for their faith in him as the prophet of God. Instead, Madelung suggests that the verse of the mawadda demands love towards relatives in general, which appears to be the common Sunni view. This interpretation thus minimizes the importance of love for the Ahl al-Bayt.

Another Sunni view is that the verse of the mawadda was abrogated by verse 34:47, which includes the passage, "Say, 'whatever I ask you with regard to my reward, it is for you.'" Alternatively, al-Baqir interprets verse 34:47 as, "Say, 'whatever I ask you in way of return is meant for you.'" That is, in his view, even if verse 34:47 was revealed after the verse of the mawadda, it only emphasized the latter verse by noting that the love for relations therein is intended to benefit the believers and not Muhammad. Yet another proposal listed by al-Tabari is that the verse of the mawadda asks Muslims to love God in approaching him through their deeds, a view also propounded by Hasan al-Basri. An argument attributed to al-Baqir counters that this interpretation obviates the words love (mawadda) and reward in the verse.

== See also ==
- Ahl al-Bayt
- Ahl al-Kisa
- Mawaddat al-Qurba
- Verse of ikmal al-din
- Verse of the walaya
- Verse of purification
- Verse of obedience
- Hasan ibn Ali in the Quran and Hadith
- Husayn ibn Ali in the Quran and Hadith
