= Verse of walaya =

Quranic verse with contested meanings

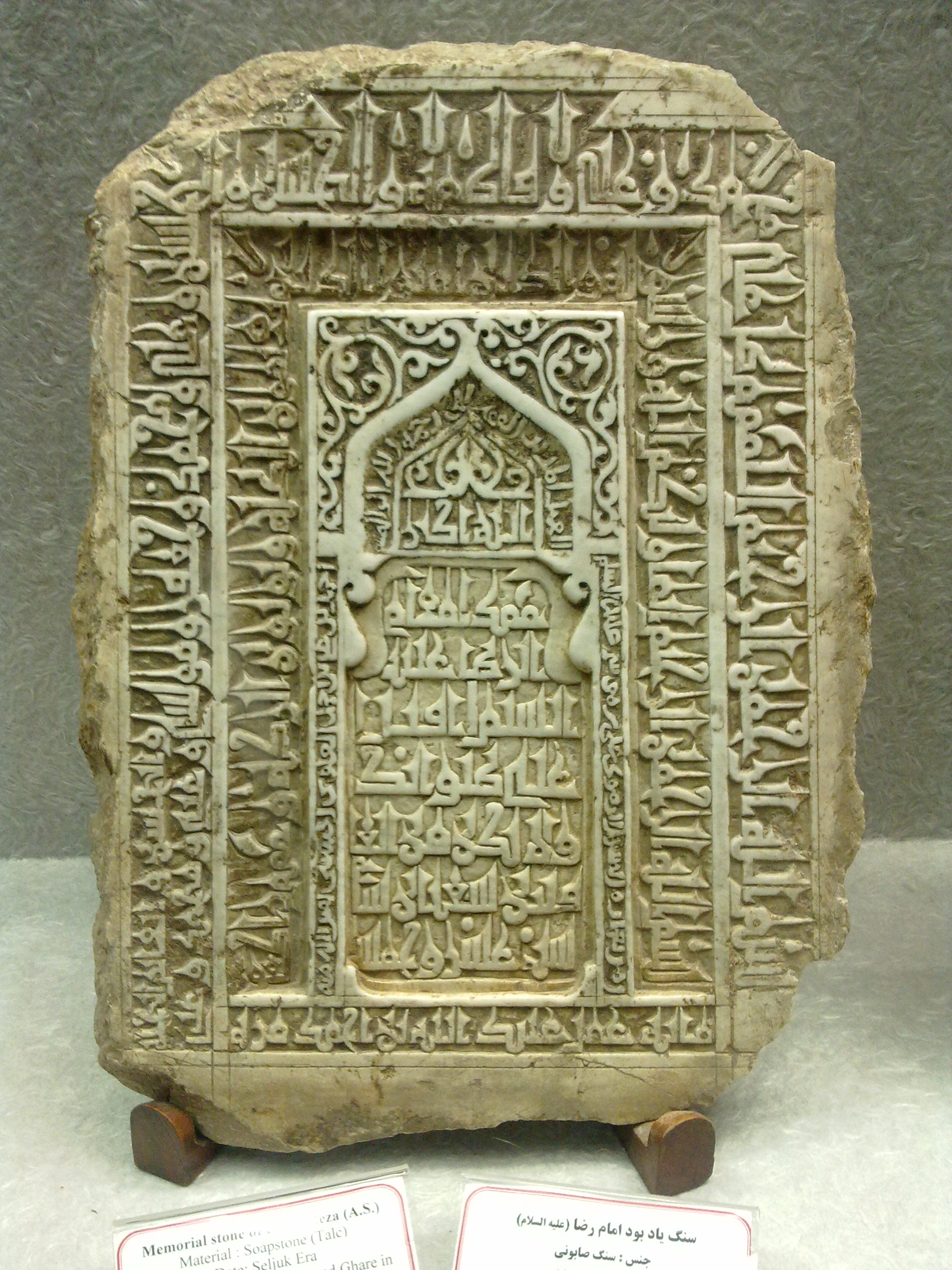
Memorial stone of the Shia imam Ali al-Rida, on display in the Razavi museum, Mashhad, Iran. The stone was carved by Abd-Allah ibn Ahmad in the Seljuk era. The verse of walaya is engraved on its margins.

The Verse of walaya (Arabic: آيَة ٱلْوَلَايَة) is verse 5:55 of the Quran, the central religious text of Islam. The verse specifies three authorities as the only sources of walaya for Muslims. In Sunni Islam, walaya in this context signifies 'friendship' or 'support', whereas Shia Muslims interpret it as 'spiritual authority' because of its exclusivity.

The first two authorities listed in the verse are God and the Islamic prophet Muhammad. In some Sunni sources, the third authority is all Muslims, whereas Shia sources identify the third authority in this verse as Ali, the cousin and son-in-law of Muhammad, citing the occasion of its revelation.

In Shia Islam, this verse thus sanctions the spiritual authority of Ali over all Muslims, after God and Muhammad, and supports his (usurped) right to succeed the prophet. Sunni sources also associate the verse with Ali but generally reject the Shia interpretation of it as establishing his succession to Muhammad.

== Wali ==
The Arabic root w-l-y of the word wali describes affinity and proximity between two parties, and the word itself thus means one who is near and close, as in guardian, friend, helper, master, or heir. In a political context, wali is an individual who exercises political authority on behalf of a superior power (even God). The plural form of the word wali is awliya' and the words walaya, wilaya, awla, mawla are from the same Arabic root; all these words appear in the Quran. Therein, al-Wali appears as a name of God, meaning Protector (of those who believe in Him). Applied to others, the word wali in the Quran takes various meanings, including 'protecting friend', 'guardian', 'lord', 'master', and (spiritual or material) heir.

== Walaya and wilaya ==
The two corresponding nouns, walaya and wilaya, are indistinguishable in an unvocalized text, and have nearly identical meanings, namely, 'to be near or close to something', 'to be a friend or relative of someone', 'to manage or govern, to have authority or command'. Between the two words, walaya often refers to the first two of the three meanings, while wilaya commonly refers to the last meaning, that is, authority.

In the Quran, the word walaya broadly indicates the mutual bond of loyalty between God and those who believe in Him, the bond of loyalty among Muslims, and lastly the bond among adherents of all monotheistic religions. The strength of these loyalties may vary, however, as suggested by the Shia translation of verse 33:6 of the Quran, "The prophet has a greater claim (awla) on the faithful that they have on themselves." Yet the Sunni translation of the same verse is, "The prophet is more caring towards the believers than they are themselves." Alternatively, the word wilaya signifies authority and power in the Quran, as personified by the leader of the Muslim community after the Islamic prophet Muhammad, a reference to the Quranic term uli al-amr (lit. 'those in command'). In particular, the words walaya and wilaya occur twice in the Quran, in verses 8:72 and 18:44, but experts disagree about their correct vocalization.

== Verse of walaya ==
Known in Shia Islam as the verse of walaya (or wilaya), verse 5:55 of the Quran is translated by The Study Quran as

Your protector (wali) is only (innama) God, and His Messenger, and those who believe, who perform the prayer and give alms (zakat) while (waw) bowing down.

This matches the Shia translation, and also appears similar to that provided by the Islamicist Hermann Landolt. However, the Sunni translation of the verse is, "Your (real) friends are (no less than) God, His Messenger, and the believers—those who establish prayers and pay zakat and (waw) they bow down humbly (in worship)." Responsible for their difference is the Arabic conjunction waw, which can mean 'while', as in the Shia translation, or may mean 'and', as in the Sunni translation.

== Occasion of revelation ==
=== Jewish tribes ===
The verse of walaya was revealed in Medina. As for the occasion of its revelation, the Sunni exegetes Ibn Kathir (d. 1373) and al-Kashani (d. 1336) report that the verse was revealed after Ubada ibn al-Samit broke his ties with the Jewish clans and pledged his allegiance solely to Muhammad. Alternatively, the Sunni exegeses Tafsir al-jalalayn and Asbab nuzul al-qur'an consider this verse a response to some companions of Muhammad who complained about their social ostracization by certain Jewish tribes. Finally, the Sunni historian Ibn al-Kalbi (d. 819) believes that the verse was revealed when Abd-Allah ibn Salam and some others converted to Islam and the Jewish tribes subsequently revoked their contract of clientage (muwalat).

=== Ali ===
By contrast, the verse is considered a specific reference to Ali ibn Abi Talib by Shia and some Sunni commentators, specifically a reference to when Ali reputedly gave his ring to a beggar while he was bowing in worship. This was the verdict of Ibn Abbas (d. 687) and Mujahid ibn Jabr (d. 722), two influential early exegetes. Such reports are included in the works of the Shia theologian al-Mufid (d. 1022), and the Sunni authors al-Baydawi (d. 1286), Ibn Kathir, al-Tabari (d. 923), al-Zamakhshari (d. 1144), al-Wahidi (d. 1076), al-Razi (d. 1210), Ahmad al-Tabari (d. 1295), and al-Suyuti (d. 1505). For instance, al-Tabari ascribes a similar tradition to the Shia imam Muhammad al-Baqir (d. c. 732) but also includes in his work a contradictory report in which al-Baqir explicitly denies any specific link between the verse and Ali. Yet the two traditions share a common origin in their isnads, which casts doubts on their authenticity. The attribution of the latter anti-Shia report to the Shia imam al-Baqir may also suggest some early Sunni efforts to present al-Baqir as a Sunni scholar. A minority of Sunni traditions link the verse of walaya to Abu Bakr.

Nevertheless, the frequent association of this verse with Ali in early Sunni sources supports its authenticity. In particular, the Sunni authors al-Suyuti and Muhib al-Din al-Tabari (d. 1294) include in their works essentially the same account on the authority of Abu Dharr (d. 652), a companion of Muhammad.

One day we prayed the noontime prayers with the prophet. A person in need asked people to help but no one gave him anything, "Oh God! Be witness that in the mosque of the prophet no one gave me anything." Ali ibn Abi Talib was in the position of genuflection in the prayers. He pointed with his finger to the person, who took his ring and left. The prophet, who was observing the scene raised his head toward heaven and said: "Oh God! My brother Moses said to Thee, 'Expand my breast and make easy my tasks and make my tongue eloquent so that they will comprehend my words, and make my brother, Harun, my help and vizier (cf. Quran, 20:35). Oh God! I am also Thy prophet; expand my breast and make easy my tasks and make Ali my vizier and helper.’" The words of the prophet had not as yet finished when the verse [cited above] was revealed.

== Exegesis ==
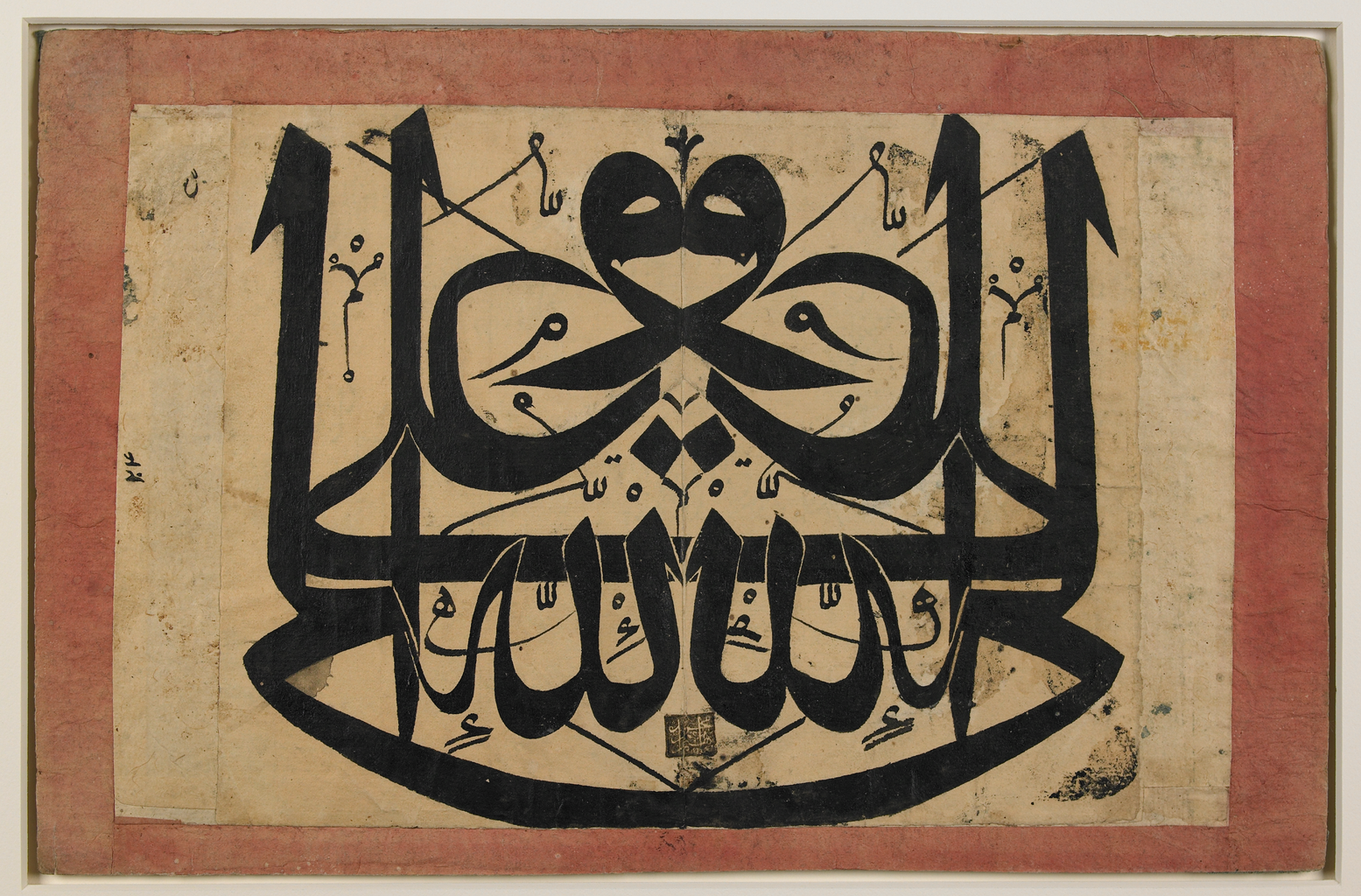
Bektashi mirrored calligraphy, reading "Ali is the wali of God"

For al-Tabari, the last part of the verse of walaya describes believers in general, while al-Razi and al-Zamakhshari limit the verse to sincere believers who are untainted by hypocrisy. In their view, the verse also stresses the importance of humility in religious deeds. The verse of walaya for Sunnis thus necessitates that Muslims only rely on God, Muhammad, and other Muslims for protection. Even those Sunni authors who acknowledge a link between this verse and Ali reject any Shia implications. For instance, al-Zamakhshari suggests that the verse encourages Muslims to emulate Ali, who did not delay charity until the end of his prayer, al-Razi interprets wali in this verse as a protecting friend, while Ibn Kathir questions the authenticity of the related hadiths about Ali.

=== Extent of walaya ===
The Sunni interpretation of the verse is rejected by Shias who argue that the notion of loyalty among Muslims already appears elsewhere in verse 9:71 without the restrictive particle innama (lit. 'only'). By contrast, the particle innama confines the walaya in the verse to God, Muhammad, and those believers who gave alms while praying. Walaya in this verse thus has a different significance than mere friendship. The walaya in this verse, they argue, is similar to that in verse 33:6, "The prophet has a greater claim (awla) on the faithful that they have on themselves."

For the Shia, walaya in this verse thus signifies spiritual authority. Because of its link to Ali, the verse of walaya therefore presents Ali as the rightful authority over all believers, after God and Muhammad, and naturally sanctions his right to succeed Muhammad as the spiritual and political leader of the Muslim community. The hadith literature, consensus among scholars, and the occasion of its revelation are further cited in Shia sources to support this interpretation of the verse. Indeed, the verse of walaya might be the most frequently cited verse by the Shia in support of Ali's rights. The absolute loyalty ordained in the verse also supports the Shia claim that the prophet and imams are infallible, lest their followers would be misled. In the Shia literature, the word walaya is primarily reserved for this spiritual authority of the Shia imams (and the prophets in their capacity as imams), which is an all-encompassing bond of spiritual loyalty between the infallible imam and his followers. The term wali is applied both to Shia imams in Shia Islam and to Sufi sheikhs in Sufism. Especially in Sufism, wali Allah (lit. 'friend of God') denotes God's elect.

==== Singular and plural forms ====
The appearance of the word wali in the verse of walaya, instead of its plural form awlia', does not contradict its Shia interpretation, that is the verse exclusively refers to Ali. Yet the word those in the verse suggests otherwise. At the same time, there may also be other instances in the Quran where the plural form is used but a single person is meant, including verse 3:168 about Abd Allah ibn Ubayy (d. 631), a tribal chief contemporary to Muhammad. Some other such instances were listed by the Shia theologian al-Tusi (d. 1067). Alternatively, the Islamic author Reza Shah-Kazemi proposes that 'those who believe' in the verse of walaya are symbolized by Ali, referring to the description of Ali as "faith, in its entirety," attributed to Muhammad. That is, Shah-Kazemi suggests that the authority in this verse is limited to God, Muhammad, Ali, and all those believers who reach the rank of sainthood.

== See also ==
- Verse of obedience
- Verse of ikmal al-din
- Verse of mawadda
- Verse of purification
- Ghadir Khumm
- Hadith of warning
