= Verse of obedience =

Verse of the Quran

The verse of obedience (Arabic: آيَة ٱلطَّاعَة) is verse 4:59 of the central religious text in Islam, the Quran. It reads

يَـٰٓأَيُّهَا ٱلَّذِينَ ءَامَنُوٓا۟ أَطِيعُوا۟ ٱللَّهَ وَأَطِيعُوا۟ ٱلرَّسُولَ وَأُو۟لِى ٱلْأَمْرِ مِنكُمْ ۖ فَإِن تَنَـٰزَعْتُمْ فِى شَىْءٍۢ فَرُدُّوهُ إِلَى ٱللَّهِ وَٱلرَّسُولِ إِن كُنتُمْ تُؤْمِنُونَ بِٱللَّهِ وَٱلْيَوْمِ ٱلْـَٔاخِرِ ۚ ذَٰلِكَ خَيْرٌۭ وَأَحْسَنُ تَأْوِيلًا
O you who believe! Obey God and obey the Messenger and those in authority (uli al-amr) among you. And if you differ among yourselves concerning any matter, refer it to God and the Messenger, if you believe in God and the Last Day. That is better, and fairer in outcome.

In Sunni Islam, "those in authority" (Arabic: أولي الأمر, romanized: ulil amr) in this verse variously refers to Caliphs Abu Bakr and Umar, the (military) commanders of the Islamic prophet Muhammad, his companions, or religious scholars, though the prevalent Sunni view identifies those in authority as the rulers of the Muslim communities. In Twelver Shia Islam, those in authority are the Twelve Imams, and the absolute obedience mandated in this verse is viewed as evidence of the Imams' infallibility.

== Sunni view ==
In Sunni Islam, the verse is linked to Muhammad's appointment of Abd Allah ibn Hudhafa to command a detachment in the Muslim army. The obedience to Muhammad and those in authority is tantamount in this verse to the obedience to God, which the historian al-Tabari (d. 310/923) supports with a prophetic hadith in his exegesis. After the death of Muhammad, most Sunni commentators interpret obedience to Muhammad as following his precedence (Sunna).

Considering its political significance, there are various views about the identity of those in authority in this verse, reflecting the theological and political groups in early Islam. Some of the hadiths reported by Ibn Kathir (d. 774/1373), al-Tabari, and al-Wahidi (d. 468/1076) identify those in authority as Muhammad's (military) commanders. This is also the view of Khalid Y. Blankinship. Some other traditions presented by al-Tabari and al-Qurtubi (d. 671/1272) identify those in authority in the verse of obedience as religious scholars, while another group identifies them as Muhammad's companions, or the first two caliphs after Muhammad, namely, Abu Bakr (r. 632–634) and Umar (r. 634–644). However, the prevalent Sunni view is that those in authority in the verse is a reference to the rulers of the Muslim community.

Blankinship and Mahmoud M. Ayoub (d. 2021) note the absolute obedience to those in authority in verse 4:59. This obedience must be conducive to obedience to God and Muhammad, which in turn necessitates that those in authority themselves are flawlessly obedient to God and Muhammad, according to Ayoub. On the other hand, Blankinship suggests that the absolute obedience in verse 4:59 might be somewhat tempered by verse 3:159, which instructs Muhammad to consult his followers before making a decision.

=== Hadith literature ===
Bernard Lewis (d. 2018) lists two well-attested hadiths that may limit the extent of obedience in Islam. One says, "there is no obedience in sin," suggesting an Islamic duty of opposition to sinful authority. The other pronouncement, "Do not obey a creature against his creator," similarly limits those in authority. Alternatively, recounting the opposition of Abu Dharr (d. 652) to the conduct of Uthman (r. 644–656), al-Tabari quotes the prophetic hadith, "[Abu Dharr!] Hear and obey, even if the man in authority over you is a slave with a mutilated nose." He includes another hadith, also attributed to Muhammad, "Any one who rises up when the people have an imam, seeking thereby to create sedition and disunity, you must kill him." Quoting this hadith, Abu Musa al-Ash'ari reportedly noted that Muhammad had said any imam, not necessarily a just imam. The Kufa governor and companion of Muhammad thus attempted to placate the Kufan rebellion against Uthman, without success. Above justice or moral integrity, al-Ash'ari thus placed his fear of discord and unrest, which later became anathema to Sunni Islam.

== Twelver Shia view ==
As reported in Tafsir al-tibyan and Tafsir al-Qomi, the Twelver traditions identify those in authority in the verse of obedience as the Twelve Imams, who are viewed as infallible divine guides after Muhammad. The Sunni al-Tabari reports a tradition attributed to the fifth Imam al-Baqir where those in authority are instead identified as (religious) scholars, though he also suppresses the hadiths that favor the Twelver view and includes the Sunni hadiths that specify those in authority as Abu Bakr and Umar.

=== Occultation ===
The twelfth Imam is the eschatological Muhammad al-Mahdi, who is expected to reappear from occultation (874-present) in the end of time to fill the earth with peace and justice. While the uli al-amr in the verse of obedience is traditionally limited to the Imams in Twelver Shia, Sadr (d. 1980) recently extended it to include Shia jurists in a novel reading of the traditions. Montazeri (d. 2009) made a similar comment before retracting it. Their view is rejected by Shamsuddin who argues that the verse does not grant jurists a mandate to rule even if it gives them the authority to issue legally-binding rulings in the context of Shia jurisprudence (fiqh).

== Justice ==
A Sunni hadith asserts that a Muslim would be rewarded for obeying those in authority regardless of their virtue, as reported by Ibn Kathir and al-Tabari. Another well-known Sunni tradition reads, "One day of anarchy is worse than a thousand years of tyranny." Yet other hadiths forbid Muslims from obeying anyone in disobedience to God. Some Sunnis have thus limited those in authority in the verse of obedience to just rulers.

=== Infallibility ===
The Sunni al-Razi (d. 606/1210) argues in his al-Tafsir al-kabir that the absolute obedience in this verse to those in authority necessitates their infallibility because obedience to those who sin is prohibited in verse 76:24, "Do not yield to any of these sinners and disbelievers," and also in verses 2:229 and 26:151. Yet al-Razi considers the Muslim community collectively as an infallible entity instead of those in authority. As noted by Mavani, the Shia criticism of this view is that the consensus of Muslims is invalid for selecting a successor to Muhammad. This view is elaborated by Madelung who writes that the succession of prophets is a matter that is settled in the Quran by divine selection and not by the community. In particular, he adds, God selects their successors from their own families, whether or not those successors become prophets themselves. Jafri and Abbas have similar views.

The verse of obedience mandates absolute obedience to God, Muhammad, and the Imams in Twelver Shia, where this verse is also viewed as evidence of the spiritual infallibility (isma) of the Imams because, they argue, God would only demand obedience to someone protected from religious error.

== Arbitration ==
After Muhammad's death, the verse of obedience stipulates that disagreements are to be arbitrated by referring to the Quran and Sunna. While those in authority are absent from arbitration here, they are mentioned elsewhere in verse 5:83, which includes the passage, "And whenever tidings come unto them, whether of security or fear, they spread it about, whereas had they referred it to the Messenger and to those in authority among them, those of them whose task it is to investigate would have known it." Lalani attributes to the Twelver Imam al-Baqir (d. c. 114/732) this argument, which also appears in al-Jami' li-ahkam al-Quran by the Sunni al-Qurtubi (d. 671/1272).

== See also ==
- Uli al-amr
- Verse of ikmal al-din
- Verse of wilaya
- Verse of purification
- Ali in the Quran
- Ikhtilaf
- Taqlid
- Ijtihad
- Madhhab

== Sources ==
- Nasr, S.H.; Dagli, C.K.; Dakake, M.M.; Lumbard, J.E.B.; Rustom, M., eds. (2015). The Study Quran: A New Translation and Commentary. Harper Collins. ISBN 9780062227621.
- Lalani, Arzina R. (2000). Early Shi'i Thought: The Teachings of Imam Muhammad al-Baqir. I. B. Tauris. ISBN 978-1860644344.
- Momen, M. (1985). An Introduction to Shi'i Islam. Yale University Press. ISBN 9780300034998.
- Steigerwald, Diana (2008), "Twelver Shīʿī Taʾwīl", The Blackwell Companion to the Qurʾān, Blackwell Companions to Religion, Oxford: Blackwell Publishing, pp. 373–385, ISBN 978-1-4051-7844-0
- Kadi, Wadad (2001). "Authority". In McAuliffe, Jane Dammen (ed.). Encyclopaedia of the Qurʾān. Vol. 1. Brill. pp. 188–90. ISBN 90-04-14743-8.
- Blankinship, Khalid Yahya (2003). "Obedience". In McAuliffe, Jane Dammen (ed.). Encyclopaedia of the Qurʾān. Vol. 3. Brill. pp. 566–9. ISBN 90-04-14743-8.
- Madelung, Wilferd (1997). The Succession to Muhammad: A Study of the Early Caliphate. Cambridge University Press. ISBN 978-0-521-64696-3.
- Abbas, Hassan (2021). The Prophet's Heir: the Life of Ali ibn Abi Talib. Yale University Press. ISBN 9780300252057.
- Jafri, S.H.M (1979). Origins and Early Development of Shia Islam. London: Longman.
- Mavani, Hamid (2013). Religious Authority and Political Thought in Twelver Shiʿism: From Ali to Post-Khomeini. Routledge Studies in Political Islam. Abingdon: Routledge. ISBN 978-1-135-04473-2.
- Köchler, Hans (1982). The Concept of Monotheism in Islam and Christianity. International Progress Organization. ISBN 9783700303398.
- Ayoub, Mahmoud M. (2014). The Crisis of Muslim History: Religion and Politics in Early Islam. Oneworld Publications. ISBN 9781780746746.
- Keaney, Heather N. (2021). 'Uthman ibn 'Affan: Legend or Liability?. Oneworld Publications. ISBN 9781786076984.
