= Hadith of the warning =

Islamic tradition

The hadith of the warning (Arabic: يوم الإنذار, romanized: yawm al-inzar), also known as the invitation of the relatives (Arabic: دعوة ذو العشیرة, romanized: da'wat dhul-ashira), is an Islamic tradition (hadith) that describes how the Islamic prophet Muhammad made his prophetic mission public. There are two versions of this hadith, both of which are linked to the verse of the ashira (lit. 'family'), that is, verse 26:214 of the Quran, the central religious text in Islam. In one version, Muhammad addresses his clan and likens the Judgement Day to an approaching enemy. In the other version, found in Shia and some Sunni sources, Muhammad invites his close relatives to Islam after a meal and seeks their assistance and deputyship. Among them, his young cousin Ali ibn Abi Talib is the only one who offers his help to Muhammad, who then announces him as his heir and successor.

== Verse of the ashira ==
Verse 26:214 of the Quran, known also as the verse of ashira (lit. 'family'), is directed at Muhammad, "And warn your nearest relations." The verse of the ashira thus commanded Muhammad to make his prophetic mission public by inviting his relatives to Islam around 613 or 617 CE, some three years after the first divine revelation, according to the early historians Ibn Sa'd (d. 845) and Ibn Ishaq (d. 767). There are two versions of how things unfolded, which might correspond to two separate attempts by Muhammad, though both attempts were reportedly thwarted by his uncle Abu Lahab. The verse of the ashira may also parallel Abraham's warning to his father in the same chapter (sura) of the Quran.

== Approaching enemy ==
According to the first version, Muhammad addressed his clan with a warning that likened the Judgement Day to an approaching enemy, as reported in Sahih Muslim, a canonical Sunni compilation of hadiths.

Alas for the sons of Abd Manaf! I am a warner. I am a man who has seen the enemy and hastens to warn his people before the enemy gets ahead of him and exclaims, "Alas, you are being attacked!"

In other variants, Muhammad also warned his close relatives about Judgement Day, saying, "I possess nothing to your credit with God." Nevertheless, these variants might have been independent statements later linked to the verse of the ashira to lend more credibility to the idea of free will in Islam. In this first version, Abu Lahab responded to Muhammad with abusive comments, as transmitted by the early exegete Ibn Abbas, retorting, "Damn you, is this what you called us for?"

=== Views ===
The implication that even kinship to Muhammad does not secure salvation has an anti-Shia message in the opinion of the Islamicist Uri Rubin (d. 2021), since the Shia values the kinship of their imams with Muhammad. Indeed, Wilferd Madelung (d. 2023), another expert, believes that the families of the past prophets play a prominent role in the Quran, to the point that their descendants are often selected by God in the Quran as the spiritual and material heirs to the prophets. His view is shared by the historian Husain M. Jafri (d. 2019). Yet merit is also a Quranic criterion for membership in a prophet's household (ahl al-bayt), argues the philosopher Oliver Leaman. For instance, Madelung and Rainer Brunner, another Islamicist, both observe that renegade members of the families of the past prophets are not excluded from God's punishment in the Quran. In particular, Noah's family is saved from the deluge, except his wife and one of his sons, about whom Noah's plea was rejected in verse 11:46, "O Noah, he [your son] is not of your family (ahl)."

== Feast ==
According to the second version, Muhammad gathered his relatives for a meal. Then he invited them to Islam, as reported by the Sunni historian al-Tabari (d. 923) in his Tarikh al-Tabari on the authority of Ali, via Ibn Abbas. In this tradition, Abu Lahab foiled Muhammad's first attempt by dispersing the crowd. On the second attempt, Muhammad announced,

O family of Abd al-Muttalib, by God, I do not know of anyone among the Arabs who has brought his people anything better than what I have brought you. I have brought you the best of this world and the next. God Almighty has ordered me to call you to Him. And which of you will assist me in this cause and become my brother, my trustee and my successor among you.

Possibly the youngest there at the age of about fourteen, Ali was the only relative who offered his assistance to Muhammad, according to al-Tabari. In response, Muhammad brought him close and declared,

This [Ali] is my brother, my executor, and my successor among you, so listen to him and obey.

Muhammad's announcement was nonetheless met with ridicule from Abu Lahab and the guests dispersed, al-Tabari concludes. The account of the Shia-leaning Ibn Ishaq (d. 767) is similar to that of al-Tabari. The Sunni historian Ibn Hisham (d. 833), however, omitted this tradition from his recension of Ibn Ishaq's sira, possibly because of its Shia implications. Muhammad's response to Ali in this particular tradition is also not included in Musnad Ahmad ibn Hanbal, a Sunni collection of hadiths. In contrast, the response above appears in Shia exegeses under the verse of the ashira, including those by al-Qumi (d. 919) and al-Tabarsi (d. 1153). Among Sunnis, traditions similar to that of al-Tabari are also reported by Abu al-Fida (d. 1331) in his Tarikh Abu al-Fida and by Ibn Kathir (d. 1373) in his universal history al-Bidaya wa-l-nihaya.

=== Miracle ===
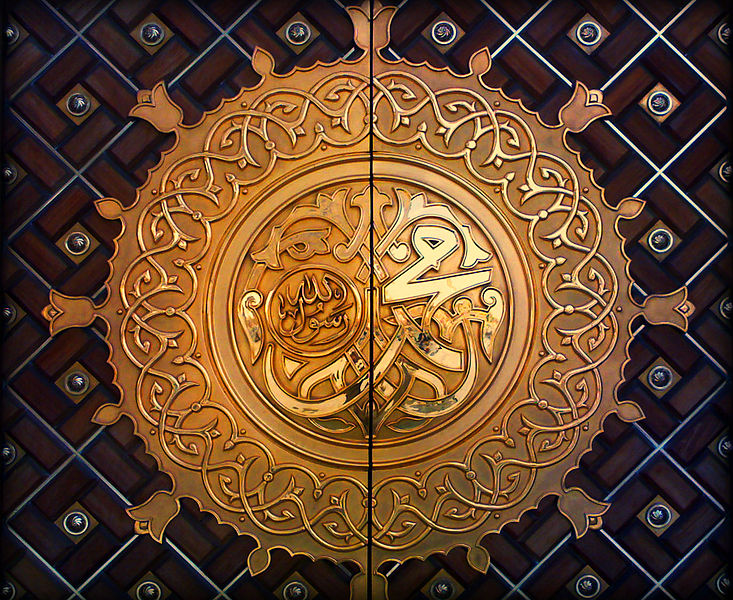
Muhammad's name, followed by his title 'Envoy of God', inscribed on the gates of al-Masjid al-Nabawi, located in Medina, present-day Saudi Arabia

Some traditions attribute a miraculous aspect to this event. For instance, the Sunni historian Ibn Sa'd (d. 845) narrates that Muhammad fed his guests with a single plate of food, which Abu Lahab dismissed as a sorcery. In this tradition, however, Muhammad rejects Ali's offer to help because of his youth. This negative response to Ali is similar to that in a separate tradition in Musnad Ahmad ibn Hanbal.

=== Views ===
Rubin writes that Ali's response to the invitation of Muhammad contrasts the response of his tribe, the Quraysh. He and Moojan Momen, another expert, suggest that the early appointment of Ali as Muhammad's heir in this version supports his right to succeed Muhammad, a central tenet of Shia Islam. Indeed, it is in this vein that the Shia exegete Muhammad H. Tabatabai (d. 1981) invokes this tradition. Rubin also notes that the association of this tradition with the verse of the ashira lends it divine authorization. At any rate, the linguist Richard F. Burton (d. 1890) comments that this banquet "won for [Muhammad] a proselyte worth a thousand sabers in the person of Ali, son of Abu Talib."

== See also ==
- Ghadir Khumm
- Succession to Muhammad
- Hadith of the City of Knowledge
