= Imamate and guardianship of Ali =

About Ali the first Imam of Shia Islam and his position

Imam Ali علي ʿAlayhi-s-Salām Raḍiya Ilāhu ʿAnhū
- Depiction of Ali in the Shia tradition by Auteur Inconnu, 1978

1st Shia Imam
- In office 8 June 632 – 28 January 661
- Preceded by: Established position Muhammad (as Prophet)
- Succeeded by: Hasan ibn Ali
- Title: ʾAmīr al-Muʾminīn; Asadullāh; Walī-u-Allāh; Abū Turāb; Al-Murtaḍā; Abū al-Ḥasan; Ḥaydar al-Karrār; Al-Ṣiddīq al-Akbar; Al-Fārūq al-Aʿẓam; Yaʿsūb al-Dīn; Abū al-Aʾimmah; Mawlā al-Muttaqīn; Sayyid al-Muslimīn; Bâb-e Madînat-ul-Ilm; Karram-Allāh-u Wajhahu

Personal life
- Born: Ali ibn Abi Talib c. 600 CE Mecca, Hejaz, Arabia
- Died: c. 28 January 661 CE (c. 21 Ramadan 40 AH) (aged c. 60) Kufa, Rashidun Caliphate
- Cause of death: Fatally wounded after being struck on the head by a poison-coated sword
- Resting place: Imam Ali Shrine, Najaf, Iraq; 31.996111°N 44.314167°E
- Spouse: Fatima bint Muhammad (m. 623–624; died 632); Umama bint Abi al-As (m. 633–634); Al-Sahba bint Rabi'a (m. 634–636; died 650–655); Asma bint Umais (m. 634–635); Khawla bint Jaʿfar (m. 635–637; died 645–650); Fatima bint Huzam (m. 637–645); Layla bint Mas'ud (m. 644–649); Umm Sa'id bint Urwa (m. 649–653; died 655–656); Muhayya bint 'Imru (m. 656–660; div. 660–661)
- Children: Descendants of Ali: Hasan; Husayn; Zaynab; Umm Kulthum; Muhsin; Muhammad al-Hanafiyya; Abbas; Ruqayya; Umm al-Hasan; Ramla; Fakhitah; Khadija; Fatima; Maymunah; Umm Abiha; Nafisa; Jumana; Umm al-Kiram; Umm al-Salama; Umamah; Abdullah; Ubaydullah; Ja'far; Muhammad al-Awsat; Uthman; Umar; Abu Bakr; Muhammad al-Asghar
- Parents: Abu Talib ibn Abd al-Muttalib (father); Fatimah bint Asad (mother)
- Notable work(s): Mushaf of Ali; Nahj al-Balagha; Kitab Ali
- Known for: Central figure of Shia Islam

Religious life
- Religion: Islam
- Order: Quraysh (Banu Hashim)
- School: Shia
- Lineage: Family tree of Ali

Imamate and guardianship of Ali ibn Abi Talib or Imamate and Wilayah of Ali ibn Abi Talib refers to the spiritual position of Ali (1st Shia Imam and 4th Caliph of Islam) and his role in teaching the religion truth and establishing Islamic Sharia after Muhammad, the Prophet of Islam. He served as the 1st Shia Imam from 8 June 632 until 28 January 661. He was succeeded by his first son, Hasan ibn Ali.

Ali was born to Abu Talib ibn Abd al-Muttalib and Fatima bint Asad, raised by his cousin the Prophet Muhammad, and recognized by both Sunni and Shia sources as the only person born inside the Kaaba. He was a prominent member of the Ahl al-Bayt and Ahl al-Kisa who accepted Islam first, participated in the Event of the mubahala, and served as Muhammad's secretary, deputy, and army flag-bearer. He played a pivotal role in early Islam by risking his life to sleep in Muhammad's bed to fool assassins during the flight to Medina as an act of sacrifice tied to Quran 2:207, later marrying the Prophet’s daughter Fatima, and entering an exclusive pact of brotherhood with Muhammad, who highly praised him in sayings like the Hadith of the position that comparing them to Aaron and Moses. While both sects acknowledge his vital military contributions and several Quranic verses interpreted as honoring him (the verses of Walaya, Laylat al-mabit, and Ikmal ad-Din). On 632 AD, Muhammad declared, "Whoever I am his mawla, then Ali is his mawla." in Ghadir Khumm. Shia Muslims interpret mawla as "master" or "authority," viewing the event as Ali's formal appointment as Muhammad's successor.

== During Muhammad's time ==
Ali is a prominent member of the Ahl al-Bayt and Ahl al-Kisa, and a participant in the Event of the mubahala. Born to Abu Talib ibn Abd al-Muttalib and Fatima bint Asad, Ali was raised in the house of his cousin Muhammad and was among the first to accept Islam. Both Shia and Sunni sources report that Ali was the only person born inside the Kaaba, the holiest site in Islam. Several verses of the Quran have been interpreted in Shia Islam as referring to Ali, with some of these interpretations also appearing in the works of Sunni commentators. They include the Verse of walaya, the Verse of Laylat al-mabit, and the Verse of Ikmal ad-Din. Numerous sayings of Muhammad highly praise Ali, including the Hadith of the Position, in which Muhammad compares the position of Ali to himself with the position of Aaron to Moses. Ali played a pivotal role in the early years of Islam when Muslims were severely persecuted in Mecca. He slept in Muhammad's bed, pretending to be Muhammad so that the assassins who had gathered outside the prophet's house would believe that he was still there. This allowed Muhammad to leave Mecca safely and begin his immigration to Medina. The event has been referred to in Quran 2:207, which both Shia and Sunni sources interpret as referring to Ali's willingness to sacrifice himself for Muhammad.

After Muhammad's immigration, the prophet gave his beloved daughter Fatima to Ali in marriage and swore a pact of brotherhood with him, a distinction he granted to no one else but Ali. He participated in nearly all of Muhammad's battles against the polytheists and served as the prophet's secretary and deputy, as well as the flag-bearer of his army. A pivotal event took place in 632 at Ghadir Khumm, where Muhammad, shortly before his death, took Ali by the hand and delivered a speech in which he said "Whoever I am his mawla, then Ali is his mawla." The word mawla has several meanings depending on the context, including master, protector, ally, supporter, and one with authority. In Shia Islam, it is understood as Muhammad's formal designation of Ali as his successor. Sunni Islam also accepts that the event of Ghadir Khumm took place and that Muhammad made the statement about Ali. However, Sunnis interpret the word mawla in this context as referring to a close associate, friend, supporter, or one deserving loyalty and affection. Therefore, they regard the declaration as a simple affirmation of Muhammad's esteem for Ali, minimizing the event’s importance.

== Saqifa and Sunni views of Ali's Imamate ==
Regarding the succession of Ali, historians and scholars of Islamic history have generally either accepted the view of the Sunnis or rejected the truth of the matter as undiscoverable. One of the historians who has deviated from this common tradition is Wilferd Madelung. In the Encyclopaedia of Islam, Wilferd Madelung considers the main Shiite claims to be Ali's own view because he believes that Ali considered himself the most worthy person for the caliphate compared to other companions, and blamed the entire Muslim community for turning away from him, but at the same time Ali praised Abu Bakr and Umar as caliphs and condemned the destruction of their character. Madelung believes that since in the Arab customs of the time, especially the Quraysh tribe, hereditary succession was common, and the Quran emphasized the importance of blood ties between the prophets, especially the Ahl al-Bayt, and that the Ansar supported Ali's caliphate, Abu Bakr knew that a council would be formed and it leads to the election of Ali as the caliph, and for this reason he led the political currents in a calculated way to become the caliph himself. On the other hand, Laura Veccia Vaglieri in the Encyclopaedia of Islam doubt that Ali really hoped to succeed the Prophet, because the Arabs traditionally chose their leader from among the bearded ones, and Ali was only a little over thirty years old at that time and he did not have the necessary credentials to succeed Muhammad according to Arab tradition; Vaglieri believes that the Shiites, by narrating or interpreting the words attributed to Muhammad, insist that the Prophet intended to choose Ali as his successor, while there is no doubt that at the time of his last illness, Muhammad did not comment on his successor.

Wilferd Madelung writes that Ali could not have hoped to become caliph because of kinship with Muhammad; Because the Quraysh did not support the gathering of a prophet and a caliphate in one tribe. Madelung believes that this is not of the type of "coup d'etat carried out by Abu Bakr and Umar" in Saqifa incident, but stems from the deep jealousy of the Quraysh towards Ali; Therefore, Ali's only chance to moderate the affairs of the Muslims could have been his full participation in the council, which was founded by Umar. Ibn Abbas narrates that somewhere Umar told him that Ali was in fact the most worthy person to succeed Muhammad, but we were afraid of him for two reasons. When Ibn Abbas eagerly asks Umar about these two reasons, Umar responds that the first is being young and the second is Ali's great interest in the Banu Hashim family. According to this narration, all the aspirations of Ali and his supporters to establish the caliphate turned into despair. During this answer, Umar refers to the Saqifa incident. In this case, Umar refers to his belief in the formation of the council as the basis for appointing a caliph, and in practice, from now on, denounces any appointment of a caliph without consultation; Thus, the caliphate could not be monopolized by certain tribes and belonged to all the Quraysh branches.

== Wilayah and Imamate of Ali in the Quran and Hadith ==
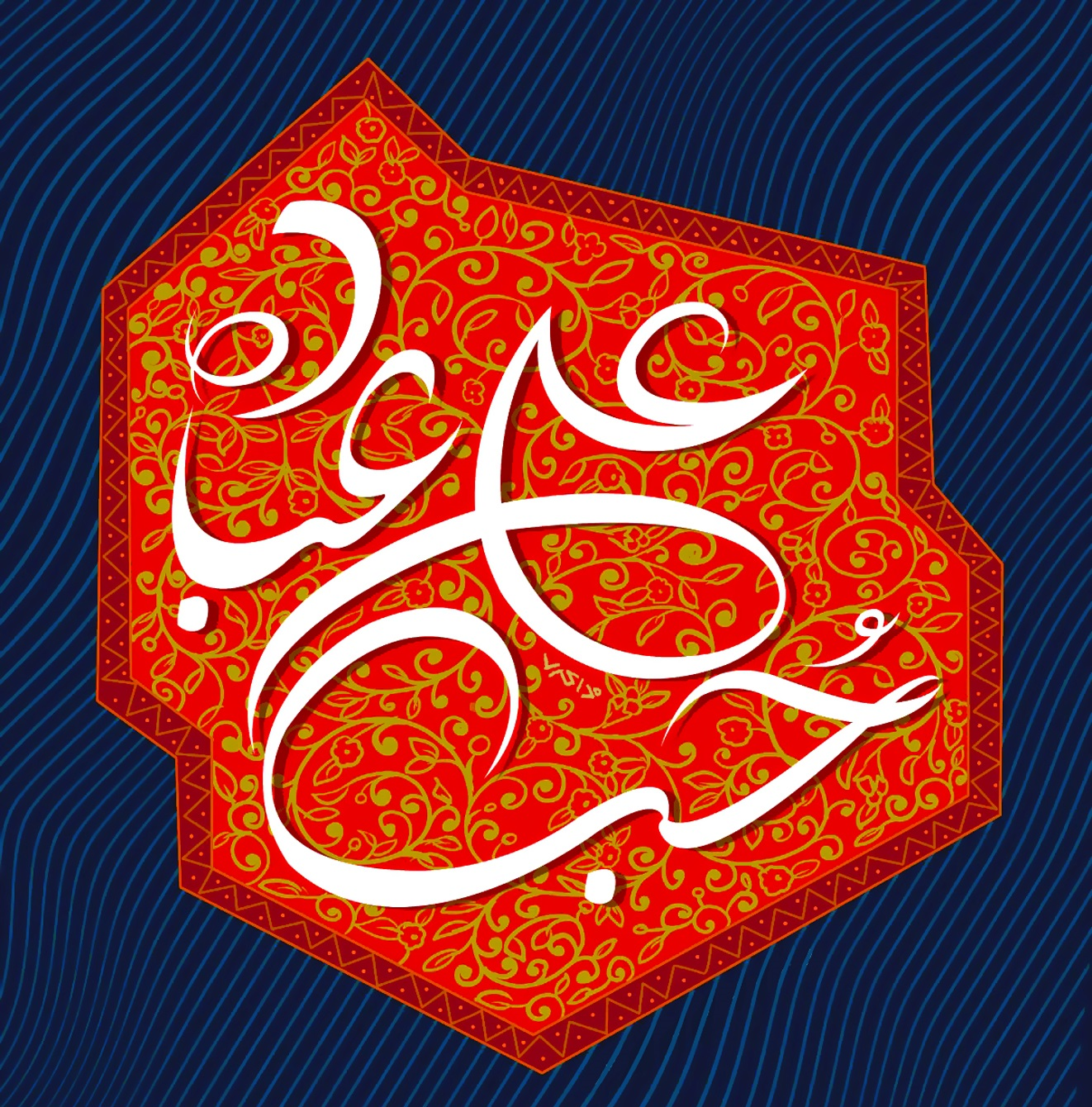
Arabic: حُبُّ عَليٍ عِبَادَة: Shiites believe that loving Ali is worship itself.

=== Verse of walaya ===
The Verse of Walaya (Quran 5:55) outlines three exclusive sources of authority (walaya) for Muslims, that is Allah, the Prophet Muhammad, and a third entity that divides Islamic thought. While Sunni Muslims generally define walaya as "friendship" or "support" and often identify the third authority as all Muslims, Shia Muslims interpret it as "spiritual authority" and identify the third authority specifically as Ali based on the context of its revelation. Consequently, Shia Islam views this verse as divine proof that Ali was the rightful, immediate successor to Muhammad, whereas Sunni Islam rejects this political succession interpretation while still frequently associating the verse with Ali's high status.

=== Obedience verse ===
The Verse of Obedience (Quran 4:59) commands Muslims to absolutely obey God, the Prophet Muhammad, and "those in authority" (uli al-amr), leading to major differences in interpretation between Islamic sects. Sunni Muslims generally identify "those in authority" as Muslim rulers, military commanders, religious scholars, or the early Caliphs Abu Bakr and Umar, viewing their authority as human. In contrast, Twelver Shia Muslims define them exclusively as the infallible Twelve Imams, extending this absolute obedience to the final hidden Mahdi.

=== Verse of ikmal al-din ===
The Verse of Ikmal ad-Din (Quran 5:3) states that God has perfected Islam, completed His blessing, and approved it as the religion for Muslims, though sects differ on the exact timing and meaning of this revelation. Shia Muslims are nearly unanimous that it was revealed in 632 CE immediately following the Event of Ghadir Khumm, viewing the perfection of religion as the direct result of Muhammad establishing Ali's spiritual authority (walaya) and designating him as his successor. In contrast, Sunni Muslims chiefly view the verse as being revealed earlier during Muhammad's Farewell Pilgrimage to signal the general completion of Islamic laws and legislation, though some Sunni sources acknowledge the connection to Ghadir Khumm while rejecting any Shia claims of political succession.

=== Al-tabligh verse ===
The Verse of Tabligh (Quran 5:67) commands Muhammad to proclaim a vital message under the promise of divine protection from opposition, drawing contrasting interpretations regarding its historical focus. Shia Muslims universally link this verse to the Event of Ghadir Khumm in 632 CE, asserting that Muhammad had delayed announcing Ali's spiritual authority (walaya) out of concern over how certain companions would react, only delivering the historic sermon after this verse guaranteed his safety and warned that failing to do so would invalidate his entire prophetic mission. In contrast, Sunni Muslims offer various alternative contexts for the revelation, such as a general validation of Muhammad’s absolute faithfulness in transmitting all divine revelations or a specific critique regarding Jews and Christians, thereby rejecting the Shia view that the verse serves as a mandate for Ali's political and spiritual succession.

=== Verse of purification ===
The Verse of Purification (Quran 33:33) states that Allah desires to remove all defilement from the Ahl al-Bayt (People of the House) and purify them completely, though Islamic sects disagree on who this title includes and its theological meaning. Shia Muslims strictly limit the Ahl al-Bayt to Muhammad, Fatima, Ali, Hasan, Husayn, and the subsequent Twelve Imams, viewing this verse as absolute divine proof of their spiritual infallibility and right to leadership. In contrast, Sunni Muslims hold varied definitions, typically including Muhammad's wives alongside his immediate bloodline, and while most scholars from both sects acknowledge that the surrounding Quranic text contextually addresses the Prophet's wives, Sunnis reject the Shia doctrine of total infallibility and political privileges for these individuals.

=== Verse of khayr ol-bareyyah ===
The Ayah of Khayr al-Bariyyah (Quran 98:7) references "the best of creatures," which major Islamic exegesis texts like Al-Mizan and Majma' al-Bayan interpret as a declaration honoring the high spiritual position of Ali and his followers (Shiites).

=== Verse of mawadda ===
The Verse of the Mawadda (Quran 42:23) commands Muhammad to ask for no reward for his message except "affection among kinsfolk" (al-qurba), creating a fundamental disagreement between Islamic traditions over the identity and religious authority of these relatives. Shia Muslims interpret al-qurba strictly as the Ahl al-Bayt, who specifically identifying them as Fatima, Ali, Hasan, Husayn, and they view this mandatory love as a divine decree requiring total religious and political obedience to them. Conversely, most Sunni authors and scholars reject this exclusive interpretation, with prominent figures like al-Tabari and modern academics noting that the Arabic phrasing does not strictly align with the Shia view, leading Sunnis to argue that the verse instead commands a general affection for kinsfolk or implies drawing closer to God through obedience.

== Muhammadan guardianship ==
While Muhammad holds the position of prophethood and guardianship at the same time, Ali is the perfect guardian, hence he is called "the guardian of God". As Haydar Amuli says, guardianship is the Batin and inner aspect of prophecy. Henry Corbin says that just as the manifest of prophecy must come to an end in a person and that person is Muhammad, the interior aspect of that which is Wilayah must also come to an end in the manifestation of an earthly person. This person is Ali, who has the closest spiritual closeness to Muhammad. That is, the Muhammadan guardianship is the esoteric and hidden aspect of the prophethood of all the prophets that has emerged with Ali.

That is why most Sufi teachings bring their spiritual lineage to Ali and start from him. Henry Corbin says that even if there is controversy in the historical citation of these spiritual dynasties, it is more indicative of their intention to connect to the origin of the Wilayah.

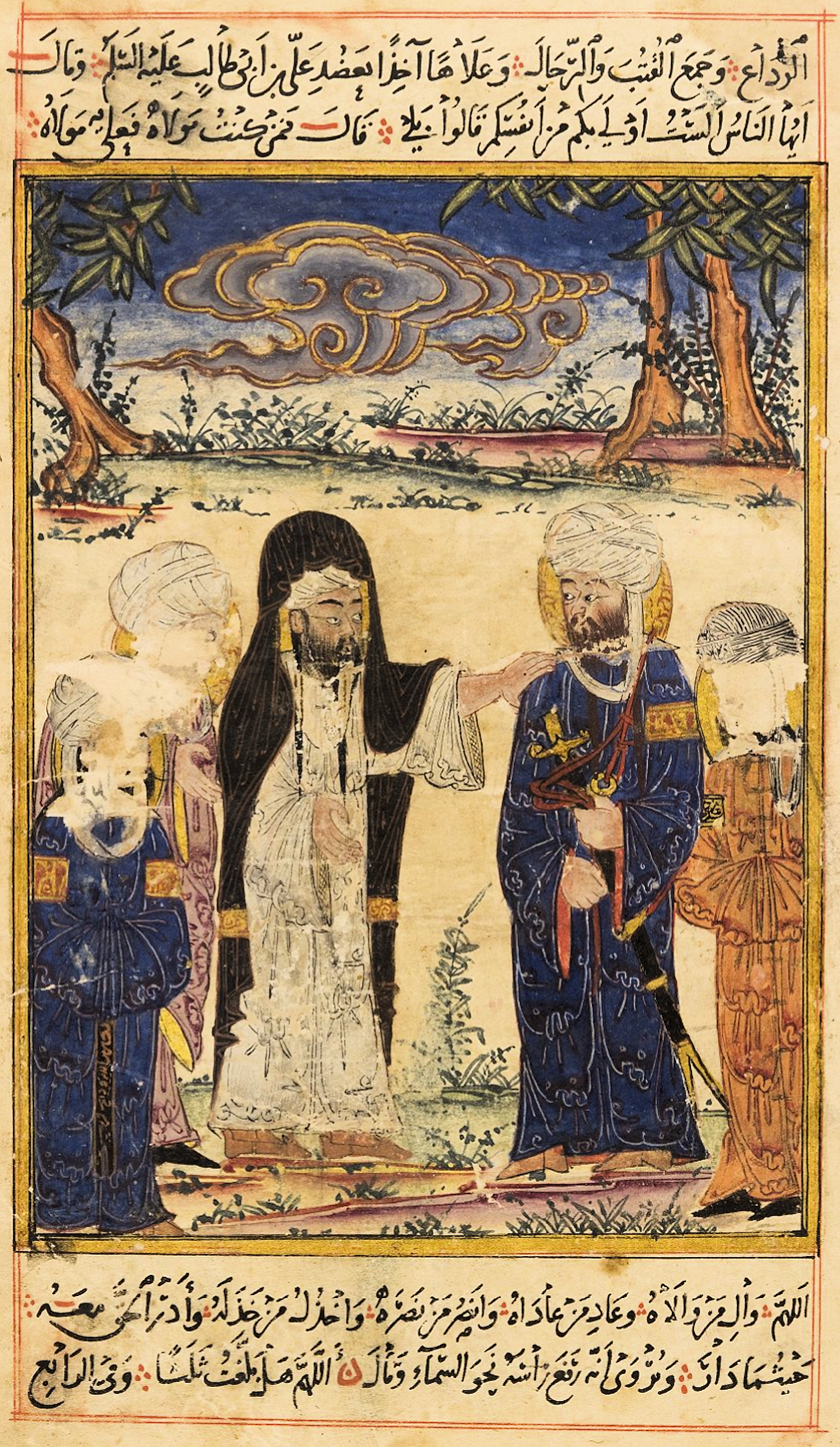
Painting of the appointment of Ali by Muhammad in Ghadir Khumm, from the book The Remaining Signs of Past Centuries by Al-Biruni, 1307 or 1308 AD.

== Communication of Imamate and Wilayah ==
When Muhammad, Prophet of Islam, returned from the farewell pilgrimage in 632 AD, he delivered a sermon on Ali that was interpreted very differently by Shiites and Sunnis. According to the narration of these both groups, Muhammad said that Ali is his heir and brother, and that whoever accepts the Prophet as his mawla (leader or trusted friend) should also accept Ali as his mawla. Shiites consider this expression to mean appointing Ali as the successor of the Prophet and the first Imam. The Sunnis, on the other hand, consider this statement to be merely an expression of the Prophet's closeness to Ali and also an expression of his desire that Ali, as his cousin and adopted son, succeed him in his family responsibilities after his death.

== Proportion of Caliphate and Wilayah and Imamate ==
Ali was the fourth caliph in the history of Islam. However, what has happened historically has no effect on the Imamate. Just as others who have held the position of caliphate do not benefit from the Imamate. Also, the lack of caliphate position does not diminish the rank of the Imam. Henry Corbin says that in Shi'ism the Imamate goes beyond the competition of families for power. Imamate does not depend on the confession and acceptance of the people. Rather, it is rooted in the divine splendour of the Imam, which people are unable to understand.

== Historical differentiation of Ali Shiites ==
Wilferd Madelung says that after the Kharijites separated, Ali's supporters pledged allegiance to him again based on Ali's guardianship. This time, referring to the hadith of Ghadir narrated from Muhammad, they pledged to be the friend of the one with whom he is friends and the enemy of the one with whom he is the enemy (وَلِيٌّ لِمَنْ وَالاهُ وَ عَدُوٌّ لِمَنْ عَادَاهُ, make friends with those who love him and oppose those who deny him). Ali stated that adherence to the traditions of Muhammad should be added to the condition of allegiance, but did not accept the traditions of Abu Bakr and Umar as the condition of allegiance. But the Kharijites said that allegiance should be based on the Quran and the traditions of Muhammad, Abu Bakr and Umar, not the guardianship of a particular person. Probably at this time, Ali publicly announced hadith of Ghadir and asked the people who had witnessed Ghadir Khumm to testify. Twelve or thirteen of the companions testified that they had heard the hadith from Muhammad that Ali was the "mawla" of whom Muhammad was the mawla (مَنْ كُنْتُ مَوْلَاهُ فَهَذَا عَلِيٌّ مَوْلَاهُ, Translated as For whoever I am his mawla, Ali is his mawla). Thus, Ali explicitly established a religious authority beyond Abu Bakr and Umar.

In the following years, especially after the fall of Egypt and the killing of Shiites there, Ali more explicitly expressed his views, including about the previous caliphs and his right to the caliphate of'Muhammad, in a letter to five of his Shiites, the text of which is in the book Al-Qaaraat by Ibrahim ibn Muhammad Saqafi Kufi.

== See also ==
- Ali in the Quran
- Ali in the Hadith
- Assassination of Ali
- Eid al-Ghadir
- Timeline of Ali's life
- Hadith al-Raya
- Laylat al-mabit
