= Eid al-Ghadir =

Shia holiday

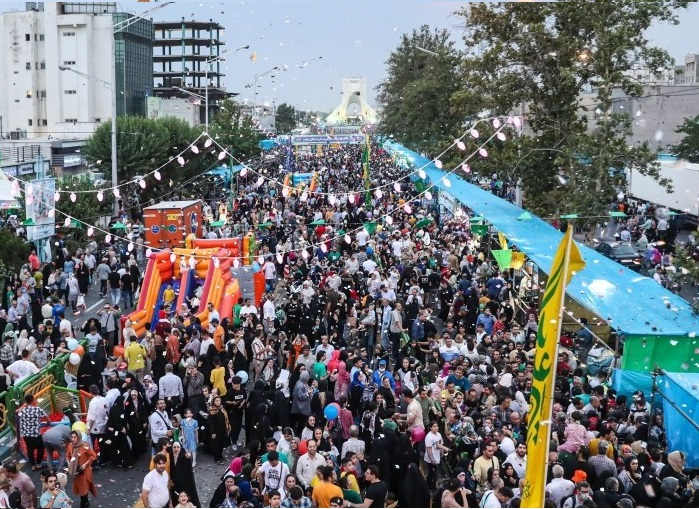
- 10-km-long Eid al-Ghadir celebration in Tehran, 2024
- Also called: Eid al-Ghadeer; Yawm al-mithaq (Day of the Covenant)
- Observed by: Twelver Shi'ites, Zaydis, Ismailis, Alawites
- Type: Shia Islam
- Significance: Commemorates the Ghadir Khumm, when Muhammad is believed by Shia Muslims to have appointed Ali as his successor
- Observances: Prayers, gift-giving, festive meals, as well as reciting the Du'a Nudba,
- Date: 18 Dhu'l-Hijja

Eid al-Ghadir (Arabic: عید الغدیر, romanized: ʿīd al-ghadīr, lit. 'feast of the pond') is a major religious festival observed by Shia Muslims on 18 Dhu al-Hijjah, the twelfth month of the Islamic calendar. It commemorates the Event of Ghadir Khumm, during which the Prophet Muhammad declared Ali his mawla in front of a large gathering of Muslims. In Shia Islam, the declaration is understood as Muhammad's designation of Ali as his successor and the first Imam. The festival is particularly significant in Shia Islam and is regarded as one of the most important religious observances.

Shia Muslims commemorate the day through prayers, sermons, religious gatherings, charitable acts, and the exchange of congratulations and gifts. Some communities also hold public celebrations and distribute food and sweets. The day is also known by several other names, including Eid al-Wilayah (“Festival of Guardianship”), Eid-e Bozorg-e Elāhi (“The Greatest Divine Eid”), Eid Ahl al-Bayt Muhammad (“The Eid of the Household of Muhammad”), Yawm al-Wilayah (“Day of Guardianship”), and Ashraf al-Aʿyād (“The Most Exalted of Festivals”).

== Religious background ==
The event of Ghadir Khumm occurred ten years after the migration (Hijrah), when the Islamic prophet Muhammad ordered his followers to call upon people everywhere to join him in his first and last pilgrimage. Islamic scholars believe more than seventy thousand people followed Muhammad on his way to Mecca, where, on the fourth day of the month of Dhu'l-Hijja, there were more than one hundred thousand Muslims present for his entry into the city.

While returning from this pilgrimage, on 18 Dhu'l-Hijja 10 AH (March 632 CE) at an area known as Ghadir Khumm, Muhammad delivered a well-known sermon during which he called up his cousin, brother, and son-in-law Ali ibn Abi Talib and declared, "for whomever I am Mawla, Ali is also their Mawla". The meaning of the word Mawla can be interpreted as "master", and thus many see the sermon as being the official designation of Ali as Muhammad's successor.

As a result, the date of the sermon is considered to be one of the foundational events of Shia Islam, with the anniversary becoming one of its most important annual celebrations as "Eid al-Ghadir". To be more precise, Muhammad declared "Do I have more authority over you than you do yourselves?" They responded with "Yes oh prophet of Allah" He continued with " Then, to whomsoever I am Mawla, Ali is also their Mawla". While the meaning of the word Mawla can be interpreted as "friend" (as it has many meanings), the question asked set the context for it to be interpreted as "master" and in turn suggested “leader”.

== Celebration ==
In a hadith attributed to Muhammad recorded by Ibn Babawayh, Muhammad considers Ghadir Khum to be the best and highest of the festivals of his Ummah. Shia Muslims throughout the world celebrate this event annually with diverse customs. It is held in different countries, including Iran, India, Pakistan, Azerbaijan, Iraq, UAE, Yemen, Afghanistan, Lebanon, Turkey, Bahrain, and Syria. Shia Muslims may also celebrate Eid Ghadir in Europe and the Americas, including the United States, Canada, United Kingdom, Germany, France.

According to some historical accounts, the commemoration of the event of Ghadir Khum has been celebrated as a festival since the early centuries of Islam. It was first formally observed during the Buyid era, and later, during the Safavid era, Eid al-Ghadir was one of the largest religious festivals celebrated. The celebration also gained special importance during the Qajar era, as on this day, an official greeting ceremony was held with great ceremony in the court. The custom of greeting the king on this day continued during the Pahlavi era.

In 2022, a 10-km long festival was held in Tehran marking the Eid al-Ghadir ceremony, with hundreds of thousands of the people pouring out into Valiasr Street and the nearby streets.

In 2024, a massive celebration was held in multiple Yemeni provinces where fireworks, bands, and speeches were held. In recent years, Eid Al-Ghadir (known in Yemen as Yom Al-Wilaya) has been celebrated more than ever since the Zaydi Shia Government took over Yemen. Also in the same year, the Iraqi Council of Representatives declared Eid al-Ghadir to be an official public holiday, having being persuaded by National Shiite Movement leader Muqtada al-Sadr to do so.

According to historical narrations, Hassan ibn Ali used to hold ceremonies in Kufa on the day of Ghadir while Ali ibn Abi Talib would attend accompanied by a group of his followers. After the ceremony, Hassan ibn Ali would distribute gifts to the people. Among the customs reported in narrations are greeting, hand shaking, wearing new clothes, using perfume, making donations, helping others, saying prayers, feeding others, making others happy and giving gifts.

== See also ==
- Succession to Muhammad
- Event of Ghadir
- The verse of Wilayah
- Imamate and guardianship of Ali ibn Abi Talib
