= Timeline of Ali's life =

This article is about timeline of Ali bin Abi Talib, who was the cousin and son-in-law of the Islamic prophet Muhammad. He served as the first Imam in Shia Islam and the fourth Rashidun caliph. During Muhammad's time, Ali also served as his deputy and secretary.

== Timeline ==
- 17 March 599 coincided with Thirteenth of Rajab, 24 BH: Birth of Ali ibn Abi Talib in the Ka'ba, in the city of Mecca.
- 610: Ali converted to Islam soon before the first revelation of the Quran.
- 613: Yawm al-Inzar: Muhammad invited the Banu Hashim to Islam; Ali alone accepted his call.
- 617–619: Meccan boycott of the Hashemites
- 619:Year of Sorrow:Death of Abu Talib, Ali's father.
- September 622: Laylat al-mabit: Ali risked his life by sleeping in Muhammad's bed to impersonate him and thwart an assassination plot, so that Muhammad could escape from Mecca in safety and migrate to Medina.
- 622: Ali migrated with his wife, Fatima Zahra and Umm Kulthum bint Ali, and another women.
- 622 or 623:The prophet chose him as his brother.
- 623: Ali married with Fatima Zahra, Muhammad's daughter.
- 624
  - March 17: Battle of Badr: Ali first distinguished himself as a warrior and killed about 20 to 22 pagans.
  - Expulsion of the Bani Qainuqa Jews from Medina.
- 625:
  - Birth of Hasan ibn Ali, the second Shia Imam.
  - Battle of Uhud: Ali destroyed the standard bearers and when the army of Islam was defeated and most of the Muslims had fled Ali was one of the few Muslims who defended Muhammad.
  - Expulsion of Banu Nadir Jews from Medina.
- 626:
  - Birth of Husayn ibn Ali, the third Shia Imam.
  - Expedition of Banu Mustaliq.
- 627
  - Battle of the Trench: Ali ibn Abi Talib triumphed in combat over Arabs' hero, Amr ibn Wodd, and killed him.
  - Killing and enslavement of Banu Quraiza.
- 628
  - Treaty of Hudaybiyyah
  - Battle of Khaybar: Ali was the standard-bearer and conqueror of the Khaybar's castle.
  - Birth of Zaynab bint Ali
- 629
  - Participating in The first pilgrimage with the Prophet.
  - Death of Ali's brother Ja'far ibn Abi Talib in the Battle of Mu'tah
- 630
  - Conquest of Mecca:Ali was the standard-bearer.
  - Battle of Hunayn
  - Battle of Autas
  - Siege of Ta'if
  - Operation against Banu Tayy
- 631
  - Mubahela with the Christian of Najran
  - Expedition against Banu Rumla
  - Operation against Banu Zubuda
  - Mission to Yemen
- 632
  - Participation in Farewell pilgrimage at Mecca.
  - Event of Ghadir Khumm
  - Death of Muhammad
  - Abu Bakr assumes power as the first Rashidun caliph
  - Death of Fatimah, Ali's wife.
- 644: Umar, the second Rashidun caliph, was assassinated. Ali was one of the electoral council to choose the third caliph
- 648: Birth of Al-Abbas ibn Ali
- 656:
  - Siege and assassination of Uthman, the third Rashidun caliph.
  - Election of Ali as the fourth Rashidun caliph.
  - Beginning of the First Fitna(first Islamic civil war).
  - Battle of Bassorah
- 657:Ali shifted the capital of Rashidun empire from Medina to Kufa in Iraq.
- May–July 657: Battle of Siffin
- 658:
  - The Arbitration
  - Revolt of Kharijits.
  - July 658: Battle of Nahrawan
- 659:
  - Ali's governor of Egypt was defeated and Egypt was conquered by 'Amr ibn al-'As
  - Revolt of Khurrit ibn Rashid
  - Muawiyah I plundered Iraq
- 660:
  - Muawiyah plundered Hijaz and Yemen, but later withdrew
- 28 January 661 coincided with Twenty-first of Ramadan: Ali dead in Kufa and buried in Najaf two days after he was struck by Abd-al-Rahman ibn Muljam in the Great Mosque of Kufa.
  - Al-Hasan, election as Caliph after Ali's death in 661.
  - Muawiyah I declared himself as caliph in Damascus

== See also ==
- History of Islam
- Timeline of Islamic history
- Muhammad in Mecca
- Muhammad in Medina
- Muhammad after the conquest of Mecca
- Imamate and guardianship of Ali
