= Succession to Muhammad =

Controversy in Islam

The issue of succession following the death of the Islamic prophet Muhammad is the central issue in the schisms that divided the early Muslim community in the first century of Islamic history into numerous schools and branches. The two most prominent branches that emerged from these divisions are Sunni and Shia as well as Ibadi branches of Islam. Sunni Islam and Ibadi Islam asserts that Abu Bakr rightfully succeeded Muhammad through a legitimate process of election. In contrast, Shia Islam holds that Ali ibn Abi Talib was Muhammad's designated successor.

These differing viewpoints on succession stem from varying interpretations of early Islamic history and the hadiths, which are the attributed sayings of Muhammad. Sunni Muslims contend that Muhammad did not explicitly appoint a successor, leaving the choice of leadership to the Muslim community. They recognize the legitimacy of Abu Bakr's rule, who was elected at Saqifah, as well as that of his successors, collectively known as the Rashidun caliphs.

Conversely, Twelver Shia Muslims believe that Muhammad had explicitly designated Ali as his heir, notably during the Event of Ghadir Khumm, following the revelation of verse 5:67 in the Quran. According to Twelver Shia doctrine, the subsequent rulers after Muhammad are considered illegitimate, with Ali and his lineage of eleven divinely-appointed Twelve Imams being the rightful successors. The last of these Imams, Mahdi, entered occultation while he was still a young child in 260 AH (874 CE) due to threats from his enemies. The anticipated return of Mahdi holds significance for most Muslims, although different sects maintain varying perspectives on this matter. In Shia Islam, the awaited Mahdi refers to the return of this lost Imam, while in Sunni Islam, it refers to a savior who follows a normal birth and growth phase. However, both groups share the view that the Mahdi will revive Islam as the inheritor of Muhammad's spiritual legacy.

To put it simply, Sunnis argue that Muhammad did not leave behind a material inheritance, and that what he left behind belonged to the public treasury and should be used for the poor of the Muslim community. Shiites, on the other hand, argue that these assets are the right of Muhammad's descendants, and that withholding them is an injustice and a usurpation of rights. Furthermore, Shiites claim that Muhammad's spiritual legacy and representation are also the right of his descendants through Ali and Fatima, and that this has been usurped, while Sunnis maintain that this is a merit-based representation supported by consensus within the Muslim community.

== Historiography ==
Most Islamic history was transmitted orally until after the rise of the Abbasid Caliphate. Historical works of later Muslim writers include the traditional biographies of Muhammad and quotations attributed to him—the sira and hadith literature, last one on the basis of isnad- which provide further information on Muhammad's life. The earliest surviving written sira is Sirat Rasul Allah (Life of God's Messenger) by Ibn Ishaq (d. 761 or 767 CE). Although the original work is lost, portions of it survive in the recensions of Ibn Hisham (d. 833) and Al-Tabari (d. 923). Many scholars accept these biographies although their accuracy is uncertain. Studies by Schacht and Goldziher have led the scholars to distinguish between legal and historical traditions. According to Watt, although legal traditions could have been invented, historical material may have been primarily subject to "tendential shaping" rather than being invented. While classical Islamic scholarship developed methodologies such as the science of biography and the "chain of imputation" to evaluate the reliability -usually varies according to religious sects- of these manaqib narratives, prominent figures like Ibn Khaldun introduced critical historiographical methods, emphasizing the importance of context and the systematic evaluation of historical data. On the other hand modern Western scholarship seeks to support traditional narratives with objective data such as archaelogical findings and supporting external sources.(see also: Historical criticism)

The compilation of hadiths is a vital element of the first three centuries of Islamic history. Early Western scholars mistrusted the later narrations and reports, regarding them as fabrications. Caetani considered the attribution of historical reports to Ibn Abbas and Aisha as mostly fictitious, preferring accounts reported without isnad by early historians such as Ibn Ishaq. Madelung has rejected the indiscriminate dismissal of everything not included in "early sources", instead judging later narratives in the context of history and compatibility with events and figures. The only contemporaneous source is The Book of Sulaym ibn Qays (Kitab al-Saqifah) by Sulaym ibn Qays (died 75-95 AH or 694-714 CE). This collection of hadith and historical reports from the first century of the Islamic calendar narrates in detail events relating to the succession. However, there have been doubts regarding the reliability of the collection, with some believing that it was a later creation given that the earliest mention of the text only appears in the eleventh century. Limited archaeological evidence suggests that the Rashidun period lacked a distinct Islamic identity, and that its early conquests were likely a secular Arabic expansion rather than a religiously-Islamic driven expansion.

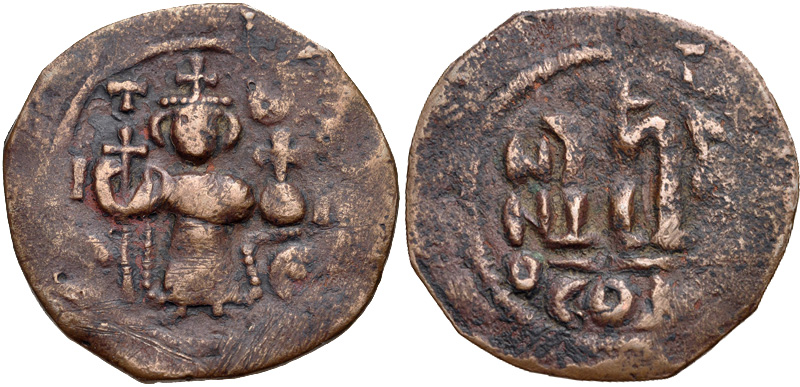
A "Pseudo-Byzantine" coin with depictions of the Byzantine Emperor Constans II holding the cross-tipped staff and globus cruciger. There was no specific Islamic-religious identity and political stance with sharp boundaries in the early Islamic period.

== Historical overview ==
=== Saqifa ===
In the immediate aftermath of Muhammad's death in 11/632, a gathering of the Ansar (Medinan Muslims) took place at the Saqifa (lit. 'courtyard') of the Banu Sa'ida clan, while Muhammad's close relatives were preparing for his burial. The conventional wisdom is that the Ansar met there to decide on a new leader for the Muslim community among themselves, with the intentional exclusion of the Muhajirun. The leading candidate was possibly Sa'd ibn Ubada, a companion of Muhammad and a chief of the Banu Khazraj, the majority tribe of the Ansar. Their motive has been questioned by Madelung and Jafri, who contend that the Ansar only wanted to re-establish their control over their city, Medina. When they found out about the meeting via an informant, Abu Bakr and Umar rushed to the Saqifa, accompanied by Abu Ubaida. These three companions were the only members of the Muhajirun in the Saqifa meeting, possibly accompanied by some relatives and servants. Once there, Abu Bakr warned the Ansar that Arabs will not recognize the rule of anyone outside of Muhammad's tribe, the Quraysh. The Muhajirun, Abu Bakr argued, were the best of Arabs in lineage and location, had accepted Islam earlier, and were closer to Muhammad in kinship. Abu Bakr then reportedly invited the Ansar to choose Umar or Abu Ubaida as Muhammad's successor. Since his two candidates lacked any realistic chance of success, this manoeuvre presented Abu Bakr as an acceptable alternative to Umar and Abu Ubaida for the Ansar.

Someone countered Abu Bakr with the suggestion that the Quraysh and the Ansar should choose their separate rulers among themselves. A heated argument ensued until Umar asked Abu Bakr to stretch his hand and pledged allegiance to the latter, followed by others. In the process, Sa'd was beaten into submission by Umar, which indicates that a substantial number of the Ansar must have initially refused to follow Umar's lead. Otherwise, there would have been no need to beat up their chief Sa'd, according to Madelung.

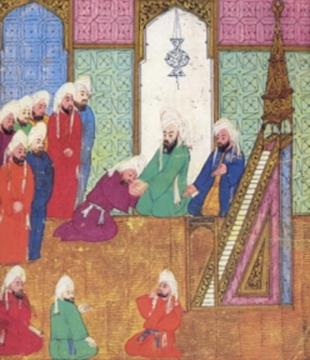
A Persian miniature illustrating the vowing to Abu Bakr at Saqifah

Muhammad had been buried by the time the Saqifa meeting ended, with the exclusion of Abu Bakr from the funeral rites. The authority of Abu Bakr was precarious at first, until Umar secured the pledges of allegiance from the Medinans with help from the Banu Aslam and Banu Aws tribes. In chronological order, Abu Bakr obtained the backing of Uthman and of the Banu Umayyad, of Sa'd and Abd al-Rahman ibn Awf, of the Banu Zuhra, of Zubayr, and finally of Ali.

The Banu Hashim and some companions of Muhammad gathered at Ali's house in protest after learning about the appointment of Abu Bakr. Among them were Muhammad's uncle Abbas and Zubayr. These held Ali to be the rightful successor to Muhammad, possibly referring to the announcement by the latter at the Ghadir Khumm. Ordered by Abu Bakr, Umar then led an armed mob to Ali's residence and threatened to set the house on fire if Ali and his supporters would not pledge their allegiance to Abu Bakr. The scene soon grew violent, but the mob retreated without Ali's pledge after his wife Fatima pleaded with them. During this time period Madelung says that Ali could see nothing but hypocrisy in Abu Bakr's tears and his claims to love Muhammad's family.

Abu Bakr soon placed a boycott on Ali and also on Muhammad's clan, the Banu Hashim, to abandon their support for Ali. The boycott was successful, and those who initially supported Ali gradually turned away and pledged their allegiance to Abu Bakr. Most likely, Ali did not pledge allegiance to Abu Bakr until his wife Fatima died within six months of her father Muhammad. In Shia sources, the death (and miscarriage) of the young Fatima are attributed to an attack on her house to subdue Ali at the order of Abu Bakr. Sunnis categorically reject these allegations. After Fatima's death and in the absence of popular support, Ali is said to have relinquished his claims to the caliphate for the sake of the unity of a nascent Islam, In contrast with Muhammad's lifetime, Ali is believed to have retired from public life during the caliphates of Abu Bakr, Umar, and Uthman, which has been interpreted as a silent censure of the first three caliphs.

Umar later criticized the Saqifa affair, "The oath of allegiance for Abu Bakr was a falta [i.e., a precipitate and ill-considered deal], but God averted the evil of it." This was a reference to the exclusion of the majority of the Muhajirun and particularly Muhammad's kin, whose participation was vital for a legitimate outcome at the Saqifa. Possibly because of its questionable legal authority, Umar also warned Muslims against ever following the example of Saqifa. Similar concerns about the legitimacy of the Saqifa are raised by contemporary authors. Some have further criticized the Saqifa affair as a "backroom deal" and a "coup" which was heavily influenced by the pre-Islamic tribal politics. The evil of the falta which, Umar thought, had been averted by God would erupt later in the form of the First Fitna, suggests Madelung.

=== Rashidun caliphs ===
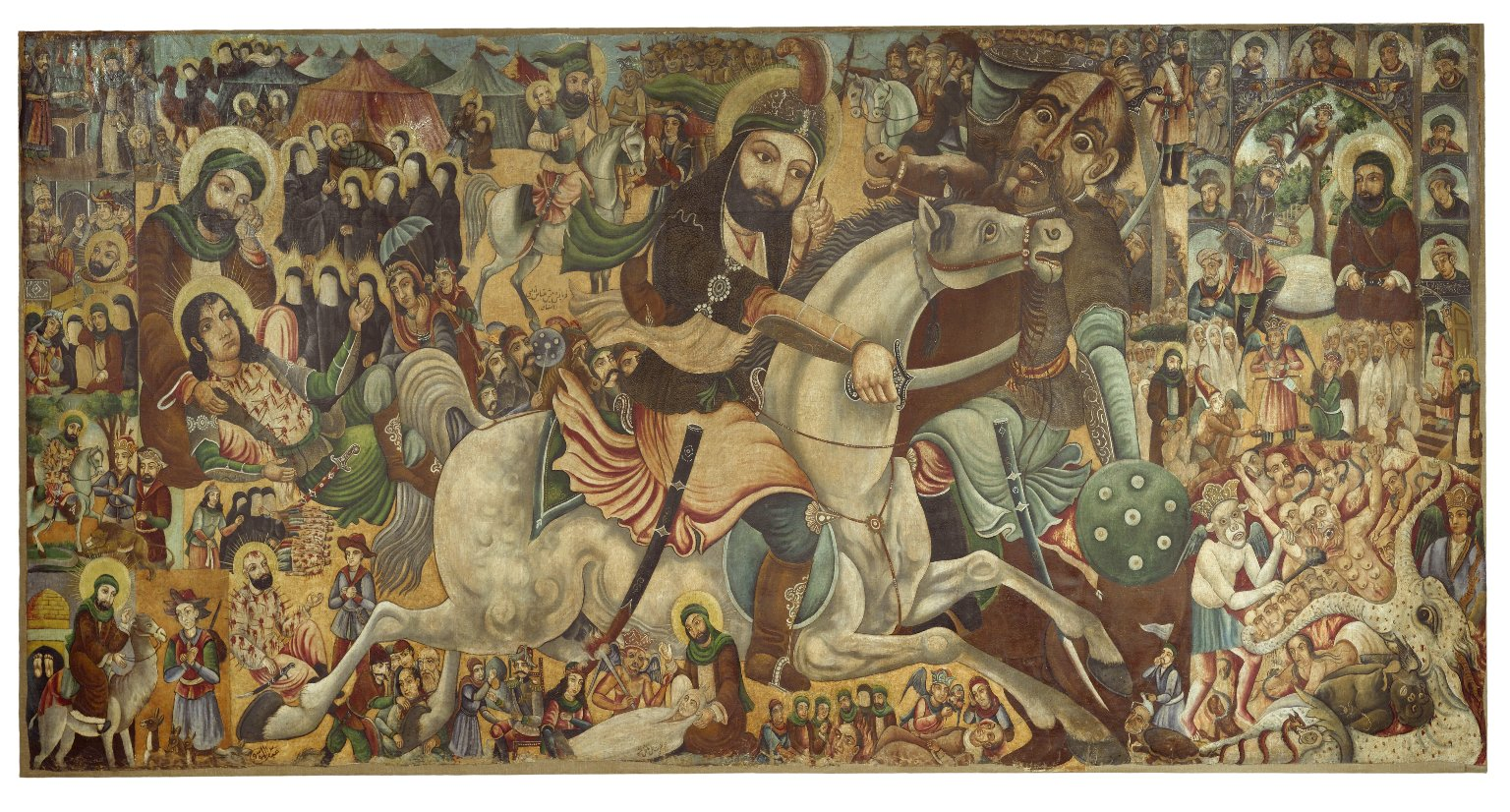
Battle of Karbala, an oil painting by Abbas Al-Musavi

Abu Bakr adopted the title of khalifat rasul Allah, commonly translated as the successor to the messenger of God. This was shortened to khalifa, from which the word caliph arose. Abu Bakr's tenure as the caliph lasted just over two years. Though he was appointed caliph by those at Saqifah, Abu Bakr designated Umar as his successor, reportedly against the advice of the Quraysh elders. Umar was instrumental in the ascension of Abu Bakr to the caliphate.

In 644, on his deathbed, Umar tasked a committee of six with choosing the next caliph among themselves. The committee included Ali, Uthman ibn Affan, and his brother-in-law, Abd al-Rahman ibn Awf. The tie breaker vote belonged to Abd al-Rahman, Othman's brother-in-law, and it has been suggested that the makeup and configuration of this committee left a small possibility for the nomination of Ali.

In the final showdown, Abd al-Rahman offered the caliphate to Ali on two conditions: first, he should follow the way of the Quran and the Sunnah of Muhammad, and second, he should follow the example of Abu Bakr and Umar. Ali is said to have accepted the first condition but declined the second one, adding that he would rely only on his own judgment in the absence of any precedent from the Quran or the Sunnah. Abd al-Rahman then presented the same conditions to Uthman who readily accepted them. It has been suggested that Abd al-Rahman was well aware of Ali's disagreements with the past two caliphs and that Ali, known for his sincerity, would have inevitably rejected the second condition.

Uthman's reign was marked with widespread accusations of nepotism. Under Uthman's rule, his tribe, the Banu Umayya, is said to have regained its pre-Islamic influence and power. Uthman installed his relatives, including his cousin, Muawiya, to rule the Islamic territories. According to Glassé, Uthman was assassinated by rebels in 656, in a climate of growing dissension against the despotism of the Banu Umayya.

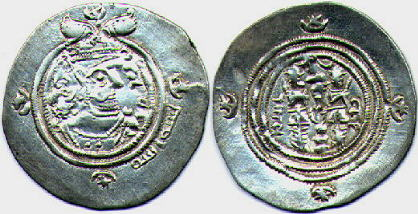
Sasanid style coins during the Rashidun period, unlike known historical figures such as Ibn Zubayr and Mu'awiya I, there are no coins minted in the name of these caliphs that could be evidence of political predominancy. (crescent-star, fire altar, depictions of Khosrow II, Arabic bismillāh in margin)

One of the rare archaeological findings from the early Islamic period; transcription of a undated rock inscription found in Saudi Arabia in 2012, without definitions such as Caliph or Amir al-Mu'minin, claimed to be Umar's signature

Shortly after the assassination of Uthman, the caliphate was offered to Ali, who declined the position at first. Aslan attributes Ali's initial refusal to the polarizing impact of Uthman's murder on the community, while Durant writes that, "[Ali] shrank from drama in which religion had been displaced by politics, and devotion by intrigue." In the absence of any serious opposition and urged particularly by the Ansar and the Iraqi delegations, Ali eventually accepted the first pledges of allegiance in the Prophet's Mosque in Medina. It appears that Ali personally did not force anyone for a pledge though the strong pro-Ali atmosphere of Medina might have exerted some pressure on his opponents. In particular, Sa'ad ibn Abi Waqqas, Abdullah ibn Umar and Usama ibn Zayd refused to acknowledge the authority of Ali. Talha and Zubayr, both companions of Muhammad with ambitions for the high office, likely gave their pledges though they later broke their oaths, claiming that they had pledged their allegiance to Ali under public pressure. There is, however, less evidence for violence here than in Abu Bakr's election, according to Madelung.

Ali inherited the internal problems of Uthman's reign. Immediately after his election, Ali quelled an armed insurrection led by Aisha, a widow of Muhammad, and Talhah and Zubayr. Afterwards, Uthman's governor of Syria, Muawiya, declared war on Ali and a long and indecisive civil war ensued. The first four caliphs are referred to by the Sunni as the Rashidun (rightly-guided) caliphs, though only Ali is recognized by the Twelver Shia.

=== Later successions ===
Abu Bakr's view that the caliphate should remain within the Quraysh tribe persisted in later generations. According to Cooperson, however, this definition of the caliphate had its costs. First, it facilitated the rise of the Umayyads who, despite being of the Quraysh, were among the most powerful enemies of Muhammad before their late conversion to Islam. Their rise to power marginalized both the Muhajirun and the Ansar, and reduced the caliphate, as an institution, to no more than a worldly kingship. Second, according to Cooperson, was the exclusion of Ali, who, insofar as the kinship of the Quraysh with Muhammad was concerned, had an arguably better claim to the caliphate. Ali eventually became caliph, but not in time to stop the rise of the Umayyads.

After the assassination of Ali in 661, his eldest son, Hasan, was elected caliph in Kufa. Muawiya then marched on Kufa with his army, whereas Hasan's military response to Muawiya suffered defections in large numbers, largely facilitated by military commanders and tribal chiefs who had been swayed to Muawiya's side by promises and offers of money. Under attack from Muawiya and after a failed assassination attempt on his life, a wounded Hasan ceded the caliphate to Muawiya in 661. Notably, under their agreement, it is said that Muawiya appointed Hasan as his successor. However, Hasan died in 669 at the age of forty six, before Muawiya. It is believed that he was poisoned at the instigation of Muawiya.

Before his death in 680, Muawiya arranged for the succession of his son, Yazid, who is often remembered as a debaucher who openly violated the Islamic norms. In particular, Muawiya summoned a council (shura) of the Muslim elite in 676 and won their support through flattery, bribes, and threats. Notably, Muawiya was unsuccessful in securing the oath of allegiance from Hasan's younger brother, Husayn, who, after Muawiya's death, publicly denounced Yazid's legitimacy. In 680, after surrounding them in Karbala and cutting off their access to water for multiple days, Yazid's forces slaughtered Husayn, alongside his family and his small group of supporters. The women and children were taken prisoner and marched to Kufa and then Damascus, some of whom are said to have perished from mistreatment. The tragic death of Husayn and his supporters marked the Second Fitna, which finalized the schism between the Sunni and the Shia. The latter consider Husayn as their third Imam.

The succession subsequently transformed under the Umayyads from an elective/appointed position to being effectively hereditary within the family.

== In the Quran ==
=== Past prophets ===
The Quran, as the central religious text of Islam, does not explicitly identify a successor to Muhammad, though it grants key privileges to the families of the past prophets. After the past prophets, their descendants become the spiritual and material heirs to them in the Quran. The scripture describes how the past prophets prayed for (and were granted) the divine favor to be succeeded by their close kin in kingship, in rule, in wisdom, in imamate, etc. From Noah to Jesus, Madelung notes that the prophets of the Israelites were all descendants of one family. In particular, Solomon inherited from David both his kingship and his prophetic wisdom in verses 27:16 and 21:78, and John the Baptist inherited from Zechariah in verses 19:5-6.

==== Abraham ====
Verse 2:124 includes the exchange, "[God] said [to Abraham], 'I shall make you an imam for the people.' He said: 'And also of my off-spring?' [God] said: 'My compact will not comprise the evil-doers.'" God's pledge in this verse thus extends to just descendants of Abraham. Elsewhere in verse 29:27, God praises Abraham, "And We gave him Isaac and Jacob and placed among his progeny prophethood and the Book."

==== Moses ====
In verses 20:29-32, Moses asks God to include his brother Aaron in his prophetic mission. His prayer is answered by God, as evidenced by verses 20:36-42, 25:35, and 28:35. Aaron thus becomes the chosen associate of Moses in his prophetic mission and in revelation, as described in verses 21:48-9 and 2:248.

=== Muhammad ===
Similar to the past prophets, Muhammad's family has an eminent position in the Quran. Elevating them above common Muslims, a state of purity is bestowed upon Muhammad's kin in verses 8:41, 59:7, the verse of purification 33:33, and the verse of mawadda 42:23 by some accounts. The praise in the verse of purification and the privileges in the verse of mubahala are specific to Muhammad's daughter Fatima, her husband Ali, and their two sons Hasan and Husayn, by Shia and some Sunni accounts. These five are known as the Ahl al-Bayt (lit. 'people of the household') in Shia, though various Sunni interpretations are broader and often include Muhammad's wives as well.

Insofar as the Quran reflects the views of Muhammad, Madelung concludes, he could have not seen his succession differently from the earlier prophets or considered Abu Bakr as his natural successor. This is because, he argues, the succession of prophets is a matter that is settled by divine selection in the Quran. In particular, God selects their successors from their own families, whether or not those successors become prophets themselves. Jafri and Abbas develop similar arguments.

=== Verse of wilaya ===
Also known as the verse of wilaya, verse 5:55 of the Quran is translated by The Study Quran as, "Your protector [wali] is only [innama] God, and His Messenger, and those who believe, who perform the prayer and give alms [zakat] while bowing down." Some Sunni exegeses link this verse to the hostility of the Jewish tribes in Medina, while Shia and some Sunni sources consider this verse a specific reference to the occasion where Ali gave away his ring to a beggar while he was bowing in worship. In particular, Nasr et al. suggest that the frequent association of this verse with Ali in early Sunni sources strongly support its authenticity.

For the Shia, wilaya in this verse is interpreted as spiritual authority. The verse of wilaya thus describes Ali as the rightful authority over the believers, after God and Muhammad, and underlines his right to succeed Muhammad as the spiritual and political leader of the Muslim community. Alternatively, those Sunni authors who acknowledge a link between this verse and Ali reject any Shia implications. For instance, the Sunni al-Razi (d. 606/1210) holds that wilaya in this verse is nothing more than friendship or mutual support. In response, Shia authors note that the particle innama (lit. 'only') confines the wilaya in this verse to God, Muhammad, and those believers who gave alms while praying. As such, wilaya in this verse has a different significance than mere friendship, similar to that in verse 33:6.

== In the hadith literature ==
=== Hadith of the warning ===
Verse 26:214 of the Quran tasked Muhammad with presenting Islam to his relatives, some three years after his first divine revelation (c. 617 CE). One of the two versions of how Muhammad attempted to do this is that he invited his relatives to a meal. After the meal, Muhammad introduced his relatives to Islam and asked for their support, "And which of you will assist me in this cause and become my brother, my trustee and my successor among you." Muhammad's cousin Ali, the youngest among them, was the only relative who offered his assistance to Muhammad, who then declared, "This [Ali] is my brother, my executor, and my successor among you, so listen to him and obey." This was the account of the Sunni al-Tabari (d. 923) and the proto-Shia Ibn Ishaq (d. 767), among others, though some Sunni reports do not include Muhammad's response to Ali or replace it with his rejection of Ali's offer. Muhammad's announcement was met with ridicule from Abu Lahab, Muhammad's uncle and his foe, and the guests dispersed.

==== Views ====
Rubin writes that Ali's response to Muhammad's call contrasts the remainder of his tribe, the Quraysh. He adds that the early appointment of Ali as Muhammad's heir in this version supports Ali's right to succeed Muhammad, a central tenet of Shia Islam. Momen is of the same opinion. According to the Shia exegete Tabatabai (d. 1981), Muhammad made it clear that the first relative to accept his invitation would become his successor and inheritor. Lastly, Rubin notes that the association of this account with verse 26:214 implies divine authorization. Burton comments that this banquet "won for [Muhammad] a proselyte worth a thousand sabers in the person of Ali, son of Abu Talib."

=== Hadith of the position ===
Hadith of position is a biblical analogy in favor of Ali that appears in canonical Sunni and Shia sources, including Sahih al-Bukhari and Kitab al-kafi. Muhammad might have repeated this analogy on multiple occasions, though the Hadith of Position is most frequently linked to the Expedition of Tabuk in 9-10/630-631 against the Byzantine Empire. Muhammad is said to have left Ali in charge at Medina before leaving on his longest expedition. But when rumors spread that Ali was left behind because he was a burden to Muhammad, he left Medina and caught up with Muhammad, who reassured him, "Are you not content, Ali, to stand to me as Aaron stood to Moses, except that there will be no prophet after me?"

==== Status of Aaron ====
By divine designation, Aaron was the associate of Moses in his prophetic mission and in revelation. In Hebrew Bible, Aaron also performs miracles and is entrusted with the esoteric knowledge of the scripture. Of similar importance therein is the divine prerogatives bestowed upon Aaron's descendants.

===== Shia views =====
Shia authors have used the Hadith of Position to argue for the special status of Ali and his designation as the successor of Muhammad. For instance, the Shia al-Mufid (d. 413/1022) writes that this hadith invested in Ali all the privileges which Aaron had received from Moses except prophethood. In particular, Ali was the deputy of Muhammad just as Aaron was the deputy of Moses, which implies that Ali was the rightful successor to Muhammad.

===== Sunni views =====
Despite its Shia coloring, the Hadith of Position nevertheless remains prominent in Sunni sources as one of the most important pieces of evidence supporting the finality of Muhammad in the chain of prophets. In response to the Shia claims, Sunni scholars argue that the Hadith of Position is irrelevant to Muhammad's succession because Aaron died before Moses. The Shia Sharif al-Murtaza (d. 436/1044) counters that had Aaron survived Moses, the former would have surely succeeded the latter. The Shia al-Kulayni (d. 329/941) adds that Moses' successor Joshua later designated the progeny of Aaron to succeed him instead of his own or Moses'. Al-Kulayni suggests that Joshua did so because it was the divine choice.

=== Ghadir Khumm ===
Shortly before his death in 632, Muhammad performed the Hajj rituals in Mecca. In his sermon in Mecca and again later at the Ghadir Khumm by some accounts, he alerted Muslims about his impending death. After the Hajj, Muhammad set off on the return journey from Mecca to Medina, accompanied by a large number of pilgrims. On the way, Muhammad called the Muslim caravan to a halt at the Ghadir Khumm before the pilgrims parted to go their separate ways.

After the noon prayer, Muhammad delivered a sermon in which he famously said, "He whose mawla I am, Ali is his mawla." Muhammad repeated this three or four more times, as reported in Musnad Ibn Hanbal, a canonical Sunni source. By some Shia and Sunni accounts, he then continued, "O God, befriend the friend of Ali and be the enemy of his enemy," which might have been the standard formula for pledging allegiance at the time, used later both by Ali and his son Hasan during their caliphates. As reported in Musnad Ibn Hanbal, Muhammad's companion Umar congratulated Ali after the sermon and told him, "You have now become mawla of every faithful man and woman."

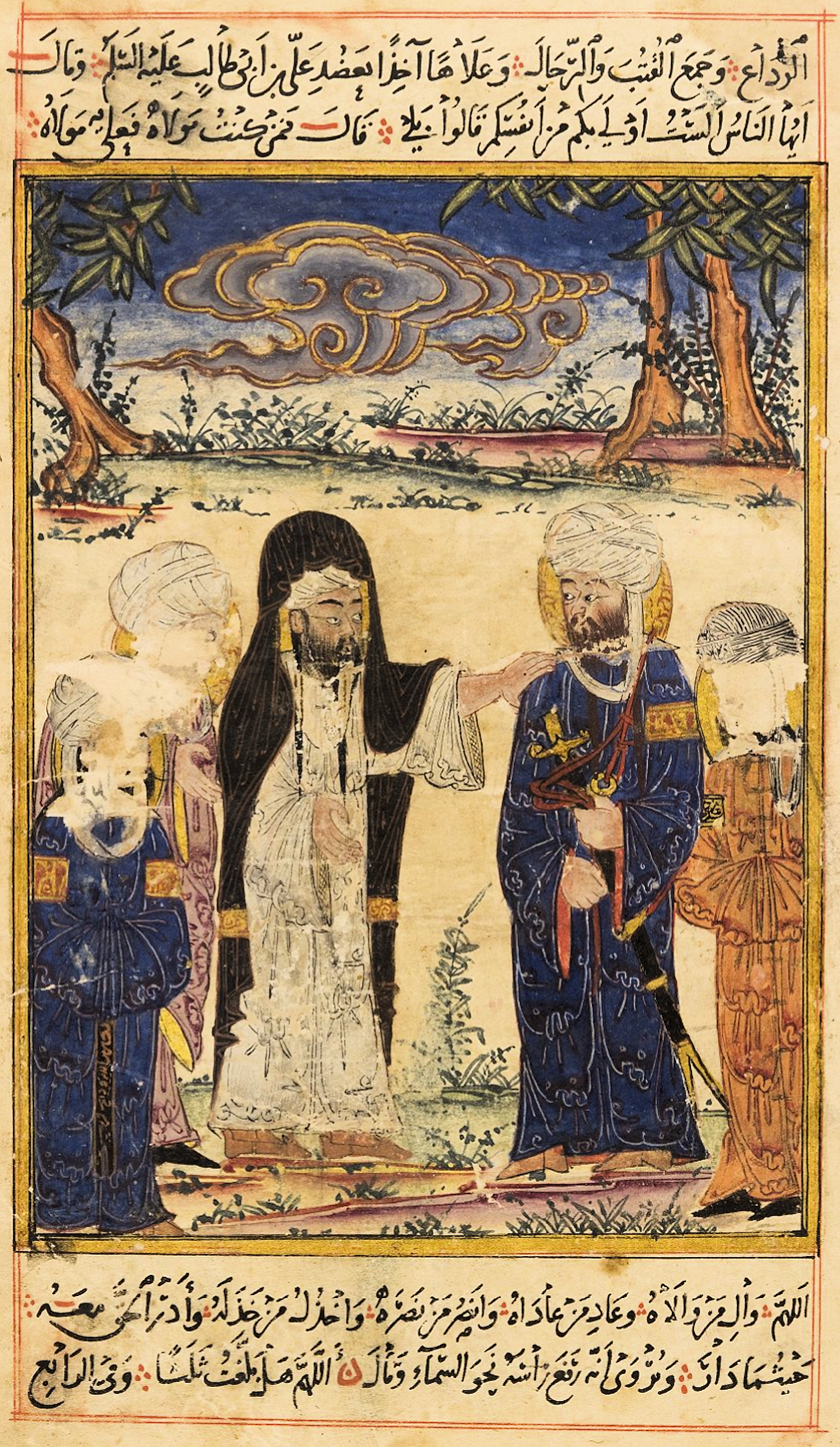
The Investiture of Ali at Ghadir Khumm, an illustration from Al-Biruni's Chronology of Ancient Nations

==== Historicity ====
The historicity of the Ghadir Khumm is rarely disputed within the Muslim community, as its recorded tradition is "among the most extensively acknowledged and substantiated" in classical Islamic sources, even as the statements made at the event remain open to interpretation. In Shia and some Sunni sources, two verses of the Quran are also associated with the Ghadir Khumm: the Verse of Ikmal (5:3), which announces the perfection of Islam, and the verse of Tabligh (5:67), which urges Muhammad to fulfill his divine instructions.

==== Mawla ====
In the context of the Ghadir Khumm, the polysemous Arabic word mawla is interpreted along sectarian lines. Shia sources interpret this word as meaning 'leader' or 'ruler', while Sunni accounts of this sermon tend to offer little explanation or substitute the word wali (of God, lit. 'friend of God') in place of mawla.

==== Shia views ====
Shia Muslims view the Ghadir Khumm as Muhammad's most public announcement of Ali's succession. Supporting the Shia interpretation, the Shia Amini has compiled multiple volumes of Sunni and Shia historical documents about the Ghadir Khumm.

==== Sunni views ====
Among Sunni Muslims, the Ghadir Khumm is not associated with the succession to Muhammad. Instead, the event is often connected with Ali's earlier campaign in Yemen, where he is said to have strictly imposed the Islamic guidelines for a fair distribution of booty. The Sunni Ibn Kathir (d. 774/1373) suggests that the Ghadir Khumm sermon was simply intended as a public declaration of Muhammad's love and esteem for Ali in response to criticism of some soldiers. Accepting this explanation as such, that Muhammad equated Ali with himself in an extraordinary announcement at the Ghadir Khumm still provides a strong basis for the Shia claims, suggests Jafri.

For the Sunni, it is also unimaginable that most companions would act wrongly and ignore a clear appointment of Ali at the Ghadir Khumm. The Shia response is that numerical strength cannot be a factor in a tribal community, adding that majority does not imply legitimacy in the Qur'an.

=== Congregational prayer ===
The most notable event that supports Abu Bakr's right to succession reportedly occurred towards the end of Muhammad's life. According to Walker, too ill to lead the prayers himself, Muhammad instructed Abu Bakr to take his place, ignoring concerns that he was too emotionally delicate for the role. In particular, when Muhammad entered the prayer hall one morning during the fajr prayer, Abu Bakr attempted to step back to let Muhammad lead the prayer but Muhammad allowed Abu Bakr to continue.

==== Authenticity ====
Jafri finds the related traditions often contradictory, many of which are attributed by Ibn Sa'd (d. 230/845) to Abu Bakr's daughter Aisha, whose rivalry and dislike for Ali and Fatima are well-documented. Mentioning three different versions of the story, Madelung defers to Caetani, who considers it fabricated. Shia authors similarly dispute the authenticity of these reports, adding that Muhammad had earlier instructed his companions, including Abu Bakr and Umar, to leave Medina on a military campaign against the Byzantines under Usama ibn Zayd.

==== Significance ====
Sunni authors often refer to this event as evidence of Abu Bakr's right to succeed Muhammad, though their accounts of the event might be colored by later Shia-Sunni polemics. Ayoub adds that the prayer argument was likely not a consideration in the early caliphal debate. Lecomte writes that Muhammad respected Abu Bakr but considers the prayer story inconclusive because it does not formally relate to the political leadership of the community. Walker notes that this and similar traditions suggest friendship and trust but are hardly related to succession because Muhammad regularly delegated this task and other positions of authority to others. For the same reason, Shaban goes further and assigns no significance to the prayer story.

=== Hadith of pen and paper ===
Shortly before his death, Muhammad asked for writing materials, so that he would "write something, after which you will not be led into error," as reported in the canonical Sunni collection Sahih al-Bukhari. Of those present at Muhammad's bedside, this report continues that his companion Umar protested, "The illness has overwhelmed the prophet. We have the book of God [Quran] and that is enough for us." In some reports by the Sunni Ibn Sa'd (d. 230/845), Umar instead says that Muhammad is raving. A quarrel then broke out at Muhammad's bedside, with some suggesting that his orders should be followed and some siding with Umar to disregard Muhammad's request. The argument is said to have saddened Muhammad, who asked them to leave and did not write anything. Some sources write that Muhammad instead gave oral recommendations, which have been recorded differently by various authors.

==== Views ====
The disobedience to Muhammad in this incident has been downplayed by some Sunni scholars, whereas others view this incident as a missed opportunity to formally designate Abu Bakr as the successor. Ibn Kathir (d. 774/1373) goes further, claiming that Muhammad had publicly appointed Abu Bakr before his final illness. In contrast, the incident is viewed as a calamity and a missed opportunity to designate Ali in Shia sources.

In relation to this episode, Madelung quotes an exchange between Ibn Abbas and Umar in which the latter claimed that Muhammad intended to name Ali as his successor and that he prevented this out of the conviction that Arabs would revolt against Ali. A tradition to this effect is also cited by the Shia Tabatabai (d. 1981). This view has been echoed by Hazleton.

== Views ==
=== Sunni ===
The general Sunni belief is that Muhammad had not chosen anyone to succeed him, instead reasoning that he had intended for the community to decide on a leader amongst themselves. However, some specific hadiths are used to justify that Muhammad intended Abu Bakr to succeed, but that he had shown this decision through his actions rather than doing so verbally.

In Sunni Islam, the election of a caliph is ideally a democratic choice made by the Muslim community. As this is difficult to enforce, Sunni Islam recognizes as caliph anyone who seizes power, as long as he is from the Quraysh, the tribe of Muhammad. Even the latter is not a strict requirement, given that Ottoman Caliphs had no familial relation to the Quraysh tribe. In Sunni Islam, caliphs are not viewed as infallible and can be removed from the office if their actions are deemed sinful. At the same time, obedience to a caliph is often regarded as a religious obligation even if the caliph is unjust. Conversely, a judge would be considered competent solely on the basis of his appointment by the government.

Historically, Abu Bakr, Umar, Uthman, and Ali are regarded by the Sunni as the most righteous of their generation, with their merit being reflected in their caliphate. The subsequent caliphates of the Umayyads and the Abbasids, while not ideal, are seen as legitimate because they complied with the requirements of the law, kept the borders safe and the community united. While the Umayyads and the Abbasids are viewed as kingships, the Sunni was more willing than others to accommodate these rulers, regardless of their legitimacy and mode of government, and in so doing the Sunni made most of Islamic history their own.

=== Shia ===
==== Twelver ====
Twelver Shi’ism is the largest branch of the Shia Islam, representing about 85% of the Shia population. In the Twelver Shia view, after a prophet's death, it is deemed as essential that a divinely-appointed successor would guide the faithful towards the righteous path. Without a divinely-appointed successor, according to the Twelver Shia, the prophetic mission and God's favor to the faithful would both remain incomplete. At the same time, in Shia theology, this designated successor would not rule by force if the faithful withhold their support.

The Twelver Shia view is that, similar to the past prophets in the Quran, the succession to Muhammad was settled by divine appointment, rather than by consensus. Moreover, as with the past prophets in the Quran, God chose Muhammad's successor from his family. A number of verses in the Quran and some hadiths might be linked to the prominent position of Muhammad's family in Islam, including the verse of purification, verse of mubahala, and verse of mawadda in the Quran, and the well-attested Hadith of the Thaqalayn and the Hadith of the Ark.

===== Appointment of Ali =====
The view advanced by the Shia is that Muhammad announced his cousin and son-in-law, Ali, as his rightful successor shortly before his death at the Event of Ghadir Khumm and also earlier in his prophetic mission at the Event of Dhul Asheera. After the announcement at Ghadir Khumm, there is evidence that the Verse of Ikmal was revealed to Muhammad, declaring the completion of God's favor to the faithful. Though it is believed that Ali considered himself as the rightful successor of Muhammad, he is said to have turned down proposals to forcefully pursue his claims to the caliphate after the appointment of Abu Bakr, for the sake of preserving the unity of Islam in a critical time.

===== Ali's merits =====
Ali's distinctions are amply attested to in Islamic sources. In Mecca, a young Ali is said to have been the first male to embrace Islam and the only person who offered his support when Muhammad first introduced Islam to his relatives. Later, he facilitated Muhammad's safe escape to Medina by risking his life as the decoy. In Medina, Ali sworn a pact a brotherhood with Muhammad and later took the hand of Muhammad's daughter, Fatimah, in marriage. Ali commonly acted as Muhammad's secretary in Medina and served as his deputy during the Expedition of Tabuk. Saluted as Asadullah (literally, "the lion of God"), Ali has been viewed as the most able warrior in Muhammad's army and the two were the only Muslim men who represented Islam against a Christian delegation from Najran. Ali's role in the collection of the Quran, the central text of Islam, is deemed as one of his key contributions. When, following the revelation of the surah at-Tawbah, Abu Bakr was sent to Mecca to give an ultimatum to disbelievers, there is strong evidence that Muhammad might have sent out Ali to take over this responsibility.

===== Ali's role =====
In Shia theology, while direct revelation ended with Muhammad's death, Ali remained the righteous guide towards God, similar to the successors of the past prophets in the Quran. After Muhammad's death, Ali inherited his divine knowledge and his authority to correctly interpret the Quran, especially its allegorical and metaphorical verses (mutashabihat). Often cited here is a well-attested hadith, attributed to Muhammad, which reads as, "I am the city of knowledge and Ali is its gate."

===== Ali's infallibility =====
In Shia Islam, where he is regarded as the righteous guide after Muhammad, Ali is believed to be infallible. Ali is one of the Ahl al-Kisa, who are addressed by the sahih Hadith of Kisa and the related verse of purification in the Quran, which includes the passage, "Indeed God desires to repel all impurity from you, O Ahl al-Bayt, and purify you with a thorough purification."

===== Imamate =====
According to the Shia, Ali succeeded Muhammad as the first Imam after Muhammad, that is, the righteous guide towards God and His vicar on the earth. This divine authority, known as imamate, is central to the Shia belief and appears in multiple verses of the Quran. In particular, verse 21:73 reads as

We made them Imams, guiding by Our command, and We revealed to them the performance of good deeds, the maintenance of prayers, and the giving of zakat, and they used to worship Us.

In the Twelver Shia belief, since the time of the first prophet, Adam, the earth has never remained without an Imam, in the form of prophets and their divinely-appointed successors. After Ali, imamate was passed down to his son, Hasan, through divinely-inspired designation (nass). In Shia theology, at any time, there is only one Imam and his successor, if alive, is called the silent Imam. After Hasan's death, his brother, Husayn, and nine of his descendants are regarded as Imams, the last of whom, Mahdi, went into occultation in 260 AH (874 CE), compelled by the hostility of his enemies. His advent is awaited by all Muslims, though different sects hold different views about Mahdi. In his absence, the vacuum in the Shia leadership is partly filled by marjaiyya and, more recently, wilayat al-faqqih, i.e., guardianship of the Islamic jurist.

==== Zaydi ====
According to Jafri, it is widely reported that the fourth Shia Imam, Zayn al-Abidin, designated his son, Muhammad al-Baqir, as the next Imam before his death. Zayd, a half-brother of Muhammad al-Baqir, also asserted a claim to imamate on the basis that the title can belong to any descendant of Hasan or Husayn who is learned, pious, and revolts against the tyrants of his time. On this basis, his followers, known as Zaydis, consider Zayd as the rightful successor of the fourth Shia Imam, though the fourth Imam himself did not revolt against the Umayyads and instead adopted a policy of quiescence.

Initially, Zayd's activist approach gained him a large following. However, as he increasingly compromised with the traditionalists, some of Zayd's supporters are said to have returned to Muhammad al-Baqir. According to Jafri, a related incident is when two Kufan Shias asked Zayd if the first Shia Imam, Ali, was an Imam before he resorted to the sword. When Zayd refused to answer this question, the two broke their allegiance with him and went back to Muhammad al-Baqir. Eventually, Zayd took up arms against the Umayyads in 122 AH and was killed in Kufa by the forces of Caliph Hisham.

One faction of the Zaidiyyah, called the Batriyya, attempted a compromise between Sunni and Shia by accepting the legitimacy of the Sunni caliphs while maintaining that they were inferior to Ali. Imamat al-Mafdul (literally, "imamate of the inferior") is the belief that, while Ali was better suited to succeed Muhammad, the reigns of Abu Bakr and Umar must be acknowledged since Ali did not revolt against them.

=== Ibadi ===
The Ibadi, an Islamic school distinct from Sunni and Shia, believe that leadership of the Muslim community is not something which should be decided by lineage, tribal affiliations or divine selection, but rather through election by leading Muslims. They do not view their leaders as infallible. In particular, if a leader fails to maintain a legitimate government in accordance with the Islamic law, it is the duty of the population to remove him from power. The Rashidun Caliphs are seen as rulers who were elected in a legitimate fashion and, in particular, Abu Bakr and Umar are viewed as righteous leaders. However, Uthman is viewed as having committed grave sins during the latter half of his rule and was deserving of death. Ali is also similarly understood to have lost his mandate.

The Ibadi have been labeled by some scholars as the "moderate Kharijites". Their first Imam was Abd Allah ibn Wahb al-Rasibi, who led the Kharijites after their withdrawal from Ali's camp. Other Imams include Abu Ubaidah Muslim, Abdallah ibn Yahya al-Kindi, and Umar ibn Abdul Aziz.

== Sources ==
Books

- Corrigan, John; Denny, Frederick; Jaffee, Martin S.; Eire, Carlos (8 January 2016). Jews, Christians, Muslims: A Comparative Introduction to Monotheistic Religions. Routledge. ISBN 978-1-317-34699-9.
- Durant, Will (1950). The Story of Civilization: The Age of Faith. New York: Simon and Schuster. p. 191.
- Kelen, Betty (1975). Muhammad: The messenger of God. T. Nelson. ISBN 9780929093123.
- de-Gaia, Susan (2018). Encyclopedia of women in world religions. ABC-CLIO. ISBN 9781440848506.
- Meri, Joseph W. (2006). Medieval Islamic civilization : an encyclopedia. New York: Routledge. ISBN 978-0-415-96690-0.
- Aslan, Reza (2011). No god But God: The Origins, Evolution, and Future of Islam. Random House. ISBN 9780812982442.
- Fitzpatrick, Coeli; Walker, Adam Hani (25 April 2014). Muhammad in History, Thought, and Culture: An Encyclopedia of the Prophet of God [2 volumes]. ABC-CLIO. ISBN 978-1-61069-178-9 – via Google Books.
- Rogerson, Barnaby (4 November 2010). The Heirs of the Prophet Muhammad: And the Roots of the Sunni-Shia Schism. Little, Brown Book Group. ISBN 978-0-7481-2470-1.
- Hazleton, Lesley (2009). After the prophet: The epic story of the Shia-Sunni split in Islam. Knopf Doubleday Publishing Group. ISBN 9780385532099.
- Zwettler, Michael (1990). "A Mantic Manifesto: The Sura of "The Poets" and the Qur'anic Foundations of Prophetic Authority". Poetry and Prophecy: The Beginnings of a Literary Tradition. Cornell University Press. ISBN 0-8014-9568-7.
- Jafri, S.H.M (1979). Origins and Early Development of Shia Islam. London: Longman.
- Momen, Moojan (1985). An Introduction to Shi'i Islam. Yale University Press. ISBN 9780853982005.
- Madelung, Wilferd (1997). The Succession to Muhammad: A Study of the Early Caliphate. Cambridge University Press. ISBN 978-0-521-64696-3.
- Abbas, Hassan (2021). The Prophet's Heir: the Life of Ali ibn Abi Talib. Yale University Press. ISBN 9780300252057.
- Hazleton, Lesley (2013). The First Muslim: the Story of Muhammad. Atlantic Books Ltd. ISBN 9781782392316.
- Irving, Washington (1868). Mahomet and His Successors. Vol. 8. New York: G. P. Putnam and Son.
- Sodiq, Yushau (2010). An Insider's Guide to Islam. Trafford Publishing. ISBN 978-1-4269-2560-3.
- Rogerson, Barnaby (2006). The Heirs of the Prophet Muhammad: and the Roots of the Sunni-Shia Schism. Overlook Press.
- Mavani, Hamid (2013). Religious Authority and Political Thought in Twelver Shi'ism: From Ali to Post-Khomeini. Routledge. ISBN 9780415624404.
- Shaban, M. A. (1976). Islamic History: A New Interpretation. Vol. I. Cambridge University Press. ISBN 978-0-521-29131-6.
- Shah-Kazemi, Reza (2014). "Ali ibn Abi Talib (599-661)". In Fitzpatrick, Coeli; Walker, Adam Hani (eds.). Muhammad in History, Thought, and Culture: An Encyclopaedia of the Prophet of God. ABC-CLIO. p. 20. ISBN 9781610691772.
- Brunner, Rainer (2014). "Ahl al-Bayt". In Fitzpatrick, Coeli; Walker, Adam Hani (eds.). Muhammad in History, Thought, and Culture: An Encyclopaedia of the Prophet of God. ABC-CLIO. p. 5. ISBN 9781610691772.
- Daftary, Farhad; Nanji, Azim (2014). "Shi'ism". In Fitzpatrick, Coeli; Walker, Adam Hani (eds.). Muhammad in History, Thought, and Culture: An Encyclopaedia of the Prophet of God. ABC-CLIO. p. 559. ISBN 9781610691772.
- Walker, Adam Hani (2014). "Abu Bakr Siddiq (C. 573-634)". In Fitzpatrick, Coeli; Walker, Adam Hani (eds.). Muhammad in History, Thought, and Culture: An Encyclopaedia of the Prophet of God. ABC-CLIO. p. 1. ISBN 9781610691772.
- Miskinzoda, Gurdofarid (2014). "The Story of Pen and Paper and its interpretation in Muslim Literary and Historical Tradition". In Farhad Daftary (ed.). The Study of Shiʿi Islam: History, Theology and Law. The Study of Shi‘i Islam: History, Theology and Law. I.B.Tauris. ISBN 978-0-85773-529-4.
- Gross, Max (2012). "Shi'a Muslims and Security: the Centrality of Iran". In Seiple, Chris; Hoover, Dennis; Otis, Pauletta (eds.). The Routledge handbook of religion and security. Routledge. p. 58. ISBN 9781136239328.
- Cooperson, Michael (2000). Classical Arabic Biography: the Heirs of the Prophets in the Age of al-Ma'mun. Cambridge University Press. p. 25. ISBN 978-1-139-42669-5.
- Badie, Dina (2017). After Saddam: American Foreign Policy and the Destruction of Secularism in the Middle East. Lexington Books. p. 3. ISBN 978-1-4985-3900-5.
- Searcy, Kim (2011). The Formation of the Sudanese Mahdist State: Ceremony and Symbols of Authority: 1882-1898. Brill. p. 46. ISBN 978-90-04-18599-9.
- Donner, Fred M. (2010). Muhammad and the Believers: at the Origins of Islam. Harvard University Press. ISBN 9780674064140.
- Hoffman, Valerie J. (2012). The Essentials of Ibadi Islam. Syracuse University Press. ISBN 978-0-8156-5084-3.
- Lewis, Bernard (2002). Arabs in History. Oxford: Oxford University Press. ISBN 978-0-19-164716-1.
- Wellhausen, Julius (1927). The Arab Kingdom and Its Fall. Translated by Margaret Graham Weir. Calcutta: University of Calcutta.
- Middleton, John (2015). World Monarchies and Dynasties. Routledge. ISBN 978-1-317-45158-7.
- Betty, Kelen (1975). Muhammad: the Messenger of God. Nashville: T. Nelson. ISBN 9780929093123.
- Peters, Francis (1994). Muhammad and the Origins of Islam. Albany: State University of New York Press. ISBN 9780791418758.
- Vernyuy Wirba, Asan (2017). Leadership From an Islamic and Western Perspective. Chartridge Books Oxford. ISBN 9781911033288.
- Ali, Abdul (1996). Islamic Dynasties of the Arab East: State and Civilization during the Later Medieval Times. M.D. Publications Pvt. Ltd. ISBN 978-81-7533-008-5.
- Jenkins, Everett (2010). The Muslim Diaspora (Volume 1, 570-1500): A Comprehensive Chronology of the Spread of Islam in Asia, Africa, Europe and the Americas. Vol. 1. McFarland. ISBN 978-0-7864-4713-8.
- Khadduri, Majid; Liebesny, Herbert J. (2008). Origin and Development of Islamic Law. The Lawbook Exchange, Ltd. ISBN 978-1-58477-864-6.
- Hay, Jeff (2007). The Greenhaven Encyclopedia of World Religions. Greenhaven Publishing LLC. ISBN 978-0-7377-4627-3.
- Vansina, Jan (1985). Oral Tradition as History. James Currey Publishers. ISBN 978-0852550076.
- Reeves, Minou (2003). Muhammad in Europe: a Thousand Years of Western Myth-Making. NYU Press. ISBN 978-0-8147-7564-6.
- Robinson, Chase F. (2003). Islamic Historiography. Cambridge University Press. ISBN 0-521-62936-5.
- Donner, Fred McGraw (1998). Narratives of Islamic origins: the beginnings of Islamic historical writing. Darwin Press. ISBN 978-0-87850-127-4.
- Nigosian, Solomon Alexander (2004). Islam: Its History, Teaching, and Practices. Indiana University Press. ISBN 978-0-253-21627-4.
- Watt, William Montgomery (1953). Muhammad at Mecca. Clarendon Press. ISBN 978-0-19-577277-7.
- Caetani, Leone (1907). Annali dell'Islam. Vol. II, Part I. Milan: Ulrico Hoepli.
- Sachedina, Abdulaziz Abdulhussein (1981). Islamic Messianism: The Idea of Mahdi in Twelver Shi'is. Albany: State University of New York Press. ISBN 0-87395-458-0.
- Landolt, Hermann; Lawson, Todd (2005). Reason and Inspiration in Islam: Theology, Philosophy and Mysticism in Muslim Thought: Essays in Honour of Hermann Landolt. London; New York: I.B. Tauris. ISBN 978-1-85043-470-2.
- Modarressi, Hossein (2003). Tradition and Survival: A Bibliographical Survey of Early Shi'ite Literature. Oneworld. ISBN 978-1-85168-331-4.
- Dakake, Maria Massi (2007). The Charismatic Community: Shiʻite Identity in Early Islam. State University of New York Press. ISBN 978-0-7914-7033-6.
- Lalani, Arzina R. (2000). Early Shi'i Thought: The Teachings of Imam Muhammad al-Baqir. I. B. Tauris. ISBN 978-1860644344.
- Nasr, S.H.; Dagli, C.K.; Dakake, M.M.; Lumbard, J.E.B.; Rustom, M., eds. (2015). The Study Quran: A New Translation and Commentary. Harper Collins. ISBN 9780062227621.
- Tabatabai, Sayyid Mohammad Hosayn (1975). Shi'ite Islam. Translated by Sayyid Hossein Nasr. State University of New York Press. ISBN 0-87395-390-8.
- Rubin, Uri (1995). The Eye of the Beholder: The life of Muhammad as viewed by the early Muslims. Princeton, New Jersey: The Darwin Press Inc. ISBN 9780878501106.
- Burton, Richard Francis (1898). The Jew, the Gypsy and El Islam. Herbert S. Stone & Company. p. 335. ISBN 978-0-526-07524-9.
- Donaldson, Dwight M. (1933). The Shi'ite Religion: A History of Islam in Persia and Iraḳ. AMS Press.
- Sanders, Paula (1994). Ritual, Politics, and the City in Fatimid Cairo. State University of New York Press. ISBN 9781438418629.
- Keaney, Heather N. (2021). 'Uthman ibn 'Affan: Legend or Liability?. Oneworld Publications. ISBN 9781786076984.
- McHugo, John (2018). A Concise History of Sunnis and Shi'is. Georgetown University Press. ISBN 9781626165885.
- Ayoub, Mahmoud M. (2014). The Crisis of Muslim History: Religion and Politics in Early Islam. Oneworld Publications. ISBN 9781780746746.

Journal

- Khetia, Vinay (2013). Fatima as a motif of contention and suffering in Islamic sources (Thesis). Concordia University.
- Elamir, Norah (2016). The theological concept of ʿisma from the early to modern period of Islam (PDF) (Thesis). The University of Texas at Austin.
- Newman, Andrew J. (1999). "The Succession to Muhammad: A Study of the Early Caliphate by Wilferd Madelung". Iranian Studies. 32. 32 (3). International Society for Iranian Studies: 403–5. doi:10.1017/S0021086200002747. JSTOR 4311271. S2CID 245661987.
- Miskinzoda, Gurdofarid (2015). "The significance of the Hadith of the Position of Aaron for the formulation of the Shi'i doctrine of authority". Bulletin of the School of Oriental and African Studies. 78 (1). doi:10.1017/S0041977X14001402. S2CID 159678004.
- Lewinstein, Keith (2001). "The Succession to Muhammad: A Study of the Early Caliphate by Wilferd Madelung". Journal of the American Oriental Society. 121. 121 (2). American Oriental Society: 326–27. doi:10.2307/606600. JSTOR 606600.
- Cortese, Delia; Calderini, Simonetta (2006). Women and the Fatimids in the World of Islam (First ed.). Edinburgh University Press. ISBN 978-0748617333.
- Soufi, Denise Louise (1997). The Image of Fatima in Classical Muslim Thought (PhD thesis). Princeton University. ProQuest 304390529.
- Rubin, Uri (1979). "Prophets and Progenitors in the Early Shīʿa Tradition". Jerusalem Studies in Arabic and Islam. 1: 41–65.
- Lalani, Arzina (2011). "Ghadir Khumm". Oxford Bibliographies.

Encyclopedia

- Nasr, Seyyed Hossein; Afsaruddin, Asma (2021). "ʿAlī". Encyclopedia Britannica.
- Nasr, Seyyed Hossein; Afsaruddin, Asma (2022). "Ali". Encyclopedia Britannica.
- Gleave, Robert M. (2022). "Ali b. Abi Talib". Encyclopaedia of Islam (Third ed.). Brill Reference Online.
- Cragg, Albert Kenneth (2008). "Hadith". Encyclopædia Britannica Online. Encyclopædia Britannica, Inc. Archived from the original on 2008-04-16.
- McAuliffe, Jane Dammen, ed. (2002). Encyclopaedia of the Qurʾān. Vol. 2. Brill Academic Publishers.
- Poonawala, Ismail (2011). "ʿAlī b. Abī Ṭāleb". Encyclopædia Iranica. Archived from the original on April 29, 2011.
- Glassé, Cyril, ed. (2003). The New Encyclopedia of Islam. Revised Edition of the Concise Encyclopedia of Islam. AltaMira Press. ISBN 978-0-7591-0190-6.
- Madelung, Wilferd (1986). "S̲h̲īʿa". Encyclopaedia of Islam, Second Edition. E. J. Brill.
- Veccia Vaglieri, Laura (1960). "ʿAlī b. Abī Ṭālib". In Gibb, H. A. R.; Kramers, J. H.; Lévi-Provençal, E.; Schacht, J.; Lewis, B. & Pellat, Ch. (eds.). The Encyclopaedia of Islam, Second Edition. Volume I: A–B. Leiden: E. J. Brill. pp. 381–386. OCLC 495469456.
- Veccia Vaglieri, L. (2022). "Ghadir Khumm". Encyclopaedia of Islam (Second ed.). Brill Reference Online.
- Veccia Vaglieri, L. (2022b). "Fatima". Encyclopaedia of Islam (Second ed.). Brill Reference Online.
- Amir-Moezzi, Mohammad Ali (2022). "Ghadir Khumm". Encyclopaedia of Islam (Third ed.). Brill Reference Online.
- Campo, Juan Eduardo, ed. (2009). "Ghadir Khumm". Encyclopedia of Islam. Infobase Publishing. p. 257. ISBN 9781438126968.
- Kohlberg, Etan (2013). "Jafar al-Sadiq (702-65)". In Bowering, Gerhard (ed.). The Princeton Encyclopedia of Islamic Political Thought. Princeton University Press. p. 268. ISBN 9780691134840.
- Yücesoy, Hayrettin (2013). "Imamate". In Bowering, Gerhard (ed.). The Princeton Encyclopedia of Islamic Political Thought. Princeton University Press. p. 247. ISBN 9780691134840.
- Syed, Mairaj (2013). "Sunnism". In Bowering, Gerhard (ed.). The Princeton Encyclopedia of Islamic Political Thought. Princeton University Press. p. 535. ISBN 9780691134840.
- Lecomte, G. (2022). "Al-Saḳifa". Encyclopaedia of Islam (Second ed.). Brill Reference Online.
- Glassé, Cyril (2001). "Shiah". The New Encyclopedia of Islam. AltaMira Press. p. 422. ISBN 9780759101890.
- Glassé, Cyril (2001b). "Ali ibn Abi Talib". The new encyclopedia of Islam. AltaMira Press. p. 39. ISBN 9780759101890.
- Gleave, Robert M. (2021). "Ali b. Abi Talib". Encyclopaedia of Islam (Third ed.). Brill Reference Online.
- Hawting, G.R. (2022). "Yazid (I) b. Muwiya". Encyclopaedia of Islam (Second ed.). Brill Reference Online.
- Haider, Najam I. (2022). "Al-Husayn b. Ali b. Abi Talib". Encyclopaedia of Islam (Second ed.). Brill Reference Online.
- Buehler, Arthur F. (2014). "FATIMA (d. 632)". In Fitzpatrick, Coeli; Walker, Adam Hani (eds.). Muhammad in History, Thought, and Culture: An Encyclopaedia of the Prophet of God. Vol. 1. ABC-CLIO. pp. 182–7. ISBN 9781610691772.
- Fedele, Valentina (2018). "FATIMA (605/15-632 CE)". In de-Gaia, Susan (ed.). Encyclopedia of Women in World Religions. ABC-CLIO. p. 56. ISBN 9781440848506.
- Qutbuddin, Tahera (2006). "FATIMA (AL-ZAHRA') BINT MUHAMMAD (CA. 12 BEFORE HIJRA-1 1/CA. 610-632)". In Meri, Josef W. (ed.). Medieval Islamic Civilization: An Encyclopedia. Routledge. pp. 248–50. ISBN 978-0415966900.
- Lalani, Arzina R. (2006). "'ALI IBN ABI TALIB". In Leaman, Oliver (ed.). The Qur'an: an Encyclopedia. Routledge. pp. 28–32. ISBN 9-78-0-415-32639-1.
- Leaman, O. (2006). "AHL AL-BAYT". In Leaman, O. (ed.). The Qur'an: An Encyclopedia. Taylor & Francis. pp. 16, 17.
- Goldziher, I.; Arendonk, C. van; Tritton, A.S. (2022). "Ahl Al-Bayt". In Bearman, P. (ed.). Encyclopaedia of Islam (Second ed.). Brill Reference Online.
- Stewart, Devin J. (2002). McAuliffe, Jane Dammen (ed.). Encyclopaedia of the Quran. Vol. 2. Brill. ISBN 90-04-14743-8.
- Wensinck, A.J.; Crone, P. (2022). "Mawlā". Encyclopaedia of Islam (Second ed.). Brill Reference Online.
- Anthony, Sean W. (2013). "'Ali b. Abi Talib (ca. 599-661)". In Bowering, Gerhard (ed.). The Princeton encyclopedia of Islamic political thought. Princeton University Press. pp. 30–2. ISBN 9780691134840.
