= Sulaym ibn Qays =

Purported author of a Shi'i hadith collection (died before 714)

Sulaym ibn Qays al-Hilālī al-ʿĀmirī

Personal life
- Born: Unknown Kufa, Iraq
- Died: Before 714 Now Bandegan, Iran
- Era: Early Islamic period
- Notable work: Kitab Sulaym ibn Qays (The Book of Sulaym ibn Qays)

Religious life
- Religion: Islam

Sulaym ibn Qays al-Hilālī al-ʿĀmirī (Arabic: سليم بن قيس الهلالي العامري, died before 714) was one of the Tabi‘un and a companion of Ali towards the end of the latter's life. Sulaym was also a loyal companion of the Shia Imams Hasan ibn Ali, Husayn ibn Ali, Ali Zayn al-Abidin, and Muhammad al-Baqir.

He is the purported author of an early Shi'ite hadith collection, the Kitab Sulaym ibn Qays ('The Book of Sulaym ibn Qays'), the attribution of which to Sulaym is generally considered false. Scholars also dispute whether he ever existed as a historical figure.

== Biography ==
=== Historicity ===
Much of the information about Sulaym comes from Shia Muslim tradition. According to the modern historian Moktar Djebli, "the very existence of this man, and of his work, should be regarded with caution". Hossein Modarressi calls it "obvious that such a person never existed and that the name is only a pen name". Other scholars, such as Mohammad Ali Amir-Moezzi, have been more cautious in rejecting Sulaym ibn Qays' historicity, but do agree that the attribution of the extant Shi'i hadith collection to him is false.

Ibn al-Nadim himself, as well as later biographers including al-Tusi, relied on the Alid writer Ali ibn Ahmad al-Aqiq (d. 911). The Mu'tazili scholar Ibn Abi'l-Hadid questioned Sulaym's existence, claiming "he had heard" certain Twelver Shi'a scholars assert that Sulaym was "pure invention of the imagination" and "his alleged book being nothing but the apocryphal work of a forger".

The Twelver scholars Ahmad ibn Ubayda (d. 941) and Abu Abd Allah al-Ghadhanfari (d. 1020) based their denial of the existence of Sulaym's book on three factors: a segment in the book indicates there were thirteen imams instead of the traditionally held twelve; another segment states Muhammad ibn Abu Bakr condemned his dying father Abu Bakr despite Muhammad being a three-year-old child; and the book was allegedly solely transmitted to Aban ibn Abi Ayyash, despite the fact that the latter was only fourteen-years-old. However, the prominent Twelver scholar al-Hilli rejected theories about Sulaym's non-existence, though Djebli asserts al-Hilli's "arguments were too unconvincing to sweep away such doubts". Nonetheless, later Shi'a biographers produced al-Hilli's arguments verbatim, and Sulaym's book is considered by Shi'a scholars as among the oldest sources of Shi'a thought and equal to the four major works of Sunni tradition, namely the Ṣaḥīḥ al-Bukhārī, Ṣaḥīḥ Muslim, Musnad Ibn Ḥanbal and Muwaṭṭaʾ Imām Mālik.

=== Traditional account ===
==== Early life ====
Sulaym ibn Qays was born near the place where Kufa was later built. The exact date of Sulaym's birth is not known. He belonged to the Banu Hilal branch of the Banu 'Amir tribe.

==== Immigration to Medina ====
It is documented that Sulaym moved to Medina during the caliphate of Umar. He is among the people who never met Muhammad. While in Medina, Sulaym became very attached to Ali ibn Abi Talib. His attachment led him to become a partisan of Ali, along with Abu Dhar al-Ghifari, Salman al-Muhammadi, Miqdad ibn Aswad, and Ammar ibn Yasir. Ibn al-Nadim stated that Sulaym ibn Qays was among the devout companions of Ali in his book about the early Muslim scholars and hadith contributors.

==== Final days ====
In 694, Sulaym fled to Persia with his writings because al-Hajjaj ibn Yusuf, the Umayyad general and persecutor of the Alids, became the governor of Kufa; Al-Hajjaj sought to arrest and execute Sulaym. In Persia, Sulaym stayed in Nobandegan. There he found a fifteen-year-old boy by the name of Aban ibn Abi-Ayyash. He became rather fond of him and started to educate him about the teaching of the Ahl al-Bayt. Through Sulaym, Aban became a Shi'a. Aban offered him shelter in recognition of him being a companion of Ali. When Sulaym was inspired about his death, he told Aban,

O the son of my brother, I am about to leave this world, as Prophet has informed me so.

Eventually, Sulaym entrusted all of his writings that he had compiled to Aban. Aban had made a solemn oath not to talk of any of the writings during Sulaym's lifetime and that after his death he would give the book only to trustworthy Shi'a of Ali. He died before al-Hajjaj ibn Yusuf, who died in 714 CE (95 AH).

== Writings ==
A book was falsely attributed to him, which became known as the Kitab Sulaym ibn Qays (The Book of Sulaym ibn Qays). It is a collection of traditions, teachings, and eye witness accounts of historical events. Kitab Sulaym belongs to earliest known hadith collections, having been composed in the second century after the death of Muhammad.

The precise dating of this work is not clear. The modern scholar Hossein Modarressi dates the original core of this work to the final years of Hisham ibn Abd al-Malik's reign (r. 724–743), which would make it one of the oldest Islamic books that are still extant. However, the fact that it contains so many later additions and alterations may render it impossible to reconstruct the original text. Two individual passages which have been the subject of a case study have been dated to c. 762–780 and to the late 8th or early 9th century, respectively.

This book documents prophetic traditions concerning Imam Muhammad al-Mahdi. It documents that Muhammad had promised his followers about a man from the lineage of Imam Husain who would purify Islam by removing innovations, i.e. the distortion of Quranic interpretation and prophetic traditions (hadiths). The work is also one of the first to document the political divide amongst Muslims after the death of Muhammad, and how certain figures in Islam allegedly distorted prophetic traditions in order to gain power. One of the events recorded in the book is the event of Saqifah in which Abu Bakr is said to have forcefully striped the rightful leadership of Imam Ali. For instance, the book claims that Salman al-Muhammadi, Miqdad ibn Aswad, Ammar ibn Yasir, Abdullah ibn Ja'far, Abu al-Haytham ibn Tayhan, Khuzaymah ibn Thabit, and Abu Ayyub stated that Muhammad at Ghadir Khumm said,

"O people, the legal power (al-Wilaya) is granted only to Ali ibn Abi Talib and the trustees from my progeny, the decedents of my brother Ali. He will be the first, and his two sons, al-Hasan and al-Husayn, will succeed him consecutively. They will not separate themselves from the Qur'an until they return to Allah." Most of the book is directly attributed to Muhammad himself.

According to Modarressi, following in this the famous Shi'a Quran exegete Ahmad ibn Ali al-Najashi (born 372 after Hijri/982 CE), the alleged indication in Sulaym ibn Qays' book that there were thirteen Imams instead of the traditionally held twelve, is a later addition by an unknown fourth-century AH scholar who wanted to please his Zaydi patron, and who added Zayd ibn Ali to the list as an Imam. According to Modarressi, it was not a part of the original book and was removed in successive editions.

== Bibliography ==
- Djebli, Moktar (1960–2007). "Sulaym b. Ḳays". In Bearman, P.; Bianquis, Th.; Bosworth, C.E.; van Donzel, E.; Heinrichs, W.P. (eds.). Encyclopaedia of Islam, Second Edition. doi:10.1163/1573-3912_islam_SIM_7152.
- Gleave, Robert M. (2015). "Early Shiite hermeneutics and the dating of Kitāb Sulaym ibn Qays". Bulletin of the School of Oriental and African Studies. 78 (1): 83–103. doi:10.1017/S0041977X15000038. S2CID 170561609.
- Modarressi, Hossein (2003). Tradition and Survival: A Bibliographical Survey of Early Shīʿite Literature. Oxford: Oneworld. ISBN 1-85168-331-3.
