= Aban ibn Abi Ayyash =

Persian author

Aban ibn Abi Ayyash (آبَان ٱبْن أَبِي عَيَّاش, ʾĀbān ibn ʾAbī ʿAyyāsh) was a Persian author, who is believed to be a companion of Sulaym ibn Qays and several Shia Imams. He is said to have compiled the Book of Sulaym ibn Qays. Aban ibn Abi Ayyash famously narrated about the Attack on Fatima's house, which some of the Shia consider authentic while Sunnis consider it unauthentic. In hadith studies, he is considered unreliable by both Shia and Sunni rijal scholars.

Aban ibn Abi Ayyash is known for his narration of Kitab Sulaym bin Qays, which is a significant early Shia text. The book is attributed to Sulaym bin Qays al-Hilali, who was a companion of Ali ibn Abi Talib, the cousin of the prophet Muhammad and first Shia Imam, and contains traditions (hadiths) that are important to the Shia community, especially regarding theological and historical matters related to the early Islamic period and the leadership of Ali. However, the core text of the book has been dated much later by scholars, to the reign of Hisham ibn Abd al-Malik's reign (r. 723–743), which still makes it one of the earliest Islamic books compiled.

Aban ibn Abi Ayyash's narration of this book highlights his role as a transmitter of early Islamic knowledge and traditions, particularly within the Shia tradition where the book holds considerable theological and historical significance.

== Non-reliability in Hadith ==
=== Shia view ===
The Shia rijal scholars themselves do not consider Aban as a reliable Hadith transmitter. Even after some recent Shi'ite rijal scholars including Mirza Husayn Nuri and Abd Allah Mamaqani tried to prove that Ibn Abi Ayyash was reliable, he is not accepted as a reliable source. On the matter of authenticity of Kitab Sulaym Ibn Qis which was solely transmitted by Aban, Al-Shaykh Al-Mufid (d. 1022) noted: "This book (Kitab Sulaym) is not reliable, and it is not permissible to act upon most of it, and confusion and tadlees has occurred in it, so the pious should not act upon everything that is in it (at all), and not rely on what is written in it or imitate its narrations". This shows that Aban is not considered as a reliable source and should be avoided as the Shia scholars said.
