= Mawla =

Arabic word

Mawlā (Arabic: مَوْلَى; IPA: [maw.laː], plural mawālī مَوَالِي; [ma.waː.liː]), is a polysemous Arabic word, whose meaning varied in different periods and contexts. Depending on the context, it could mean master, protector, ally, one with authority, a close associate, friend, supporter, or one deserving loyalty and affection.

Before the Islamic prophet Muhammad, the term applied to any form of tribal association. In the Quran and hadiths it is used in multiple senses, including 'lord', 'guardian', and 'trustee'. After Muhammad's death, the Umayyad dynasty accepted new converts to Islam into Arab-Muslim society and the word mawali gained currency as an appellation for converted non-Arab Muslims in the early Islamic caliphates.

== Etymology ==
The word mawla, which was used by the Islamic prophet Muhammad about Ali in the Ghadir Khumm speech, is derived from the root و ل ي w-l-y, meaning "to be close to" or "to have power over". Mawla can have reciprocal meanings, depending on whether it is used in the active or passive voice: "master" Originally, mawāli were clients of an Arab people, but with the advent of Islam, the term came to refer to non-Arab Muslims and other allies. [needs editing].

Under the Abbasid rulers of the 9th century, the non-Arab converts comprised an important part of the army. The institution of wala' as a requirement to enter Muslim society ceased to exist after the fall of the Umayyads, as the Abbasids favoured a universal interpretation of Islam that was not the exclusive religion of the Arab elite. However, throughout the centuries, the rise of political power of regional Arab dynasties and non-Arab ethnic groups eventually restricted the power of the Abbasid caliph in Baghdad, as Persian, Turkic and Berber Muslims began to form independent and autonomous sultanates.

Abu Hanifa was the founder of the Hanafi school of jurisprudence within Sunni Islam and lived through the Abbasid Revolution. He famously stated in one of his sayings: "The belief of a newly converted Turk is the same as that of an Arab from Hejaz."

This institution continued in the Abbasid period on a much smaller scale when the 8th Abbasid Caliph, al-Mu'tasim, formed private corps entirely composed of non-Arabs in the service of the Caliph. These men were the mawali of the Caliph and were thus considered to be more loyal to the Caliph. This practice persisted throughout Islamic history through to the Ottoman period.

== Ghadir Khumm ==
The word "Moula" is regarded as a considerable word in the Ghadir Khumm event (regarding the sentence which was declared by the Islamic prophet Muhammad in Islam about Ali, when he said: "For whoever I am his moula, 'Ali is his moula."). There have been mentioned meanings for this use of the word "moula", including leader or follower administrator, lord, owner, master, slave, one who has more right in something, wali, an ally, etc. Shias argue that in the context of the sermon (Ghadir Khumm), intended that the word "moula" to be taken as "leader". They therefore see this to be the official designation of Ali as the prophet's successor. While Sunnis hold that such an important announcement cannot be made using such an ambiguous word.

== See also ==
- Ajam
- Jizyah
- Mawlānā
- Mullah
- Shu'ubiyyah
- Umm walad
- Walayah
- Wilayah
