= The Book of Sulaym ibn Qays =

Shia hadith collection attributed to Sulaym ibn Qays

The Book of Sulaym ibn Qays Kitāb Sulaym ibn Qays
- Author: Unknown (falsely attributed to Sulaym ibn Qays) (Note: According to Djebli 1960–2007, "the very existence of this man, and of his work, should be regarded with caution". Modaressi 2003, pp. 82–83 calls it "obvious that such a person never existed and that the name is only a pen name". Other scholars, such as Mohammad Ali Amir-Moezzi, have been more cautious in rejecting Sulaym ibn Qays' historicity, but do agree that the attribution of the work to him is false (see Gleave 2015, pp. 85–86).)
- Language: Arabic
- Subject: Hadith
- Genre: Hadith collection
- Publication date: partly 8th century, with many later additions

The Book of Sulaym ibn Qays (Arabic: كِتَاب سُلَيْم بن قَيْس, romanized: Kitāb Sulaym ibn Qays) is the oldest known Shia hadith collection. It was attributed to Sulaym ibn Qays al-Hilali (died 678), who purportedly entrusted it to Aban ibn Abi Ayyash.

Scholars largely consider the attribution of this work to Sulaym ibn Qays, who himself may have been a legendary figure or a pseudonym, to be false. The earliest known reference to the book was in the Kitāb al-Ghayba by Muhammad ibn Ibrahim al-Nu'mani (tenth century).

The precise dating of the work is not clear. Hossein Modarressi dates the original core of this work to the final years of Hisham ibn Abd al-Malik's reign (r. 723–743), which would make it one of the oldest Islamic books that are still extant. However, it contains many later additions and alterations of unknown date, which may render it impossible to reconstruct the original text. Two individual passages which have been the subject of a case study have been respectively dated to c. 762–780 and to the late 8th or early 9th century.

== Views of medieval scholars ==
Sources indicate that the book was well known, but not always held in high esteem. Ibn al-Nadim (d. 995) said that the book was among the well-known Shia books, and Mohammad-Baqer Majlesi mentioned the book and the author in his book, Al-Ghaibah.

However, the scholars Ahmad ibn Ubayda (d. 941) and Abu Abd Allah al-Ghadhanfari (d. 1020) considered the book to be unreliable on the basis of three factors: a segment in the book indicates there were thirteen Imams instead of the traditionally held twelve; another segment states that Muhammad ibn Abi Bakr rebuked his dying father Abu Bakr despite Muhammad being a three-year-old child; and the book was purportedly transmitted by Aban ibn Abi Ayyash at a time when the latter was only fourteen years old.

== Dating ==
Currently, several variant manuscripts of this book exist, and it has been suggested that content was added to it and altered in it over time.

An analysis of a tafsir-related passage suggests that this passage dates to the early 9th century, or perhaps the late 8th century CE.
