= Hussein Ali Mahfoudh =

Dr Hussain Ali Mahfoudh
- حسين علي محفوظ
- Born: 3 May 1926; Kadhimiya, Kingdom of Iraq
- Died: 12 July 2009 (aged 83); Baghdad, Iraq
- Resting place: Imam Kadhim Shrine
- Education: University of Baghdad (BA); University of Tehran (PhD)
- Writing career
- Notable works: Al-Mutannabi Wa Sa'di; Al-Hadith 'Ind al-Shi'a al-Imamiya; Buyutat al-Kadhimiya

Hussein Ali Mahfoudh (Arabic: حسين علي محفوظ; 3 May 1926 – 19 January 2009) was an Iraqi scholar and author in the field of Semitic languages and Historical studies. He was known as the Shaykh of Baghdad.

== Early life ==
Mahfouz was born in Quraysh Avenue, in Al Kadhimiya, Baghdad into a Shia Muslim family. His father died when he was a child, and so he was raised by his mother and uncle. In elementary school he began writing and translating texts from English to Arabic.

== Academic career ==
After graduating from high school, Mahfouz was accepted at Dar Al-Maualemen (the House of Teachers) college in Baghdad; he graduated in 1948. He then went on to receive his PhD in Comparative literature from the University of Tehran in 1952. After returning to Iraq in 1956 he was appointed as a professor in Dar Al-Maualemen Al-'Aali (the House of Teachers for higher studies), and an inspector of Arabic language in the ministry of knowledge.

In 1961 Mahfouz moved to the USSR to teach Arabic language and literature at Leningrad State University. In 1969 he established the department of Oriental studies at the College of Literature of the University of Baghdad.

== Later career ==
Mahfouz retired from teaching in the late 1990s. He kept a position as a judge of Masters and PhD candidates, until the American invasion of Iraq in 2003. He died in Kadhimiya hospital at the age of 83 with a bibliography of almost 1500 books and articles.

It was claimed by Salem al-Alusi that the late President (Ahmed Hassan al-Bakr) demanded recovery of the remains of Harun al-Rashid al-Khalifa; claiming them to be a symbol of Baghdad during its golden age. This request was furthered by the former minister, Abdul Jabbar Jomard, however, Iran refused and in contest asked to retrieve the remains of Sheikh Abdul Qadir Gilani, given that he was born in Iran. It was during this time that Hussein Ali Mahfouz made a statement about the matter, in Jalawla Festival held by the Union of Arab Historians, infering that it wasn't definitive whether the birthplace village of the Sheikh was in Iran territory. Intervention forces later closed the subject.
