= Laylat al-mabit =

Muhammad's flight from Mecca to Yathrib

Laylat al-mabit (Arabic: لَـیْـلَـة ٱلْـمَـبِـیْـت, lit. 'the overnight stay') refers to the night in 622 CE when the Islamic prophet Muhammad fled Mecca for Medina to evade an assassination plot. Ali, the prophet's cousin and son-in-law, slept in his bed, pretending to be Muhammad so that the assassins who had gathered outside the prophet's house would believe that he was still there. This allowed Muhammad to leave Mecca safely and begin his immigration. The event has been referred to in Quran 2:207 (Verse Laylat al-mabit), which both Shia and Sunni sources interpret as referring to Ali's willingness to sacrifice himself for Muhammad.

== Event ==
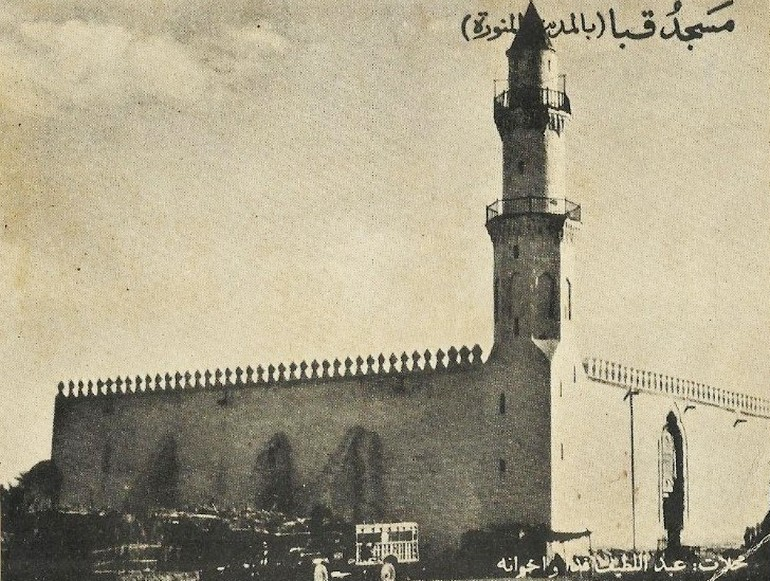
Upon arrival, Muhammad founded the Quba mosque, now located inside Medina, Saudi Arabia

As the harassment of early Muslims in Mecca continued, or perhaps with the hope of better prospects, Muhammad asked his followers to emigrate to the city of Yathrib, whose residents had pledged to protect him there. To attract less attention, Muslims left Mecca in small groups, throughout the summer of 622 CE, while Muhammad remained behind in Mecca to organize and encourage the emigration efforts, or perhaps to ensure an independent position in Yathrib upon his arrival later. Alarmed by the new developments, the Meccan clan leaders decided to murder Muhammad. The plan was for a group of warriors, one from each Meccan clan, to kill Muhammad together to avoid any potential retribution from Muhammad's clan, the Banu Hashim.

An informant, or perhaps the archangel Gabriel, disclosed the assassination plot to Muhammad. To foil their plans, his young cousin Ali ibn Abi Talib risked his life and slept in Muhammad's bed that night instead of him. Alternatively, the historian Ibn Ishaq (d. 767) writes that Muhammad reassured Ali of his safety in advance. At any rate, Muhammad left Mecca in the meantime under cover of darkness, joined later by Abu Bakr, another companion. In a last-minute change of plans, however, the assassins waited until the next morning to attack. At dawn, they broke into the house and found Ali, whose life they spared. He stayed behind in Mecca for a few days after Muhammad's departure to return the goods entrusted to him, who was evidently known in Mecca as al-Amin (lit. 'the trustworthy'). Then Ali too escaped Mecca together with a few Muslim women, including his mother, Fatima bint Asad, and Muhammad's daughter, Fatima. Muhammad is said to have waited outside of Yathrib in Quba for Ali to join him before entering the city on 27 September 622. Yathrib was later renamed Medinat al-Nabi (lit. 'city of the prophet'), or simply Medina, in his honor.

== Mention in the Quran ==
That Ali reputedly risked his life to facilitate Muhammad's safe escape may have been the reason for the revelation of verse 2:207 in the Quran, "But there is also a kind of man who gives his life away to please God, and God is most compassionate to his servants." This was the opinion Ibn Abbas (d. 687), an influential early exegete, and such reports are also found in the works of the Sunni authors al-Tha'labi (d. 1035-6), al-Razi (d. 1209), and al-Haskani, the Shia authors al-Tabarsi (d. 1153), al-Hilli (d. 1325), al-Balaghi (d. 1933), and the Mu'tazilite scholar Ibn Abi'l-Hadid (d. 1258).

== See also ==
- Hijrah
- Ali in the Quran
