= Ghadir Khumm =

Sermon event involving Muhammad and Ali

Coordinates: 22°49′30″N 39°04′30″E

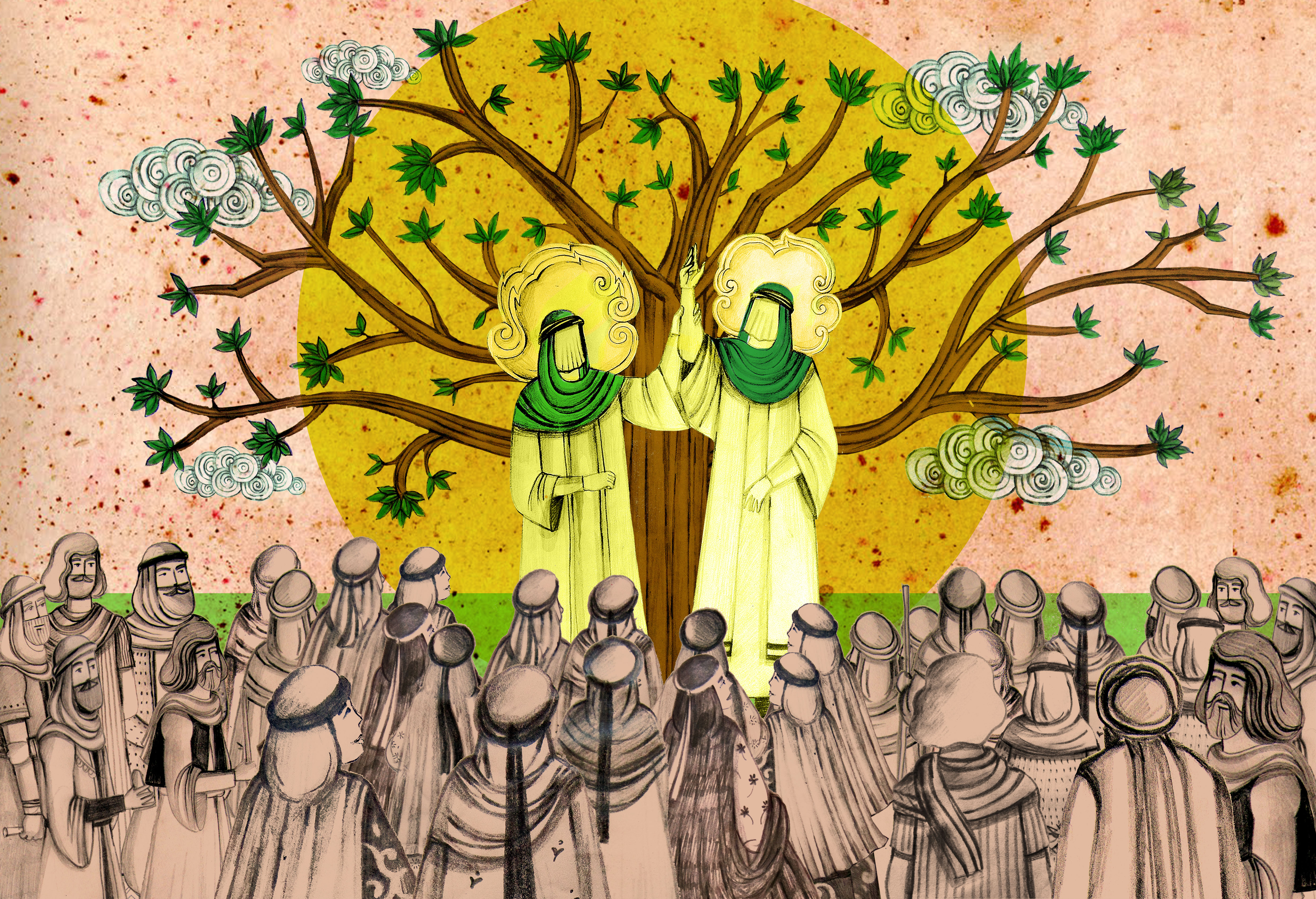
- Modern artwork depicting the Ghadir Khumm
- Date: 10/16 March 632 (18 Dhu al-Hijjah)
- Location: Al-Juhfa, Hejaz, Arabia
- Type: Islamic sermon
- Theme: Muhammad's famous statement about Ali, interpreted by the Sunni as a statement of his esteem for Ali ibn Abi Talib, while claimed by the Shia as evidence of his appointment as Muhammad's successor and as the completion of the message of Islam
- Outcome: The commemorative Eid al-Ghadir involving prayers, gift-giving, festive meals, recitation of the Du'a Nudba

The Ghadir Khumm (Arabic: غَدِير خُمّ) was an event that took place in 16 March 632, shortly before the death of the Islamic prophet Muhammad. The event occurred at a pond known as Ghadir Khumm, located near Juhfa between Mecca and Medina. During the event, Muhammad took his cousin and son-in-law, Ali, by the hand and delivered a speech in which he said: “For whoever I am his mawla, Ali is his mawla.” The term mawlā has several meanings and can be used in different contexts. Depending on the context, it may refer to master, patron, protector, ally, supporter, client, associate, friend, or one with authority. Because mawlā has a wide semantic range, the interpretation of the term is central to the differing Sunni and Shia understandings. The event is particularly significant in Shia Islam, where it is understood as Muhammad's formal designation of Ali as his successor and the first Imam. Shia Muslims interpret the term mawla as meaning leader, authority, or one entitled to obedience. The event is commemorated annually as Eid al-Ghadir on 18 Dhu al-Hijjah.

Sunni Muslims accept that the event of Ghadir Khumm took place and that Muhammad made the statement concerning Ali. However, they do not interpret the statement as an explicit designation of Ali as Muhammad's successor. In Sunni interpretations, mawla refer to a close associate, friend, supporter, or one deserving loyalty and affection. Sunni Muslims regards the declaration as a simple affirmation of Muhammad's esteem for Ali, minimizing the event’s importance. Consequently, the event is understood differently in Sunni and Shia branches and forms an important part of the broader debate over Muhammad's succession. The event has played a central role in the development of Shia doctrines concerning the Imamate and the succession of religious authority after Muhammad.

== Etymology ==
Ghadir Khumm refers both to the gathering of Muslims for Muhammad's sermon and its location, which was a pond (Arabic: غَدِير, romanized: ghadir) fed by a nearby spring in a wadi known as Khumm, situated between the cities of Mecca and Medina. The pond was located near the settlement of al-Juhfa, a strategic trijunction where routes from Medina, Egypt, and Iraq intersected.

The word khumm (Arabic: خُم) has been translated as 'deceiver', and the valley was so named because the water of its pond was saline and unfit for consumption. At the time of the event, the original inhabitants of the region, namely, the Banu Khuza'a and the Banu Kinana tribes, had already abandoned the area due to its poor pasturage and harsh climate. Before Muhammad's address there, the location was likely never used as a caravan stop. In Shia sources, the harsh environment of Ghadir Khumm is seen as emphasizing the urgency of Muhammad's divine task as he sought the largest audience for his address before the pilgrims parted ways.

== Background ==
Ten years after Muhammad's migration to Medina and on the last days of Dhu al-Qadah, Muhammad performed the Hajj rituals in Mecca shortly before his death in 632 CE. This Hajj ceremony has become known as the Farewell Pilgrimage. In a sermon in Mecca (at Arafat), and possibly again at the Ghadir Khumm, Muhammad alerted Muslims about his impending death. After the Hajj, he embarked on the return journey from Mecca to Medina, accompanied by an entourage of Muslims. The announcement at the Ghadir Khumm took place during the return journey among a congregation of these Muslims, possibly numbering in the tens of thousands.

== The sermon ==
At Ghadir Khumm, Muhammad called the Muslim caravan to a halt ahead of the noon congregational prayer, before the pilgrims parted their ways, and then asked for a dais to be raised. After the prayer, Muhammad delivered a sermon to a large number of Muslims in which he emphasized the importance of the Qur'an and his ahl al-bayt (Arabic: أهل البیت, lit. 'people of the house', his family). His statement is widely reported by Sunni and Shia authorities, and the version that appears in Musnad Ibn Hanbal, a canonical Sunni collection of hadiths, reads:

I left among you two treasures which, if you cling to them, you shall not be led into error after me. One of them is greater than the other: The book of God, which is a rope stretched from Heaven to Earth, and my progeny, my ahl al-bayt. These two shall not be parted until they return to the pool [of paradise] (kawthar).

Known as the hadith of the thaqalayn (Arabic: حديث الثقلين, lit. 'saying of the two treasures'), Muhammad might have repeated this statement on multiple occasions, and indeed several similar variants of this hadith can be found in Sunni and Shia sources alike. For instance, the version that appears in al-Sunan al-kubra, another canonical Sunni source, also includes the warning, "Be careful how you treat the two [treasures] after me." Taking Ali by the hand, Muhammad then asked if he was not awla (lit. 'have more authority over' or 'closer to') the believers than themselves, evidently a reference to verse 33:6 of the Qur'an. When they affirmed, he declared,

"He whose mawla I am, Ali is his mawla," (Arabic: من كنت مولاه فعلي مولاه)

which is known as the hadith of the walaya (Arabic: وَلاية, lit. 'spiritual authority') in Shia theology. Muhammad might have repeated this sentence three or four more times, as reported in Musnad Ibn Hanbal. He then continued, "O God, befriend the friend of Ali and be the enemy of his enemy," according to some versions, including the Sunni Shawahid al-tanzil and the Shia Nahj al-haqq. The Sunni scholars Ibn Kathir (d. 1373) and Ahmad ibn Hanbal (d. 855) relate that Muhammad's companion 'Umar congratulated Ali after the sermon and told him, "You have now become mawla of every faithful man and woman."

== Historicity ==
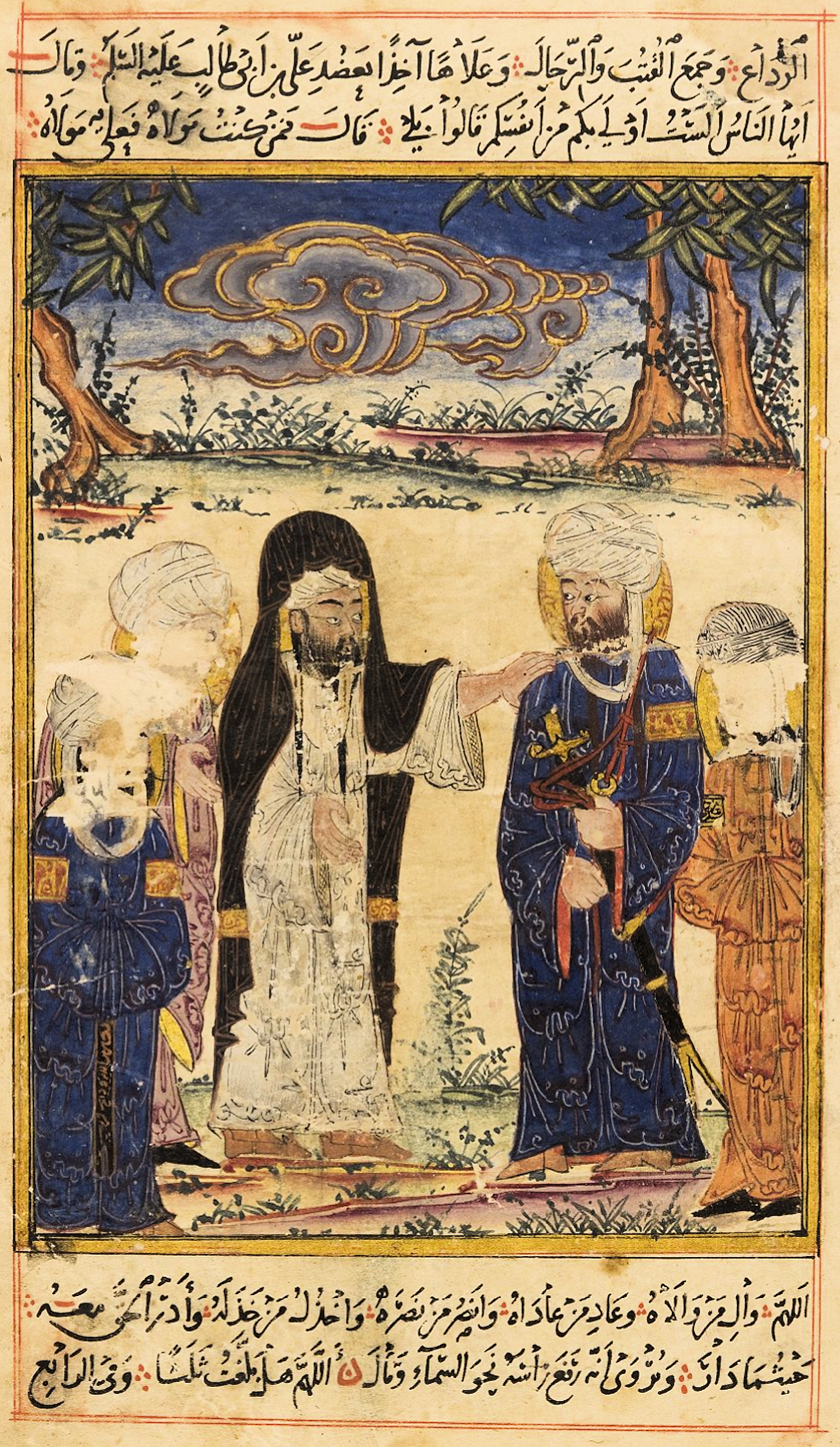
The Investiture of Ali by Muhammad at Ghadir Khumm, 1307 AD Ilkhanid manuscript.

The historicity of the Ghadir Khumm is rarely disputed within the Muslim community, as its recorded tradition is "among the most extensively acknowledged and substantiated (Arabic: تواتر, romanized: tawatur)" in classical Islamic sources. Nevertheless, several variations exist in the early sources, and there is a significant weight of different accounts. The narrative of the Ghadir Khumm is, for instance, preserved in Chronology of Ancient Nations by the Sunni polymath al-Biruni (d. c. 1050), which survives in an early fourteenth-century Ilkhanid copy by Ibn al-Kutbi. The Shia inclination of those responsible for this copy is evident from its illustrations of Ali, including one entitled The Investiture of Ali at Ghadir Khumm.

Accounts of the Ghadir Khumm appear elsewhere in both Sunni and Shia sources, and these accounts have occasionally been used interchangeably without sectarian prejudice. For instance, the Shia scholar Abdul Hosein Amini (d. 1970) relied on Sunni and Shia sources to list over a hundred companions and eighty-four tabi'un who had recounted the event, most of whom are now counted among Sunnis. Similar efforts were undertaken by the Shia authors Hamid H. Musavi (d. 1888) and Hussein A. Mahfouz (d. 2006). Other early accounts of the event include those by the Shia-leaning historian al-Ya'qubi (d. 897–898), and by the Sunni scholars Ibn Hanbal, Ibn Kathir, Ibn Asakir (d. 1176), al-Tirmidhi (d. 892), al-Nasa'i (d. 915), Ibn Maja (d. 887), Ibn al-Athir (d. 1232–1233), Ibn Abd al-Barr (d. 1071), Ibn Abd Rabbih (d. 940), and Jahiz (d. 869).

Some Sunni historians, such as al-Tabari (d. 923), Ibn Hisham (d. 833), and Ibn Sa'd (d. 784–785), have nonetheless made little or no mention of the Ghadir Khumm, perhaps because the event supports the Shia legitimist claims, or perhaps they wanted to avoid angering their Sunni rulers by supporting the Shia cause. Consequently, Western authors, whose works were based on these authors, also make little reference to the Ghadir Khumm. Even though the Ghadir Khumm is absent from Tarikh al-Tabari, its author narrates how Muhammad publicly dismissed some complaints about the conduct of Ali in Yemen in the same "chronological slot" as the Ghadir Khumm. The Islamicist Maria M. Dakake thus suggests that al-Tabari deliberately replaced the Ghadir Khumm tradition with another one that praised Ali but lacked any spiritual and legitimist implications in favor of Shia. Alternatively, in the ninth-century Baghdad, some among the Sunni group Ahl al-Hadith apparently denied the event, which may have prompted al-Tabari to refute their claims in his nonextant book al-Walaya, or in his unfinished Kitab al-Fada'il. Similarly, as a senior employee of the Shia Buyid dynasty, the Shia theologian Sharif al-Radi (d. 1016) does not mention the Ghadir Khumm in his Nahj al-balagha, possibly to avoid the ire of the Sunni Abbasids.

=== Links to the Qur'an ===
In Shia and some Sunni sources, two verses of the Qur'an are associated with the Ghadir Khumm: verse 5:3, which announces the perfection of Islam, and verse 5:67, which urges Muhammad to fulfill his divine instructions. The latter, sometimes known as the verse of tabligh (Arabic: تبليغ, lit. 'proclamation'), has been linked to the Ghadir Khumm by the Sunni exegetes al-Suyuti (d. 1505) and al-Razi (d. 1210), and the Shi'a exegete al-Qumi (d. 939), among others. The verse of tabligh warns Muhammad:

O Messenger! Convey that which has been sent down unto thee from thy Lord, and if thou dost not, thou wilt not have conveyed His message. And God will protect thee from mankind. Surely God guides not disbelieving people.

Revealed before the Ghadir Khumm, according to the Shi'a, this verse spurred Muhammad to deliver his announcement about 'Ali, which he had delayed fearing the reaction of some of his companions. Sunnis offer different views, one of which connects this verse to Muhammad's criticism of Jews and Christians. Nevertheless, the verse of tabligh is highly likely linked to the events that followed the Farewell Pilgrimage, including the Ghadir Khumm, because chapter (sura) five of the Qur'an is often associated with Muhammad's final years in Medina. Verse 5:3 of the Qur'an, also known as the verse of ikmal al-din (Arabic: إِکْمَال الدِّيْن, lit. 'perfection of religion'), is similarly connected to the Ghadir Khumm in some Sunni reports by al-Tabari and the Sunni exegete al-Baghdadi (d. 1071), and by the Shia exegete al-Tusi (d. 1067), among others. In contrast, most Sunni commentators associate this verse with the Farewell Pilgrimage, and this is also the opinion of al-Ya'qubi. Among various Sunni views, the verse of ikmal al-din may refer to the establishment of the rites for Hajj during the Farewell Pilgrimage or the closure of Islamic legislation with the revelation of dietary instructions in the remainder of this verse, although some injunctions about riba were possibly revealed after this verse. The verse of ikmal al-din includes the passage:

This day those who disbelieve have despaired of your religion. So fear them not, but fear Me! This day I have perfected for you your religion, and completed My Blessing upon you, and have approved for you as religion, Submission (Islam).

=== Other literary references ===
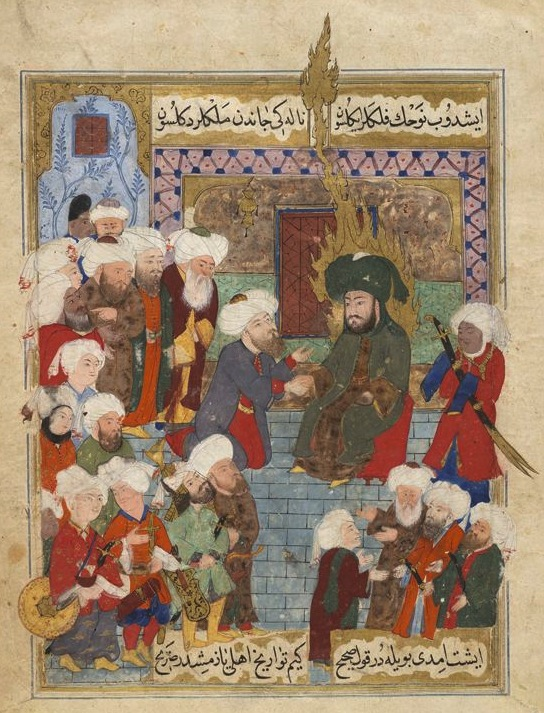
Ali publicly referred to the Ghadir Khumm during his caliphate. He is shown here receiving the pledge of allegiance in a manuscript by the Ottoman Sufi writer and poet Lami'i, 16th century.

The Ghadir Khumm has also been preserved in the Arabic literature. The earliest such instance is a disputed poem attributed to Hassan ibn Thabit (d. 674), who accompanied Muhammad during the pilgrimage. For instance, the poem is quoted by the prominent Shia theologian al-Mufid (d. 1022). The poem appears also in some other Shia and Sunni sources, according to the Islamicist Husain M. Jafri (d. 2019). Included in this poem is the verse, "Stand up, O Ali, for I find only you to be an imam and a guide after I [Muhammad] depart." In regards to its authenticity, Mohammad A. Amir-Moezzi, another expert, does not find this attribution problematic, while Jafri considers it highly improbable that these events would have passed unrecorded by Ibn Thabit, who was the "official poet-reporter of Muhammad." By contrast, the Islamicists Josef Horovitz (d. 1931) and Ignác Goldziher (d. 1921) reject the veracity of this poem. The Shia al-Kumayt ibn Zayd (d. 743) is another early poet who composed verses on the same theme.

=== Historical references ===
On one occasion during his caliphate, Ali is known to have asked Muslims to come forward with their testimonies about the Ghadir Khumm. In doing so, he may have publicly laid claim to a spiritual and political authority greater than others, particularly his predecessors. Muhammad's statement at the Ghadir Khumm, "O God, befriend the friend of Ali and be the enemy of his enemy," was likely the standard formula for pledging allegiance at that time. Indeed, Ali and his son Hasan both demanded a similar pledge from their supporters during their caliphates. The hadith of the walaya is also cited by Ammar ibn Yasir, a companion of Muhammad, to support the legitimacy of Ali's caliphate in the account of the Shia historian Ibn A'tham al-Kufi (ninth century) of the negotiations before the Battle of Siffin (657). This might be the earliest such reference in historical sources.

== Interpretation ==
=== Mawla ===
While the authenticity of the Ghadir Khumm is rarely contested, its interpretation is a source of controversy between Sunni and Shia. Mawla (Arabic: مولى) is a polysemous Arabic word, the meanings of which have varied in different periods and contexts. The Arabic root w-l-y (و-ل-ي) of the word mawla describes affinity and proximity between two parties, and the word itself can therefore have opposite meanings, namely, 'master', 'leader', 'patron', 'beloved', 'supporter', 'freed slave', 'friend', 'client', and 'neighbor'. Before the Islamic era, the term may have applied to any form of tribal association, whereas, in the Qur'an and hadith literature, the word mawla and its cognate wali can mean 'Lord', 'master', 'trustee', 'guardian', 'helper', 'protecting friend', 'freed slave', and (spiritual or material) 'heir'.

In the context of the Ghadir Khumm, the interpretation of the word mawla tends to be split along sectarian lines. Shia sources interpret this word as meaning 'leader', 'master', and 'patron', while Sunni accounts of this sermon tend to offer little explanation, or interpret the hadith as a statement of love or support, or substitute the word mawla with its cognate wali (of God, lit. 'friend of God'). Shias therefore view the Ghadir Khumm as the investiture of Ali with Muhammad's religious and political authority (walaya), while Sunnis regard the event as an indication of the rapport between the two men, or that Ali should execute Muhammad's will. At any rate, the correct interpretation of the polysemous word mawla depends on its context. In his sermon, Muhammad may have employed the word mawla synonymously to his earlier word awla ('in charge of the believers more than themselves', awla bi-kum min anfusi-kum). This then supports the Shia interpretation of the word mawla in the sense of authority (awla bi al-tasarruf). Alternatively, the Sunni theologian al-Baqillani (d. 1013) rejects any connection between the immediate uses of awla and mawla by Muhammad.

=== Shia view ===
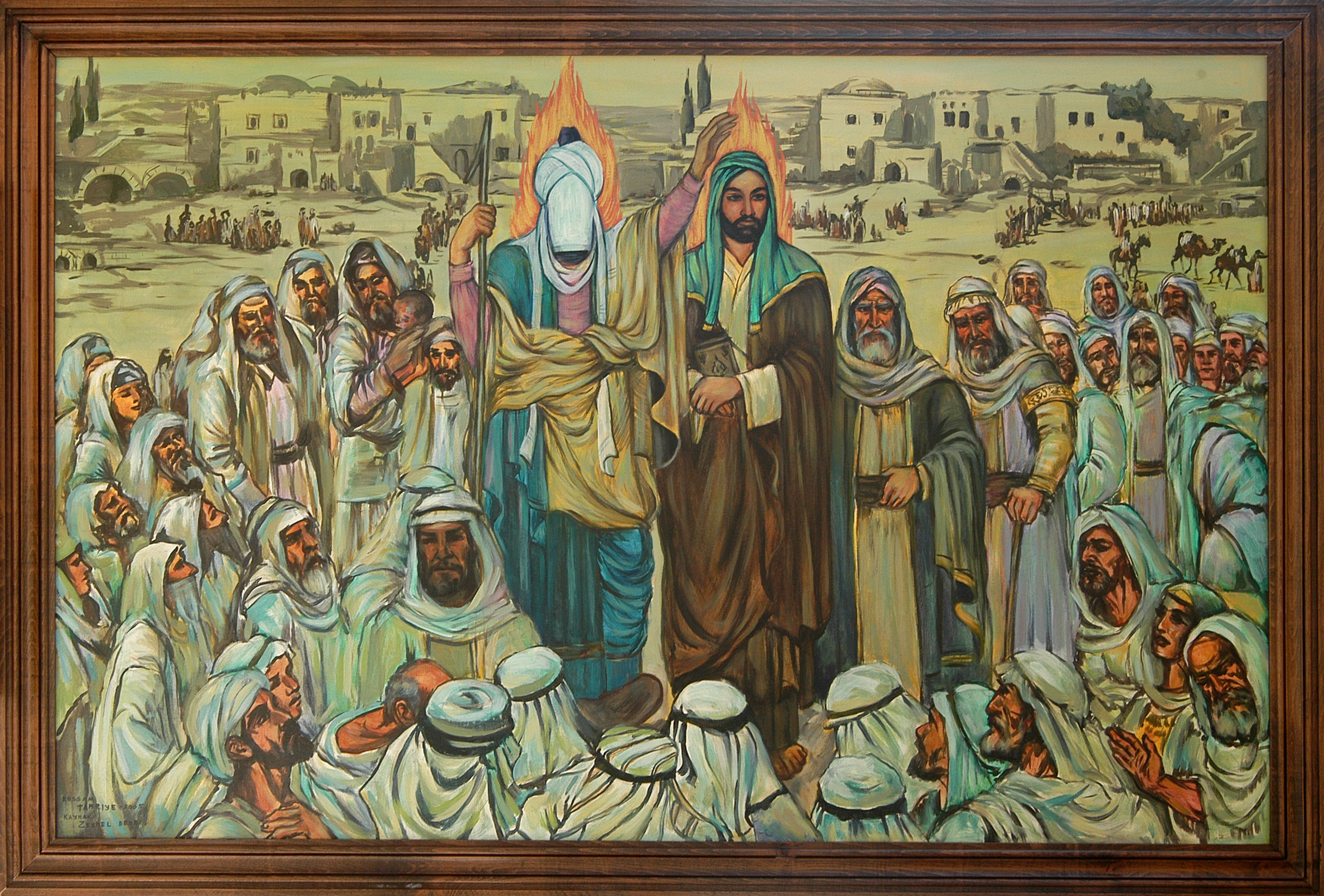
Modern Shia artwork depicting the Ghadir Khumm.

For Shia Muslims, the Ghadir Khumm signifies the investiture of Ali with the guardianship (walaya) of the Muslim community after Muhammad. In particular, for them this was his most public announcement about the succession of Ali. Shia accounts describe how Umar and other companions visited Ali after the sermon to congratulate and pledge their allegiance to him, even addressing him as amir al-mu'minin (Arabic: أَمِيْر ٱلْمُؤْمِنِيْن, lit. 'commander of the believers').

For Shias, the dramatic announcement at the Ghadir Khumm to thousands of Muslims in the heat of day hardly supports its Sunni interpretation of love (Arabic: محبة, romanized: muhabba) and support (Arabic: نصرة, romanized: nusra) for Ali. These two are also the obligations of every Muslim towards other Muslims, not just Ali. While the Sunni Ibn Kathir considers the Ghadir Khumm a response to complaints about Ali during his expedition to Yemen, the Shia jurist Ibn Shahrashub (d. 1192) argues that Muhammad had earlier dismissed those objections. As for the various meanings of the word mawla, the standard practice in Shia theology is to eliminate all those meanings in the hadith one by one until only the meaning of authority remains.

=== Sunni view ===
Among Sunni Muslims, the Ghadir Khumm is not associated with the succession to Muhammad. Instead, the event is often connected to Ali's campaign in Yemen, from which he had just returned prior to the Farewell Pilgrimage. Ali is said to have strictly imposed the Islamic guidelines for the distribution of booty and that reportedly angered some soldiers. Ibn Kathir, for instance, sides with Ali in his account of the episode but also suggests that the Ghadir Khumm sermon was simply intended as a public declaration of Muhammad's love and esteem for Ali in light of the earlier events.

For Sunnis, it is also unimaginable that most companions would act wrongly and ignore a clear appointment of Ali at the Ghadir Khumm. Indeed, some suggest that the Muslim community did not act as if they had heard about such an appointment, and thus consider this designation improbable. By contrast, Shias believe that the community deliberately ignored the designation of Ali, pointing to the designation of the second caliph Umar by his predecessor Abu Bakr, other historical evidence, and that majority does not imply legitimacy in the Qur'an. Some have instead argued that Muhammad would have made such an important announcement earlier, during the Hajj, while others consider this tantamount to criticizing Muhammad's judgement.

== Eid al-Ghadir ==
While 18 Dhu al-Hijjah is not a significant day on the Sunni calendar, Shia Muslims celebrate this day as the Eid al-Ghadir, the day on which Islam was completed as a religion by the appointment of Ali as Muhammad's successor. In a hadith attributed to Muhammad recorded by Ibn Babawayh, Muhammad considers Ghadir Khum to be the best and highest of the festivals of his Ummah. Specific rituals for Eid al-Ghadir have been narrated by Shia Imams. Fasting on Eid al-Ghadir is one of the recommended and emphasized ones. Shias honor the holiday by making pilgrimages to the city of Karbala in Iraq.

== See also ==
- Succession to Muhammad
- Verse of the walaya
- Hadith of the twelve successors
- Mubahala with the Najrani Christians
- Hadith of the warning
