= Hadith of the position =

Hadith that compares Ali and Aaron

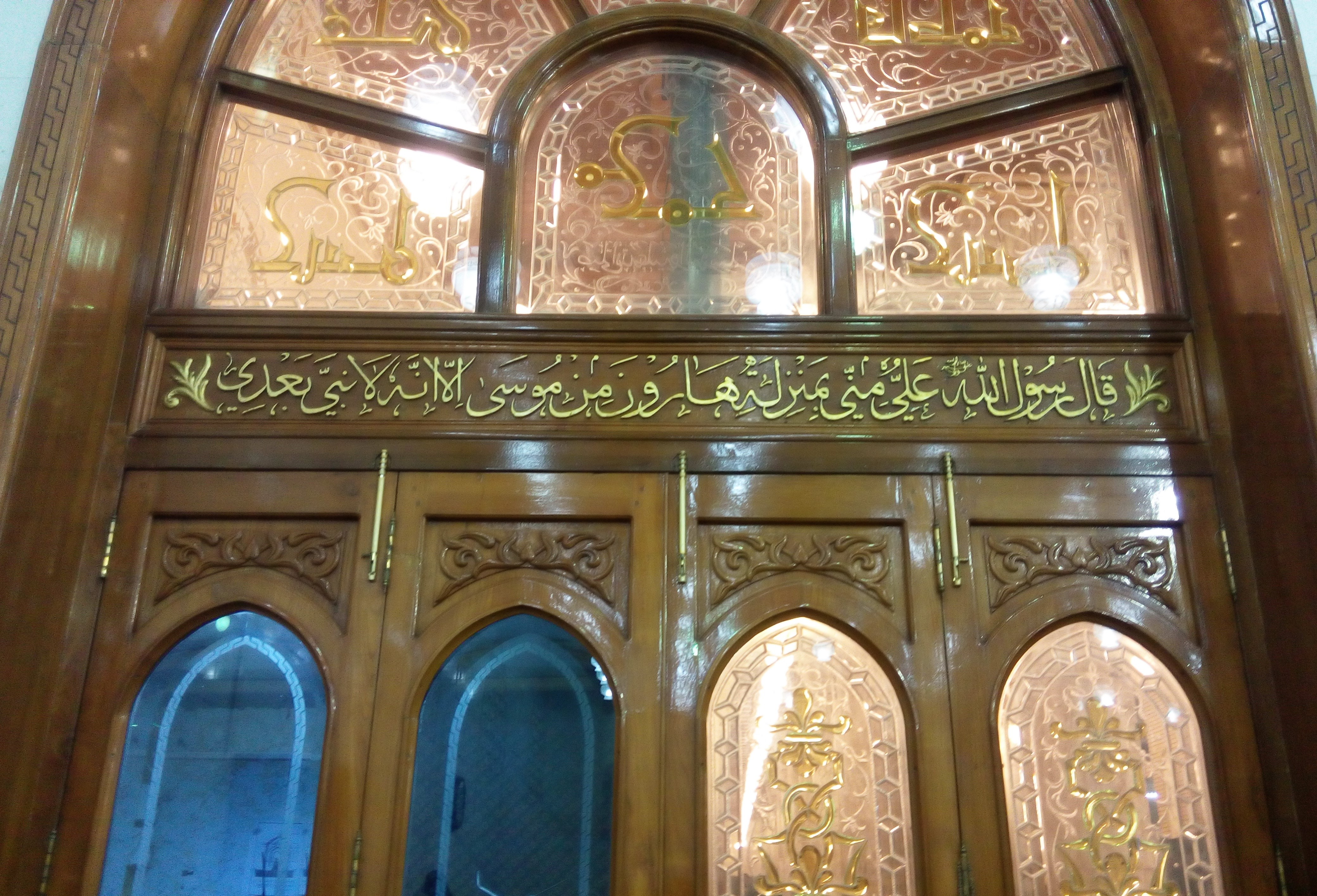
Hadith of the Position engraved on a door of the Great Mosque of Kufa, a holy site in Shia Islam. It is the place where Ali lived, led prayers, and was assassinated.

The Hadith of the position (Arabic: حديث المنزلة, romanized: hadith al-manzila) is a widely-reported saying (hadith), attributed to the Islamic prophet Muhammad, that equates the standing of his cousin and son-in-law Ali to him with the standing of Aaron to Moses, with the exception that there is no prophet after Muhammad.

In Shia Islam, this hadith is cited as evidence for Ali's right to succeed Muhammad. In Sunni Islam, the Hadith of Position is understood as affirming the special status and closeness of Ali to Muhammad, while emphasizing the finality of Muhammad's prophethood.

== Hadith of the position ==
The Sunni historian Ibn Hisham (d. 833) ascribes to the Islamic prophet Muhammad,

Are you not content, Ali, to stand to me as Aaron stood to Moses, except that there will be no prophet after me?

A slightly different wording of this hadith appears in Sahih Muslim, a canonical Sunni collection of traditions. It is also found in similar canonical Sunni compilations Sahih al-Bukhari, Sahih at-Tirmidhi, and Sunan Ibn Maja. Musnad Ibn Hanbal, another Sunni collection of hadiths, includes ten similar variants of this hadith. Elsewhere in Sunni literature, this tradition is also reported by Ibn Hisham (d. 833) in his biographical al-Sira al-nabawiyya and by Ibn Sa'd (d. 845) in his collective biography, al-Tabaqat al-kabir. This tradition also exists with similar wordings in Shia sources, such as Kitab al-Kafi, a large anthology of hadiths compiled by the Shia traditionist al-Kulayni (d. 941), and the theological Da'a'im by the Shia jurist al-Qadi al-Nu'man (d. 974).

== Context ==
The hadith of the position is associated with multiple occasions, including the two pacts of brotherhood between Muhammad and Ali, one before and one shortly after their migration to Medina. Muhammad likely made this biblical analogy also at the Ghadir Khumm, shortly before his death in 632 CE.

Most frequently, however, the hadith of the position is linked to the Expedition of Tabuk in 630–631 against the Byzantine Empire. He is said to have left Ali in charge at Medina before leaving on his longest expedition. After he left, rumors surfaced that Ali was left behind because he was a burden to Muhammad, according to Ibn Hisham. Upon hearing this, his account continues, Ali left Medina and caught up with Muhammad, possibly in al-Jurf. He reassured him, "Are you not content, Ali, to stand to me as Aaron stood to Moses, except that there will be no prophet after me?" The prominent Shia theologian al-Mufid (d. 1022) includes a more detailed response in his Kitab al-Irshad,

"Go back to your position, brother," the prophet said to him [i.e., Ali]. "Medina will only be properly looked after by myself and by you. You are my deputy (khalifa) among my family (ahl al-bayt) and in the place of my emigration and my people. Are you not content, Ali, that you have the same rank with regard to me as Aaron had with regard to Moses, except that there is no prophet after me?

Most accounts of the expedition hold that Ali governed Medina in the absence of Muhammad, including those found in the Sahihs by al-Bukhari, Muslim, and al-Tirmidhi. Alternatively, some Sunni authors place others in charge of Medina. In particular, al-Halabi (d. 1635) names three candidates, while Ibn Kathir (d. 1373) and Mughulta'i (d. 1361) name two. Ibn Kathir also includes a report that Ali was left only in charge of Muhammad's family and not Medina, although he also acknowledges the opposite views in the Sahihs.

Related to this biblical analogy, Muhammad is said to have named his two grandsons, that is, the two sons of Ali, after the two sons of Aaron. More specifically, he reputedly named Hasan and Husayn after Shabbar and Shabbir. This connection is apparently well-known today in South Asia, and in Persian and Urdu literatures.

== Status of Aaron ==
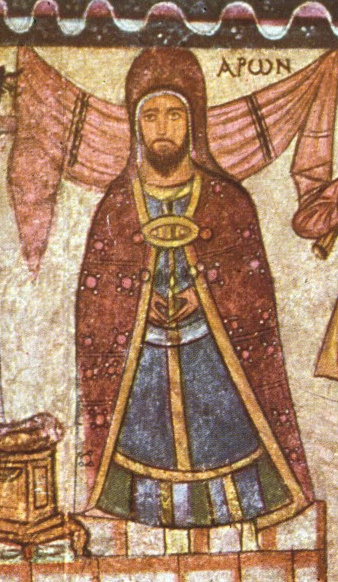
Aaron in priestly garments, a temple painting in the Dura-Europos synagogue

The Quran and rabbinic literature are replete with references to the special status of Aaron and his progeny. In verses 20:29–32 of the Quran, Moses asks God to include his brother Aaron in his prophetic mission. His prayer is answered by God, as evidenced by verses 20:36–42, 25:35, and 28:35. Aaron thus becomes the chosen associate of Moses in his prophetic mission and in revelation, as described in verses 21:48–9 and 2:248 of the Quran. In Hebrew Bible, Aaron performs miracles and is entrusted with the esoteric knowledge of the scripture.

=== Descendants of Aaron ===
Also related here are the divine prerogatives bestowed upon the descendants of Aaron, as represented by this proclamation in the Hebrew Bible, "Behold, I give unto him [i.e., Aaron] My covenant of peace. And he shall have it, and his seed after him, even the covenant of an everlasting priesthood." This divine elevation of the prophets' families above others is also a recurring theme in the Quran, where the families of Muhammad and the past prophets are given a prominent role. In the Quran, God often selects the spiritual and material heirs to the previous prophets from their own kin.

=== Golden calf ===
Aaron failed to prevent the Israelites from returning to idolatry, notes the Islamicist Gurdofarid Miskinzoda. She also suggests that Aaron joined the Israelites in worshiping their idol, although this is questioned by the Islamic philosopher Hossein Nasr and his coauthors who note that Aaron rebuked the Israelites and enjoined them to worship God in verse 20:90 of the Quran. Joseph Lumbard, another expert, writes that verse 20:88 of the Quran identifies Samiri as responsible for the idolatry of the Israelites.

=== Shia and Sufi views ===
In Shia and Sufi sources, Moses fulfills the function of prophecy (nubuwwa) and Aaron that of sainthood (walaya), as with Muhammad and Ali, respectively. In Isma'ili Shia, Moses is counted as one of the seven 'speaking' prophets who brought divine laws to their followers, whereas Aaron is one of the seven 'silent' prophets who conveyed the hidden message of divine revelations to a select group of believers.

== Significance in Shia Islam ==
=== Succession to Muhammad ===
As early as al-Kulayni, Shia authors have invoked the hadith of the position as evidence of the (usurped) right of Ali to succeed Muhammad. For instance, al-Mufid writes that this hadith invested in Ali all the privileges of Aaron, except prophethood. In particular, Ali was the deputy of Muhammad just as Aaron was the deputy of Moses, which readily implies that Ali was the rightful successor of Muhammad, so the argument goes.

Similarly, the contemporary author Reza Aslan notes the succession of the previous prophets by their kin in the Quran and the analogy between Ali and Aaron in the hadith of the position. On this basis, he then argues that Ali was the natural successor of Muhammad and that his exclusion from the Saqifa affair after the death of Muhammad in 632 was a deliberate move. The exclusion of Ali, says Aslan, reflected the Quraysh's fear of combining prophethood and caliphate in the Banu Hashim (Muhammad's clan), lest they would grow too powerful. A conversation to this effect between the Hashemite Ibn Abbas and the second caliph Umar (r. 634–644) is also cited by Wilferd Madelung (d. 2023) and Moojan Momen, two modern Islamicists.

=== Imamate ===
A broader Shia interpretation of the hadith of the position is that its biblical analogy attaches the authority of Ali and his select descendants to the authority of Muhammad, implying that the political and spiritual leadership of the Shia imams is the natural continuation of Muhammad's prophetic authority. Connected with this hadith is also the Shia belief that their imams have inherited the prophet's esoteric knowledge and his functions, excluding only direct revelation. In particular, the divinely-inspired Shia imams are believed to be the interpreters par excellence of the inner dimension (batin) of the Quran, and these 'two weights' are said to never separate in the prophetic hadith of the thaqalayn (lit. 'two weights').

== Significance in Sunni Islam ==
The Sunni historian al-Shahrastani (d. 1153) writes that the descendants of Muhammad have inherited a special knowledge of the Quran, just as the descendants of Aaron possess a special version of the Torah. In his commentary of Sahih Muslim, the Sunni traditionist al-Nawawi (d. 1277) acknowledges the Shia implications of this hadith. So do al-Halabi in his al-Sira and the contemporary Siddiqi in his edition of Sahih Muslim. Despite its Shia coloring, however, the hadith of the position has remained in Sunni sources, perhaps because it serves as an important piece of evidence for the finality of Muhammad in the chain of prophets.

== Debates ==
In response to Shia claims, Sunni scholars argue that the hadith of the position is irrelevant to Muhammad's succession because Aaron died before Moses. The Shia jurist Sharif al-Murtada (d. 1044) counters that had Aaron survived Moses, the former would have indeed succeeded the latter. In this vein, the Shia al-Kulayni claims that Moses' successor Joshua later designated the progeny of Aaron to succeed him instead of his own or Moses' descendants.

Alternatively, the Sunni scholars al-Baqillani (d. 1013) and al-Juwayni (d. 1085) have limited the scope of the hadith of the position to imply only the temporary deputyship of Ali in Medina, similar to the temporary deputyship of Aaron when Moses went to Mount Sinai. If this was indeed a temporary assignment, the Shia theologian Abu al-Fawaris counters, then Muhammad's exclusion of Ali from prophethood would have been unnecessary.

The Sunni scholar Siddiqi rejects the Shia interpretation of the hadith of the position, saying that it refers to the family ties between Muhammad and Ali rather than the caliphate. He argues, "Aaron was the cousin of Moses and so was the case with Ali and the holy prophet." This is rejected by Miskinzoda, who notes that the Quran frequently refers to Aaron as a brother of Moses in verses 7:142, 19:53, and 28:25. In Jewish tradition, Exodus 6:20 similarly holds that Jochebed bore Amran (Imran) his two sons, namely, Aaron and Moses. Nevertheless, for Miskinzoda, that Aaron was Moses' brother whereas Ali was Muhammad's cousin is a limitation of the biblical analogy in the hadith of the position. She suggests that perhaps the two pacts of brotherhood (mu'akha) between Muhammad and Ali partially addressed this limitation by emphasizing the closeness of the two men.

== See also ==
- Succession to Muhammad
- Ghadir Khumm
- Saqifa
- Hadith of the thaqalayn
- Hadith of the twelve successors
- Hadith of the City of Knowledge
