= Ali =

Shia Imam (632–661) and Rashidun caliph (656–661)

Ali علي
- Amir al-Mu'minin; Asadullāh; Ḥaydar al-Karrār; Walī-u-Allāh; Al-Murtaḍā; Abū Turāb; Abū al-Ḥasan
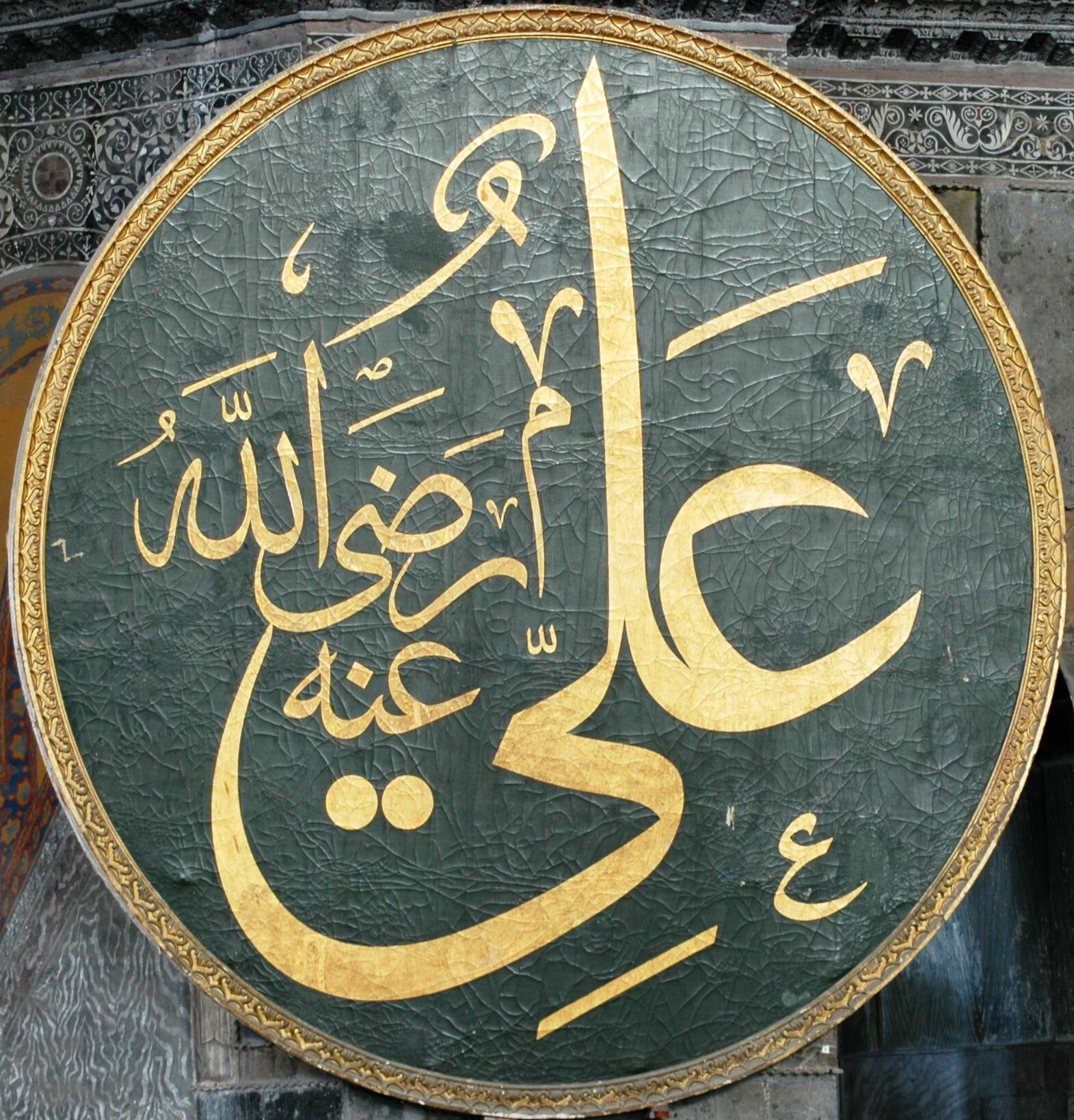
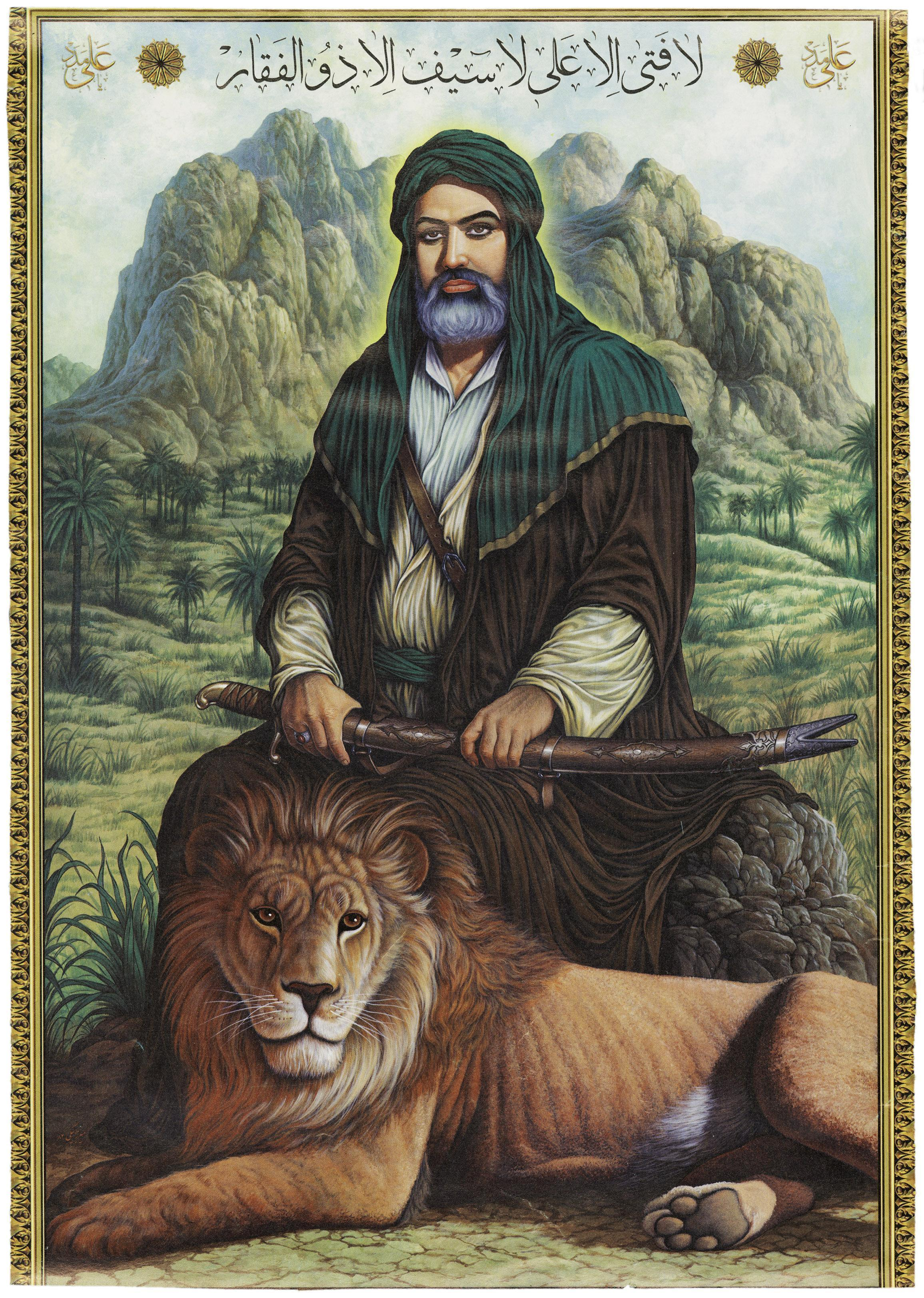
- Calligraphic seal featuring Ali's name, on display in the Hagia Sophia, Istanbul, Turkey Depiction of Ali with his sword Zulfiqar in the Shia tradition by Abolfazl Mirzabeygi, 1978

4th Caliph of the Rashidun Caliphate
- Reign: 17 June 656 – 28 January 661 (4 years, 226 days)
- Predecessor: Uthman
- Successor: Hasan ibn Ali (as Caliph)

1st Shia Imam
- In office 8 June 632 – 28 January 661
- Preceded by: Established position
- Succeeded by: Hasan ibn Ali
- Born: c. 600 CE; Mecca, Hejaz, Arabia
- Died: c. 28 January 661 CE (aged 60–61) (c. 21 Ramadan 40 AH); Kufa, Rashidun Caliphate
- Cause of death: Fatally wounded after being struck on the head by a poison-coated sword
- Burial: Imam Ali Shrine, Najaf, Iraq; 31.996111°N 44.314167°E
- Spouse: Fatima bint Muhammad; Umama bint Abi al-As; Fatima bint Huzam; Asma bint Umais; Khawla bint Jaʿfar; Layla bint Mas'ud; Al-Sahba bint Rabi'a; Umm Sa'id bint Urwa; Muhayya bint Imrul Kays
- Issue: Descendants of Ali: Hasan; Husayn; Zaynab; Umm Kulthum; Muhsin; Muhammad al-Hanafiyya; Abbas; Ruqayya; Umm al-Hasan; Ramla; Fakhitah; Khadija; Fatima; Maymunah; Umm Abiha; Nafisa; Jumana; Umm al-Kiram; Umm al-Salama; Umamah; Abdullah; Ubaydullah; Ja'far; Muhammad al-Awsat; Uthman; Umar; Abu Bakr; Muhammad al-Asghar
- Tribe: Quraysh (Banu Hashim)
- Father: Abu Talib ibn Abd al-Muttalib
- Mother: Fatima bint Asad
- Religion: Islam

Ali ibn Abi Talib (Arabic: عليّ بن أبي طالب, romanized: ʿAlī ibn Abī Ṭālib; c. 600 – c. 28 January 661 CE) was the fourth Rashidun caliph who ruled from 656 CE until his assassination in 661, as well as the first Shia Imam. He was the cousin and son-in-law of the Islamic prophet Muhammad. Born to Abu Talib ibn Abd al-Muttalib and Fatima bint Asad, Ali was raised in the household of his cousin Muhammad and was among the first to accept his teachings.

Ali played a pivotal role in the early years of Islam when Muslims were severely persecuted in Mecca. After the immigration (hijra) to Medina in 622, Muhammad gave his daughter Fatima to Ali in marriage and swore a pact of brotherhood with him. Ali served as Muhammad's secretary and deputy in this period, and was the flag-bearer of his army. Numerous sayings of Muhammad praise Ali, the most controversial of which was uttered in 632 at the Ghadir Khumm, "Whoever I am his mawla, then Ali is his mawla." The interpretation of the polysemous Arabic word mawla is disputed: for Shia Muslims, Muhammad thus invested Ali with his religious and political authority, while Sunni Muslims view this as a mere statement of friendship and rapport. When Muhammad died in the same year, a group of Muslims met in the absence of Ali and appointed Abu Bakr (r. 632–634) as their leader. Ali later relinquished his claims to leadership and resigned from public life during the reigns of Abu Bakr and his successor, Umar (r. 634–644). Even though his advice was occasionally sought, the conflicts between Ali and the first two caliphs are epitomized by his refusal to follow their practices. This refusal cost Ali the caliphate to the benefit of Uthman (r. 644–656), who was thus appointed to succeed Umar by the electoral council. Ali was also highly critical of Uthman, who was widely accused of nepotism and corruption. Yet Ali also repeatedly mediated between the caliph and the provincial dissidents angered by his policies.

Following Uthman's assassination in 656, Muhammad's companions and the people of Medina urged Ali to assume the leadership and pledged their allegiance to him. After initially hesitating, he eventually accepted and became the fourth Rashidun caliph. His caliphate was confronted by two major rebellions, led by Talha and Zubayr, and Muhammad's widow Aisha, who sought to avenge Uthman's death. They were defeated by Ali at the Battle of the Camel in 656. The second rebellion was led by Mu'awiya, whose forces fought Ali at the inconclusive Battle of Siffin in 657, followed by an arbitration process that alienated a group of Ali's army. They became known as the Kharijites, who rebelled against him and were all crushed by Ali at the Battle of Nahrawan in 658, consequently losing control of Egypt. Ali was assassinated in 661 during the month of Ramadan by the Kharijite dissident Ibn Muljam. He was succeeded by his eldest son, Hasan, who abdicated later that year, paving the way for Mu'awiya to seize power and found the dynastic Umayyad Caliphate.

Muslims revere Ali as an example of courage, honesty, devotion to Islam, magnanimity, and equal treatment of all Muslims. For his admirers, he has thus become the archetype of uncorrupted Islam and pre-Islamic chivalry. Sunni Muslims regard him as the last of the rashidun (lit. 'rightly-guided') caliphs, while Shia Muslims venerate him as their first Imam and the rightful religious and political successor to Muhammad. Ali's place is said to be second only to Muhammad in Shia Muslim culture. The shrine of Ali in Najaf, Iraq, is a major destination for Shia pilgrimage. The legacy of Ali is collected and studied in numerous books, the most famous of which is Nahj al-balagha.

== Birth and early life ==
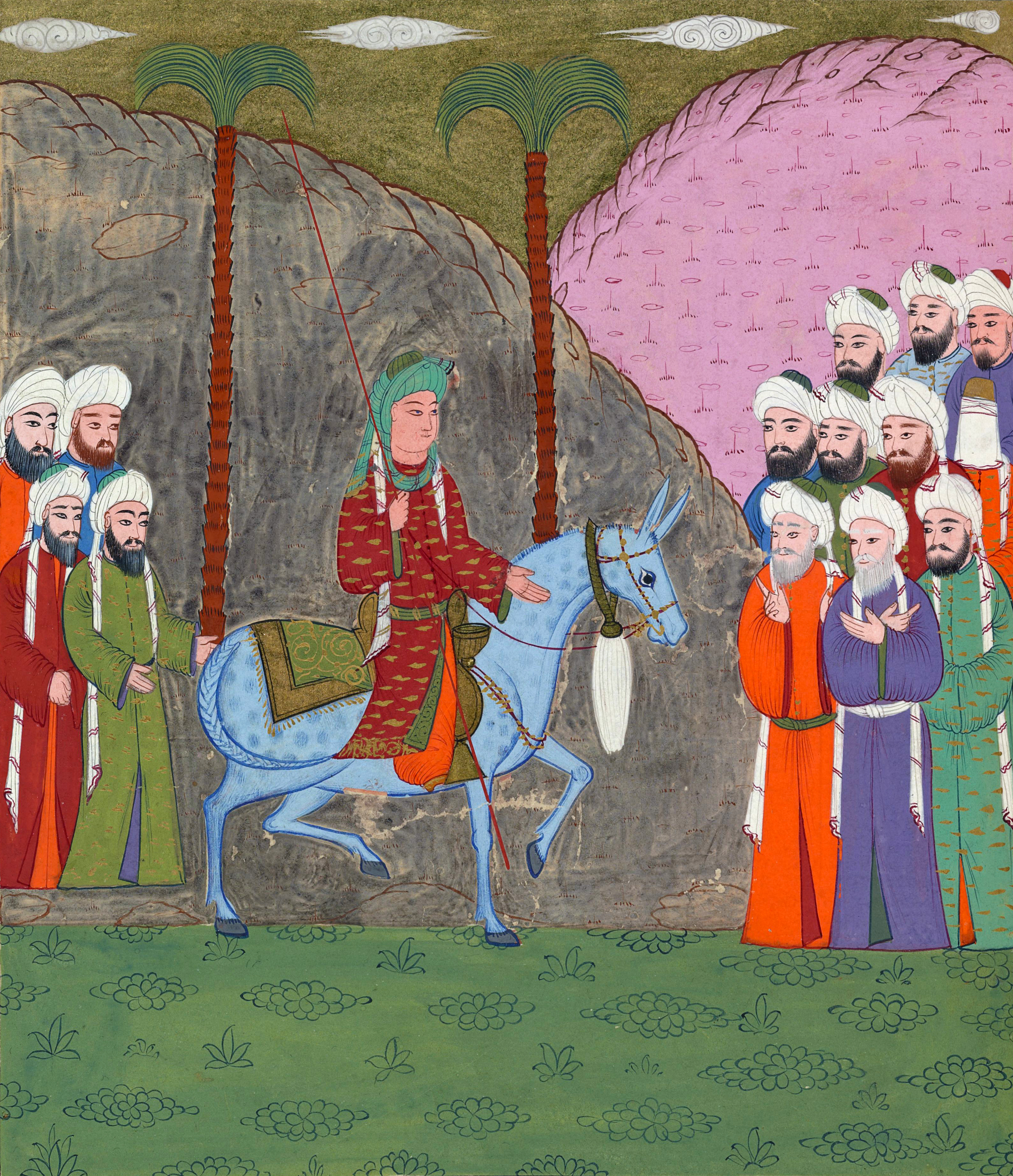
Ali in an illustrated copy of the Turkish epic Siyer-i nebi

Ali was born in tradition to Abu Talib ibn Abd al-Muttalib and his wife Fatima bint Asad around 600 CE, possibly 13 Rajab, which is the occasion celebrated annually by Shia Muslims. Ali may have been also the only person born inside the Ka'ba, the holiest site of Islam, which is located in Mecca. Ali's father was a leading member of the Banu Hashim, a clan within the Meccan tribe of Quraysh. According to tradition, Abu Talib raised his nephew Muhammad, whose parents had died, and later, when Abu Talib fell into poverty, Muhammad became wealthy by marrying Khadija, a rich woman. Therefore, Ali came under the guardianship of Muhammad and his wife Khadija when Ali was about five years old.

Aged about eleven, Ali was among the first to accept Muhammad's teachings and profess Islam. Ali did so either after Khadija or after Khadija and Muhammad's successor, Abu Bakr. While the precise order here is debated among Shia and Sunni scholars, the earliest sources place Ali before Abu Bakr. Muhammad's call to Islam in Mecca lasted from 610 to 622, during which Ali assiduously supported the small Muslim community, especially the poor. Some three years after his first revelation, Muhammad gathered his relatives for a feast, invited them to Islam, and asked for their assistance. Aged about fourteen, Ali was the only relative there who offered his support, after which Muhammad told his guests that Ali was his brother and his successor, according to the Sunni historian al-Tabari (d. 923). The Shia interpretation of this episode is that Muhammad had already designated Ali as his successor.

== Companionship of Muhammad ==
When tipped off about an assassination plot in 622, Muhammad escaped to Yathrib, now known as Medina, but Ali stayed behind as his decoy. The fact that Ali risked his life for Muhammad is said to be the reason for the revelation of the Quranic passage, "But there is also a kind of man who gives his life away to please God." This emigration marks the beginning of the Islamic calendar (AH). Ali also escaped Mecca after returning the goods that had been entrusted to Muhammad there. Later in Medina, Muhammad selected Ali as his brother when he paired Muslims for fraternity pacts. Around 623–625, Muhammad gave his daughter Fatima to Ali in marriage, aged about twenty-two at the time. Muhammad had earlier turned down marriage proposals for Fatima by some of his companions, notably, Abu Bakr and Umar.

=== Event of the mubahala ===
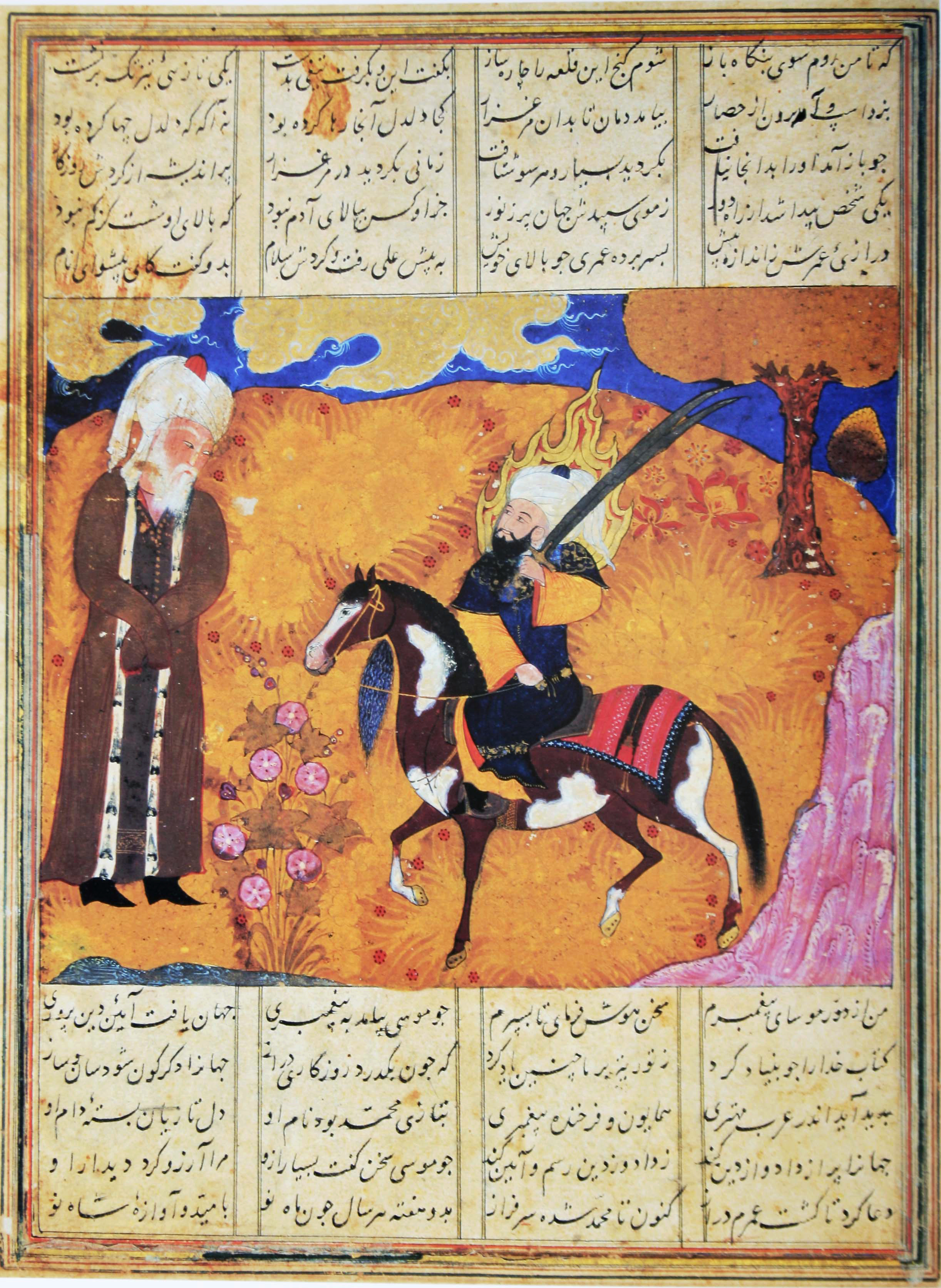
Muhammad and Ali (with his sword Zulfiqar in hand), a folio from the 15th century Iranian epic Khavarannama

A Christian envoy from Najran, located in South Arabia, arrived in Medina circa 632 and negotiated a peace treaty with Muhammad. The envoy also debated with Muhammad the nature of Jesus, human or divine. Linked to this episode is verse 3:61 of the Quran, which instructs Muhammad to challenge his opponents to mubahala (lit. 'mutual cursing'), perhaps when their debate had reached a deadlock. Even though the delegation ultimately withdrew from the challenge, Muhammad appeared for the occasion of mubahala, accompanied by Ali, his wife Fatima, and their two sons, Hasan and Husayn. The inclusion of these four by Muhammad in the mubahala ritual, as his witnesses and guarantors, likely raised their religious rank within the community. If the word 'ourselves' in the verse is a reference to Ali and Muhammad, as Shia authors argue, then the former naturally enjoys a similar religious authority in the Quran as the latter.

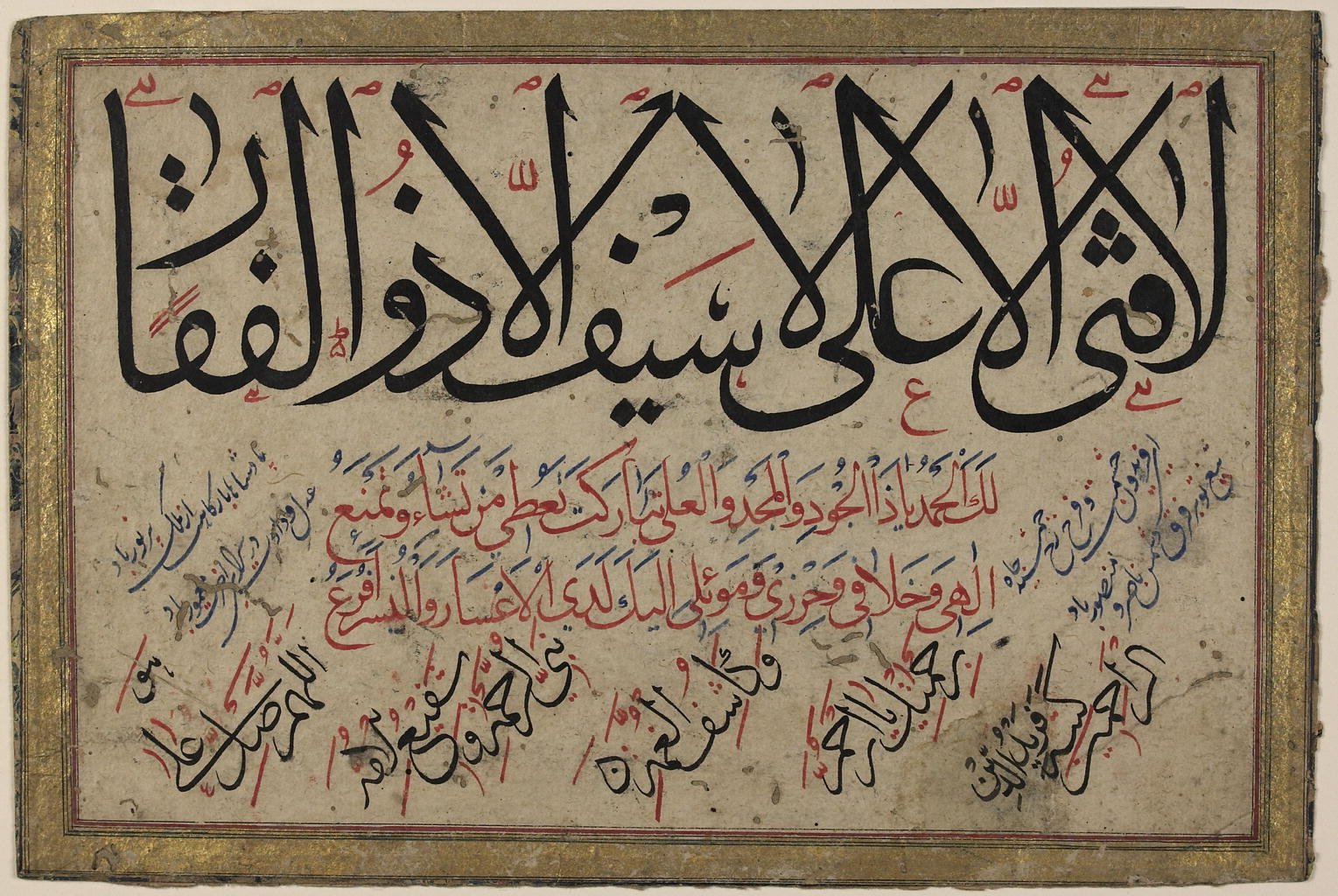
Muhammad's saying: "There is no sword but Zulfiqar, and there is no hero but Ali."

=== Political career ===
In Medina, Ali acted as Muhammad's secretary and deputy. He was also one of the scribes tasked with committing the Quran to writing. In 628, Ali wrote down the terms of the Treaty of al-Hudaybiya, the peace treaty between Muslims and Meccan pagans. In 630, divine orders pushed Muhammad to replace Abu Bakr with Ali for a key Quranic announcement in Mecca, according to the canonical Sunni source Sunan al-Nasa'i. Ali also helped ensure that the Conquest of Mecca in 630 was bloodless and later destroyed the idols housed in Ka'ba. In 631, Ali was sent to preach Islam in Yemen, as a consequence of which the Hamdanids peacefully converted. Ali also peacefully resolved a blood feud between Muslims and the Banu Jadhima.

=== Military career ===
Ali accompanied Muhammad in all of his military missions except the Expedition of Tabuk in 630, during which Ali was left behind in charge of Medina. The hadith of the position is linked to this occasion, "Are you not content, Ali, to stand to me as Aaron stood to Moses, except that there will be no prophet after me?" This statement appears in the canonical Sunni sources Sahih al-Bukhari and Sahih Muslim, among others. For the Shia, this hadith signifies Ali's usurped right to succeed Muhammad. In the absence of Muhammad, Ali commanded the expedition to Fadak in 628.

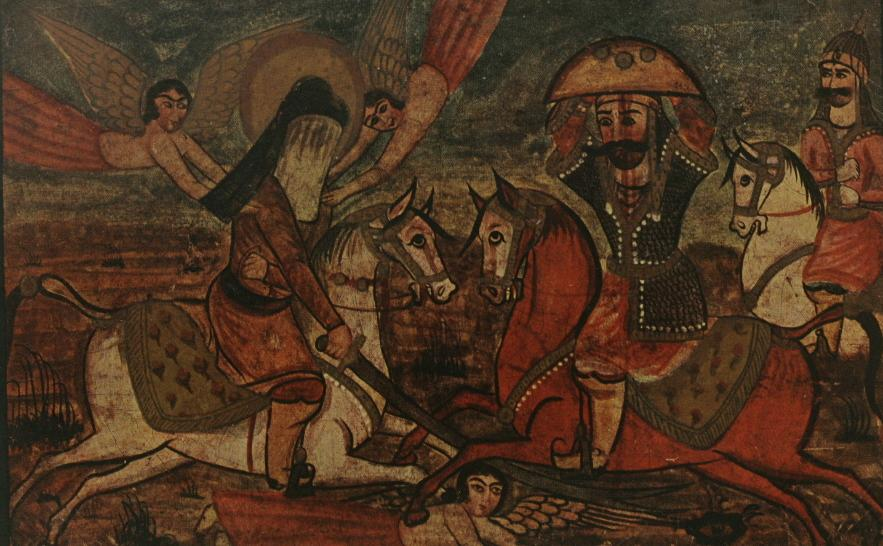
Ali in the Battle of Khaybar, slaying the Jewish Knight Marhab.

Ali was renowned for his bravery on the battlefield, and for his magnanimity towards his defeated enemies. He was the standard-bearer in the Battle of Badr (624) and the Battle of Khaybar (628). He vigorously defended Muhammad in the Battle of Uhud (625) and the Battle of Hunayn (630), and Muslims' victory in the Battle of Khaybar has been attributed to his courage, where he is said to have torn off the iron gate of the enemy fort. Ali also defeated the pagan champion Amr ibn Abd al-Wud in the Battle of the Trench in 627. According to al-Tabari, Muhammad reported hearing a divine voice at Uhud, "[There is] no sword but Zulfiqar [Ali's sword], [there is] no chivalrous youth (fata) but Ali." Ali and his cousin, the companion Zubayr ibn al-Awwam, apparently oversaw the killing of the Banu Qurayza men for treachery in 626–627, though the historicity of this account has been doubted.

=== Ghadir Khumm ===
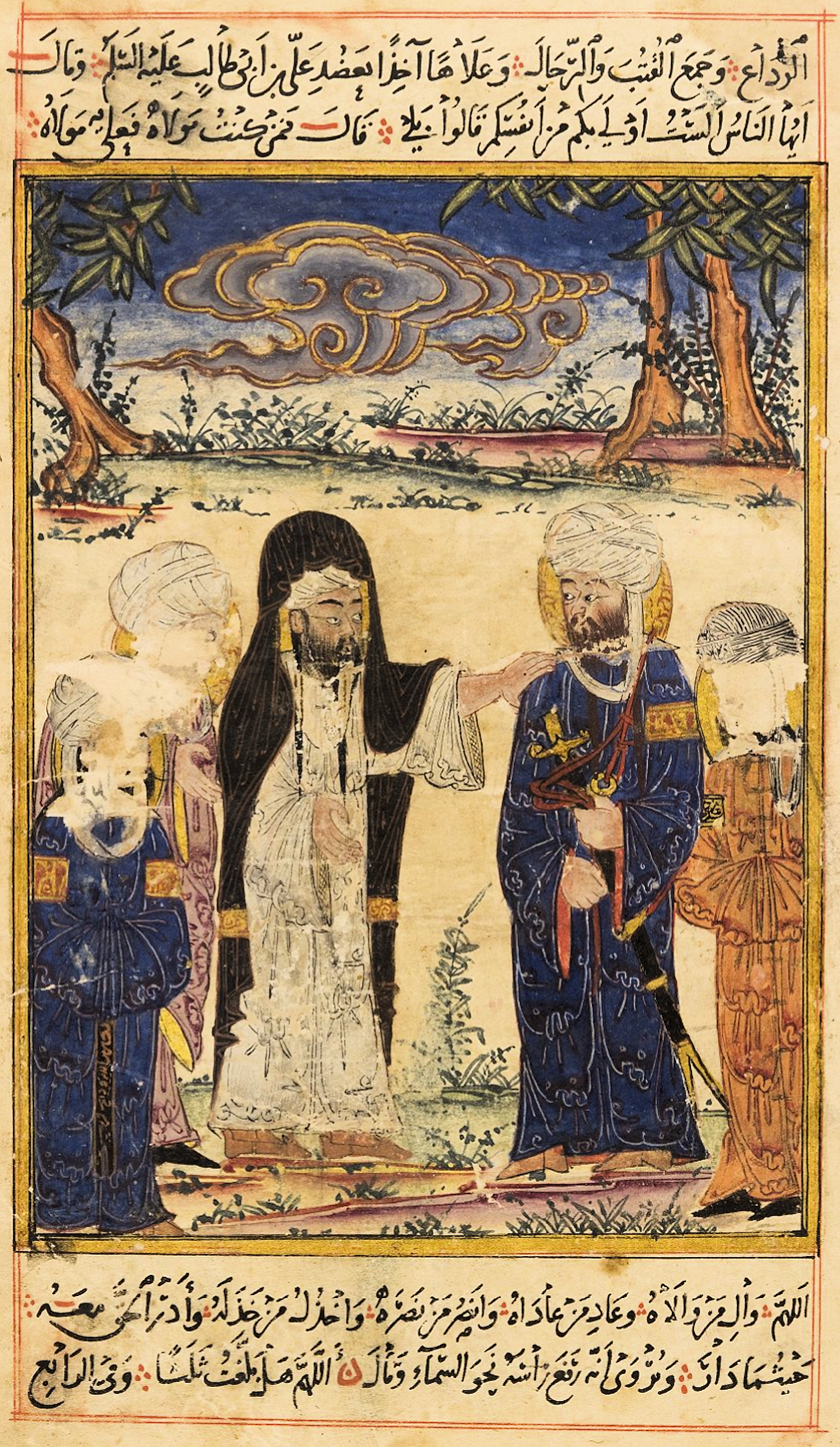
The Investiture of Ali by Muhammad at the Ghadir Khumm, 1307 AD Ilkhanid manuscript illustration.

On his return trip from the Hajj pilgrimage in 632, Muhammad halted the large caravan of pilgrims at the Ghadir Khumm and addressed them after the congregational prayer. After the prayer, Muhammad delivered a sermon to a large number of Muslims in which he emphasized the importance of the Quran and his ahl al-bayt (lit. 'people of the house', his family). Taking Ali by the hand, Muhammad then asked if he was not awla (lit. 'have more authority over' or 'closer to') the believers than themselves, this is evidently a reference to verse 33:6 of the Quran. When they affirmed, Muhammad then declared, "He whose mawla I am, Ali is his mawla." Musnad Ibn Hanbal, a canonical Sunni source, adds that Muhammad repeated this statement three or four more times and that Umar congratulated Ali after the sermon, "You have now become the mawla of every faithful man and woman." Muhammad had earlier alerted Muslims about his impending death. Shia sources describe the event in greater detail, linking the announcement to verses 5:3 and 5:67 of the Quran.

The authenticity of the Ghadir Khumm is rarely contested, as it is "among the most extensively acknowledged and substantiated" reports in classical Islamic sources. However, mawla is a polysemous Arabic word and its interpretation in the context of the Ghadir Khumm is split along sectarian lines. Shia sources interpret mawla as 'leader', 'master', and 'patron', while Sunni sources interpret it as love or support for Ali. Shias, therefore, view the Ghadir Khumm as the investiture of Ali with Muhammad's religious and political authority, while Sunnis regard it as a statement about the rapport between the two men, or that Ali should execute Muhammad's will. Shias point to the extraordinary nature of the announcement, give Quranic and textual evidence, and argue to eliminate other meanings of mawla in the hadith except for authority, while Sunnis minimize the importance of the Ghadir Khumm by casting it as a simple response to earlier complaints about Ali. During his caliphate, Ali is known to have asked Muslims to come forward with their testimonies about the Ghadir Khumm, presumably to counter challenges to his legitimacy.

== Life under Rashidun Caliphs ==
=== Succession to Muhammad ===
Ambigram depicting Muhammad (right) and Ali (left) written in a single word. The 180-degree inverted form shows both words.

==== Saqifa ====
Muhammad died in 632 when Ali was in his early thirties. As he and other close relatives prepared for the burial, a group of the Ansar (Medinan natives, lit. 'helpers') gathered at the Saqifa to discuss the future of Muslims or to retake control of their city, Medina. Abu Bakr and Umar were among the few representatives of the Muhajirun (Meccan converts, lit. 'migrants') at the Saqifa. The case of Ali was unsuccessfully brought up at the Saqifa in his absence, and, ultimately, those present there appointed Abu Bakr to leadership after a heated debate that is said to have become violent. Clan rivalries at the Saqifa played a key role in favor of Abu Bakr, and the outcome may have been different in a broad council (shura) with Ali as a candidate. In particular, the Quraysh tradition of hereditary succession strongly favored Ali, even though his youth weakened his case. By contrast, the succession (caliphate) of Abu Bakr is often justified on the basis that he led some of the prayers in Muhammad's final days, but the veracity and political significance of such reports have been questioned.

===== Attack on Fatima's house =====
While the appointment of Abu Bakr was met with little resistance in Medina, the Banu Hashim and some companions of Muhammad soon gathered in protest at Ali's house. Among them were Zubayr and Muhammad's uncle Abbas. These protestors held Ali to be the rightful successor to Muhammad, probably in reference to the Ghadir Khumm. Among others, al-Tabari reports that Umar then led an armed mob to Ali's residence and threatened to set the house on fire if Ali and his supporters did not pledge their allegiance to Abu Bakr. The scene soon grew violent, but the mob retreated after Ali's wife, Fatima, pleaded with them. Abu Bakr later placed a successful boycott on the Banu Hashim, who eventually abandoned their support for Ali. Most likely, Ali himself did not pledge his allegiance to Abu Bakr until Fatima died within six months of her father, Muhammad. In Shia sources, the death (and miscarriage) of the young Fatima are attributed to an attack on her house to subdue Ali by the order of Abu Bakr. Sunnis categorically reject these reports, but there is evidence in their early sources that a mob entered Fatima's house by force and arrested Ali, an incident that Abu Bakr regretted on his deathbed. Likely a political move to weaken the Banu Hashim, Abu Bakr had earlier confiscated from Fatima the rich lands of Fadak, which she considered her inheritance (or a gift) from her father. The confiscation of Fadak is often justified in Sunni sources with a hadith about prophetic inheritance, the authenticity of which has been doubted partly because it contradicts Quranic injunctions.

=== Caliphate of Abu Bakr (r. 632–634) ===
In the absence of popular support, Ali eventually accepted the temporal rule of Abu Bakr, probably for the sake of Muslim unity. In particular, Ali turned down proposals to forcefully pursue the caliphate. He nevertheless viewed himself as the most qualified candidate for leadership by virtue of his merits and his kinship with Muhammad. Evidence suggests that Ali further considered himself as the designated successor of Muhammad. While Ali had been deeply involved in public and military life during Muhammad's lifetime, he retired from public life during the caliphates of Abu Bakr and his successors, Umar and Uthman. Ali did not participate in the Ridda Wars and the early Muslim conquests, though he remained an advisor to Abu Bakr and Umar on government and religious matters., However, their conflicts with Ali is also well-documented, but largely ignored in Sunni sources. These tensions were epitomized during the proceedings of the electoral council in 644 when Ali refused to be bound by the precedence of the first two caliphs. In contrast, Shia sources view Ali's pledge to Abu Bakr as a (coerced) act of political expediency (taqiya). The conflicts with Ali are probably magnified in Shia sources.

=== Caliphate of Umar (r. 634–644) ===
Before his death in 634, Abu Bakr designated Umar as his successor. Ali was not consulted about this appointment, which was initially resisted by some senior companions. Ali himself did not press any claims this time and kept aloof from public affairs during the caliphate of Umar, who nevertheless consulted Ali in certain matters. For instance, Ali is credited with the idea of adopting the migration to Medina (hijra) as the beginning of the Islamic calendar. Yet Ali's political advice was probably ignored. For example, Umar devised a state register (diwan) to distribute excess state revenues according to Islamic precedence, but Ali held that those revenues should be equally distributed among Muslims, following the practice of Muhammad and Abu Bakr. Ali was also absent from the strategic meeting of notables near Damascus. Ali did not participate in Umar's military expeditions, although he does not seem to have publicly objected to them. Umar likely opposed the combination of prophethood and caliphate in the Banu Hashim, and he prevented Muhammad from dictating his will on his deathbed, possibly fearing that he might expressly designate Ali as his successor. Nevertheless, perhaps realizing the necessity of Ali's cooperation in his collaborative scheme of governance, Umar made some limited overtures to Ali and the Banu Hashim during his caliphate. For instance, Umar returned Muhammad's estates in Medina to Ali, but kept Fadak and Khaybar. By some accounts, Umar also insisted on marrying Ali's daughter Umm Kulthum, to which Ali reluctantly agreed when the former enlisted public support for his demand.

==== Election of Uthman (644) ====
Before his death in 644, Umar tasked a small committee with choosing the next caliph among themselves. Ali and Uthman were the strongest candidates in this committee, whose members were all early companions of Muhammad from the Quraysh tribe. Another member, Abd al-Rahman ibn Awf, was given the deciding vote either by the committee or by Umar. After deliberations, Ibn Awf appointed his brother-in-law Uthman as the next caliph, when the latter promised to follow the precedent of the first two caliphs. By contrast, Ali rejected this condition, or gave an evasive answer. The Ansar were not represented in the committee, which was evidently biased toward Uthman. Both of these factors worked against Ali, who could not have been simply excluded from the proceedings.

=== Caliphate of Uthman (r. 644–656) ===
Uthman was widely accused of nepotism, corruption, and injustice. Ali too criticized Uthman's conduct, including his lavish gifts for his kinsmen. Ali also protected outspoken companions, such as Abu Dharr and Ammar, and overall acted as a restraining influence on Uthman. Some supporters of Ali were part of the opposition movement, joined in their efforts by Talha and Zubayr, both senior companions of Muhammad, and by his widow Aisha. Among such supporters of Ali were Malik al-Ashtar and other religiously learned qurra (lit. 'Quran readers'). These supporters wanted to see Ali as the next caliph but there is no evidence that he coordinated with them. Ali also rejected the requests to lead the rebels, although he probably sympathized with their grievances. He was therefore considered a natural focus for the opposition, at least morally.

==== Assassination of Uthman (656) ====
As their grievances mounted, provincial dissidents poured into Medina in 656. The Egyptian opposition sought the advice of Ali, who urged them to negotiate with Uthman. Ali similarly asked the Iraqi opposition to refrain from violence, which they heeded. He also repeatedly mediated between Uthman and the dissidents, to address their economic and political grievances. In particular, Ali negotiated and guaranteed the agreement that ended the first siege. He then convinced Uthman to publicly repent, which the caliph did but then retracted his statement, possibly influenced by his secretary Marwan ibn al-Hakam. Egyptian rebels laid siege to Uthman's residence for a second time when they intercepted an official letter ordering their punishment. They demanded the caliph's abdication but he refused and maintained his innocence about the letter, for which Marwan is often blamed in the early sources. Ali also sided with Uthman, but the caliph apparently accused him about the letter. This is probably when Ali refused to further intercede for Uthman, who was assassinated soon after by Egyptian rebels. Ali played no role in the deadly attack, and his son Hasan was injured while guarding Uthman's besieged residence at Ali's behest. He also convinced the rebels to deliver water to Uthman's house during the siege.

== Caliphate ==
=== Election (656) ===
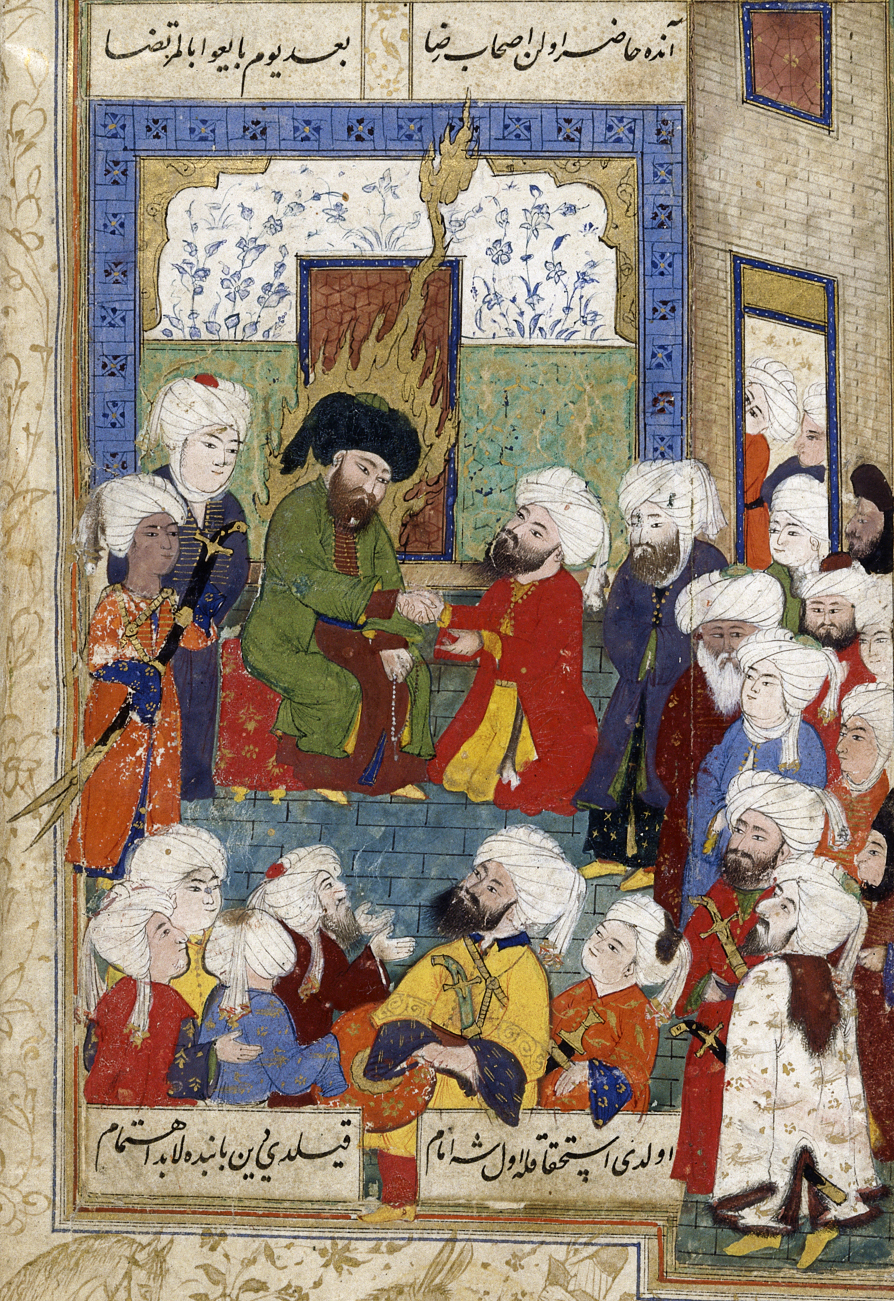
Ali receiving pledges of allegiance, from a manuscript of Maktel-i Ali resul, dated to late 16th century.

When Uthman was assassinated in 656 by Egyptian rebels, the potential candidates for caliphate were Ali and Talha. The Umayyads had fled Medina, leaving the provincial rebels and the Ansar in control of the city. Among the Egyptians, Talha enjoyed some support, but the Iraqis and most of the Ansar supported Ali. The majority of the Muhajirun, and key tribal figures also favored Ali at this time. The caliphate was offered by these groups to Ali, who, after some hesitation, publicly took the oath of office. Malik al-Ashtar might have been the first to pledge his allegiance to Ali. Talha and Zubayr, who both aspired to the caliphate, also gave their pledges to Ali, most likely willingly, but later broke their oaths. Ali probably did not force anyone to pledge, and there is little evidence of any violence, even though many broke with Ali later, claiming that they had pledged under duress. At the same time, the supporters, who were in the majority in Medina, might have intimidated others.

==== Legitimacy ====
Ali thus filled the power vacuum created by the regicide. His election, irregular and without a council, faced little public opposition in Medina, but the rebels' support for him left him exposed to accusations of complicity in Uthman's assassination. Even though underprivileged groups readily rallied around Ali, he had limited support among the powerful Quraysh, some of whom aspired to caliphate. Within the Quraysh, two camps opposed Ali: the Umayyads, who believed that the caliphate was their right after Uthman, and those who wished to restore the caliphate of Quraysh on the same principles laid by Abu Bakr and Umar. This second group was likely the majority within the Quraysh. Ali was indeed vocal about the divine prerogative of Muhammad's kin to leadership, which would have jeopardized the political ambitions of the rest of the Quraysh.

=== Administrative policies ===
==== Justice ====
The caliphate of Ali was characterized by his strict justice. He implemented radical policies to restore his vision of prophetic governance, and dismissed nearly all of Uthman's governors, whom he considered corrupt. Ali also distributed the treasury funds equally among Muslims, following the practice of Muhammad, and is said to have shown zero tolerance for corruption. Some of those affected by Ali's egalitarian policies soon revolted against him under the pretext of revenge for Uthman. Among them was Mu'awiya, the long-time governor of Syria. Ali has therefore been criticized by some for political naivety and excessive rigorism, and praised by others for righteousness and lack of political expediency. His supporters identify similar decisions of Muhammad, and argue that Islam never allows for compromising on a just cause, citing verse 68:9 of the Quran, "They wish that thou might compromise and that they might compromise." Some instead suggest that Ali's decisions were actually justified on a practical level. For instance, the removal of unpopular governors was perhaps the only option available to Ali because injustice was the main grievance of the rebels.

==== Religious authority ====
As evident from his public speeches, Ali viewed himself not only as the temporal leader of the Muslim community but also as its exclusive religious authority. He thus laid claim to the religious authority to interpret the Quran and Sunnah. Some supporters of Ali indeed held him as their divinely-guided leader who deserved the same type of loyalty that Muhammad did. They felt an absolute and all-encompassing bond of spiritual loyalty (walaya) to Ali that transcended politics. For instance, many of them publicly offered Ali their unconditional support circa 658. They justified their absolute loyalty to Ali based on his merits, precedent in Islam, his kinship with Muhammad, and also the announcement by the latter at the Ghadir Khumm. Many of these supporters also viewed Ali as the rightful successor to Muhammad after his death, as evidenced in the poetry from that period, for instance.

==== Fiscal policies ====
Ali opposed centralized control over provincial revenues. He equally distributed excess taxes and booty among Muslims, following the precedent of Muhammad and Abu Bakr. In comparison, Umar had distributed the state revenues according to Islamic merit, and Uthman was widely accused of nepotism and corruption. The strictly egalitarian policies of Ali earned him the support of underprivileged groups, including the Ansar, the qurra, and the late immigrants to Iraq. By contrast, Talha and Zubayr were both Qurayshite companions of Muhammad who had amassed immense wealth under Uthman. They both revolted against Ali when he refused to grant them favors. Some other figures among the Quraysh similarly turned against Ali, who even withheld public funds from his relatives, whereas his archenemy Mu'awiya readily offered monetary gifts. Ali instructed his officials to collect tax payments on a voluntary basis and without harassment, and to prioritize the poor when distributing public funds. A letter attributed to Ali directs his governor to pay more attention to land development than taxation.

==== Rules of war ====
During the civil war, Ali forbade his soldiers from looting, and instead paid them from the tax revenues. He also pardoned his enemies in victory. Both of these practices were later enshrined in Islamic law. Ali also advised his commander al-Ashtar not to reject any calls to peace, not to violate any agreements, and ordered him not to commence hostilities. Ali similarly barred his troops from disturbing civilians, killing the wounded and those who fled, mutilating the dead, entering homes without permission, looting, and harming women. He prevented the enslavement of women in victory, even though some protested. Before the Battle of Siffin, Ali did not retaliate and allowed his enemies to access drinking water when he gained the upper hand.

=== Battle of the Camel ===
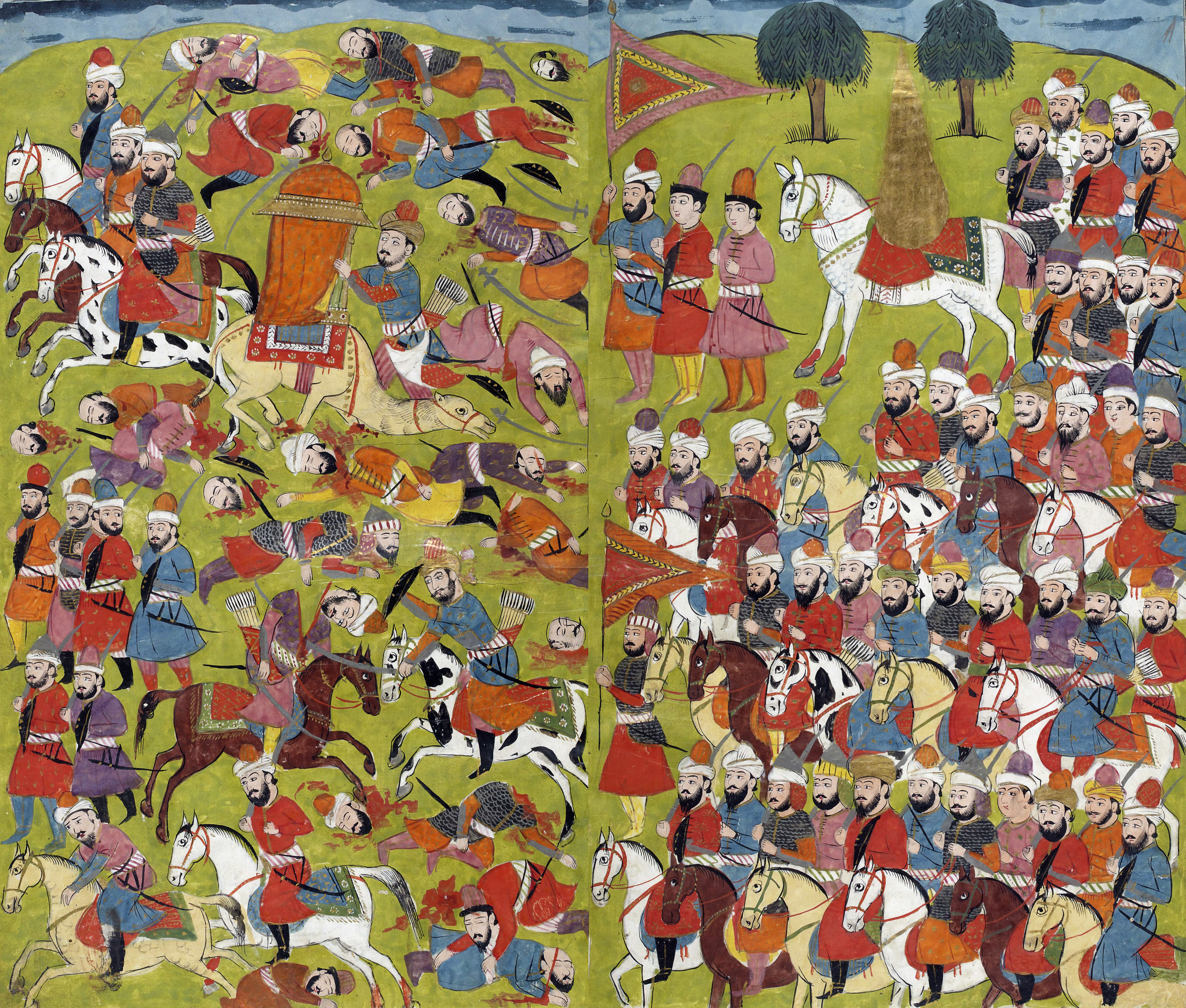
Miniature depicting Ali (depicted as a golden flame) defeating Aisha and taking her captive during the Battle of the Camel

Aisha publicly campaigned against Ali immediately after his accession. She was joined in Mecca by her close relatives, Talha and Zubayr, who thus broke their earlier oaths of allegiance to Ali. This opposition demanded the punishment of Uthman's assassins, and accused Ali of complicity in the assassination. They also called for the removal of Ali from office and for a Qurayshite council to appoint his successor. Their primary goal was likely the removal of Ali, rather than vengeance for Uthman, against whom the triumvirate had stirred up public opinion. The opposition failed to gain enough traction in Hejaz, and instead captured Basra in Iraq, killing many there. Ali raised an army from nearby Kufa, which formed the core of Ali's forces in the coming battles. The two armies soon camped just outside of Basra, both probably numbered around ten thousand men. After three days of failed negotiations, the two sides readied for battle.

==== Account of the battle ====
The battle took place in December 656. The rebels commenced hostilities, and Aisha was present on the battlefield, riding in an armored palanquin atop a red camel, after which the battle is named. Talha was soon killed by another rebel, Marwan, the secretary of Uthman. Zubayr, an experienced fighter, deserted shortly after the battle had begun, but was pursued and killed. His desertion suggests he had serious moral misgivings about their cause. Ali won the day, and Aisha was respectfully escorted back to Hejaz. Ali then announced a public pardon, setting free all war prisoners, including Marwan, and prohibiting the enslavement of their women. Their seized properties were also returned. Ali then stationed himself in Kufa, which thus became his de facto capital.

=== Battle of Siffin ===
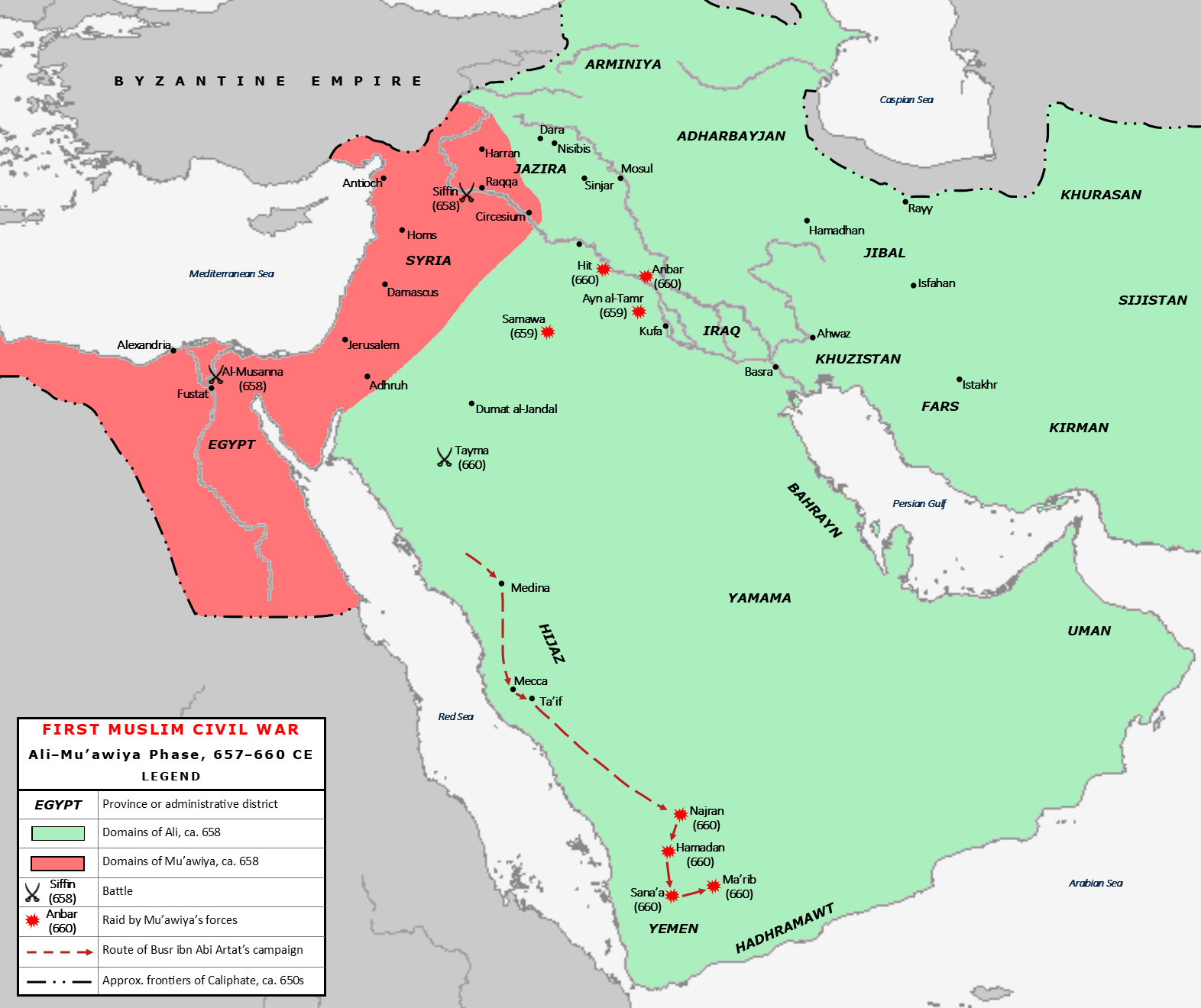
Map of the First Fitna; green territory under Ali's control; pink territory under Mu'awiya's control.

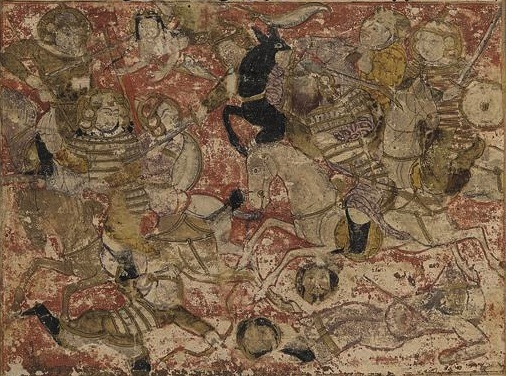
Combat between the forces of Ali and Mu'awiya during the Battle of Siffin, from the Tarikhnama, early 14th century.

Mu'awiya, the incumbent governor of Syria, was deemed corrupt and unfit by Ali, who removed him from his post. In turn, Mu'awiya refused to step down and informed Ali through a representative that he would recognize Ali as caliph in exchange for the continued governorship of Syria, and possibly the annexation of Egypt. Ali rejected this proposal.

In response, Mu'awiya launched a propaganda campaign across Syria, blaming Ali for the regicide and calling for revenge. Mu'awiya also joined forces with Amr ibn al-As, a military strategist, who pledged to back the Umayyads against Ali in return for the life-long governorship of Egypt. Mu'awiya then formally declared war, charging Ali with complicity in the regicide, demanding his removal, and a council in Syria thereafter to elect the next caliph. Contemporary authors tend to view Mu'awiya's call for revenge as a pretext to retain power.

==== Account of the battle ====
In the summer of 657, Ali's Iraqi army and Mu'awiya's Syrian forces camped at Siffin, west of the Euphrates River, numbering perhaps at 100,000 and 130,000, respectively. Many of Muhammad's companions were present in Ali's army, whereas Mu'awiya could only boast a handful. The two sides negotiated for a while, to no avail, after which the main battle took place from Wednesday, 26 July 657, until Friday or Saturday morning. Ali probably refrained from initiating hostilities, and later fought alongside his men on the frontline, whereas Mu'awiya led from his pavilion, and rejected a proposal to settle the matters in a personal duel with Ali. Among those killed fighting for Ali was Ammar ibn Yasir. In canonical Sunni sources, a prophetic hadith predicts Ammar's death at the hands of al-fi'a al-baghiya (lit. 'rebellious aggressive group').

==== Call to arbitration ====
Fighting stopped when some Syrians raised pages of the Quran on their lances, shouting, "Let the Book of God be the judge between us." Since Mu'awiya had for long insisted on battle, this call for arbitration suggests that he now sensed defeat. By contrast, Ali exhorted his men to fight, telling them that raising Qurans was for deception, but to no avail. Through their representatives, the qurra and the ridda tribesmen of Kufa, the largest bloc in Ali's army, both threatened Ali with mutiny if he did not answer the Syrians' call. Facing strong peace sentiments in his army, Ali accepted the arbitration proposal, most likely against his own judgment.

==== Arbitration agreement ====
Mu'awiya now proposed that representatives from both sides should find a Quranic resolution. Mu'awiya was represented by his ally Amr, whereas, despite Ali's opposition, the majority in his camp pressed for the neutral Abu Musa, the erstwhile governor of Kufa. The arbitration agreement was written and signed on 2 August 657, stipulating that the two representatives should meet on neutral territory, adhere to the Quran and Sunnah, and restore peace. Both armies left the battlefield after the agreement. The arbitration agreement thus divided Ali's camp, as many did not support his negotiations with Mu'awiya, whose claims they considered fraudulent. By contrast, the agreement strengthened Mu'awiya's position, who was now an equal contender for the caliphate.

==== Formation of the Kharijites ====
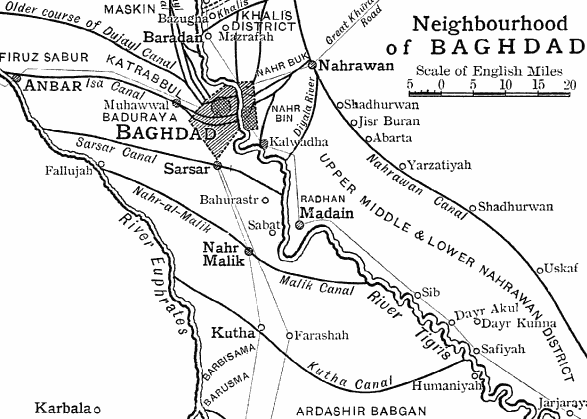
The Nahrawan Canal ran parallel to the east bank of the Tigris

Some of Ali's men left him in protest to the arbitration agreement. Many of them eventually rejoined Ali, while the rest gathered in the town of al-Nahrawan. They became known as the Kharijites (lit. 'seceders'), who later took up arms against Ali in the Battle of Nahrawan. The Kharijites, many of whom belonged to the qurra, were likely disillusioned with the arbitration process. Their slogan was, "No judgment but that of God," highlighting their rejection of arbitration (by men) in reference to the Quranic verse 49:9. Ali called this slogan a word of truth by which the seceders sought falsehood because he viewed the ruler as indispensable in the conduct of religion.

==== Arbitration proceedings ====
The two arbitrators met together in Dumat al-Jandal, perhaps in February 658. There they reached the verdict that Uthman had been killed wrongfully and that Mu'awiya had the right to seek revenge. They could not agree on anything else. Rather than a judicial ruling, this was a political concession by Abu Musa, who probably hoped that Amr would later reciprocate this gesture. Ali denounced the conduct of the two arbitrators as contrary to the Quran and began organizing a second Syria campaign. Solely an initiative of Mu'awiya, there was also a second meeting in Udhruh. The negotiations there also failed, as the two arbitrators could not agree on the next caliph: Amr supported Mu'awiya, while Abu Musa nominated his son-in-law Abd Allah ibn Umar, who stood down. At its closure, Abu Musa publicly deposed both Mu'awiya and Ali and called for a council to appoint his successor per earlier agreements with Amr. When Amr took the stage, however, he deposed Ali and appointed Mu'awiya as his successor. The Kufan delegation reacted furiously to Abu Musa's concessions, and the common view is that the arbitration failed, or was inconclusive. It nevertheless strengthened the Syrians' support for Mu'awiya and weakened the position of Ali.

=== Battle of Nahrawan ===
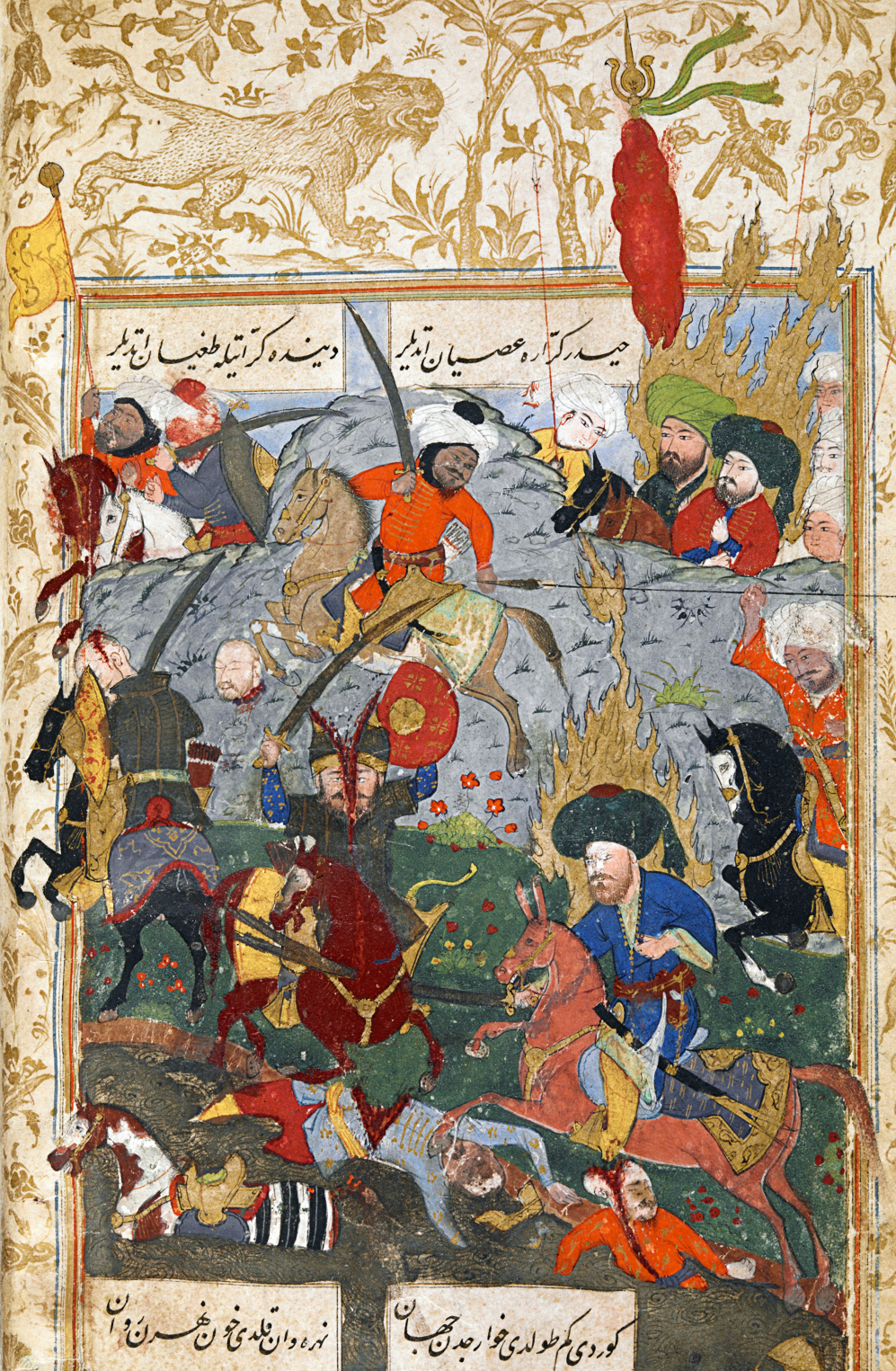
Ali bearing a green turban and Zulfiqar at the Battle of Nahrawan, folio from a manuscript of Maqtel-i Ali resul, late 16th century

After the arbitration, Mu'awiya received the Syrians' pledge as caliph. Ali then organized a new, much smaller, Syrian campaign. But he postponed the expedition, and instead marched to Nahrawan with his army, when he learned that the Kharijites were interrogating and executing civilians. They killed many, apparently not even sparing women. Ali convinced many of the Kharijites to separate from their army, leaving about 1,500–1,800, or 2,800, out of about 4,000 fighters. The rest of the Kharijites then attacked and were crushed by Ali's army of about 14,000 men. The battle took place either on 17 July 658, or in 657. Ali has been criticized by some for killing his erstwhile allies, many of whom were outwardly pious Muslims. For others, subduing the Kharijites was necessary, for they were violent and radicalized rebels who posed a danger to Ali's base in Kufa.

=== Final years ===
Following the Battle of Nahrawan, Ali could not muster enough support for a second Syrian campaign. Perhaps his soldiers were demoralized, or perhaps they were recalled by their tribal leaders, many of whom had been bribed and swayed by Mu'awiya. By contrast, Ali did not grant any financial favors to tribal chiefs as a matter of principle. At any rate, the secession of so many of the qurra and the coolness of the tribal leaders weakened Ali. Ali consequently lost Egypt to Mu'awiya in 658. Mu'awiya also began dispatching military detachments, which targeted civilians along the Euphrates river, near Kufa, and most successfully, in the Hejaz and Yemen. Ali could not mount a timely response to these assaults. He eventually found sufficient support for a renewed military offensive against Syria, set to commence in late winter 661. His success was in part due to the public outrage over Syrian raids. However, plans for a second campaign were abandoned after the assassination of Ali.

== Assassination and burial ==
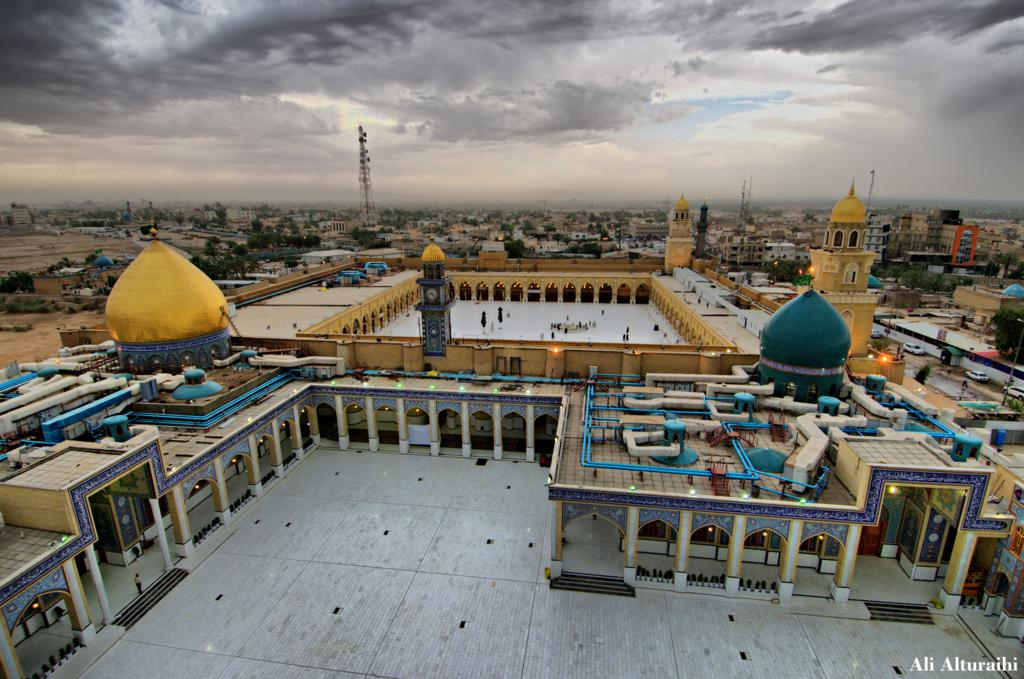
The Great Mosque of Kufa in Kufa, Iraq, is a holy site in Shia Islam. It is where Ali lived and led prayers, and also the site where he was assassinated.

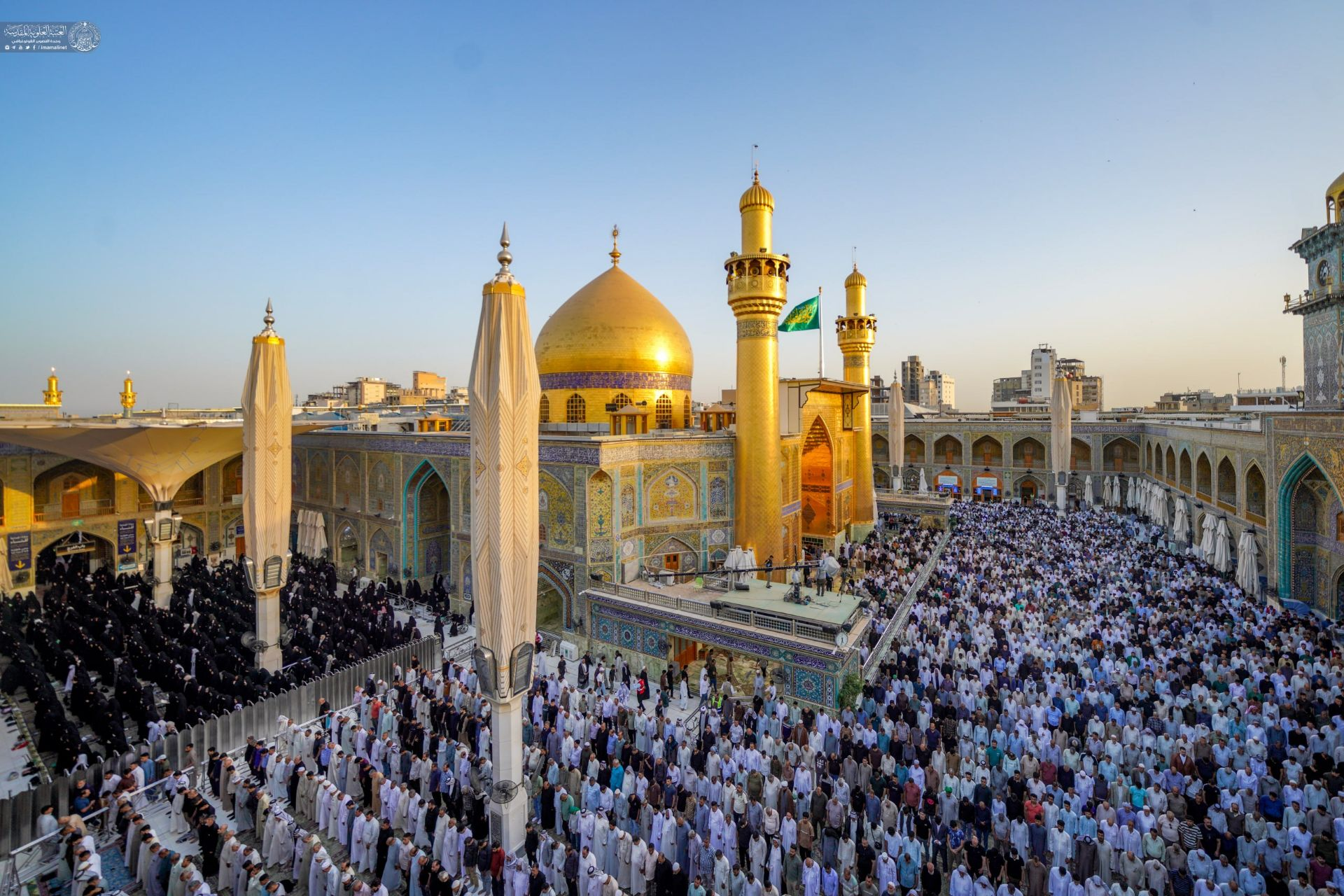
Imam Ali Shrine in Najaf, Iraq, where Ali is buried. It is a profoundly holy site in Shia Islam, considered by Shia Muslims as the holiest site in Islam after Mecca, Medina, and Jerusalem.

Ali was assassinated during the morning prayer on 28 January 661 (19 Ramadan 40 AH) at the Great Mosque of Kufa. The other given dates are 26 and 30 January. He was struck over his head by the Kharijite dissident Abd al-Rahman ibn Muljam with a poison-coated sword, in revenge for their defeat in the Battle of Nahrawan. Ali died from his wounds about two days later, aged sixty-two or sixty-three. By some accounts, he had long known about his fate by premonition or through Muhammad.

Before his death, Ali requested either a meticulous application of the eye for an eye principle to Ibn Muljam or his total pardon. At any rate, Ibn Muljam was later executed by Hasan, the eldest son of Ali.

Fearing that his body might be exhumed and profaned by his enemies, Ali's burial place was kept a secret and remains uncertain. Several sites are mentioned as containing Ali's remains, including the shrine of Ali in Najaf and the shrine of Ali in Mazar. The former site was identified during the reign of the Abbasid caliph Harun al-Rashid (r. 786–809) and the town of Najaf developed around it, which has become a major destination for Shia pilgrimage. The present shrine was built by the Safavid monarch Safi (r. 1629–1642), near which lies an immense cemetery for Shias who wished to be buried next to their imam. Najaf is also home to top religious colleges and prominent Shia scholars. Other sites for Ali's burial are claimed to be Baghdad, Damascus, Medina, Ray while a minority of Shias believe it be somewhere in the city of Kufa.

== Succession ==
When Ali died, his son Hasan was acknowledged as the next caliph in Kufa. As Ali's legatee, Hasan was the obvious choice for the Kufans, especially because Ali was vocal about the exclusive right of Muhammad's kin to leadership. Most surviving companions of Muhammad were in Ali's army, and they also pledged their allegiance to Hasan, but overall the Kufans' support for Hasan was likely weak. Hasan later abdicated in August 661 to Mu'awiya when the latter invaded Iraq with his Syrian army. Mu'awiya thus founded the dynastic Umayyad Caliphate. Throughout his reign, he persecuted the family and supporters of Ali, and authorized the cursing of Ali as part of the communal prayers.

== Descendants of Ali ==
The first marriage of Ali was to Fatima, who bore him three sons, Hasan, Husayn, and Muhsin. Muhsin either died in infancy, or Fatima miscarried him when she was injured in a raid on her house during the succession crisis. The descendants of Hasan and Husayn are known as the Hasanids and the Husaynids, respectively. As the progeny of Muhammad, they are honored in Muslim communities by nobility titles such as sharif and sayyid. Ali and Fatima also had two daughters, Zaynab and Umm Kulthum. After Fatima's death in 632, Ali remarried multiple times and had more children, including Muhammad al-Awsat and Abbas ibn Ali. In his life, Ali fathered seventeen daughters, and eleven, fourteen, or eighteen sons, among whom, Hasan, Husayn, and Muhammad ibn al-Hanafiyya played a historical role. Descendants of Ali are known as the Alids.

=== Under the Umayyads (661–750) ===
Mu'awiya succeeded Ali in 661 and founded the dynastic Umayyad Caliphate, during which Alids were severely persecuted. After Ali, his followers (shi'a) recognized his eldest son Hasan as their imam. When he died in 670, likely poisoned at the instigation of Mu'awiya, the Shia community followed Hasan's younger brother Husayn, who was killed by Umayyad forces in the Battle of Karbala in 680, alongside many of his relatives. To avenge the Karbala massacre, soon followed in 685 the Shia uprising of al-Mukhtar, who claimed to represent Ibn al-Hanafiyya. The main movements that followed this uprising were the now-extinct Kaysanites and the Imamites. The Kaysanites mostly followed Abu Hashim, the son of Ibn al-Hanafiyya. When Abu Hashim died around 716, this group largely aligned itself with the Abbasids, that is, the descendants of Muhammad's uncle Abbas. On the other hand, the Imamites were led by quiescent descendants of Husayn, through his only surviving son, Ali Zayn al-Abidin (d. 713). An exception was Ali's son Zayd, who led a failed uprising against the Umayyads around 740. For his followers, known as the Zaydites, any learned Hasanid or Husaynid who rose against tyranny qualified as imam.

=== Under the Abbasids (750–1258) ===
Alids were also persecuted under the Abbasids, who toppled the Umayyads in 750. Some of the Alids thus revolted, while some established regional dynasties in remote areas. In particular, through imprisonment or surveillance, the Abbasids removed the imams of the Imamites from public life, and they are thought to be responsible for the imams' deaths. Mainstream Imamites were the antecedents of the Twelvers, who believe that their twelfth and final imam, Muhammad al-Mahdi, was born around 868, but was hidden from the public in 874 for fear of persecution. He remains in occultation by divine will until his reappearance at the end of time to eradicate injustice and evil. The only historic split among the Imamites happened when their sixth imam, Ja'far al-Sadiq, died in 765. Some claimed that his designated successor was his son Isma'il, who had predeceased al-Sadiq. These were the antecedents of the Isma'ilites, who found political success at the turn of the tenth century, as the Fatimid Caliphate in Egypt and the Qarmatians in Bahrain.

== Works ==
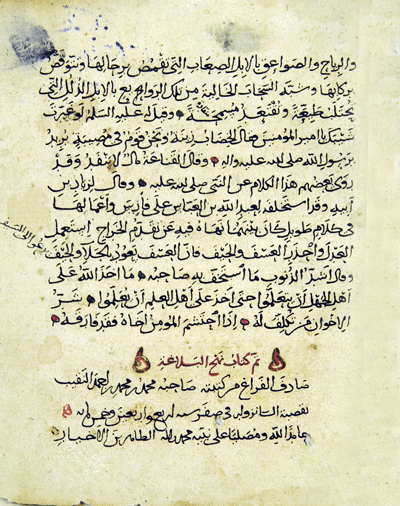
Folio from an old manuscript of Nahj al-balagha, circa 1150 CE

Most of the works attributed to Ali were first delivered as speeches and later committed to writing by others. There are also supplications, such as Du'a Kumayl, which he may have taught others.

=== Nahj al-balagha ===
Nahj al-balagha (lit. 'the path of eloquence') is an eleventh-century collection of sermons, letters, and sayings, all attributed to Ali, compiled by Sharif al-Radi (d. 1015), a prominent Twelver scholar. Because of its sometimes sensitive content, the authenticity of Nahj al-balagha has long been polemically debated. However, by tracking its content in earlier sources, recent academic research has attributed most of Nahj al-balagha to Ali. The book, particularly its letter of instructions addressed at al-Ashtar, has served as an ideological basis for Islamic governance. The book also includes detailed discussions about social responsibilities, emphasizing that greater responsibilities result in greater rights. Nahj al-balagha also contains sensitive material, such as sharp criticism of Ali's predecessors in its Shaqshaqiya sermon, and disapproval of Aisha, Talha, and Zubayr, who had revolted against Ali. Celebrated as an example of the most eloquent Arabic, Nahj al-balagha has significantly influenced the Arabic literature and rhetoric. Numerous commentaries have been written about the book, including the comprehensive work of the Mu'tazilite scholar Ibn Abil-Hadid (d. 1258).

=== Ghurar al-hikam ===
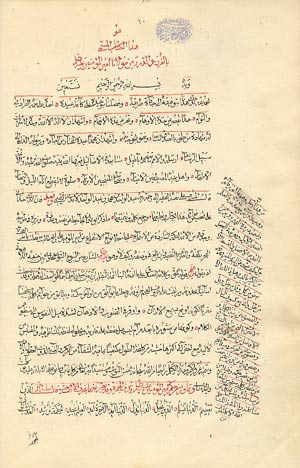
Folio from an old manuscript of Ghurar al-hikam.

Ghurar al-hikam wa durar al-kalim (lit. 'exalted aphorisms and pearls of speech') was compiled by Abd al-Wahid al-Amidi (d. 1116), who was either a Shafi'i jurist or a Twelver scholar. The book contains thousands of short sayings of Ali on piety and ethics. These aphorisms and other works attributed to Ali have considerably influenced the Islamic mysticism.

=== Mushaf of Ali ===
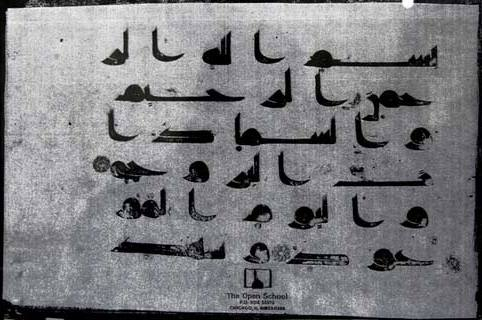
The first three verses of the Surah al-buruj (85:1–3) of the Qura, in what might be a folio from the Mushaf of Ali. Housed in the library of the Imam Ali Shrine.

Mushaf of Ali is a recension of the Quran compiled by Ali, who was one of its first scribes. By some Shia accounts, this codex (mushaf) of Ali was rejected for official use during the succession crisis. Some early Shia traditions also suggest differences with the standard Uthmanid codex, although now the prevalent Shia view is that Ali's recension matches the Uthmanid codex, save for the order of its content. Ali's codex is said to be in the possession of Muhammad al-Mahdi, who would reveal the codex (and its authoritative commentary by Ali) when he reappears.

=== Kitab Ali ===
Kitab Ali (lit. 'book of Ali') is a non-extant collection of prophetic sayings gathered by Ali. The book may have concerned matters of lawfulness (halal) and unlawfulness (haram), including a detailed penal code. Kitab Ali is also often linked to al-Jafr, which is said to contain the esoteric teachings of Muhammad for his household. Copies of Kitab Ali were likely available until the early eighth century, and parts of it have survived in later Shia and Sunni works.

=== Other works ===
The Du'a' Kumayl is a popular Shia supplication attributed to Ali, transmitted by his companion, Kumayl ibn Ziyad. Also attributed to Ali is Kitab al-Diyat on Islamic law, fully quoted in the Shia hadith collection Man la yahduruhu al-faqih. The judicial decisions and executive orders of Ali during his caliphate have also been recorded. Other extant works attributed to Ali are collected in Kitab al-Kafi and other Shia sources.

== Contributions to Islamic sciences ==
The standard recitation of the Quran has been traced back to Ali, and his written legacy is dotted with Quranic commentaries. Ibn Abbas, a leading early exegete, credited Ali with his interpretations of the Quran. Ali also related several hundred prophetic hadiths. He is further credited with the first systematic evaluations of hadiths, and is often considered a founding figure for hadith sciences. Ali is also regarded by some as the founder of Islamic theology, and his sayings contain the first rational proofs of the unity of God (tawhid) in Islam. In later Islamic philosophy, Ali's sayings and sermons were mined for metaphysical knowledge. In particular, Nahj al-balagha is a vital source for Shia philosophical doctrines, after the Quran and Sunnah. As a Shia imam, statements and practices attributed to Ali are widely studied in Shia Islam, where they are viewed as the continuation of prophetic teachings.

== Names and titles ==
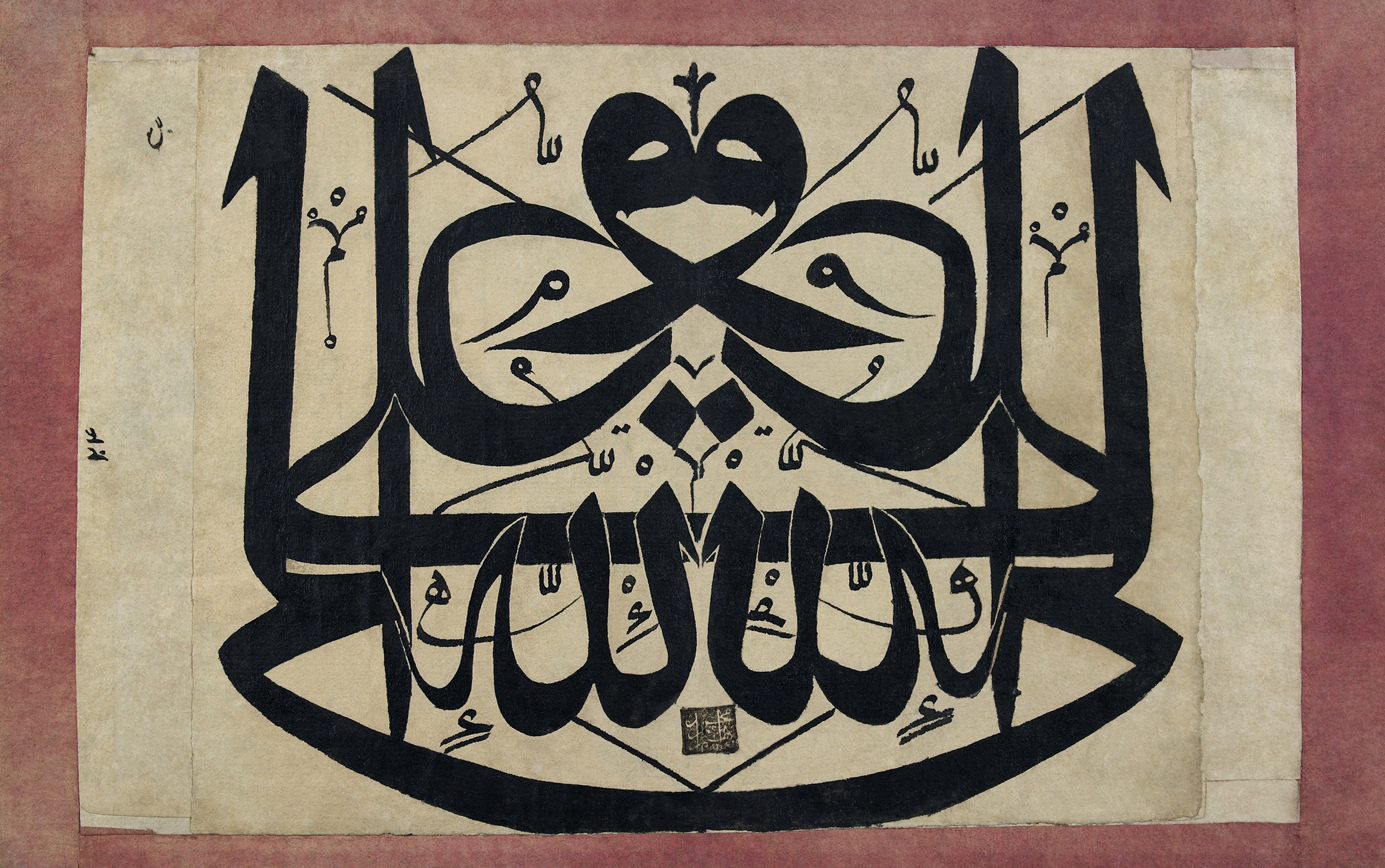
Mirror writing of "Ali is the vicegerent of God" (Ottoman, circa 1720–1730)

Ali is known by many honorifics in the Islamic tradition, some of which are especially used by Shias. His main kunya (teknonym) was ʾAbū al-Ḥasan ("father of al-Hasan"). His titles include al-Murtaḍā (lit. 'one with whom [God] is pleased' or 'one who is chosen and contented'), Asad Allāh (lit. 'lion of God'), Ḥaydar (lit. 'lion', the name initially his mother gave him), Amīr al-Muʾminīn (lit. 'commander of the faithful' or 'prince of the faithful'), and Imām al-Muttaqin (lit. 'leader of the God-fearing'). In particular, Twelvers consider the title of Amir al-Mu'minin to be unique to Ali. He is also referred to as Abū Turāb (lit. 'father of dust'), which might have initially been a pejorative by his enemies. Siddiq al-Akbar and al-Farooq (the one who distinguishes right from wrong) are other titles of Ali.

== Character ==
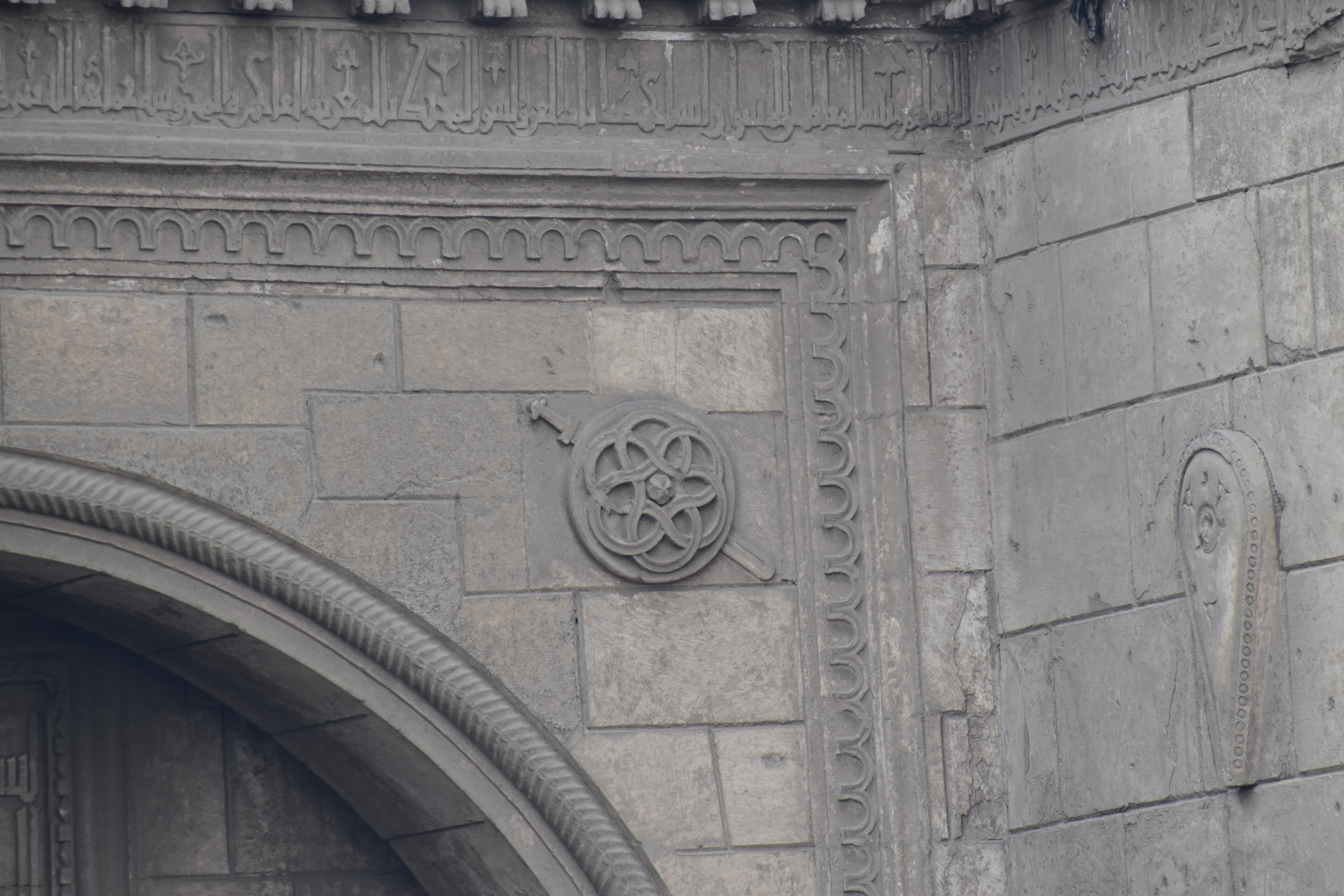
Ali's sword and shield carved on the Bab al-Nasr in Cairo, Egypt.

Often praised for his piety and courage, Ali fought to uphold his beliefs, but was also magnanimous in victory, even risking the ire of some supporters to prevent the enslavement of women. He also showed his grief, wept for the dead, and reportedly prayed over his enemies. Yet Ali has also been criticized for his idealism and political inflexibility, for his egalitarian policies and strict justice antagonized many. These qualities were said to be also present in Muhammad, whom the Quran addresses as, "They wish that thou [Muhammad] might compromise and that they might compromise." At any rate, these qualities of Ali, rooted in his religious beliefs, contributed to his image today for his followers as a paragon of Islamic virtues, particularly justice. Ali is also viewed as the model par excellence for Islamic chivalry (futuwwa).

Historical accounts about Ali are often tendentious. For instance, in person, Ali is described in some Sunni sources as bald, heavy-built, short-legged, with broad shoulders, hairy body, long white beard, and affected by eye inflammation. Shia accounts about the appearance of Ali are markedly different. Those perhaps better match his reputation as a capable warrior. Likewise, Ali is presented in some Sunni sources as rough, brusque, and unsociable. By contrast, Shia sources describe him as generous, gentle, and cheerful, to the point that the Syrian war propaganda accused him of frivolity. Shia and Sufi sources are also replete with reports about his acts of kindness, especially to the poor. The necessary qualities in a commander, described in a letter attributed to Ali, may have well been a portrait of himself: slow to anger, happy to pardon, kind to the weak, and severe with the strong. His companion, Sa'sa'a ibn Suhan, described him similarly, "He [Ali] was amongst us as one of us, of gentle disposition, intense humility, leading with a light touch, even though we were in awe of him with the kind of awe that a bound prisoner has before one who holds a sword over his head."

== Assessment and legacy ==
Ali
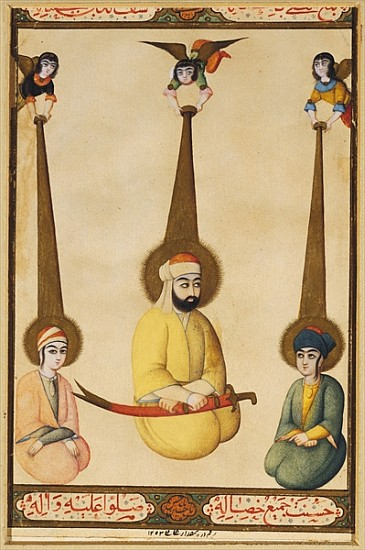
- Gouache illustration of Ali (centre) and his sons, Hasan and Husayn, 1838, by an unknown painter

Caliph; Imam
- Venerated in: Islam; Baháʼí Faith; Druze Faith; Yarsanism
- Major shrine: Imam Ali Shrine, Najaf

=== In Islam ===
Ali's place is said to be second only to Muhammad in Shiasim. Ali is revered for his courage, honesty, unbending devotion to Islam, magnanimity, and equal treatment of all Muslims. For his admirers, he has thus become the archetype of uncorrupted Islam and pre-Islamic chivalry.

==== In the Quran ====
Ali regularly represented Muhammad in missions which are commonly linked to Quranic injunctions. For instance, the verse of walaya (5:55) is a reference to when Ali gave his ring to a beggar, while praying in the mosque, according to Shia and some Sunni accounts. If so, then this verse gives Ali the same spiritual authority (walaya) as Muhammad. In Shia sources, the verse of tabligh (5:67) spurred Muhammad to designate Ali as his successor at the Ghadir Khumm, while the verse of ikmal al-din (5:3) subsequently announced the perfection of Islam. The verse of purification (33:33) concerns the status of purity of the Ahl al-Bayt (lit. 'people of the house'), which is limited to Ali, Fatima, and their two sons in Shia and some Sunni sources. Another reference to the Ahl al-Bayt might be the verse of mawadda (42:23). For Shias, this verse is a Quranic mandate to love and follow the Ahl al-Bayt.

==== In the Hadith ====
Muhammad frequently praise the qualities of Ali. The most controversial such statement, "He whose mawla I am, Ali is his mawla," was delivered at the Ghadir Khumm. This gave Ali the same spiritual authority (walaya) as Muhammad, according to the Shia. Elsewhere, the hadith of the position likens Muhammad and Ali to Moses and Aaron, and thus supports the usurped right of Ali to succeed Muhammad in Shia Islam. Other examples in standard Shia and Sunni collections of hadith include, "There is no youth braver than Ali," "No-one but a believer loves Ali, and no-one but a hypocrite (munafiq) hates Ali," "I am from Ali, and Ali is from me, and he is the wali (lit. 'patron' or 'guardian') of every believer after me," "The truth revolves around him [Ali] wherever he goes," "I am the city of knowledge and Ali is its gate (bab)," "Ali is with the Quran and the Quran is with Ali. They will not separate until they return to me at the [paradisal] pool."

==== In Sufism ====
Ali is the common source of mystical and spiritual currents within both Sunni and Shia sects of Islam. In particular, Ali is the spiritual head of some Sufi movements, for Sufis believe that Ali inherited from Muhammad his esoteric knowledge and saintly authority, which guide believers on their journey toward God. Nearly all Sufi orders trace their lineage to Muhammad through Ali, an exception being the Naqshbandis, who reach Muhammad through Abu Bakr.

==== In Sunni Islam ====
In Sunni Islam, Ali is venerated as a close companion of Muhammad, a foremost authority on the Quran and Islamic law, and the fountainhead of wisdom in Sunni spirituality. When Muhammad died in 632, Ali had his claims to leadership, perhaps in reference to the Ghadir Khumm, but he eventually accepted the temporal rule of the first three caliphs in the interest of Muslim unity. Ali is portrayed in Sunni sources as a trusted advisor of the first three caliphs, while their conflicts with Ali are minimized, in line with the Sunni tendency to show accord among companions. As the fourth and final Rashidun caliph, Ali holds a particularly high status in Sunni Islam, although this doctrinal reverence for Ali is a recent development for which the prominent Sunni traditionist Ibn Hanbal (d. 855) is likely to be credited. Sunni hierarchy of companions places Ali below his three predecessors and above those who fought against him. This ordering has required Sunni reinterpretation of those prophetic sayings that explicitly elevate Ali above all companions.

==== In Shia Islam ====
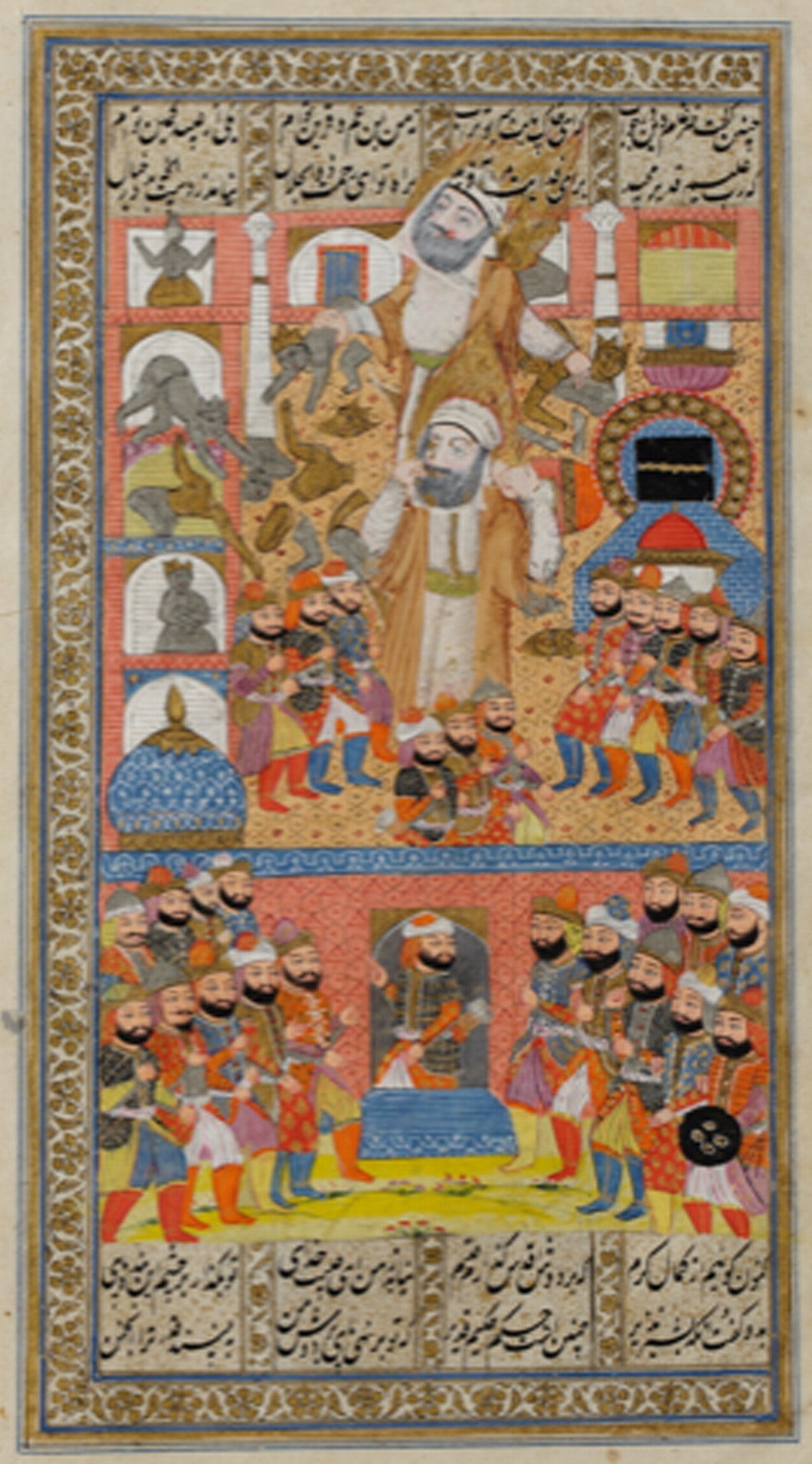
A c. 18th century miniature painting from India, showing Muhammad and Ali removing idols from the Kaaba. Muhammad urges Ali to stand on his shoulders, as a symbolic representation of Ali being his rightful successor.

Ali takes center stage in Shia Islam: The Arabic word shi'a itself is short for 'shi'a of Ali' (lit. 'followers of Ali'), his name is incorporated into the daily call to prayer (adhan), and he is regarded as the foremost companion of Muhammad. The defining doctrine of Shia Islam is that Ali was the rightful successor of Muhammad through divinely-ordained designation, which is primarily a reference to the Ghadir Khumm. Ali is thought to have inherited the political and religious authority of Muhammad, even before his ascension to the caliphate in 656. In particular, Ali's predecessors are regarded as illegitimate rulers and usurpers of his rights. The all-encompassing bond of loyalty between Shia Muslims and their imams (and Muhammad in his capacity as imam) is known as walaya. Ali is also thought to be endowed with the privilege of intercession on the Judgment Day. Early on, some Shias even attributed divinity to Ali, but such extreme views were gradually rooted out of Shi'ism.

In Shia belief, Ali also inherited the esoteric knowledge of Muhammad, for instance, in view of the prophetic hadith, "I [Muhammad] am the city of knowledge, and Ali is its gate." Ali is thus regarded, after Muhammad, as the interpreter, par excellence, of the Quran and the sole authoritative source of its (esoteric) teachings. Unlike Muhammad, however, Ali is not thought to have received divine revelation (wahy), though he might have been guided by divine inspiration (ilham). Verse 21:73 of the Quran is sometimes cited here, "We made them imams, guiding by Our command, and We revealed (awhayna') to them the performance of good deeds, the maintenance of prayers, and the giving of zakat (alms), and they used to worship Us." Shia Muslims also believe in the infallibility of Ali, as with Muhammad, that is, their divine protection from sins. Here, the verse of purification is sometimes cited. Ali's words and deeds are therefore considered a model for the Shia community and a source for their religious injunctions.

==== In Ibadism ====
In Ibadism, Ali occupies a complex position distinct from both veneration and condemnation. Initially, Ibadis actively supported Ali and his campaigns against the rebellions of Aisha and Mu'awiya, viewing his early leadership as grounded in Quranic principles. However, the Ibadi tradition holds that Ali forfeited his right to lead when he agreed to human arbitration at the Battle of Siffin. From the Ibadi perspective, this decision constituted an abandonment of divine mandate, rendering him unfit for the imamate.

This stance was reinforced by Ali's subsequent military actions at the Battle of Nahrawan, where his forces fought the Ahl al-Nahr (lit. 'People of the River'). Ibadis regard these opponents as the true keepers of the faith, whose leader, Abd Allah ibn Wahb al-Rasibi, was chosen as the legitimate imam following Ali's error at Siffin. Consequently, in Ibadi historiography, Ali is not viewed as a rightly-guided figure in his later years.

==== In Alawism ====
The Alawites venerate Ali, the first of the Twelve Imams, as the physical manifestation of God. Even, the Alawite testimony of faith (shahada) translates as "there is no God but Ali". The Alawite trinity envisions God as being composed of three distinct manifestations, Ma'na (meaning), Ism (Name) and Bab (Door); which together constitute an "indivisible trinity". Ma'na symbolises the "source and meaning of all things" in Alawite mythology. According to Alawite doctrines, Ma'na generated the Ism, which in turn built the Bab. These beliefs are closely tied to the Alawite doctrine of reincarnations of the trinity. The final trinity of reincarnation in the Alawite trinity consists of Ali (Ma'na), Muhammad (Ism) and Salman the Persian (Bab). Alawites depict them as the sky, sun and moon respectively. Alawites deify Ali as the "last and supreme manifestation of God" who built the universe, attribute to him divine superiority, and believe that Ali created Muhammad and gave him the mission to spread Qur'anic teachings on earth.

=== In other religions ===
In the Druze faith, Ali is considered a "minor prophet," like Plato and Socrates. Even though the faith originally developed out of the Isma'ili branch of Shia Islam, the Druze are not Muslims, and do not accept the five pillars of Islam. In Yarsanism, a religion founded by the Kurdish mystic Sultan Sahak, Ali is thought to be an incarnation of God, and superior to Muhammad, but their image as a Ghulat (lit. 'exaggerators' or 'extremists') subsect of Shia Islam is incorrect.

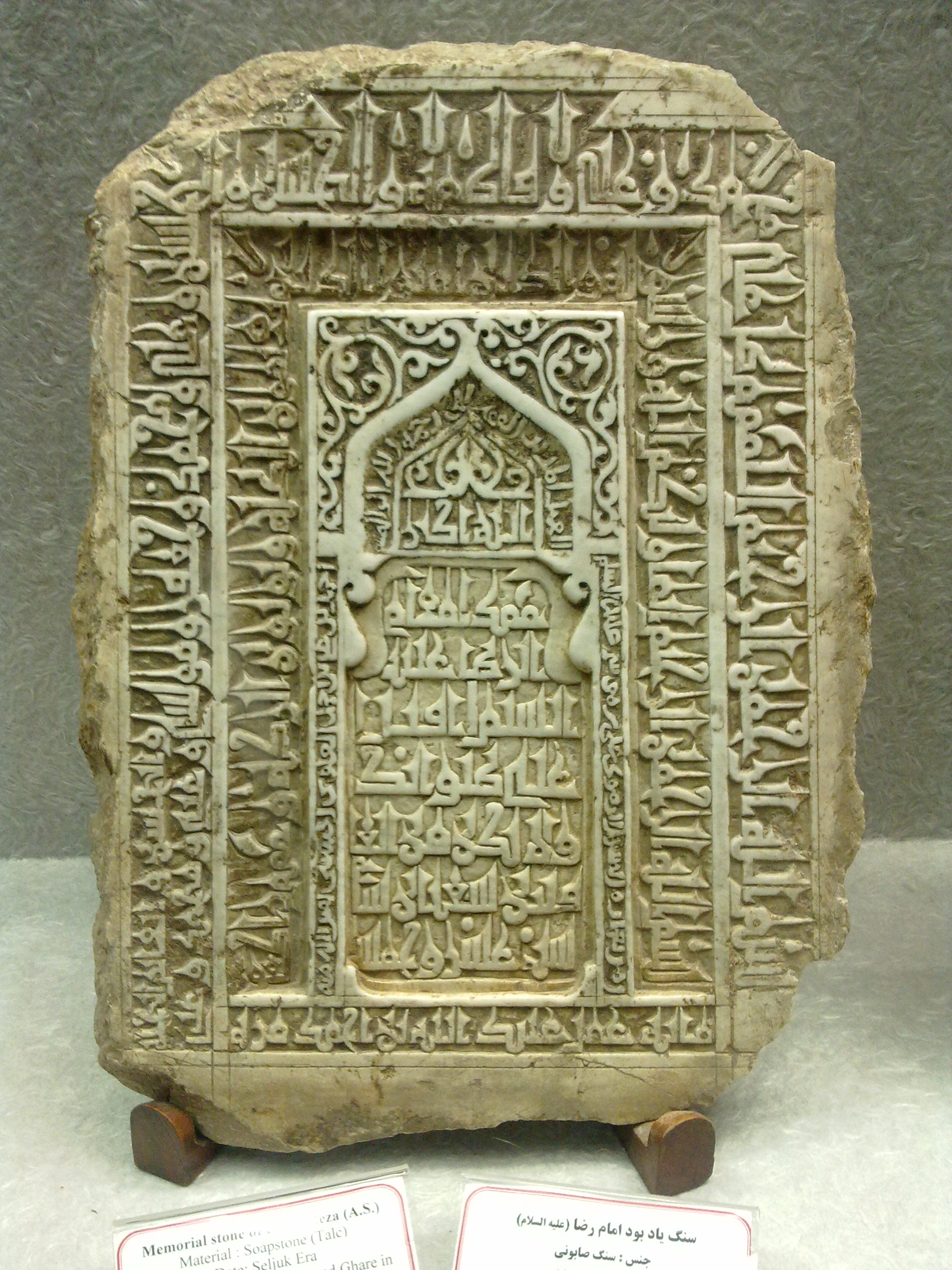
The verse of walaya, possibly the most controversial statement in the Quran linked to Ali, is engraved on the margins of this memorial stone, dating to the Seljuk era

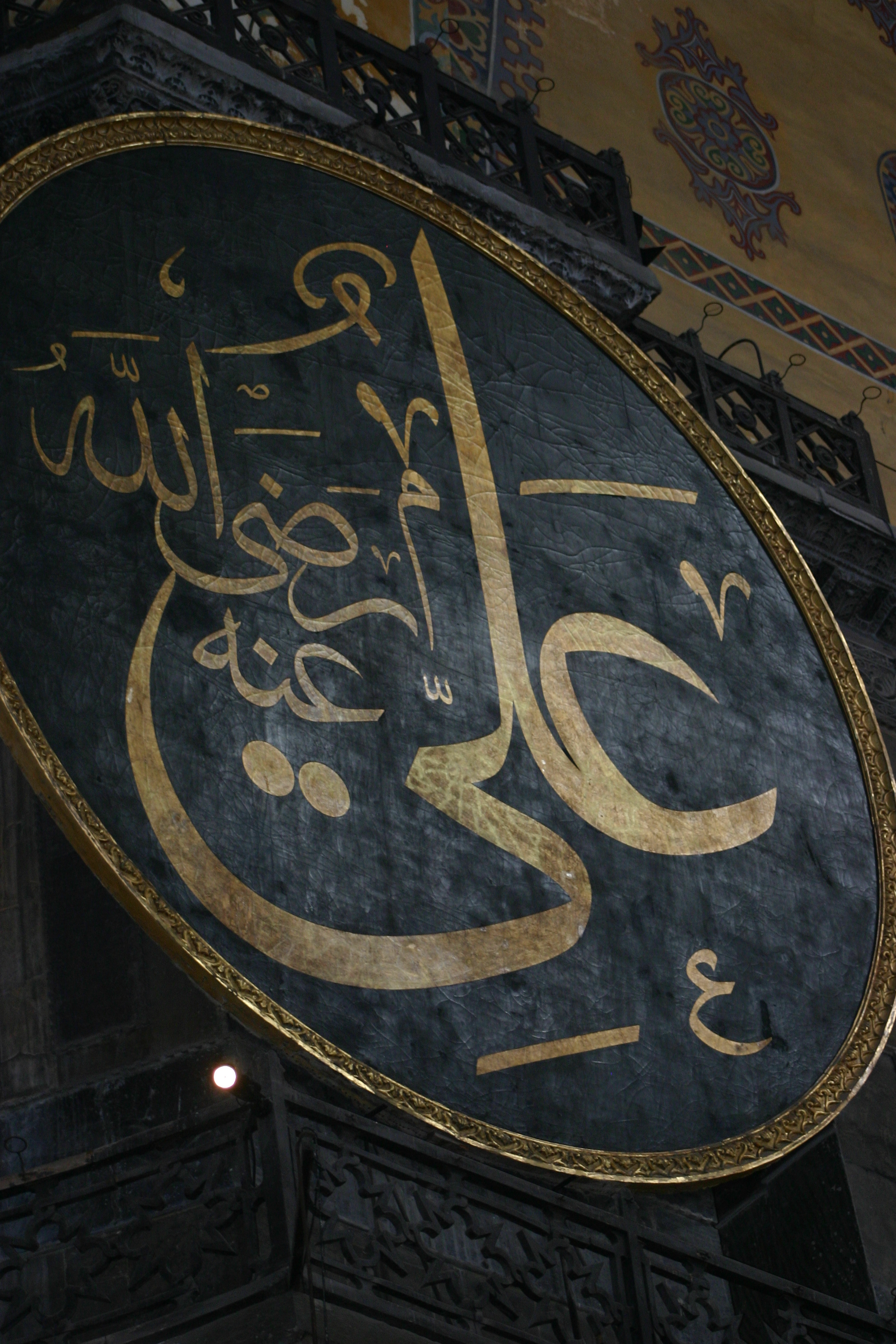
The word 'Ali' in Arabic calligraphy, inscribed in Hagia Sophia, Turkey

Ali with his sons, nineteenth century Iranian tapestry

== Historiography ==
Much has been written about Ali in Islamic literature, second only to Muhammad. However, much of this material is colored by a positive or negative bias towards Ali. The primary sources about Ali are the Quran, hadiths, and other early Islamic works, the most notable being The Book of Sulaym ibn Qays, attributed to a companion of Ali. Such works were initially scarce, but this changed with the introduction of affordable paper in the Abbasid period. For instance, at least twenty-one monographs were composed on the Battle of Siffin between 750 and 950, thirteen of which were authored by the early historian Abu Mikhnaf (d. 773–774). Most of these monographs are not extant except through quotations in later collections, such as the tenth-century Tarikh al-Tabari. In addition to numerous works authored by Muslims, the secondary sources about Ali include writings of Arab Christians, Hindus, and also works by Western scholars. When writing about Ali, early Western scholars often dismissed as fabricated the reports gathered in later periods because their authors often advanced their own Sunni or Shia partisan views. For instance, L. Caetani (d. 1935) often rejected the historical reports attributed to the pro-Ali Ibn Abbas and anti-Ali Aisha. Caetani instead preferred accounts reported without isnad by early historians like Ibn Ishaq (d. 767). By contrast, W. Madelung (d. 2023) argued that the tendentiousness of a report alone does not imply its fabrication. Madelung instead advocated for the authentication of historical reports on the basis of their compatibility with other events and figures.

== Historical reliability ==
Unveiling Ali's inner world is highly important for religious groups such as Shia and Alawite; similarly, presenting his pure and unexaggerated story as the Rashidun Caliph is historically significant. However, this period is archaeologically poor and largely consists of oral traditions until the rise of the Abbasids. While classical Islamic scholarship developed methodologies such as the science of biography and the "chain of imputation" to evaluate the reliability -usually varies according to religious sects- of these manaqib narratives, prominent figures like Ibn Khaldun introduced critical historiographical methods, emphasizing the importance of context and the systematic evaluation of historical data. On the other hand modern Western scholarship seeks to support traditional narratives with objective data and external sources.(see: Historical criticism) Limited archaeological evidence suggests that the Rashidun period lacked a distinct Islamic identity, and that its early conquests were likely a secular Arabic expansion rather than a religiously-Islamic driven expansion. The expansion neither forced the population to convert to Islam nor oppressed the non-Muslim population.

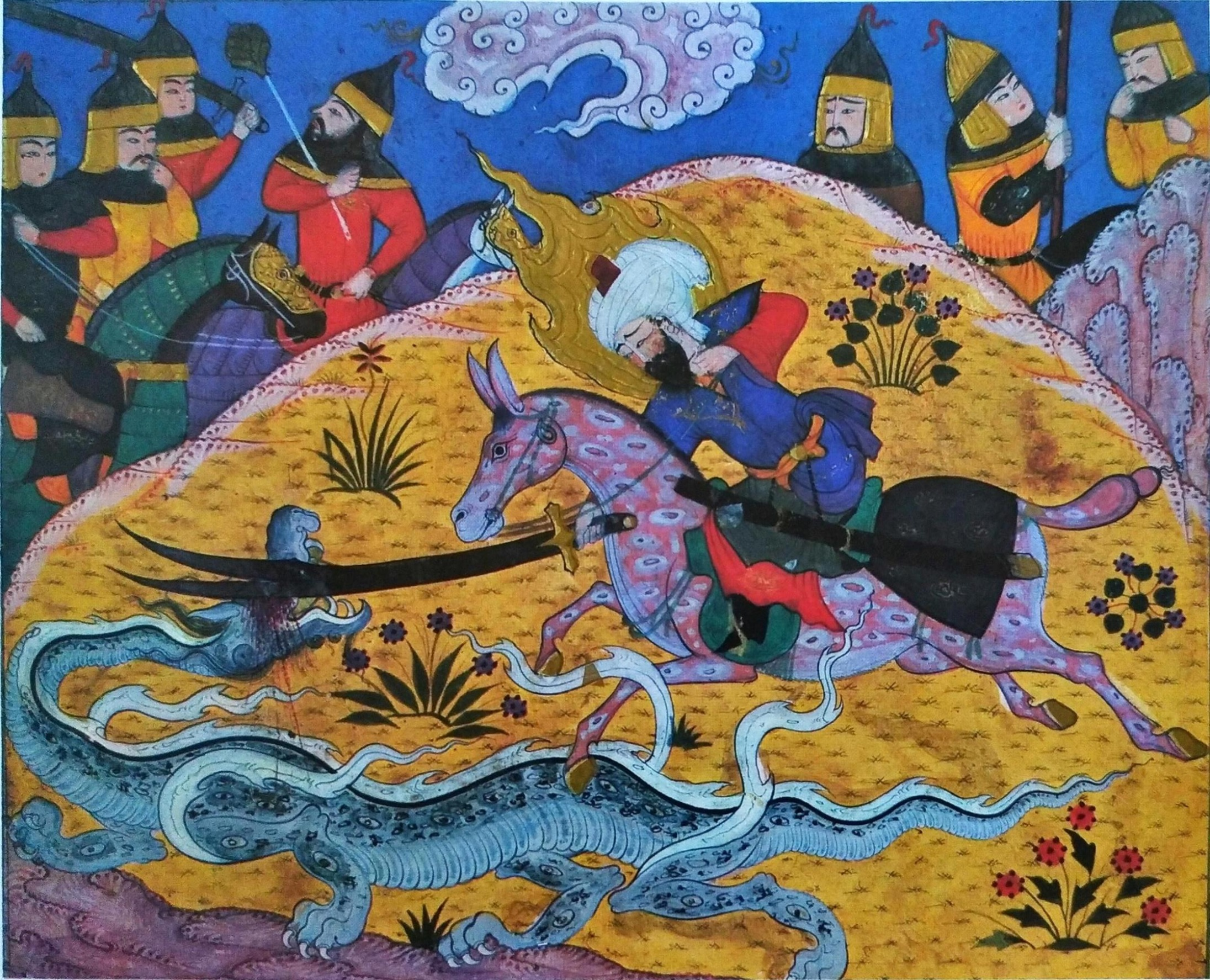
An Iranian miniature dated to 1426 AD, depicting Ali killing the dragon using his double-edged sword Zulfiqar.

Much has been written about Ali in Islamic literature, second only to Muhammad. However, the sayings and stories attributed to him are compilations from several centuries after his time. For example Nahj al-balāgha is the best-known collection of sermons, letters, and sayings attributed to Ali was the compilation credited to Sharif al-Radi (d. 1015). Critics of hadith emphasize that, among other things, the most common forms of fabricated hadith are those of a political nature, which include the glorification (fadail) of future caliphs and imams (imams in Shi'ism also hold political identities), the condemnation of rivals, or warnings that provide clear information about future events and seditions (Vaticinium ex eventu). Undeniable gaps between individuals' historical identity and their narrative-imaginative identity and life stand before historians as indisputable realities. These identities are sometimes supernatural personalities to whom or their representatives (Imams, Qutbs, Sheikhs) are attributed with unseen powers, including special inspirations and detailed knowledge of the future (books of the unseen), extraordinary charisma beyond human limits to the point of arranging the universe for them (the sunset is delayed for Ali's prayer), and help in great crises ("help me Muhammad, help me Ali").

Western historians describe the purpose of these early biographies as largely to convey a message—of a hagiographic nature—rather than to strictly and accurately record history. Lawrence Conrad examines the early sirah books and sees that the dates of Muhammad's birth span a period of up to 85 years. Conrad defines this as: "the fluidity (evolutionary process) continued even in the written period.". Furthermore, some researchers, such as Volker Popp, consider names like Ali (the exalted one) and Muhammad not as names but as title; "The titles given to Jesus by Assyrian Christians living in the Sasanian Empire are equivalent to Muhammad's New Testament benedictus, ευλογημένος. In a numismatic study, Popp identified coins dating to 16 AH inscribed with mhmd (Arabic written without vowels, but lacking the rasulullah, which became common later). Popp added Arab-Sasanian and Syrian coins inscribed with MHMT in the Pahlavi script, and also partly with mhmd in the Arabic script, combined with Christian symbolism in some cases".

== Cultural depictions ==
=== TV and films ===
Ali has been portrayed in a number of films and television productions. The most prominent television production centered on Ali is the Iranian series Shaheed-e Kufa, directed and written by Davood Mirbagheri. Produced by the IRIB, the series was filmed during the 1990s and originally broadcast in 22 episodes. It follows Ali's life during the final years of Uthman's caliphate and his subsequent caliphate, culminating in his assassination in Kufa. The series depicts major events including the Battle of the Camel, the Battle of Siffin, the arbitration following Siffin, the emergence of the Kharijites, and the Battle of Nahrawan. It became one of the most prominent and influential Iranian television productions about early Islamic history. A feature-length version of it was also produced from the television series. The film presents selected episodes from Ali's life, including his military campaigns, the attack that led to his death, and his martyrdom. Ali has also appeared as a character, or has been represented through events associated with him, in other productions. These include the famous series Mukhtarnameh, which focuses primarily on Mukhtar al-Thaqafi and the aftermath of the Battle of Karbala but includes historical figures and events connected with Ali's family and legacy. Ali is also prominently featured in the historical television series Omar, produced by the MBC and Qatar Television. The series portrays Ali as one of Muhammad's closest companions and depicts his role in several major events during the early Muslim community in Mecca and Medina. It also portrays his relationship with Muhammad, his participation in the early Muslim community, and his later role during the period of the Rashidun caliphs. The series directly portrays Ali, Abu Bakr, Umar, Uthman, and other major figures.

== See also ==
- Bibliography of Ali ibn Abi Talib
- Imamate and guardianship of Ali
- Timeline of Ali's life

== Footnotes ==
Political offices
Ali Banu Hashim Cadet branch of the Quraysh Born: c. 600 Died: c. 28 January 661
Sunni Islam titles
Preceded by Uthman ibn Affan	Caliph of Islam; 4th Rashidun Caliph; 656–661	Succeeded by Hasan ibn Ali
Shia Islam titles
Preceded by Muhammad as Final prophet	Twelver Imam Zaidi Imam Ismaili Imam Alevi Imam Alawite Imam; 632–661	Succeeded by Hasan ibn Ali as Imam
