= Politics and Islam =

Political aspects of the religion of Islam are derived from its religious scripture (the Quran holy book, ḥadīth literature of accounts of the sayings and living habits attributed to the Islamic prophet Muhammad, and sunnah), as well as elements of political movements and tendencies followed by Muslims or Islamic states throughout its history. Shortly after its founding, Islam's prophet Muhammad became a ruler of a state, and the intertwining of religion and state in Islam (and the idea that "politics is central" to Islam), is in contrast to the doctrine of rendering "unto Caesar what belongs to Caesar and to God what belongs to God", of Christianity, its related and neighboring religion.

Traditional political concepts in Islam forming an idealized model of Islamic rule are based on the rule of Muhammad in Mecca (629–632 CE) and his elected or selected successors, known as rāshidūn ("rightly-guided") caliphs in Sunnī Islam, and the Imams in Shīʿa Islam. Concepts include obedience to the Islamic law (sharīʿa); the supremacy of unity, solidarity and community, over individual rights and diversity; the pledging of obedience by the ruled to rulers (al-Bayʿah), with a corresponding duty of rulers to rule justly and seek consultation (shūrā) before making decisions; and the ruled to rebuke unjust rulers. Classical Islamic political thought focuses on advice on how to govern well, rather than reflecting "on the nature of politics".

A sea change in the political history of the Muslim world was the rise of the West and the eventual defeat and dissolution of the Ottoman Empire (1908–1922). In the modern era (19th–20th centuries), common Islamic political themes have been resistance to Western imperialism and enforcement of sharīʿa law through democratic or militant struggle. Increasing the appeal of Islamic movements such as Islamism, Islamic democracy, Islamic fundamentalism, and Islamic revivalism, especially in the context of the global sectarian divide and conflict between Sunnīs and Shīʿītes, have been a number of events; the defeat of Arab armies in the Six-Day War and the subsequent Israeli occupation of East Jerusalem and the rest of the West Bank (1967), the Islamic Revolution in Iran (1979), the collapse of the Soviet Union (1992) bringing an end to the Cold War and to communism as a viable alternative political system, and especially popular dissatisfaction with secularist ruling regimes in the Muslim world.

== Pre-modern Islam ==
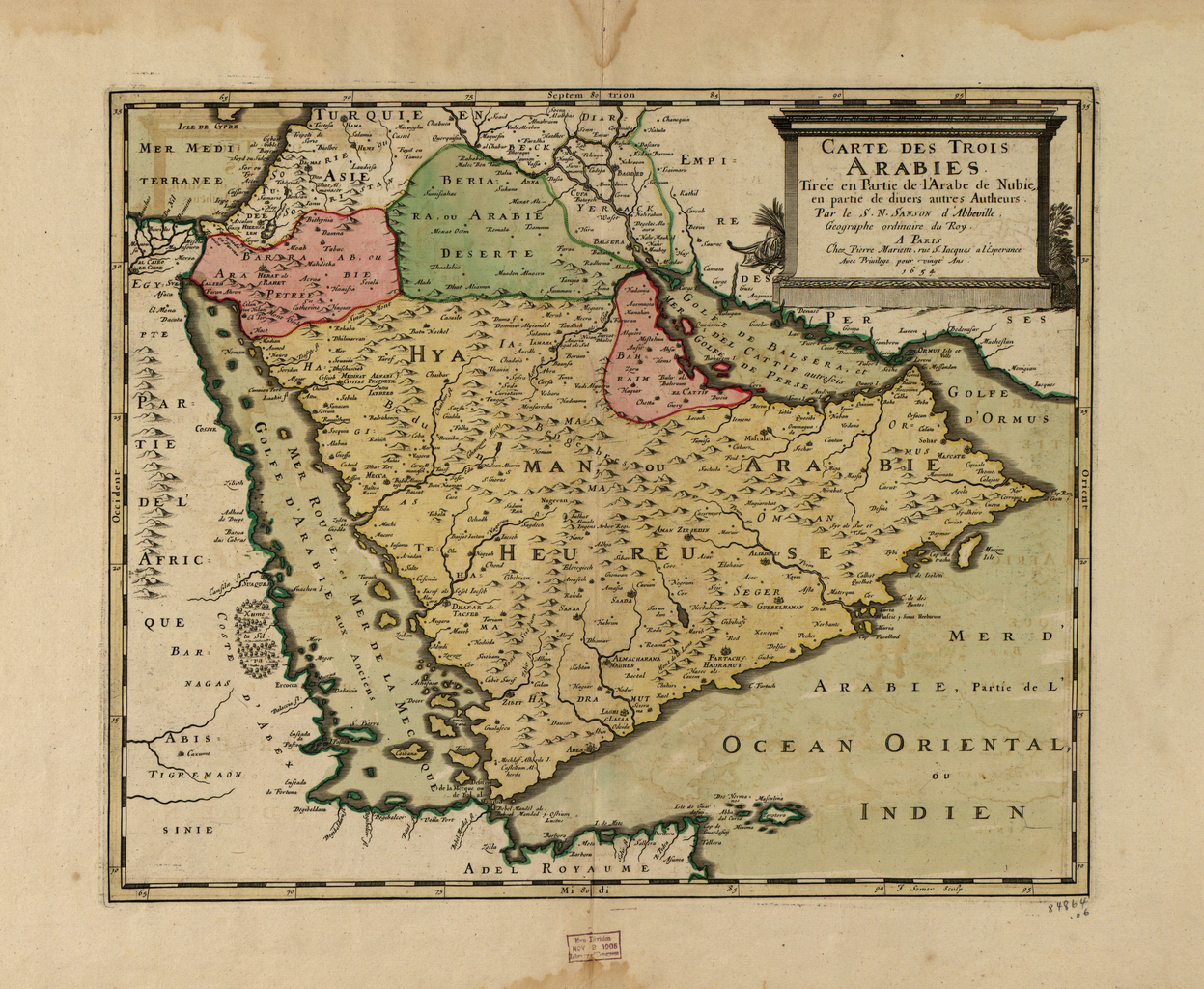
Non-Islamic testimonies about Muhammad's life describe him as the leader of the Saracens, believed to be descendants of Ishmael, that lived in the Roman-era provinces of Arabia Petraea (West) and Arabia Deserta (North).

=== Origins of Islam ===
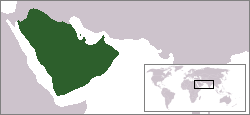
Arabia united under Muhammad's rule (7th century CE) according to traditional accounts

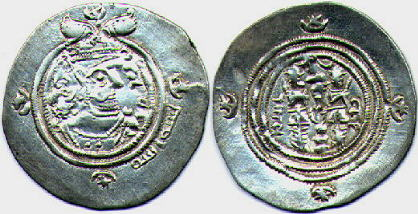
Sasanid style coins in circulation during Rashidun, (Pahlavi scripts, crescent-star, fire altar, depictions of Khosrow II, bismillāh in margin). Unlike known historical figures such as Ibn Zubayr and Mu'awiya I, there are no coins minted in the names of caliphs titled rashidun that could be evidence of official dominancy.

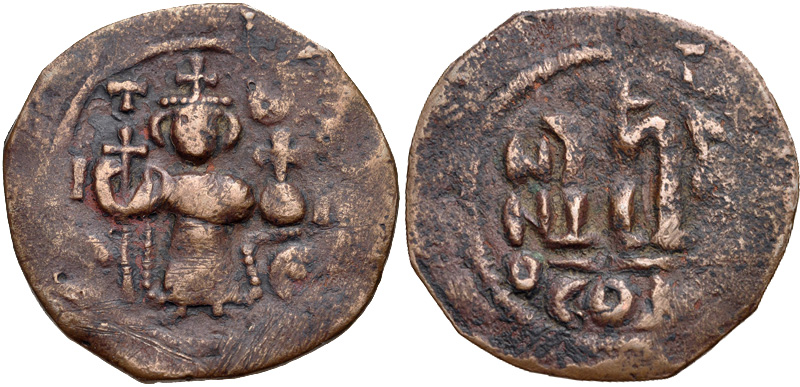
A "Pseudo-Byzantine" coin with depictions of the Byzantine Emperor Constans II holding the cross-tipped staff and globus cruciger. There was no specific Islamic-religious identity and political stance with sharp boundaries in the early Islamic period.

Early Islam arose within the historical, social, political, economic, and religious context of Late Antiquity in the Middle East, in the life and times of the Islamic prophet Muhammad and his successors. (Note: The second half of the 6th century CE saw political disorder in the pre-Islamic Arabian peninsula, and communication routes were no longer secure. Religious divisions played an important role in the crisis. Judaism became the dominant religion of the Himyarite Kingdom in Yemen after about 380 CE, while Christianity took root in the Persian Gulf. There was also a yearning for a more "spiritual form of religion", and "the choice of religion increasingly became an individual rather than a collective issue." While some Arabs were reluctant to convert to a foreign faith, those Abrahamic religions provided "the principal intellectual and spiritual reference points", and Jewish and Christian loanwords from Aramaic began to replace the old pagan vocabulary of Arabic throughout the peninsula. The Ḥanīf ("renunciates"), a group of monotheists that sought to separate themselves both from the foreign Abrahamic religions and the traditional Arab polytheism, were looking for a new religious worldview to replace the pre-Islamic Arabian religions, focusing on "the all-encompassing father god Allah whom they freely equated with the Jewish Yahweh and the Christian Jehovah." In their view, Mecca was originally dedicated to this monotheistic faith that they considered to be the one true religion, established by the patriarch Abraham.) According to the traditional account, the Islamic prophet Muhammad was born in Mecca around the year 570 CE. His family belonged to the Arab clan of Quraysh, which was the chief tribe of Mecca and a dominant force in western Arabia. To counter the effects of anarchy, they upheld the institution of "sacred months" when all violence was forbidden and travel was safe. The polytheistic Kaaba shrine in Mecca and the surrounding area was a popular pilgrimage destination, which had significant economic consequences for the city.

While Muhammad's region had tribes, it did not have a state. Unlike its neighboring major religion, Christianity, (whose adherents were a minority in their region and subject "to suspicion and often to persecution" among Israelites and Romans until the conversion of Emperor Constantine), Islam formed a state very early. Daniel Pipes argues that it had little choice.

Muhammad founded a religious community ex nihilo. He lived in western Arabia, a stateless region where tribal affiliations dominated all of public life. A tribe protected its members (by threatening to take revenge for them), and it provided social bonds, economic opportunities, as well as political enfranchisement. Individuals lacking tribal ties had no standing, and could be robbed, raped, and killed with impunity. If Muhammad was to attract tribesmen to join his religious movement, he had to provide them with an affiliation no less powerful than the tribe they had left behind. Thus Muslim leaders offered a range of services resembling those of tribal chiefs, protecting their followers, organizing them for wars of booty, dispensing justice, and so forth.

The real intentions of Muhammad regarding the spread of Islam, its political undertone, and his missionary activity (da’wah) during his lifetime are a matter of debate extensively discussed among Muslim scholars and non-Muslim scholars within the academic field of Islamic studies. Authors, activists, and historians have proposed different understandings of Muhammad's intent and religio-political mission in pre-Islamic Arabian society. Larry Poston asks,

Was it in Muhammad's mind to produce a world religion or did his interests lie mainly within the confines of his homeland? Was he solely an Arab nationalist—a political genius intent upon uniting the proliferation of tribal clans under the banner of a new religion—or was his vision a truly international one, encompassing a desire to produce a reformed humanity in the midst of a new world order? These questions are not without significance, for a number of the proponents of contemporary da’wah activity in the West trace their inspiration to the prophet himself, claiming that he initiated a worldwide missionary program in which they are the most recent participants. [...] Despite the claims of these and other writers, it is difficult to prove that Muhammad intended to found a world-encompassing faith superseding the religions of Christianity and Judaism. His original aim appears to have been the establishment of a succinctly Arab brand of monotheism, as indicated by his many references to the Qurʾān as an Arab book and by his accommodations to other monotheistic traditions.

Journalist historian Thomas W. Lippman also points out the emphasis in the Quran on the "Arabness" of Muhammad's mission and of Muhammad's "professed intention" to bring a (holy) book to people who had none — "that is, to the Arabs".

=== Quran ===
==== Legal rule and political themes ====
The Qurʾān is conceived in Islam to be the word of God as spoken to Muḥammad and passed on his followers and the rest of humanity "in exactly the same form as it was received". Some commands did not extend past the life of Muhammad, such as ones to refer quarrels to Allah and Muhammad or not to shout at or raise your voice when talking to Muhammad. Out of the approximately 6000 verses of the Quran, 250–300 deal with legal aspects of "civil, criminal, moral, community, family and personal affairs", and of these verses only a relatively small number concern issues of a "political nature". Also limiting its political relevance is the fact that the Quran doesn't mention "any formal and continuing structure of authority", only orders to obey Muhammad, and that its themes were of limited use when the success of Islam meant governance of "a vast territory populate mainly peasants, and dominate by cities and states" alien to nomadic life in the desert. Historian Thomas W. Lippman finds only the verse enjoying men to "conduct their affairs by mutual consent" as a general advice in the Quran on leading a community.

While the Quran doesn't dwell on politics, it does make mention of concepts such as "the oppressed" (mustad'afeen), "emigration" (hijra), the "Muslim community" (Ummah), and "fighting" or "struggling" in the way of God (jihād), that can have political implications. A number of Quranic verses (such as 4:98) talk about the mustad'afeen, which can be translated as "those deemed weak", "underdogs", or "the oppressed", how they are put upon by people such as the pharaoh, how God wishes them to be treated justly, and how they should emigrate from the land where they are oppressed (4:99). Abraham was an "emigrant unto my Lord" (29:25). War against "unbelievers" (kuffār) is commanded and divine aid promised, although some verses state this may be when unbelievers start the war and treaties may end the war. The Quran also devotes some verses to the proper division of spoils captured in war among the victors. War against internal enemies or "hypocrites" (munāfiḳūn) is also commanded.

==== Context of its revelation ====
Most likely Muhammad was "intimately aware of Jewish belief and practices", and acquainted with the Ḥanīf (pre-Islamic Arabians who were Abrahamic monotheists). Like the Ḥanīf, Muhammad practiced Taḥannuth, spending time in seclusion at Mount Hira and "turning away from paganism." When he was about 40 years old, he began receiving at mount Hira' what Muslims regard as divine revelations delivered through the angel Gabriel, which would later form the Quran. These inspirations urged him to proclaim a strict monotheistic faith, as the final expression of Biblical prophetism earlier codified in the sacred texts of Judaism and Christianity; to warn his compatriots of the impending Judgement Day; and to castigate social injustices of his city. (Note: "Key themes in these early recitations include the idea of the moral responsibility of man who was created by God and the idea of the judgment to take place on the day of resurrection. [...] Another major theme of Muhammad's early preaching, [... is that] there is a power greater than man's, and that the wise will acknowledge this power and cease their greed and suppression of the poor.") Muhammad's message won over a handful of followers (the ṣaḥāba) and was met with increasing opposition from Meccan notables. (Note: "At first Muhammad met with no serious opposition [...] He was only gradually led to attack on principle the gods of Mecca. [...] Meccan merchants then discovered that a religious revolution might be dangerous to their fairs and their trade.") In 622 CE, a few years after losing protection with the death of his influential uncle ʾAbū Ṭālib ibn ʿAbd al-Muṭṭalib, Muhammad migrated to the city of Yathrib (subsequently called Medina) where he was joined by his followers. Later generations would count this event, known as the hijra, as the start of the Islamic era.

In Yathrib, where he was accepted as an arbitrator among the different communities of the city under the terms of the Constitution of Medina, Muhammad began to lay the foundations of the new Islamic society, with the help of new Quranic verses which provided guidance on matters of law and religious observance. The surahs of this period emphasized his place among the long line of Biblical prophets, but also differentiated the message of the Quran from the sacred texts of Christianity and Judaism. Armed conflict with the Arab Meccans and Jewish tribes of the Yathrib area soon broke out. After a series of military confrontations and political manoeuvres, Muhammad was able to secure control of Mecca and allegiance of the Quraysh in 629 CE. In the time remaining until his death in 632 CE, tribal chiefs across the Arabian peninsula entered into various agreements with him, some under terms of alliance, others acknowledging his claims of prophethood and agreeing to follow Islamic practices, including paying the alms levy to his government, which consisted of a number of deputies, an army of believers, and a public treasury.

=== Muhammad's rule in Medina ===
In 622 CE, in recognition of his claims to prophethood, Muhammad was invited to rule the city of Medina. At the time the local Arab tribes of Aus and Khazraj dominated the town, and were in constant conflict. Medinans considered Muhammad as an impartial outsider who could resolve the conflict. Muhammad and his followers thus moved to Medina, where about the same year as his arrival, (Note: W.M. Watt argues that the initial agreement was shortly after the hijra and the document was amended at a later date specifically after the battle of Badr (AH [anno hijra] 2, = AD 624).) (Note: R. B. Serjeant argues that the constitution is in fact eight different treaties which can be dated according to events as they transpired in Medina with the first treaty being written shortly after Muhammad's arrival.) (Note: Julius Wellhausen argues that the document is a single treaty agreed upon shortly after the hijra, and that it belongs to the first year of Muhammad’s residence in Medina, before the battle of Badr in 2/624. Wellhausen bases this judgement on three considerations; first Muhammad is very diffident about his own position, he accepts the Pagan tribes within the Umma, and maintains the Jewish clans as clients of the Ansars) (Note: Moshe Gil, a skeptic of Islamic history, argues that it was written within five months of Muhammad's arrival in Medina.) Muhammad drafted a document often called the Constitution of Medina. It constituted a formal agreement between Muhammad and all of the significant tribes and families of Yathrib (later known as Medina), including Muslims, Jews, Christians, and Arab Pagans. and dealt with tribal affairs during Muhammad's time in Medina

The document was drawn up with the explicit concern of bringing to an end the bitter intertribal fighting between the clans of the Aws (Aus and Khazraj) within Medina. To this effect it instituted a number of rights and responsibilities for the Muslim, Jewish, Christian, and Pagan communities of Medina, bringing them within the fold of one community: the Ummah. It formed the basis of the First Islamic State, a multi-religious polity under his leadership. Many tribal groups are mentioned, including the Banu Najjar and Quraysh, as well as many tribal institutions, like vengeance, blood money, ransom, alliance, and clientage. The laws Muhammad established during his rule, based on the Quran and his own doing, are considered by Muslims to be sharīʿa or Islamic law, which Islamic movements seek to re-establish in the present day. Muhammad gained a widespread following and an army, and his rule expanded first to the city of Mecca and then spread across the Arabian peninsula through a combination of diplomacy and military conquests.

=== Early Caliphate and political ideals ===
Early Muslim conquests, 622–750: Expansion under Muhammad, 622–632 Expansion under the Rāshidūn Caliphate, 632–661 Expansion under the Umayyad Caliphate, 661–750

After the death of Muhammad in 632 CE, his community of Muslims needed to appoint a new leader. This leader became known as caliph (Arabic: خَليفة, romanized: khalīfa, lit. 'successor'), and the Islamic empires the caliph ruled as "caliphates". The first series of caliphs—Abū Bakr (632–634), ʿUmar ibn al-Khaṭṭāb (Umar І, 634–644), ʿUthmān ibn ʿAffān (644–656), and ʿAlī ibn Abī Ṭālib (656–661)—are known as the rāshidūn ("rightly-guided") caliphs in Sunnī Islam. They oversaw the initial phase of the early Muslim conquests, advancing through Persia, the Levant, Egypt, and North Africa, and along with Muhammad's rule in Medina are looked upon by Sunni as models to be followed.

Alongside the growth of the Umayyad Caliphate, the major political development within early Islam in this period was the sectarian split and political divide between Sunnī, Shīʿa, and Kharijite Muslims; this had its roots in a dispute over the succession for the role of caliph. Sunnīs believed the caliph was elective and any Muslim from the Arab clan of Quraysh, the tribe of Muhammad, might serve as one. Shīʿītes, on the other hand, believed the proper leadership of the Muslim community (known as Imams) should be hereditary in the bloodline of Muhammad, and thus all the caliphs (from the Shīʿa perspective), with the exceptions of Muhammad's cousin and son-in-law ʿAlī ibn Abī Ṭālib and his firstborn son Ḥasan, were actually illegitimate usurpers. However, the Sunnī sect emerged as triumphant in most regions of the Muslim world, with the exceptions of Iran and Oman; thus, most modern Islamic political ideologies and movements are founded in Sunnī thought. Muhammad's closest companions (ṣaḥāba), the four "rightly-guided" caliphs who succeeded him, continued to expand the Islamic empire to encompass Jerusalem, Ctesiphon, and Damascus, and sending Arab Muslim armies as far as the Sindh region. The early Islamic empire stretched from al-Andalus (in modern day Spain) to the Punjab region (in modern day Pakistan) under the reign of the Umayyad dynasty.

==== Expansion of the Caliphate ====
The era of Muhammad's rule from Medina and the rule of his companions (the Rashidun Caliphate) was the era that Sunni Muslims look to as a model for Muslims to follow, but was also an era when Islam began its rapid expansion over a vast geographical area—conquered the collapsing Sasanian Persian Empire and most of the Byzantine Empire. In the centuries of islamic history to come this expansion was slowed (and even reversed in the era of Western colonization), nonetheless it was this era of military success that colored many rules of fiqh/sharia in governance and relations with foreign non-Muslins lands (division of the world into Dar al-Islam and Dar al-Harb, how to treat slaves captured from conquered people, how to divide up spoils from raids on the enemy, etc.).

==== Selecting a leader ====
===== Election, shura =====
Western scholar of Islam, Fred Donner, argues that the standard Arabian practice during the early caliphates was for the prominent men of a kinship group, or tribe, to gather after a leader's death and elect a political leader from amongst themselves, although there was no specified procedure for this consultation or consultative assembly (shūrā). Candidates were usually from the same lineage as the deceased leader but they were not necessarily his sons. Capable men who would lead well were preferred over an ineffectual direct heir, as there was no basis in the majority Sunnī view that the head of state or governor should be chosen based on lineage alone.

An important Islamic concept concerning the structure of ruling is the consultation (shūrā) with people regarding their affairs, which is the duty of rulers mentioned in two Quranic verses:

"...those who answer the call of their Lord and establish the prayer, and who conduct their affairs by Shura. [are loved by God]"^{[42:38]}

"...consult them (the people) in their affairs. Then when you have taken a decision (from them), put your trust in Allah"^{[3:159]} (3:153)

In Sunnī Islam, the ideal selection process for the caliphs — who were successors of Muhammad in political authority and heads of the caliphate—was to follow the "doctrine of elective succession", whereby the political representatives of the people, engaging in consultation (shūrā), choose the new caliph. The model for this was the rāshidūn ("rightly-guided") caliphs — Abū Bakr (632–634), ʿUthmān ibn ʿAffān (644–656), and ʿAlī ibn Abī Ṭālib (656–661) — who were elected, (at least in the parlance of Sunni jurists). According to Bernard Lewis, the case for consultation as opposed to "arbitrary personal rule", is supported "by a considerable body of material" in Muslim literature - "by traditionist ... by commentators ... and by numerous later writers in Arabic, Persian and Turkish". But despite all this recommendation, the doctrine of consultation only reaches the level of recommended (Mustahabb) not commanded (farḍ/wājib) in Islamic fiqh, and arbitrary rule is only condemned (Makruh), not forbidden (ḥarām/maḥzūr).

Other requirements for the Caliph differ according to scholars and schools. According to one source, the caliph should be a member of the Quraysh tribe (according to Al-Māwardī, a Sunnī Muslim jurist of the Shāfiʿī school of Islamic jurisprudence); or alternately that they should simply be elected from the majority (according to Abu Bakr al-Baqillani, an Ashʿarī Sunnī Muslim scholar and Mālikī jurist, and Abu Hanifa an-Nu‘man, the founder of the Sunnī Ḥanafī school.)

==== Majlis ash-Shura ====
Traditional Sunnī Muslim jurists agree that the shura, loosely translated as "consultation", is a function of the Islamic caliphate. The phrase used to denote those qualified to appoint or depose a caliph or another ruler on behalf of the Ummah, was Ahl al-Ḥall wa’l-‘Aḳd (Arabic: أهل الحلّ والعقد, lit. 'those who are qualified to unbind and to bind' or sometimes 'the people of the solution and the contract'). Deliberations in the politics of the early caliphates, most notably the Rāshidūn Caliphate, were not "democratic" in the modern sense of the term; rather, decision-making power laid with a council (Majlis ash-Shura) of notable and trusted companions of Muhammad (ṣaḥāba) and representatives of different Arab tribes (most of them selected or elected within their tribes).

The Majlis-ash-Shura advises the caliph. Al-Mawardi wrote that members of the majlis should satisfy three conditions: they must be just, they must have enough knowledge to distinguish a good caliph from a bad one, and must have sufficient wisdom and judgment to select the best caliph. Al-Mawardi also stated that in case of emergencies when there is no caliphate and no majlis, the people themselves should institute a council of majlis, select a list of candidates for the role of caliph, then the majlis should select from the list of candidates.

===== Titles and rulers =====
After the "Islamic Golden Age" of the Rashidun, selection increasingly took the form of the ruler/caliph (as the representative of the community), nominating his successor, often leading to a caliphal dynasty. As the caliphate moved away from its ideal, caliphs were often times not only not elected but not in charge, becoming figureheads, (starting with the last centuries of the Abbasid Caliphate).

Through the Islamic middle ages (with the exception of the Fatimid Caliphate starting in the 10th century) there was only one caliph. After the Ottoman empire conquered the Mamluk sultanate in 1517, the caliphate was reportedly transferred to Ottoman empire, ending the age of the "universal caliphate". In the 1774, however, in the Treaty of Küçük Kaynarca, the Ottoman empire claimed the title of "supreme religious head of Islam" for its caliph.

Other sovereign titles used in the Muslim world include amīr, sulṭān, king. The first military figures who usurped power from the caliphs were the amirs of the provinces, by the 10th century amirs took power over even the capital. Originally an abstract term for authority, Sulṭān was first used as a title for a ruler by the Seljuk dynasty in the 11th century. Before too long regional rulers of much less power and distinction also used the title until it became the standard title for a monarch claiming to have no superior. One type of ruler not part of the Islamic ideal was the king, which was disparaged in the Quranic mentions of the Pharaoh, "the prototype of the unjust and tyrannical ruler" (18:70, 18:79) and elsewhere (28:34). It was used by the monarch of Egypt and Morocco to indicate their independence from European kings.

==== Separation of powers ====
Practically, for hundreds of years after the fall of the Rāshidūn Caliphate (7th century CE) and until the twentieth century, Islamic states tended to follow a system of government based on the coexistence of sultan and ulama following the rules of the sharia. This system has been compared (by Noah Feldman) to Western governments that possess an unwritten constitution (like the United Kingdom), and that possess separate, countervailing branches of government (like the United States) — which provided Separation of powers in governance. Unlike the three branches of government of the United States (and some other systems of government) — executive, legislative and judicial — Islamic states had two — the sultan and the ulama. Feldman believes a symbol of the success of this system is the current popularity of the Islamist movement which seeks to restore the Islamist state.

Olivier Roy also talks about a de facto separation of religious and non-religious "political power" in Islamic states, though he designates the caliph, not ulama, as the religious power center and the sultans and emirs as the "political power". This division was "created and institutionalized ... as early as the end of the first century of the hegira." No positive law was developed outside of sharia. The sovereign's religious function was to defend the Muslim community against its enemies, institute the sharia, ensure the public good (maslaha). The state was an instrument to enable Muslims to live as good Muslims and Muslims were to obey the sultan if he did so. The legitimacy of the ruler was "symbolized by the right to coin money and to have the Friday prayer (Jumu'ah khutba) said in his name."

According to Feldman, the legislative power of the caliph (or later, the sultan) was always restricted by the scholarly class, the ulama, a group regarded as the guardians of Islamic law. Since the sharia law was established and regulated by the schools of Islamic jurisprudence, this prevented the caliph from dictating legal results. Sharia-compliant rulings were established as authoritative based on the ijma (consensus) of legal Muslim scholars, who theoretically acted as representatives of the entire Ummah (Muslim community). After law colleges (madrasa) became widespread beginning with the 11th and 12th century CE, students of Islamic jurisprudence often had to obtain an ijaza-t al-tadris wa-l-ifta ("license to teach and issue legal opinions") in order to issue valid legal rulings. In many ways, classical Islamic law functioned like a constitutional law.

British lawyer and journalist Sadakat Kadri argues that rather than countering the power of the rulers, a large "degree of deference" was shown to them by the ulama and this was at least at times "counterproductive". During much of the Abbasid caliphate, caliphs were figureheads serving at the mercy of the Sultans, who the ulama also feared:

When Caliph Al-Mutawakkil had been killed in 861, jurists had retroactively validated his murder with a fatwa. Eight years later, they had testified to the lawful abdication of a successor, after he had been dragged from a toilet, beaten unconscious, and thrown into a vault to die. By the middle of the tenth century, judges were solemnly confirming that the onset of blindness had disqualified a caliph, without mentioning that they had just been assembled to witness the gouging of his eyes.

According to Noah Feldman, the Muslim legal scholars and jurists eventually lost their control over Islamic law due to the codification of sharia by the Ottoman Empire in the early 19th century:

How the scholars lost their exalted status as keepers of the law is a complex story, but it can be summed up in the adage that partial reforms are sometimes worse than none at all. In the early 19th century, the Ottoman empire responded to military setbacks with an internal reform movement. The most important reform was the attempt to codify Shariah. This Westernizing process, foreign to the Islamic legal tradition, sought to transform Shariah from a body of doctrines and principles to be discovered by the human efforts of the scholars into a set of rules that could be looked up in a book. [...] Once the law existed in codified form, however, the law itself was able to replace the scholars as the source of authority. Codification took from the scholars their all-important claim to have the final say over the content of the law and transferred that power to the state.

==== Literature ====
Classical Islamic thought (according to Olivier Roy (Note: the French political scientist and professor)) is "overflowing with treatises on governing, advice to sovereigns, and didactic tales", but has little or nothing to say that reflects "on the nature of politics" in general.

Bernard Lewis also writes about an "immense " literature from the classical Islamic age produced by government bureaucrats concerning the "art of government", practical issues in politics and governance, known as adab, and distinct from Islamic jurisprudence, known as fiqh, which also concerns governing.

Lewis finds three major themes in the political literature of jurists and bureaucrats.

1. The choice, appointment and accession of the ruler, who must possess "certain necessary qualifications" specified by Islamic law, must take office by means of "certain procedures", and whose position must be validated by means of some kind of contract. The literature disagreeing to some extent over what the qualifications and procedures are.
2. the obligation owed by the ruler to the subject (to rule justly according to sharia, enjoining good and forbidding evil) and the subject to the ruler (to obey the ruler);
3. the extent and limits of authority and obedience (when obedience to sharia and to the ruler come into conflict, obedience to religion must prevail).

=== Obedience and opposition ===
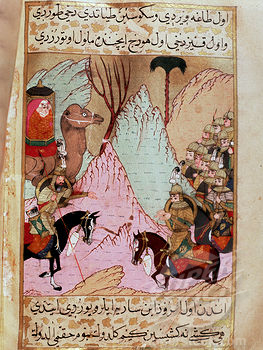
Muhammad's widow, Aisha, battling the fourth caliph Ali

According to scholar Moojan Momen, the verse

- "O believers! Obey God and obey the Apostle and those who have been given authority [uulaa al-amr] among you" (Quran 4:59),

is "one of the key statements in the Qur'an around which much of the exegesis" on the issue of what Islamic doctrine has to say about who should be in charge is based. Bernard Lewis calls the verse (along with related hadith and tafsir) "the starting point" of most Islamic "teaching about politics".

The importance of obedience to rulers has also been emphasized by

- hadith quoting the Prophet saying:
  - "Whoever obeys me has obeyed Allah, and whoever disobeys me has disobeyed Allah; and whoever obeys the leader has obeyed me, and whoever disobeys the leader has disobeyed me";
  - "... He who swears allegiance to a Caliph should give him the pledge of his hand and ... obey him to the best of his capacity. If another man comes forward (as a claimant to Caliphate), disputing his authority, they (the Muslims) should behead the latter. ... ".
- By scholars such as
  - Ibn Taymiyya (1263–1328): "Better a century of tyranny than one day of chaos." (Note: also attributed to Ibn Taymiyya is: "sixty years with an unjust imam is better than one night without a sultan")
  - Al-Ghazālī (1058–1111) wrote similarly: "necessity makes legal what would otherwise not be legal", that any ruler is better than chaos, no matter what the origin of his power. that even an unjust ruler should not be deposed if strife would follow and that the qualifications which the jurists regarded as necessary can be waived if otherwise civil strife would result.

For Sunnīs, the expression "those who have been given authority" (uulaa al-amr) refers to the rulers (caliphs, sultans, kings); for Shīʿa these are usurpers not rulers, and the true authorities are the Imams.

The importance of obedience to political rulers, and the belief that it is duty of the Muslim population to practice piety, prayer, religious rituals, and personal virtue, rather than questioning their authority is known as Quietism.

However, there are also Quranic injunctions to "enjoin good and forbid evil" (al-amr bi-l-maʿrūf wa-n-nahy ʿani-l-munkar, found in Quran 3:104, Quran 3:110, and other verses). Bernard Lewis writes that the Quranic obedience verse (Q.4:59) was

elaborated in a number of sayings attributed to Muhammad. But there are also sayings that put strict limits on the duty of obedience. Two dicta attributed to the Prophet and universally accepted as authentic are indicative. One says, "there is no obedience in sin"; in other words, if the ruler orders something contrary to the divine law, not only is there no duty of obedience, but there is a duty of disobedience. This is more than the right of revolution that appears in Western political thought. It is a duty of revolution, or at least of disobedience and opposition to authority. The other pronouncement, "do not obey a creature against his creator," again clearly limits the authority of the ruler, whatever form of ruler that may be.

Ibn Taymiyya also interprets "there is no obedience in sin" to mean that Muslims should ignore the order of the ruler if it would disobey the divine law. However, they should not use this as excuse for revolution because violence would mean the spilling of Muslim blood. Ibn Ḥazm (994–1064) also agreed with total obedience unless the Quran or Sunnī population are violated, but asserts that an authority who does violate them should be prevented, punished and if that cannot be done, removed. (Note: Author Jebran Chamieh notes that with no mechanism, no legal authority to determine when divine law has been violated, these principles are of limited use.)

=== Sharia and governance (siyasa) ===
Starting from the late medieval period, Sunni fiqh elaborated the doctrine of siyasa shar'iyya, which literally means governance according to sharia, and is sometimes called the political dimension of Islamic law. Its goal was to harmonize Islamic law with the practical demands of statecraft, on the grounds that non-formalist application of Islamic law was sometimes required by expedience and utilitarian considerations (Islamic law rejected circumstantial evidence, for example). The doctrine created exceptions to the use of qadi courts and their strict sharia enforcement, including mazalim courts administered by the ruler's council that applied "corrective" discretionary punishments for petty offenses; their jurisdiction was expanded under the Mamluk Sultanate, to commercial and family law; broader use of Maslaha (public interest) as a basis of Islamic law—the Ottoman rulers promulgating a body of administrative, criminal, and economic laws known as qanun.

=== Shīʿa tradition ===
Shīʿa Muslims, who believe that ʿAlī ibn Abī Ṭālib and his descendants (Imams) should have been the leaders of the Muslim community, evolved from a political party to a religious sect after the massacre of Ali's son Husayn and his followers by an Umayyad force at Karbala in 680 CE. The tragedy of the event — with its themes of "martyrdom and persecution ... sacrifice, guilt and expiation" around the suffering of those killed, wickedness of those who did the killing, the penitence of those who failed save the victims — are commemorated annually by Shia. Along with their status through the centuries as religious minorities under rulers they regard as usurpers, this created a difference not only in outlook but in "political attitudes and behavior" from the Sunni.

While there have been several Shi'i dynasties over the course of Islamic history, with a short exception of Ali's rule, the Shi'i Imam's never ruled. (In the largest Shi'i sect, Twelvers, the last Imam—Muḥammad al-Mahdī al-Ḥujjah—went into occultation", i.e. disappeared in 878.) Consequently, in Shīʿa Islam, the attitude towards non-Imam rulers (i.e. what Shia considered usurpers) tended towards three approaches — political cooperation with the ruler, political activism challenging the ruler, and aloofness from politics. The "writings of Shi'i ulama through the ages" showed "elements of all three of these attitudes."

=== Kharijite tradition ===
Islamic extremism dates back to the early history of Islam with the emergence of the Kharijites in the 7th century CE. The Kharijites broke away from both the Shīʿa and the Sunnīs during the First Fitna (the first Islamic Civil War); they were particularly noted for adopting a radical approach to takfīr (excommunication), whereby they declared both Sunnī and Shīʿa Muslims to be either infidels (kuffār) or false Muslims (munāfiḳūn), and therefore deemed them worthy of death for their perceived apostasy (ridda).

The Islamic tradition traces the origin of the Kharijites to the battle between ʿAlī and Muʿāwiya at Siffin in 657 CE. When ʿAlī was faced with a military stalemate and agreed to submit the dispute to arbitration, some of his party withdrew their support from him. "Judgement belongs to God alone" (لاَ حُكْكْ إلَا لِلّهِ) became the slogan of these secessionists. (Kharijites believing the victor in combat would be God's choice.) They also called themselves al-Shurat ("the Vendors"), to reflect their willingness to sell their lives in martyrdom.

The original Kharijites opposed both ʿAlī and Muʿāwiya, and appointed their own leaders. They were decisively defeated by ʿAlī, who was in turn assassinated by a Kharijite. They engaged in guerrilla warfare against the Umayyads, but only became a movement to be reckoned with during the Second Fitna (the second Islamic Civil War) when they at one point controlled more territory than any of their rivals. The Kharijites were, in fact, one of the major threats to ʿAbd Allāh bin al-Zubayr's bid for the caliphate; during this time they controlled the central region of Yamama and most of Southern Arabia, and captured the oasis town of al-Ṭāʾif.

The Azāriḳa, an extremist faction of the Kharijites founded by Nāfiʿ bin al-Azraḳ al-Ḥanafī al-Ḥanẓalī in Basra (683 CE), controlled parts of Western Iran under the Umayyads until they were finally overthrown in 699 CE. According to al-Ashʿarī, their leader Nāfiʿ bin al-Azraḳ was the first to cause disputes among the Kharijites by supporting the thesis according to which all adversaries should be put to death together with their women and children (istiʿrāḍ). Because of their readiness to declare any opponent as apostate, the Kharijite movement was divided and started to fragment into smaller groups, from which the Ibāḍites derived. The more moderate Ibāḍi Kharijites were longer-lived, continuing to wield political power in North and East Africa, and in Eastern Arabia during the Abbasid period, and are the only Kharijite group to survive into modern times.

By the time that Ibn al-Muqaffa' wrote his political treatise early in the Abbasid period, the Kharijites were no longer a significant political threat, at least in the Islamic heartlands. The memory of the menace they had posed to Muslim unity and of the moral challenge generated by their pious idealism still weighed heavily on Muslim political and religious thought, however. Even if the Kharijites could no longer threaten, their ghosts still had to be answered.

== Modern era ==
From the 16th to the 20th centuries the Muslim world felt the external impact of European colonialism that brought a new era. Unlike the 7th century Byzantine Greeks and Sasanian Persians, the 18th and 19th century British, French, Russian, etc. were conquerors, and unlike the medieval Turks and Mongols that had also conquered large areas of Muslim land, the Europeans had little interest in conversion to Islam or adopting Muslim ways.

=== Early modern empires (15th–16th centuries) ===
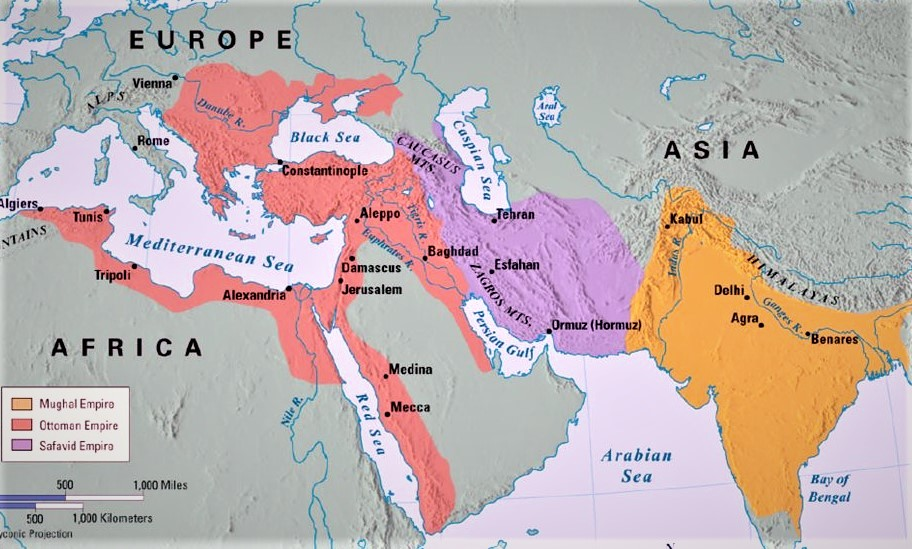
Map of the Gunpowder empires

In the early modern period between 1453 and 1526, three major states were founded by Muslim dynastic monarchies—in the Mediterranean (Ottoman), Iran (Safavid), and South Asia (Mughal). They were known as the Gunpowder empires for their use and development of the newly invented firearms, especially cannon and small arms, which allow them to expand and centralize their empires. By the early 17th century, the descendants of their founders controlled much of the Muslim world, stretching from the Balkans and North Africa to the Bay of Bengal, with a combined population estimated at between 130 and 160 million.

The empires all benefited from alliances between rulers and religious officials. Ottoman rulers relied on Islamic judges (qāḍī) and assumed the title of caliph (within the borders of their empire) in the 14th century. After their conquest of Mamluk Egypt in 1517, they gained control of the cities of Mecca (the birthplace of Islam and site of the Ḥajj pilgrimage) and Medina. Abolishing the Mamluk-controlled Abbasid Caliphate, the Ottoman sultans declared themselves to be protectors of the two holy cities and expanded their claim to caliphate to the entire Muslim world. The Safavid Shāh Ismā'īl I established the Twelver Shīʿa Islam as the official religion of the newly-founded Persian Empire. The Muslim Mughal dynasty ruled a majority-Hindu population along with smaller religious minorities, and were necessarily tolerant of other faiths.

=== Ottoman expansionism and imperialism ===
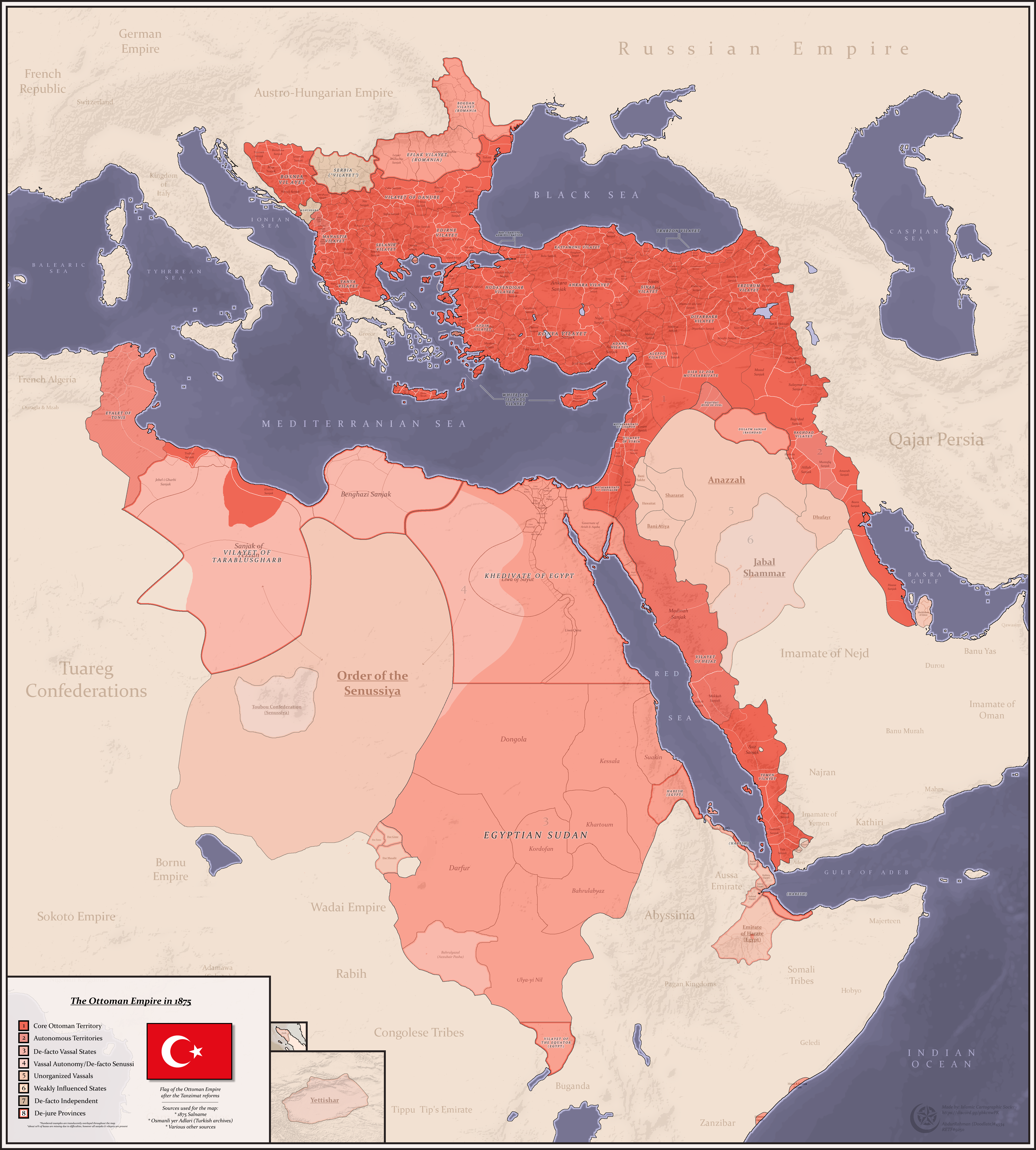
Territorial extent of the Ottoman Empire in 1875, right before the Great Eastern Crisis

Islam, unlike other religions, began not persecuted or struggling but conquering, growing from strength to strength; within less than a century of its founding it had become an empire spanning from the Pyrenees Mountains and Atlantic Ocean to the borders of the Chinese Empire and Medieval India. Much of the territory it gained (the Balkans, North Africa, and the Levant) came from the land of an older, related Abrahamic religion to the north, i.e. Christianity. For most of Islamic history, which covers the Medieval period entirely, Christendom was poorer and less sophisticated; its attempts to gain back lost territory from the Muslim world mostly unsuccessful for many centuries. (Note: The Crusades of the Holyland ended with decisive defeat, although the Reconquista of the Christian kingdoms of Spain and Portugal in the 15th century, restored the Christian rule on the Iberian Peninsula under the Catholic Monarchs (Los Reyes Católicos).)

The Ottoman Empire began its expansion into Europe by invading the European portions of the Byzantine Empire in the 14th and 15th centuries up until the capture of Constantinople in 1453, establishing Islam as the state religion of the newly-founded empire. The Ottoman Turks further expanded into Southeastern Europe and consolidated their political power by invading and conquering huge portions of the Serbian Empire, Bulgarian Empire, and the remaining territories of the Byzantine Empire in the 14th and 15th centuries. The empire reached its xenith of territorial expansion in Europe in the 16th century. The slave trade in the Ottoman Empire supplied the ranks of the Ottoman army between the 15th and 19th centuries. They were useful in preventing both the slave rebellions and the breakup of the Empire itself, especially due to the rising tide of nationalism among European peoples in its Balkan provinces from the 17th century onwards. Along with the Balkans, the Black Sea Region remained a significant source of high-value slaves for the Ottoman Turks.

European kingdoms began establishing embassies and diplomatic missions to the Ottoman Empire between the 15th and 16th centuries in order to create closer, and more friendly, relationships with the Ottoman Turks (see also: Franco-Ottoman alliance).

==== Ottoman and Muslim decline ====
The fear of Ottoman expansion and its implications on religion in Europe finally dissipated by the 17th century. Starting in the second half of the 17th century, with the end of the Battle of Vienna and the Treaty of Karlowitz (1699), this changed; Ottoman rule started to decline in Southeastern Europe. Ottoman expansionism ended with their defeat in the Great Turkish War (1683–1699). The Ottoman Empire, for centuries the mightiest Muslim state and referred to as the "cruel Turk" among Europeans, now was looked down upon by the other European countries as the "Sick man of Europe", as it was widely held that the Ottoman Empire was a stagnant nation and incapable of modernizing. During the last hundred years of the Ottoman Empire it gradually lost almost all of its European territories, until it was defeated and eventually collapsed in 1922.

The other two Muslim gunpowder empires also retreated before Europe and advance. The Mughal Empire in India fell (1857), Russia made incursions into the Caucasus (1828), and Central Asia (1830-1895). By the 19th and early 20th centuries, European Great Powers had “annexed or occupied much of the Middle East and penetrated or influenced the rest.“ This included the French conquest of Algeria (1830). as well. The First World War brought the defeat and dismemberment of the Ottoman Empire, to which the Ottoman officer and Turkish revolutionary statesman Mustafa Kemal Atatürk had an instrumental role in ending and replacing it with the Republic of Turkey, a modern, secular democracy (see also: Abolition of the Caliphate, Abolition of the Ottoman sultanate, Kemalism, and Secularism in Turkey). In order to explain its downfall, the Ottoman decline thesis was used throughout most of the 20th century as the basis of both Western and Republican Turkish understanding of Ottoman history. However, by 1978, historians had begun to reexamine the fundamental assumptions of the Ottoman decline thesis.

In addition to military advances, the economic development and worldwide colonization and exploration of Europeans and westerners meant their merchants had a vast array of products and commodities from across the world to sell to Muslims—including products (sugar, coffee, paper) that had originally been Muslim export products but that Westerners could now grow more cheaply in their colonies. Furthermore, the middlemen handling and profiting from the new western imports were usually not Muslims but foreigners or religious minorities (usually Christians), “seen and treated” as marginal. After World War II, colonies in Africa and Asia were freed but the new decolonized states were fragmented, no longer empires, and Western economic influence remained, and went well beyond commodities.

=== Reaction to European colonialism ===
The fight for Islamic resurgence against Western encroachment might be divided into two contrasting approaches: meeting the enemy on its own terms and fighting "him with his own weapons", on the battlefield, in politics and in general by "modernizing". Or alternately with religious revival, since Islam is by definition superior to all faiths, failures and defeats in the temporal world must mean that those defeated Muslims are practicing authentic Islam and their states are not authentic Islamic states. Muslims must then return to the pure authentic Islam of the Prophet Muhammad and his Companions, discarding innovations and accretions to achieve victory over disbelievers.

The first Muslim reaction to European colonization was of "peasant and religious", not urban origin. "Charismatic leaders", generally members of the ulama or leaders of religious orders, launched the call for jihad and formed tribal coalitions. Islamic law (sharīʿa), in defiance of local common law, was imposed to unify tribes. Examples include Abd al-Qadir in Algeria, Muhammad Ahmad in Sudan, Shamil in the Caucasus, the Senussi in Libya and Chad, Mullah-i Lang in Afghanistan, the Akhund of Swat in India, and later, Abd al-Karim in Morocco. Despite "spectacular victories" such as the annihilation of the British army in Afghanistan in 1842 and the taking of Kharoum in 1885, all these movements eventually failed

The second Muslim reaction to European encroachment later in the century and early 20th century was not violent resistance but the adoption of some Western political, social, cultural and technological ways. Members of the urban elite, particularly in Egypt, Iran, and Turkey, advocated and practiced "Westernization". The failure of the attempts at political Westernization, according to some, was exemplified by the Tanzimat reorganization of the Ottoman state. Islamic law (sharīʿa) was codified into civil law (which was called the Mecelle) and an elected legislature was established to make law. These steps took away the ulama's role of "discovering" the law and the formerly powerful scholar class weakened and withered into religious functionaries, while the legislature was suspended less than a year after its inauguration and never recovered to replace the ulama as a separate "branch" of government providing separation of powers. The "paradigm of the executive as a force unchecked by either the sharia of the scholars or the popular authority of an elected legislature became the dominant paradigm in most of the Sunni Muslim world in the 20th century."

==== Pan-Islamism ====
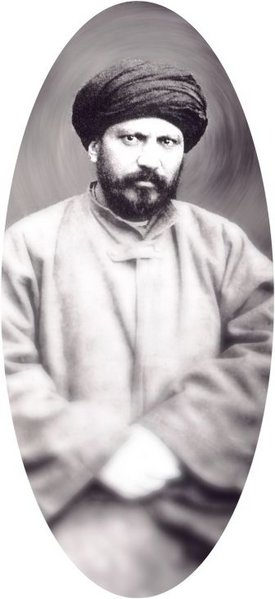
Jamal al-Din al-Afghani

Pan-Islamism (in the sense of "Islamic unity or at least cooperation") was promoted in the Ottoman Empire during the last quarter of the 19th century by the Ottoman sultan Abdul Hamid II for the purpose of preventing secession movements of the Muslim peoples within the empire's territories and mobilizing Muslim opinion in support of "the faltering Ottoman state". The claim that the head of the last Muslim state of any size and power independent of Europe was "the head of all Islam", (Note: a claim formally made in the first Ottoman construction of 1876.)) served as a rallying point for Sunni Muslims until the 1924 abolition of the Ottoman caliphate.

===== Early movement leaders =====
The major leaders of the Pan-Islamist movement were the triad of Jamal al-Din Afghani (1839–1897), Muhammad Abduh (1849–1905), and Sayyid Rashid Rida (1865–1935). All were active in anti-colonial efforts to confront European penetration of Muslim lands, believed Islamic unity to be the strongest force to mobilize Muslims against imperial domination.

Jamal al-Din al-Afghani (who was actually from Iran, not Afghanistan, and brought up Shīʿa, not Sunnī) was an Islamic political activist who travelled throughout the Muslim world during the late 19th century urging pan-Islamic unity in colonial India against the British Empire. Al-Afghani's ideology has been described as a welding of "traditional" religious antipathy toward non-Muslims "to a modern critique of Western imperialism and an appeal for the unity of Islam", urging the adoption of Western sciences and institutions that might strengthen Islam. He was thought to not have any deep faith in Islam, nor in a constitutional government—which he doubted was a viable political alternative in the Islamic world—but was very interested in the overthrow of any Muslim rulers he saw as lax and/or subservient and their replacement with ones who were strong and patriotic.

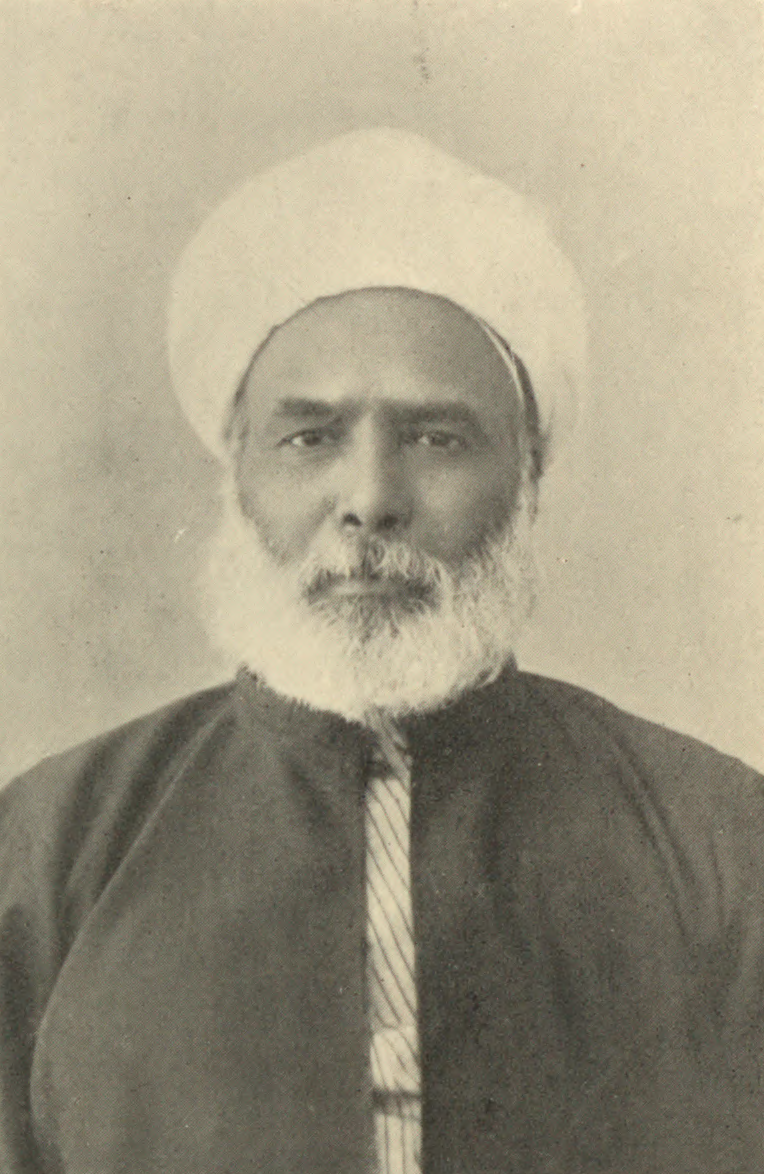
Muhammad Abduh

Muhammad Abduh, an Egyptian Islamic scholar, judge, and Grand Mufti of Egypt, was a central figure of the Arab Nahḍa (awakening), and Islamic Modernism in the late 19th and early 20th centuries. Twice exiled by the British, he was a devoted follower of Al-Afghani, he helped publish a newspaper in Paris with him calling for a return to the original principles and ideals of Islam, and greater unity among Islamic peoples. As a qāḍī in Egypt, he was involved in many decisions, some of which were considered quite liberal, such as calling for Muslims to accept interest on loans and meat butchered by non-Muslims. He promoted both religious and scientific education.

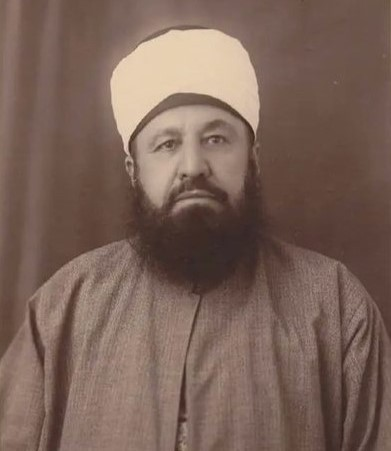
Rashid Rida

Islamic jurist Muhammad Rashid Rida—a student of Abduh and Afghani—positioned himself as the successor to those two pan-Islamists and anti colonialists. He called for a unified Islam based on revival of the Islamic caliphate led by Arabs and the reformation of Muslims. Inspired by stories of the purity of the early eras of Muhammad and the Rashidun, he was more interested in Wahhabism than modernism, and preached for a puritanical Islam where Islamic law (sharīʿa) was implemented. According to Rida, the state-sponsored scholars neglected the revival of early Islamic traditions in the Muslim community (Ummah). His influential Islamic journal Al-Manār promoted anti-British revolt, as well as Islamic revivalism based on the tenets of Salafism (Salafiyya).

===== Caliph claimants =====
The era between World War I and World War II was perhaps the nadir of Islamic power. The Ottoman caliphate had been abolished by the Grand National Assembly of Turkey in 1924 (see Atatürk's reforms), and only two Muslim-majority countries were "genuinely independent"—Iran and Turkey. But rather than providing a model of Islamic independence, both of these country's rulers—Reza Shah and Mustafa Kemal Atatürk, respectively—were secular, nationalist, modernizing, Westernizing. Into the void left by came a succession of claimants to the caliphate—Hussein bin Ali, King of Hejaz in 1924, King Abdulaziz bin Abdul Rahman Ibn Saud in 1926 (both in Arabia), King Fuad in 1926, and King Faruq "at various times" (both in Egypt).

===== Hussein bin Ali =====
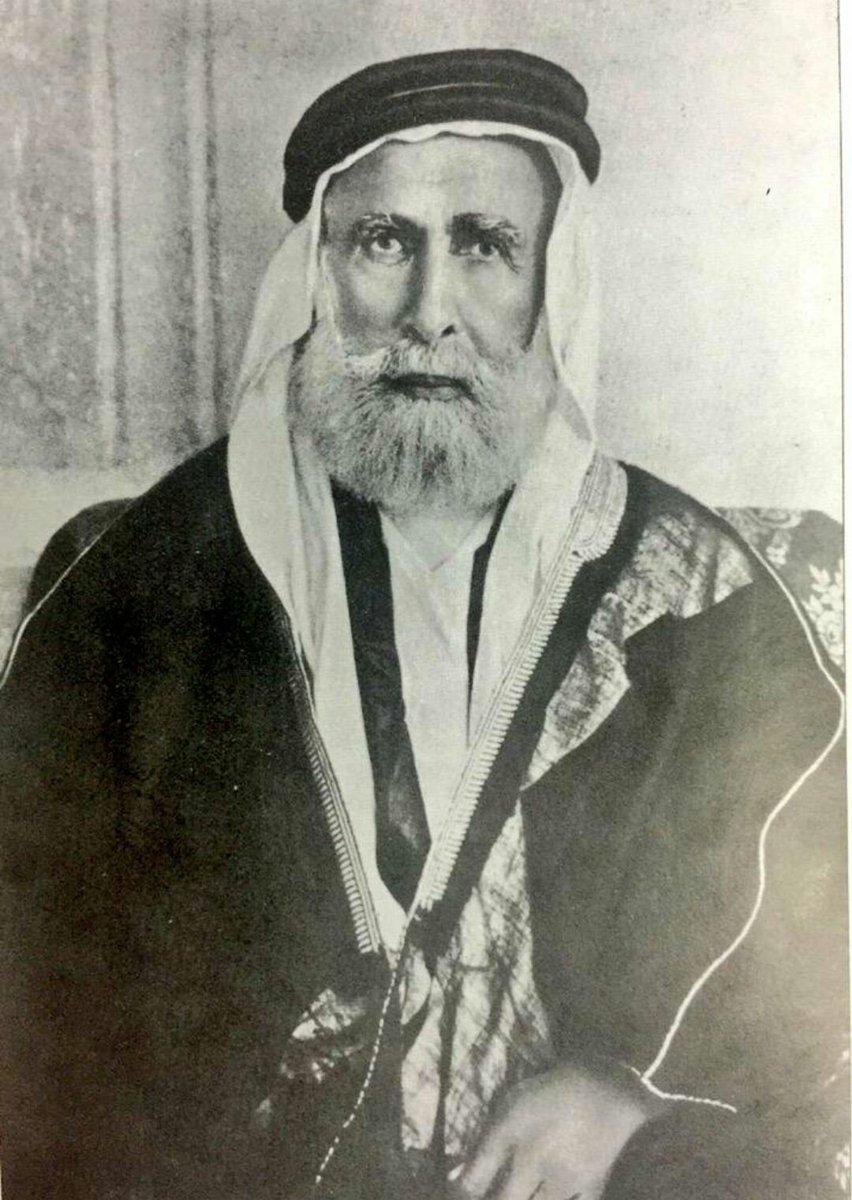
Hussein bin Ali

Hussein bin Ali, the Sharif and Emir of Mecca from 1908-1924, enthroned himself as King of the Hejaz after proclaiming the Great Arab Revolt against the Ottoman Empire, and continued to hold both of the offices of Sharif and King from 1916 to 1924. At the end of his reign he also briefly laid claim to the office of Sharifian Caliph; he was a 37th-generation direct descendant of Muhammad, as he belongs to the Hashemite family. In 1916, with the promise of British support for Arab independence, he proclaimed the Great Arab Revolt against the Ottoman Empire, accusing the Committee of Union and Progress of violating tenets of Islam and limiting the power of the sultan-caliph. Shortly after the outbreak of the revolt, Hussein declared himself "King of the Arab Countries". However, his pan-Arab aspirations were not accepted by the Allies, who recognized him only as King of the Hejaz. In the aftermath of World War I, Hussein refused to ratify the Treaty of Versailles, in protest at the Balfour Declaration and the establishment of British and French mandates in Syria, Iraq, and Palestine. He later refused to sign the Anglo-Hashemite Treaty and thus deprived himself of British support when his kingdom was attacked by Ibn Saud. After the Kingdom of Hejaz was invaded by the Al Saud-Wahhabi armies of the Ikhwan, on 23 December 1925 King Hussein bin Ali surrendered to the Saudis, bringing both the Kingdom of Hejaz and the Sharifate of Mecca to an end.

==== Political Islam movement leaders ====
Following World War I, the defeat and dissolution of the Ottoman Empire, and the subsequent abolition of the Caliphate by the Turkish nationalist and revolutionary Mustafa Kemal Atatürk, founder of the modern Republic of Turkey, many Muslims perceived that the political power of their religion was in retreat. There was also concern that Western ideas and influence were spreading throughout Muslim societies due to Western colonialism; this led to considerable resentment of the influence of the European powers. The Muslim Brotherhood emerged in the Kingdom of Egypt as a politico-religious movement aimed to resist British colonial efforts and oppose Western cultural influence in the MENA region.

Following Jamal al-Din Afghani, Muhammad Abduh, and Sayyid Rashid Rida were Sunni Islamist thinkers/leaders Egyptian Muslim Brotherhood leader Hasan al-Banna, Brotherhood editor author Sayyid Qutb and Indian journalist and politician Abul A'la Maududi who sought Muslim strength and unity under sharia law.

Al-Banna emphasised that "Islam considers the government one of its pillars and relies on enforcement as much as on persuasion. ... The Prophet made 'government' one of the essential bonds of Islam and it is viewed in our books of jurisprudence as a part of the doctrine osul (fundamental) and not as a subsidiary foru. Islam consists of rule and execution, as well as of legislation and preaching. Neither part can be separated from the other." Qutb and Maududi followed the rejectionist Islamic view of Muhammad Rashid Rida, condemning imitation of foreign ideas, including Western democracy, which they distinguished from the Islamic doctrine of shura (consultation between ruler and ruled). This perspective, which stresses comprehensive implementation of sharia, was widespread in the 1970s and 1980s among various movements seeking to establish an Islamic state, but its popularity has diminished in recent years.

Nostalgia for the days of successful Islamic empires simmering under later Western colonialism played a major role in the Islamist political ideal of the Islamic state, a state in which Islamic law is preeminent. The Islamist political program generally begins by re-shaping the governments of existing Muslim nation-states; but the means of doing this varies greatly across movements and circumstances. Many political Islamist movements, such as the Jamaat-e-Islami and Muslim Brotherhood, focus on vote-getting and coalition-building with other political parties.

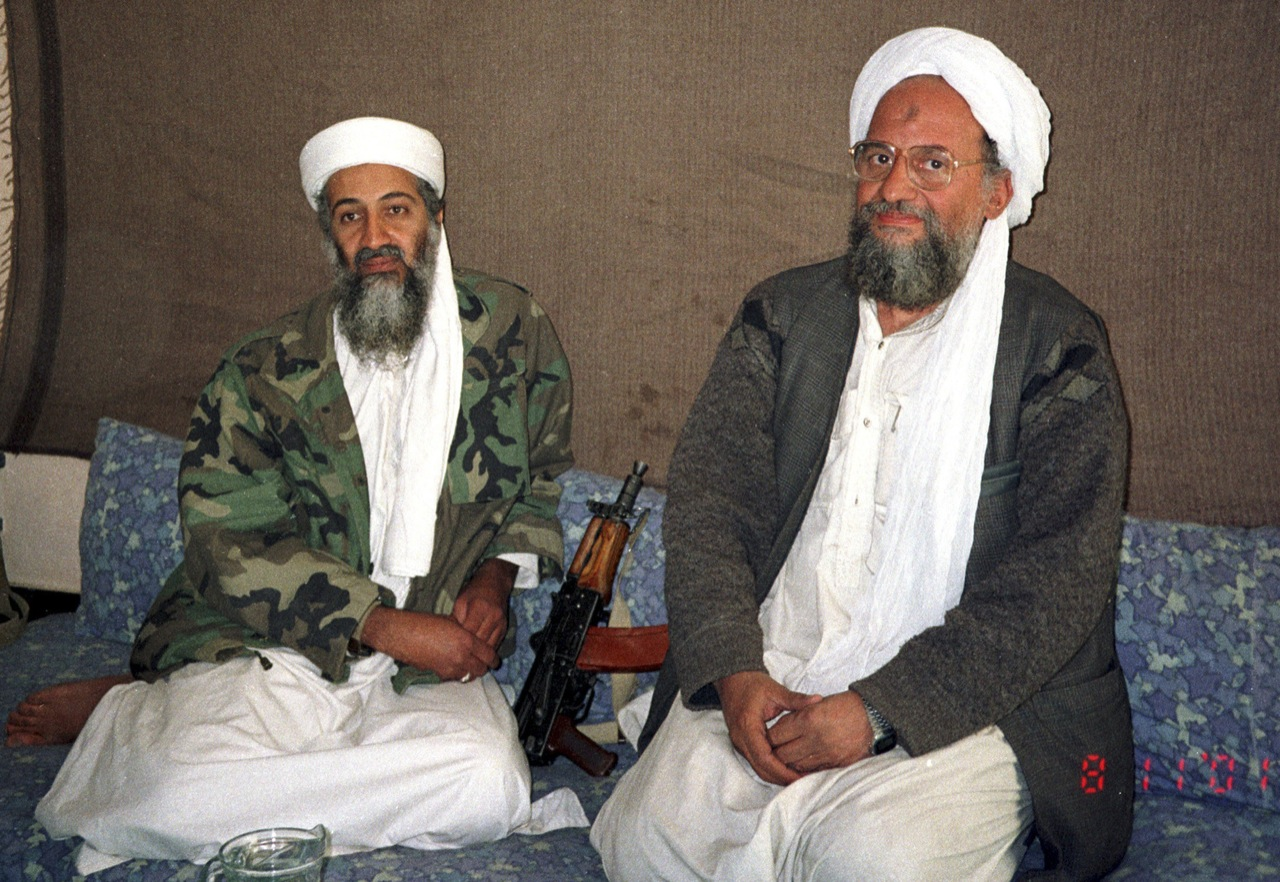
Osama bin Laden and Ayman al-Zawahiri of al-Qaeda have promoted the overthrow of secular governments.

Sayyid Qutb, an Egyptian Islamist ideologue and prominent figurehead of the Muslim Brotherhood in Egypt, was influential in promoting the pan-Islamist ideology in the 1960s. When he was executed by the Egyptian government under the regime of Gamal Abdel Nasser, Ayman al-Zawahiri formed the organization Egyptian Islamic Jihad to replace the government with an Islamic state that would reflect Qutb's ideas for the Islamic revival that he yearned for. The Qutbist ideology has been influential on jihadist movements and Islamic terrorists that seek to overthrow secular governments, most notably Osama bin Laden and Ayman al-Zawahiri of al-Qaeda, as well as the Salafi-jihadi terrorist group ISIL/ISIS/IS/Daesh. Moreover, Qutb's books have been frequently been cited by Osama bin Laden and Anwar al-Awlaki.

Sayyid Qutb could be said to have founded the actual movement of radical Islam. Radical Islamic movements such as al-Qaeda and the Taliban embrace the militant Islamist ideology, and were prominent for being part of the anti-Soviet resistance in Afghanistan during the 1980s. Both of the aforementioned militant Islamist groups had a role to play in the September 11 terrorist attacks in 2001, presenting both "near" and "far" enemies as regional governments and the United States respectively. They also took part in the bombings in Madrid in 2004 and London in 2005. The recruits often came from the ranks of jihadists, from Egypt, Algeria, Saudi Arabia, and Morocco.

Jihadism has been defined otherwise as a neologism for militant, predominantly Sunnī Islamic movements that use ideologically-motivated violence to defend the Ummah (the collective Muslim world) from foreign Non-Muslims and those that they perceive as domestic infidels. The term "jihadist globalism" is also often used in relation to Islamic terrorism as a globalist ideology, and more broadly to the war on terror. The Austrian-American academic Manfred B. Steger, Professor of Sociology at the University of Hawaiʻi at Mānoa, proposed an extension of the term "jihadist globalism" to apply to all extremely violent strains of religiously influenced ideologies that articulate the global imaginary into concrete political agendas and terrorist strategies; these include al-Qaeda, Jemaah Islamiyah, Hamas, and Hezbollah, which he finds "today's most spectacular manifestation of religious globalism".

===== Ibn Saud and Wahhabism =====
Following Ibn Saud's conquest of the Arabian Peninsula, pan-Islamism would be bolstered across the Islamic world. During the second half of the 20th century, pan-Islamists competed against left-wing nationalist ideologies in the Arab world such as Nasserism and Ba'athism. At the height of the Cold War in the 1960s and 1970s, Saudi Arabia and allied countries in the Muslim world led the Pan-Islamist struggle to fight the spread of communist ideology and curtail the rising Soviet influence in the world.

As Saudi Arabia became an enormously wealthy petroleum exporter, it used its funds to propagate the Wahhabi school of Islam through the Muslim world, spending over $75 billion from 1982 to 2005 via international organizations such as Muslim World League, the World Assembly of Muslim Youth, the International Islamic Relief Organization, etc. (Note: various royal charities) Led by Prince Salman bin Abdul-Aziz, Minister of Defense at the time, who became king in January 2015. and religious attaches at dozens of Saudi embassies,) to establish/build 200 Islamic colleges, 210 Islamic centers, 1,500 mosques, and 2,000 schools for Muslim children in Muslim and Non-Muslim majority countries. Mosque funding was combined with persuasion to propagate the dawah Salafiyya; schools were "fundamentalist" in outlook and formed a network "from Sudan to northern Pakistan". Supporting proselytizing or preaching of Islam (Note: dawah (literally "making an invitation" to Islam)) has been called "a religious requirement" for Saudi rulers that cannot [or could not] be abandoned "without losing their domestic legitimacy" as protectors and propagators of Islam.

==== Pan-Islam, Inter-Islamic conferences and religious protest ====
The first attempt at an inter-Islamic conference began in the later 19th century and "led nowhere". In the post World War II era, an informal bloc of Muslim countries worked together sometimes at the United Nations. In 1954 a conference was convened in Mecca under President Gamal Abdel Nasser of Egypt but was also unsuccessful. A permanent, inter-Islamic body was successfully initiated in 1969, in 1971 the "Organisation of Islamic Cooperation" (now called the Organization of the Islamic Conference) was "first mooted", and in 1974 a summit conference was held at Lahore Pakistan. As of the 1990s it had a permanent headquarters, a secretariat, and a number of subsidiary bodies, and was involved in religious, cultural, and economic matters. But on "politics or even diplomacy" it had "remarkably" little impact.

While international pan-Islamic cooperation has gone much further than anything like it in the Christian world, an example of how the limited its results have been (according to historian Bernard Lewis), was the failure of Muslim states to unite in opposition to the 1979-1989 Soviet invasion of Afghanistan. Despite the aggression of the Soviets in crossing an international border into a Muslim country, executing its leader, and causing considerable death and destruction among the civilian population, the best that Muslim states working together could accomplish (thanks to the lobbying by Soviet allies the PLO, Syria, Algeria, Libya, etc.), were mildly worded resolutions passed at international conferences and the United Nations General Assembly, "requesting" that "foreign troops" (the Soviets were never mentioned by name) leave the country. (Individual Muslims Muslim states were more assertive in aiding the Afghan population.)

Lewis argues that the true power of Islamic religiosity is found not in Pan-Islamism but in spontaneous movements within countries, two examples being the resistance to irreligious moves by Muslim state leaders. Tunisian President Habib Bourguiba announced in 1960 that the loss of work and production during the month long Ramadān fast was a luxury that an underdeveloped country like Tunisia could not afford. Since fasting is suspended during jihad, he called for a "jihad" (i.e. struggle) to "obtain economic independence by development". Bourguiba was unable to obtain a fatwa from a religious leader for his "jihad", and the overwhelming majority of Tunisians ignored it in favor of the Ramadān fast. Another failure of a Muslim majority state to move pious Muslims away from religion was the reaction to an article in the Syrian official army weekly Jaysh al-Sha'b in April 1967. It called for the formation of a "new Arab Socialist Man" who in the building of the new Arab civilization would dismiss not only capitalism and feudalism but religion and belief in heaven and hell. While prior to this the Syrian population had submitted to the authoritarian government's radical changes and abolition of constitutional rights, the article led to strikes and protests of tens of thousands. Unable to quell the uprising with force, the government felt compelled to confiscate all copies of the journal issue, blame the article on an "American-Israeli" conspiracy, and sentence the author to life in prison.

==== Competition with nationalism and the political left ====
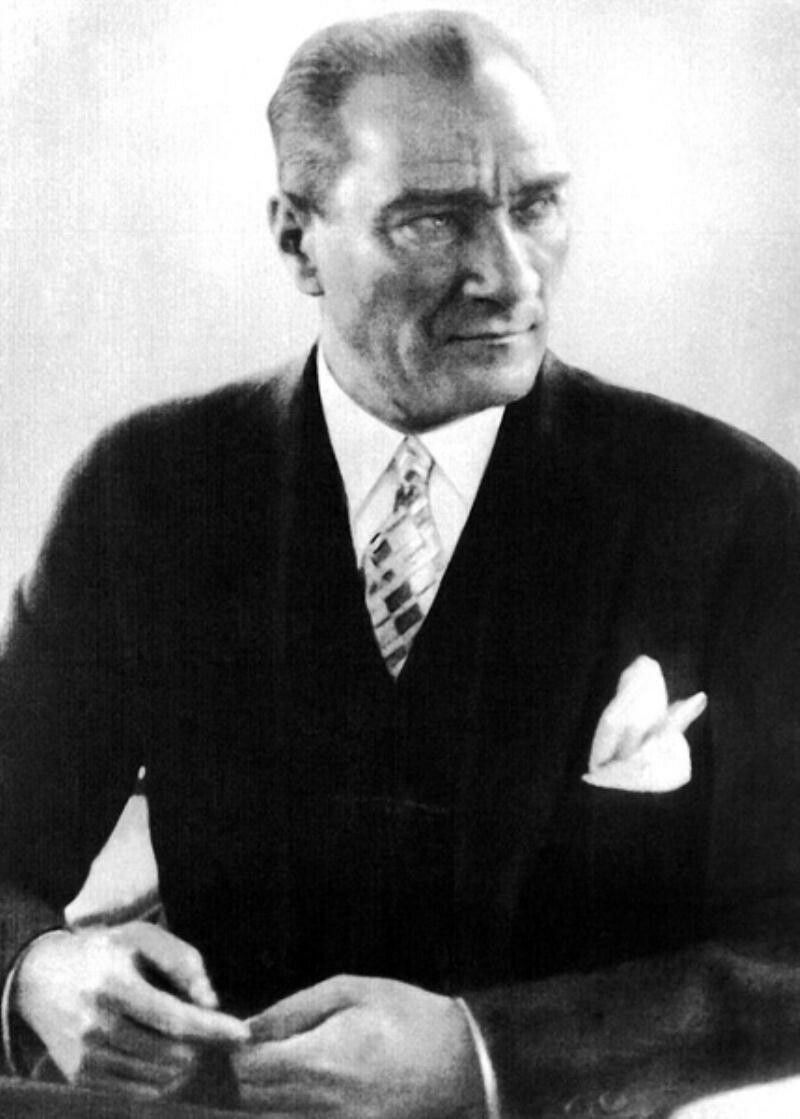
Mustafa Kemal Atatürk, the founding father of the Republic of Turkey, serving as its first president from 1923 until his death in 1938. He undertook sweeping progressive reforms, which modernized Turkey into a secular, industrializing nation.

Ideologies coming from Europe that had for a time influence in the Muslim world included patriotism and liberalism in the 19th century. In the 1920, when Kemal Atatürk won the first major Muslim victory against a Christian power for centuries, defeating the Greeks and "facing down the mighty British Empire", he went on to secularize his country, converting what was left of the Ottoman Empire into the Turkish Republic, abolishing the caliphate, replacing sharia law, with a modified version of the Swiss Civil Code, the Arabic script with the Latin script, and adopting a range of European practices, Westernizing his country. At first Atatürk's victory resounded throughout the Muslim world, though he was later reviled as a "traitor" by Islamists.

Arabism as a "common nationality" was first launched in the "late 19th and early 20th centuries". In the 1920s and 30s "nationalist leaders still dominated the political scene" in Muslim countries, and nationalist discourse alone was heard in public debate".

However, with patriotism's fragmentation and liberalism's failure, others replaced them—fascism in the 1930s, communism from the 1950s to the 1980.

Between the 1950s and the 1960s, the predominant ideology within the Arab world was pan-Arabism, which de-emphasized religion and encouraged the creation of socialist, secular states based on Arab nationalist ideologies such as Nasserism and Baathism rather than Islam, and called for a unified (very large) Arab state. Increasingly, the borders of these states were seen as artificial colonial creations - which they were, having literally been drawn on a map by European colonial powers.

Coups that overthrew conservative regimes, (usually monarchies), establishing revolutionary republican governments (nationalist and/or leftist) occurred in several Arab countries—Egypt (1952), Iraq (1958), North Yemen (1962) and Libya (1969).

However, governments based on Arab nationalism have found themselves facing economic stagnation and disorder. The quick and decisive defeat of the Arab countries (who had pledged to annihilated Israel) in the 1967 Arab-Israeli Six-Day War, "seriously undermined the ideological edifice" of Arab nationalism. Few years later the Islamist philosophy—hitherto confined to small circles of Muslim Brothers—came into this political vacuum.

By the 1990s, the secular ideologies of "liberalism, nationalism, capitalism, socialism, communism" had "failed utterly" to resolve the problems of the Muslim world (according to Bernard Lewis); and in the realm of political dissent in Muslim society, "from Cairo to Tehran, the crowds that in the 1950s demonstrated" against colonialism, and imperialism, were now simply anti-Westernism, and marched beneath the green banner of Islam, no longer "the red or national flag" (according to Olivier Roy). Atatürk's secularism was in retreat in Turkey.

==== Opposition to political Islam ====
Dissenting from the orthodoxy that the Quran, Muhammad or the Rashidun had much to say about governance (or that Shura is a "pillar of Islam"), are some Islamic Modernists.

Taha Hussein (1889-1973) writes:

Government in the time of the Prophet was not delegated from heaven in its details; people were left free to manage their affairs as they wish within the limits of fairness and justice. Furthermore, the Quran did not propose, in general terms or in detail, a political system, and the Prophet did not indicate who should be his successor either orally or in written form.

Jebran Chamieh also argues that while it is true Muhammad exercised the executive power, commanded armies, controlled the finances and revenues, made legal judgements, he created no organized system for these functions.

"Moreover, the Prophet had ample time before his death to organize the Moslem community politically. The most pressing measure was to establish a system for the legal transmission of power. He was aware of the rivalry among his followers over the succession and could have delegated his authority to prevent dissensions among them. But he did not. These observations lend credence to those who argue that the Prophet never intended to form a state and that his mission was purely religious."

Chamieh also points out that this practice (or lack thereof) was followed by the Rashidun caliphate, who never established a "police force to keep law and order". When "the rebels attacked Caliph Othman in his house and assassinated him, no security measures were available to protect him. The caliphs did not establish an administration, a fiscal system, or a budget ... In the conquered lands, they retained the previous Byzantine and Persian administrative systems and kept the local employees to administer the country."

Jebran Chemiah also notes that the two general comments on shura in the Quran say nothing further than that it is a good practice. The modality of the process, when, where and how shura should be used, whether the advise given must be followed, is not explained. Hadith, where obscure Quranic references are often explained when a theme from the Quran is thought worthy of explaining, say little or nothing. There is no evidence Muhammad held regular shura meetings with companions or ever felt their advice was binding on him when they gave it. (Note: As for the people who are to be consulted in shura -- Ahl al-Hal Wal 'Aqd -- Chemiah notes they have been given a name but not criteria for choosing them. He quotes Islamic jurist Zafer Qasemi of Damascus: "This was an Islamic constitutional invention for which I could not find an explicit text in the Quran or sunna. For that reason, the expression remained a hypothetical speculation discussed by jurists, and transmitted from one generation to the next, with no impact on Islamic political life. I have searched in vain for the origin of this expression, but could not find who first proclaimed, or used it. I am certain that because this principle was never used, it remained theoretical and ambiguous.")

==== Islamic political theories ====
Muslih and Browers identify three major Islamic theories on socio-political organization by prominent Islamic thinkers that conform to Islamic values and law. One Islamist view rejects democracy, but at least one other accommodates it:

- The moderate Islamist view stresses the concepts of maslaha (public interest), ʿadl (justice), and shura. Islamic leaders are considered to uphold justice if they promote public interest, as defined through shura. In this view, shura provides the basis for representative government institutions that are similar to Western democracy, but reflect Islamic rather than Western liberal values. Hasan al-Turabi, Rashid al-Ghannushi, and Yusuf al-Qaradawi have advocated different forms of this view.
- The liberal Islamic view is influenced by Muhammad Abduh's emphasis on the role of reason in understanding religion. It stresses democratic principles based on pluralism and freedom of thought. Authors like Fahmi Huwaidi and Tariq al-Bishri have constructed Islamic justifications for full citizenship of non-Muslims in an Islamic state by drawing on early Islamic texts. Others, like Mohammed Arkoun and Nasr Hamid Abu Zayd, have justified pluralism and freedom through non-literalist approaches to textual interpretation. Abdolkarim Soroush has argued for a "religious democracy" based on religious thought that is democratic, tolerant, and just. Islamic liberals argue for the necessity of constant reexamination of religious understanding, which can only be done in a democratic context.

=== Muslim political opinion and theories ===
As of the late 20th century (1988) scholar Bernard Lewis testifies to the popular power of Islam, which

for the masses in most Muslim countries ... is still the ultimate criterion of group identity and loyalty. It is Islam which distinguishes between self and other, between insider and outsider, between brother and stranger ... Muslims find their basic identity in the religious community; that is to say, in an entity defined by Islam rather than by ethnic origin, language or country.

==== Opinion polls (2012, 2018) ====
Polls conducted by Gallup and Pew Research Center in Muslim-majority countries indicate that most Muslims see no contradiction between democratic values and religious principles, desiring neither a theocracy, nor a secular democracy, but rather a political model where democratic institutions and values can coexist with the values and principles of sharia. Opinions in the polls varied by country.

- 2007 poll by Gallup found strong majorities in Egypt, Jordan, and Pakistan agreeing with the statement the Shari'a must be the only source of legislation, while majorities in Indonesia and Iran agreed that it should be "a source but not the only source", and a majority in Turkey thought it should not be a source.
- In a 2012 poll, Pew found that strong majorities in Pakistan, Jordan and Egypt believed that laws should strictly follow the teachings of the Quran, while less than a quarter polled agreed in Turkey, Tunisia and Lebanon.
- Another Pew poll the following year of Muslims in 37 countries around the world found most supported democracy over a strong leader, and strong support for the toleration of non-Muslims practicing their religion. At the same time, many Muslims agreed that religious leaders should influence political matters and that Islamic political parties were just as good or better than non-Islamic political parties, with more religious respondents more likely to support religious leaders in politics.

==== Islamic political attitudes ====
Based on the Pew and Gallup opinion polls, Western scholars John Esposito and Natana J. DeLong-Bas distinguish four attitudes toward sharia and democracy prominent among Muslims, as of 2018:

- Advocacy of democratic ideas, often accompanied by a claim that they are compatible with Islam, which can play a public role within a democratic system, as exemplified by many protestors who took part in the Arab Spring uprisings;
- Support for democratic procedures such as elections, combined with religious or moral objections toward some aspects of Western democracy seen as incompatible with sharia, as exemplified by Islamic scholars like Yusuf al-Qaradawi;
- Rejection of democracy as a Western import and advocacy of traditional Islamic institutions, such as shura (consultation) and ijma (consensus), as exemplified by supporters of absolute monarchy and radical Islamist movements;
- Belief that democracy requires restricting religion to private life, held by a minority in the Muslim world.

=== Shīʿa—Sunnī differences ===
==== Guardianship of the Jurist of Shi'i Islam ====
With the 1979 Iranian Islamic Revolution, the traditional Twelver Shia Islamic attitude towards politics (either political cooperation with the ruler, political activism challenging the ruler, or aloofness from politics) shifted strongly towards political activism. (The revolution's leader Ruhollah Khomeini proclaiming "Islam is the religion of politics with its all dimensions. It is very clear for those who have the least knowledge of political, economic and social aspects of Islam.") (Note: As for minority Shi'i groups, Zaidiyyah and Isma'ilis do not currently play an active "religious-political" role, at least according to Jebran Chamieh.)

The largest, wealthiest and most solidly Shi'i country (Iran) had an Islamist revolution and its radical change in ideology affected the rest of the Shi'i world.

The new revolutionary regime was based on Ayatollah Ruhollah Khomeini's principle of applying Guardianship of the Islamic Jurist (Wilāyat al-Faqīh) towards government. Twelvers believe that in the absence of (what Twelvers believe is) the religious and political leader of Islam—the "infallible Imam", who Shi'a believe will reappear sometime before Judgement Day) -- righteous Shi'i jurists (faqīh), should administer "some" of the "religious and social affairs" of the Shi'i community. In its "absolute" form—the form advanced by the Ayatollah Ruhollah Khomeini and the basis of government in Islamic Republic of Iran—the state and society are ruled by an Islamic jurist (Ali Khamenei as of 2022).

The theory was a variant of Islamism, holding that since sharia law has everything needed to rule a state (whether ancient or modern), and any other basis of governance will lead to injustice and sin, a state must be ruled according to sharia and the person who should rule is an expert in sharia.

The theory of sovereignty of the Guardianship of the Jurist (in fact of all Islam) explained by at least one conservative Shi'i scholar (Mohammad-Taqi Mesbah-Yazdi), is contrasted with the theory of sovereignty in "most of the schools of political philosophy and other cultures". Non-Muslim cultures hold that "every man is free", and in democratic cultures in particular, "sovereignty ... belongs to the people". A ruler and government must have the consent of the governed to have political legitimacy. Whereas in fact, sovereignty is God's. The "entire universe and whatever in it belongs to God ... the Exalted, and all their movements and acts must have to be in accordance with the command or prohibition of the Real Owner". Consequently, human beings "have no right to rule over others or to choose someone to rule", i.e. choose someone to rule themselves. In an Islamic state, rule must be according to God's law and the ruler must be best person to enforce God's law. The people's "consent and approval" are valuable for developing and strengthening the Islamic government but irrelevant for its legitimacy.

==== Shīʿa—Sunnī disputes ====
According to the Iranian-American academic Vali Nasr, (Note: which serves as Majid Khaddouri Professor of International Affairs and Middle East Studies at the Johns Hopkins School of Advanced International Studies (SAIS)) political tendencies of Shīʿa and Sunnī Islamic ideologies began to differ significantly following the Iranian Revolution. Sunnī fundamentalism "in Pakistan and much of the Arab world" was not "politically revolutionary". Rather than trying to change the political system through revolutionary struggle, it was primarily focused on attempting to Islamicize the political establishment. Iran, however was very interested in exporting its revolutionary ideas, and its conception of political Islam involved Ruhollah Khomeini's ideas on fighting oppression of the poor and class war, which characterized the success of the Islamic Revolution in Iran:

With the Shia awakening of Iran, the years of sectarian tolerance were over. What followed was a Sunni-versus-Shia contest for dominance, and it grew intense. [...] The revolution even moved leftists in Muslim-majority countries such as Indonesia, Turkey, and Lebanon to look at Islam with renewed interest. After all, in Iran, Islam had succeeded where leftist ideologies had failed. [...] But admiration for what had happened in Iran did not equal acceptance of Iranian leadership. Indeed, Islamic activists outside of Iran quickly found Iranian revolutionaries to be arrogant, offputting, and drunk on their own success. Moreover, Sunni fundamentalism in Pakistan and much of the Arab world was far from politically revolutionary. It was rooted in conservative religious impulses and the bazaars, mixing mercantile interests with religious values. As the French scholar of contemporary Islam Gilles Kepel puts it, it was less to tear down the existing system than to give it a fresh, thick coat of "Islamic green" paint. Khomeini's fundamentalism, by contrast, was "red"—that is, genuinely revolutionary.

The American political analyst and author Graham E. Fuller, specialized in the study of Islamism and Islamic extremism, has also noted that he found "no mainstream Islamist organization (with the exception of [Shīʿa] Iran) with radical social views or a revolutionary approach to the social order apart from the imposition of legal justice."

==== Contemporary movements ====
Some common political currents in Islam include: Sunni Traditionalism, Fundamentalist reformism, Salafi jihadism, Islamism, Liberalism and progressivism within Islam. Of these, only Liberal/progressivism and Islamism embrace political action.

- Sunni Traditionalism, which accepts traditional commentaries on the Quran, hadith literature, and sunnah, and "takes as its basic principle imitation (taqlid), that is, refusal to innovate", follows one of the four legal schools or Madh'hab (Shafiʽi, Maliki, Hanafi, Hanbali), and may include Sufism. An example of Sufi traditionalism is the Barelvi school in Pakistan.
- Fundamentalist reformism or revivalism, which criticizes the Islamic scholastic tradition, the commentaries, popular religious practices such as visitation to and veneration of the shrines and tombs of Muslim saints, perceived deviations and superstitions; it aims to return to the founding scriptures of Islam. This fundamentalist reformism generally developed in response to a perceived external threat (for example, the influence of Hinduism on Islam). 18th-century examples of fundamentalist Muslim reformers are Shah Waliullah Dehlawi in British India and Muhammad ibn Abd al-Wahhab in the Arabian peninsula, founder of the Islamic doctrine and movement known as Wahhabism. Salafism and Wahhabism worldwide, the Deobandi school in South Asia (mainly Pakistan and Afghanistan), Ahl-i Hadith and Tablighi Jamaat in India, Bangladesh, Indonesia, Malaysia, and Pakistan are modern examples of fundamentalist reformism and revivalism. Scholar Olivier Roy argues that unlike Islamists, "Neofundamentalism" (which includes Wahhabi and Salafi Islam) have no political element as they reject political action (such as founding or joining a political party even if the party is an Islamic one) as unislamic. Politic action like economy, constitution, political party, revolution, social justice, etc., are Western conceptual categories Muslims should have nothing to do with, even if they are given "an Islamic slant." "Indulging in politics, even for a good cause, will by definition lead to bid'a and shirk by "giving of priority to worldly considerations over religious values."
- Salafi jihadism, (such as Al Qaeda, Boko Haram, ISIS), Sunni Salafism of those who seek to establish a global caliphate through armed struggle. Salafi jihadism is often described as "religiopolitical"Islamist and an "ideology". Notwithstanding this they have not engaged in any traditional political (as opposed to murderous or religious) activities. Al Qaeda, for example, has had "no political branch, union, women's organization, student branch or press, and there are no fellow-travelers. The `masses` are left on the pavement ... In this sense Al Qaeda is more a mafia or a sect than a professional underground organisation."
- Islamism or political Islam, embracing a return to the sharia or Islamic law but adopting Western terminology such as revolution, ideology, politics, and democracy, and taking a more liberal attitude towards issues like jihad and women's rights. Contemporary examples include the Jamaat-e-Islami, Muslim Brotherhood, Iranian Islamic Revolution, Masyumi party, United Malays National Organisation, Pan-Malaysian Islamic Party and Justice and Development Party (Turkey).
- Liberal and progressive movements within Islam generally define themselves in opposition to Islamist and Islamic fundamentalist political movements, but often embrace many of their anti-imperialist and Islam-inspired liberal reformist elements. Liberal Muslims affirm the promotion of progressive values such as democracy, gender equality, human rights, LGBT rights, women's rights, religious pluralism, interfaith marriage, freedom of expression, freedom of thought, and freedom of religion; opposition to theocracy and total rejection of Islamism and Islamic fundamentalism; and a modern view of Islamic theology, ethics, sharia, culture, tradition, and other ritualistic practices in Islam. Liberal Islam emphasizes the re-interpretation of the Islamic scriptures in order to preserve their relevance in the 21st century.

=== 20th and 21st centuries ===
==== Disempowerment of Islamic jurists ====
Khaled Abou El Fadl argues that in the late twentieth and early twenty first centuries a unique and "major shift" in governance has taken place in much of the Muslim world, namely that "the traditional institutions that once sustained and propagated Islamic orthodoxy -- have been dismantled". Prior to the twentieth century, the governments Islamic states tended to follow a system based on a balanced coexistence of sultan and ulama where the Islamic legal scholars made sure the rules of the sharia were adhered to. But modern Muslim states have much more power than pre-colonial states vis-a-vis the Islamic clergy, who have been "transformed" by the modern states "into salaried employees". The private endowments (awqaf) of the clergy, that gave them independence, have been taken over by the state. Also contributing to the weakening of the juristic scholarly class and their moderating influence in Islam has been the international propagation of Wahhabism and allied conservative schools of Islam by Saudi Arabian petroleum exporting funds. It has led to the growth of expressions of puritanical intolerance (Abou El Fadl argues), including Salafi Jihadism with its terror attacks on civilians. Legal scholar Noah Feldman credits the beginning of this process with the Tanzimat reforms of the Ottoman Empire that codified Sharia into law [called the Mecelle] replacing Islamic legal jurists. Feldman believes it is no coincidence that the collapse of the influence of independent scholars of Islamic law has coincided with the rise of Islamist movements calling for enforcement of Islamic (sharia) law.

==== Role of shura ====
Some modern political interpretations regarding the role of the Majlis ash-Shura include those expressed by the Egyptian Islamist author and ideologue Sayyid Qutb, prominent member of the Muslim Brotherhood, and the Palestinian Muslim scholar and propagandist Taqiuddin al-Nabhani, founder of the pan-Islamist political party Hizb ut-Tahrir. In an analysis of the shura chapter of the Quran, Qutb argued that Islam requires only that the ruler consult with at least some of the ruled (usually the elite), within the general context of divine laws that the ruler must execute. Al-Nabhani argued that the shura is important and part of "the ruling structure" of the Islamic caliphate, "but not one of its pillars", and may be neglected without the caliphate's rule becoming un-Islamic. However, these interpretations formulated by Qutb and al-Nabhani are not universally accepted in the Islamic political thought, and Islamic democrats consider the shura to be an integral part and important pillar of the Islamic political system.

Today, many Islamist and Islamic democratic political parties exist in most Muslim-majority countries, alongside numerous insurgent Islamic extremist, militant Islamist, and terrorist movements and organizations. Both of the following terms, Islamic democracy and Islamic fundamentalism, lump together a large variety of political groups with varying aims, histories, ideologies, and backgrounds.

== See also ==
- Glossary of Islam
- Outline of Islam
- Index of Islam-related articles
- Criticism of Islam
- Criticism of Islamism
- Islam and secularism
- Islam and war
- Islam Yes, Islamic Party No
- Islamic democracy
- Islamic extremism
  - International propagation of Salafism and Wahhabism (by region)
  - Islamic terrorism
  - Jihadism
  - Petro-Islam
  - Qutbism
  - Salafism
  - Salafi jihadism
  - Takfirism
  - Wahhabism
- Islamic revival
- Islamism
  - Post-Islamism
- List of Islamic democratic political parties
- Modern Islamic philosophy
- Peace in Islamic philosophy
- Political philosophy of the Islamic Golden Age
- Political quietism in Islam
- Religion in politics
- Transformation of the Ottoman Empire

== Bibliography ==
- Ágoston, Gábor (2021). The Last Muslim Conquest: The Ottoman Empire and Its Wars in Europe. Princeton, New Jersey and Woodstock, Oxfordshire: Princeton University Press. doi:10.2307/j.ctv1b3qqdc. ISBN 9780691205380. JSTOR j.ctv1b3qqdc. LCCN 2020046920. OCLC 1224042619. S2CID 243417695.
- Anthony, Sean W. (2020). "Introduction: The Making of the Historical Muhammad – Part I: Muhammad the Merchant". Muhammad and the Empires of Faith: The Making of the Prophet of Islam. Berkeley and Oakland: University of California Press. pp. 1–84. doi:10.1525/9780520974524-004. ISBN 9780520340411. LCCN 2019035331. OCLC 1153189160. S2CID 240957346.
- Black, Antony (2014) [2001]. History of Islamic Political Thought: From the Prophet to the Present (2nd ed.). Edinburgh: Edinburgh University Press. ISBN 9780748688784. OCLC 855017249.
- Bleeker, C.J. (1968), Fasting in the Koran, BRILL Archive
- Chamieh, Jebran (1992). Traditionalists, Militants and Liberal in Present Islam. Research and Publishing House.
- Conrad, Lawrence I.; Jabbur, Suhayl J., eds. (1995). The Bedouins and the Desert: Aspects of Nomadic Life in the Arab East. SUNY Series in Near Eastern Studies. Albany, New York: SUNY Press. ISBN 9780791428528.
- Cook, Michael (2024). A History of the Muslim World. Princeton University Press. ISBN 978-0-691-23658-2.
- Firestone, Reuven (1999). Jihad: The Origin of Holy War in Islam. Oxford University Press. ISBN 978-0-19-535219-1.
- Haider, Najam (2019). "Modeling Islamic Historical Writing". The Rebel and the Imām in Early Islam: Explorations in Muslim Historiography. Cambridge and New York: Cambridge University Press. pp. 1–25. doi:10.1017/9781139199223.001. ISBN 9781139199223. OCLC 1164503161. S2CID 216606313.
- Hazleton, Lesley (2013), The First Muslim: The Story of Muhammad, Atlantic Books
- Hughes, Aaron W. (2013). "Part I: Origins". Muslim Identities: An Introduction to Islam. New York: Columbia University Press. pp. 15–40. ISBN 9780231531924. LCCN 2012036923. OCLC 809989049.
- Kepel, Gilles (2006). Jihad: The Trail of Political Islam. I.B. Tauris. ISBN 9781845112578.
- Khatab, Sayed (2006). The Power of Sovereignty: The Political and Ideological Philosophy of Sayyid Qutb. Routledge Studies in Political Islam (1st ed.). London and New York: Routledge. ISBN 9780203086940. OCLC 433839891.
- Khomeini, Ruhollah (1981). Algar, Hamid (ed.). Islam and Revolution : Writing and Declarations of Imam Khomeini. Translated by Algar, Hamid. Berkeley, CA: Mizan Press. ISBN 9781483547541.
- Kurzman, Charles (1998). "Liberal Islam and Its Islamic Context". In Kurzman, Charles (ed.). Liberal Islam: A Sourcebook. Oxford and New York: Oxford University Press. pp. 1–26. ISBN 9780195116229. OCLC 37368975.
- Lewis, Bernard (1993). Islam and the West. Oxford, New York: Oxford University Press.
- Lewis, Bernard (1995). The Middle East : a Brief History of the Last 2000 Years. New York: Touchstone.
- Lewis, Bernard (1995). "Part III: The Dawn and Noon of Islam – Origins". The Middle East: A Brief History of the Last 2,000 Years. New York: Scribner. ISBN 9780684832807. OCLC 34190629.
- Lewis, Bernard (1988). The Political Language of Islam. University of Chicago Press.
- Milani, Milad (2018). Sufi Political Thought. Routledge Religion in Contemporary Asia Series (1st ed.). London and New York: Routledge. ISBN 9780367870256. LCCN 2017023114. OCLC 1010957516.
- Oliver-Dee, Sean (2009). The Caliphate Question: The British Government and Islamic Governance. Lanham, Maryland and Plymouth, U.K.: Lexington Books. ISBN 978-0-7391-3603-4. LCCN 2009018328.
- Robinson, Chase F. (2010). "Introduction / The rise of Islam, 600 705". In Robinson, Chase F. (ed.). The New Cambridge History of Islam. Vol. 1: The Formation of the Islamic World, Sixth to Eleventh Centuries. Cambridge University Press. pp. 1–15, 173–225. ISBN 978-0-521-83823-8.
- Rogerson, Barnaby (2010), The Prophet Muhammad: A Biography, Hachette UK
- Roy, Olivier (1994). The Failure of Political Islam [Echec de l'Islam Politique]. Translated by Volk, Carol. Cambridge Massachusetts: Harvard University Press.
- Roy, Olivier (2004). Globalized Islam : the Search for a New Ummah. Columbia University Press.
- Rubin, Uri (19 April 2022). The Life of Muhammad. Taylor & Francis. ISBN 978-1-351-88676-5.
- Sahner, Christian C. (June 2017). ""The Monasticism of My Community is Jihad": A Debate on Asceticism, Sex, and Warfare in Early Islam". Arabica. 64 (2). Leiden: Brill Publishers: 149–183. doi:10.1163/15700585-12341453. ISSN 1570-0585. S2CID 165034994.
- Saikal, Amin (2021) [2019]. Iran Rising: The Survival and Future of the Islamic Republic. Princeton, New Jersey and Woodstock, Oxfordshire: Princeton University Press. doi:10.1515/9780691184197. ISBN 9780691184197. JSTOR j.ctvc77cbb. LCCN 2018936897. S2CID 241721596.
- Serjeant, R. B. (1964). "The Constitution of Medina". Islamic Quarterly. 8: 3–16.
- Serjeant, R. B. (1978). "Sunnah Jāmi'ah, pacts with the Yathrib Jews, and the Tahrīm of Yathrib: analysis and translation of the documents comprised in the so-called 'Constitution of Medina'". Bulletin of the School of Oriental and African Studies. 41 (1): 1–42. doi:10.1017/S0041977X00057761. S2CID 161485671.
- Soleimani, Kamal (2016). "Religious (Islamic) Thought, Nationalism, and the Politics of Caliphate". Islam and Competing Nationalisms in the Middle East, 1876-1926. The Modern Muslim World. London and New York: Palgrave Macmillan. pp. 19–70. doi:10.1057/978-1-137-59940-7. ISBN 978-1-137-59940-7. LCCN 2016939591.
- Tibi, Bassam (2002) [1998]. "The Context: Globalization, Fragmentation, and Disorder". The Challenge of Fundamentalism: Political Islam and the New World Disorder. Comparative Studies in Religion and Society (Updated ed.). Berkeley and Los Angeles: University of California Press. pp. 1–19. doi:10.1525/9780520929753-002. ISBN 9780520929753.
- Watt, William Montgomery (1956). Muhammad at Medina. Clarendon Press.
- Yılmaz, Hüseyin (2018). Caliphate Redefined: The Mystical Turn in Ottoman Political Thought. Princeton, New Jersey and Woodstock, Oxfordshire: Princeton University Press. doi:10.2307/j.ctvc77bv4. ISBN 9781400888047. JSTOR j.ctvc77bv4. LCCN 2017936620. OCLC 1203056833.
