= Jarbas =

Jarbas (['ʒaɾbɐʃ], ['ʒaʁbɐʃ] or ['ʒaɾbɐs]) is a Portuguese-language given name of Phoenician and Punic origin (from the king of Numidia Hiarbas). It may refer to:

- Jarbas Passarinho (1920-2016), Brazilian military officer and politician
- Jarbas Faustinho (born 1939), known as Cané, Brazilian football manager and former winger
- Jarbas Vasconcelos (born 1942), Brazilian politician and lawyer
- Jarbas (footballer) (born 1957), Jarbas Tomazoli Nunes, Brazilian football forward
- Jarbas Mascarenhas (born 1980), Brazilian sprinter

== See also ==
- Jarba, Palestinian village
