= Expedition of Tabuk =

630 military campaign in the early Muslim period

Coordinates: 28°23′N 36°35′E

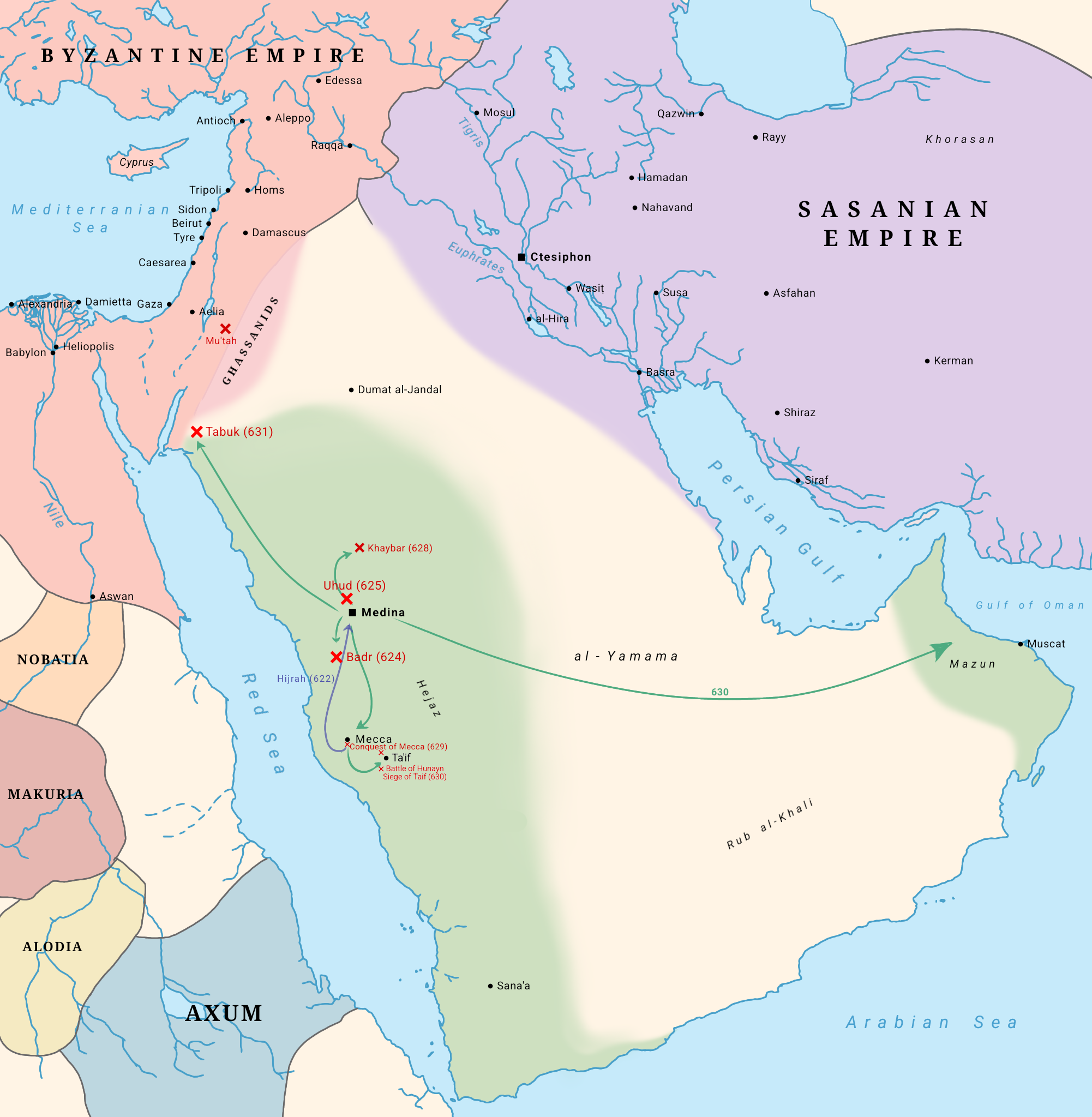
Map of Muslim conquests (Tabuk included)

The Expedition of Tabuk (Arabic: غَزوَة تَبوك; Ghazwat Tabūk), also known as the Campaign of Hardship (Ghazwat al-ʿUsrah), was a military campaign that was initiated by the Islamic prophet Muhammad in October 630 CE (Rajab AH 9), in response to reports of a potential Byzantine invasion of northern Arabia. He led a force of as many as 30,000 north to Tabuk, near the Gulf of Aqaba, in present-day northwestern Saudi Arabia. Although no direct battle occurred, the campaign was significant for asserting Muslim presence in the region and securing strategic alliances.

== Background ==
After the Muslim victory at the Battle of Hunayn in the aftermath of the conquest of Mecca, the political landscape of Arabia shifted in favour of the emerging First Islamic state. Reports were received by Muhammad that the Byzantine Empire, under Emperor Heraclius, was mobilising troops in the Levant, supported by their Arab Christian client tribes such as the Ghassanids.

Historians differ on the accuracy of these reports. According to al-Tabari, it was believed that Heraclius had stationed a large force at Balqa in southern Syria. Some modern scholars, however, suggest that this intelligence may have been exaggerated or even unsubstantiated.

== Mobilization and march ==
In response, Muhammad called for a mobilisation. The campaign was undertaken during a time of severe heat and drought, testing the resolve of the Muslim community. The Quran refers to this expedition as the Campaign of Hardship,^{[Quran 9:117]} noting the difficulties faced and the initial reluctance of some companions.

The army comprised approximately 30,000 men, including 10,000 cavalry—the largest force yet assembled by the Muslims. Wealthy companions such as Uthman contributed substantial financial and material support. Ibn Hisham records that Uthman equipped one-third of the army and donated 1,000 gold dinars. The army marched northward over 700 km to Tabuk, near the Gulf of Aqaba, close to the modern border of Saudi Arabia and Jordan in October 630 (Rajab AH 9). It was his largest and last military expedition. Ali ibn Abi Talib, who participated in several other expeditions of Muhammad, did not participate in Muhammad's Tabuk expedition upon Muhammad's instructions, as he held command at Medina.

== At Tabuk ==
Upon arrival, Muhammad spent twenty days at Tabuk, scouting the area, making alliances with local Christian and Arab tribes, including the rulers of Aylah (modern Aqaba), Jarba, and Adhruh, who agreed to pay jizya in return for protection. With no sign of the Byzantine army, he decided to return to Medina. There is no evidence that a Byzantine army was deployed in the region at the time, leading some scholars to conclude that the threat was either misperceived or that the Byzantines withdrew upon learning of Muhammad's advance. Though Muhammad did not encounter a Byzantine army at Tabuk, according to the Oxford Encyclopedia of the Islamic World, "this show of force demonstrated his intention to challenge the Byzantines for control of the northern part of the caravan route from Mecca to Syria".

== Return to Medina ==
The expedition ended without combat, but it had lasting consequences. On returning to Medina, Muhammad was welcomed by those who had remained behind.

Moreover, it exposed the hypocrisy of certain individuals who had refused to participate. The Qur’an censures them in several verses, particularly in Surat at-Tawbah, where they are referred to as the "hypocrites" (munāfiqūn).^{[Quran 9:81–96]}

== See also ==
- List of expeditions of Muhammad
- Military career of Muhammad
- Hadith of position
- Arabian Peninsula
  - Hejaz
  - Midian
