= Taḥannuth =

Taḥannuth (Arabic: التَحَنُّث) was a religious practice undertaken in pre- and early Islamic Arabia, in which the participant spent time in isolation, turning away from paganism.

== Etymology ==
According to Bleeker, the term taḥannuth can be interpreted in several ways. Traditionally, taḥannuth means spending time in seclusion, as practiced by the Quraysh, the chief tribe of Mecca in the 6th and 7th century, and the Islamic prophet Muhammad, who each year spend time in isolation at mount Hira', where he also received his revelations. According to Ibn Hisham and al-Tabari, taḥannuth may be interpreted as tabarrur, "the holding of pious exercises." Taḥannuth is also read as ''taḥannuf, that is, al-hanifyya, the religion of the hanif. Al-Bukhari interprets taḥannuth as ta'abbud, "worshipping." According to Bleeker, taḥannuth may also be traced to Hebrew tehinnot, private prayers. A third possibility is that it is derived from hinth, sin, meaning "purifying from sin, avoidance of sin," the sin of paganism, akin to the Hebrew-Aramaic root h-n-ph, to be a pagan. In that case, taḥannuth would mean "turning away from paganism."

== See also ==
- Hanif

== Sources ==
- Bleeker, C.J. (1968), Fasting in the Koran, BRILL Archive
