= Muhammad after the occupation of Mecca =

Period of Muhammad's life following the Muslim conquest of Mecca

The Islamic prophet Muhammad led the conquest of Mecca in Ramadan of the Islamic year 8 AH (corresponding to Dec. 629/Jan. 630). The Quraysh in Mecca was Muhammad's final major rival in the Arabian Peninsula, and following the conquest Muhammad focused his military operations on further expansion of his Islamic realm to the north, with a campaign against the Ghassanids and the Byzantine Empire.

Muhammad died on 8 June 632. In the period following his death, known as the first fitna, there was significant internal conflict in the Islamic world about the succession to Muhammad, further worsening the Shia-Sunni divide.

== Background ==
This period was preceded by that of Muhammad in Medina, and began after the Conquest of Mecca, which was the result of the violation of the Treaty of Hudaybiyyah, signed between the Muslims and the Quraysh as a 9 year, 9 month and 9 day armistice in the year 629.

=== Treaty of Hudaybiyyah ===
The Treaty of Hudaybiyyah was a pact signed between Muhammad and the Quraysh in the year 629, following Muhammad's departure from Medina to perform the Umrah pilgrimage. After taking an unconventional route around Mecca, Muhammad and his companions encamped at Hudaybiyyah, and the treaty was drafted, signed and ratified here. It was presented as a 9 year, 9 month and 9 day armistice between the Muslims, the Quraysh, and their allies.

Less than two years later, the tribe of Banu Bakr, which was allied with the Quraysh, broke the treaty when they attacked the Banu Khuza'ah, who were allied with the Muslims. Muhammad gave the violators 4 months to reconsider their position and demanded retributive justice for the victims. After this 4-month period expired, Muhammad marched with a 10,000-strong army toward Mecca.

== History ==
=== Conquest of Mecca ===
Conquest of Makkah

Muhammad led around 10,000 of his companions toward Mecca in Ramadan 8 AH, which could correspond to December 629 or January 630. Abu Sufyan, leader of the Quraysh in Mecca, aware that Mecca could not prepare a force matching the strength of Muhammad's, left for Medina in an attempt to restore the treaty, but Muhammad refused to accommodate him, and Abu Sufyan returned to Mecca. He later negotiated a bloodless transfer-of-power of Mecca from the Quraysh and converted to Islam Muhammad acted generously to the Meccans, demanding only that the pagan idols in and around the Kaaba be destroyed.

==== Battle of Hunayn ====
The Battle of Hunain was fought between Muhammad and his followers against the Bedouin tribe of Hawazin and its subsection the Thaqif in 630 in a valley on one of the roads leading from Mecca to al-Ta'if. The battle ended in a decisive victory for the Muslims, who captured enormous spoils. The Battle of Hunayn is one of only two battles mentioned in the Qur'an by name, in Sura. The Hawazin and their allies, the Thaqif, began mobilizing their forces when they learnt from their spies that Muhammad and his army had departed from Medina to begin an assault on Mecca. The confederates apparently hoped to attack the Muslim army while it besieged Mecca. Muhammad, however, uncovered their intentions through his own spies in the camp of the Hawazin, and marched against the Hawazin just two weeks after the conquest of Mecca with a force of 12,000 men. Only four weeks had elapsed since quitting Medina. The Bedouin commander Malik ibn Awf al-Nasri ambushed the Muslims at a place where the road to al-Taif enters winding gorges; the Muslims, surprised by the assault of the Bedouin cavalry, who they thought were encamped at Awtas, began retreating in disarray. Modern historians have been unable to fully reconstruct the course of the battle from this point onwards because the different Muslim sources describing the battle give contradictory accounts. Because Malik ibn Awf al-Nasri had brought the families and flocks of the Hawazin along, the Muslims were able to capture huge spoils, consisting of 6,000 women and children and 24,000 camels. Some Bedouins fled, and split into two groups. One group went back, resulting in the Battle of Autas, while the larger group found refuge at al-Ta'if, where Muhammad besieged them.

==== Siege of Ta'if ====
The Siege of Taif took place in 630 CE, as the Muslims besieged the city of Taif after their victory in the Battle of Hunayn and Autas. However, the city did not succumb to the siege. One of their chieftains, Urwah ibn Mas'ud, was absent in Yemen during that siege.

==== 10 AH ====
- Hadith of Mubahela

=== 631 CE ===
==== Battle of Tabouk ====
The Battle of Tabouk (also called the Battle of Tabuk) was a military expedition said to have been led by Muhammed in October 630 CE. According to Muslim biographies, Muhammed led a force of as many as 30,000 north to Tabouk in present-day northwestern Saudi Arabia, with the intention of engaging the Byzantine army. Though not a battle in the typical sense, if historical the event would represent the opening conflict in the coming Byzantine-Arab wars. There is no contemporary Byzantine account of the events, and much of the details come from later Muslim sources. Noting this, as well as the fact that the armies never met, some Western scholars have questioned the authenticity of the details surrounding the event; though in the Arab world it is widely held as historical.

==== Ghassanids ====
The Ghassanids were a group of South Arabian Christian tribes that emigrated in the early 3rd century from Yemen to the Hauran in southern Syria, Jordan and the Holy Land where some intermarried[dubious – discuss] with Hellenized Roman settlers and Greek-speaking Early Christian communities. The term Ghassān refers to the kingdom of the Ghassanids.

==== Thaqif adopts Islam ====
Thaqif, the main tribe of the town of Ta'if, adopted Islam in 632, which was exciting since they were beaten in the battle of Hunayn against the Muslims.

=== 632 ===
==== Thursday, June 4 – Muhammad's will ====
Muhammad became ill and his health took a serious turn on a Thursday. He summoned his companions and announced that he wanted to write a will, he asked for writing materials to write a statement that would "prevent the Muslim nation from going astray for ever". The first person to reply was Umar, answering that there was no need for any will as Muhammad was ill and Umar had the Qur'an, which was sufficient for him.

==== Saturday, June 6 – Usama's dispatchment ====
Muhammad had earlier sent an expedition against the Byzantine Empire (Roman) that led to what was known as the Battle of Mut'ah. The leader of that expedition was the dark-colored Zayd ibn Haritha, Muhammad's former adopted son. Zayd died during that expedition.

==== Monday, June 8 – death ====
He died on Monday, June 8, 632 A.D/ 12 Rabi' ul-Awwal, 11 A.H.

== Aftermath ==
This period was followed by the period of the Succession to Muhammad.

== See also ==
- History of Islam
- Timeline of Islamic history
