= Jarba =

Village in Jenin Governorate, West Bank

- Municipality type D (Village council)

Arabic transcription(s)
  - Arabic: جربا
- Location of Jarba within Palestine
- Coordinates: 32°23′08″N 35°15′22″E
- Palestine grid: 174/199
- State: State of Palestine
- Governorate: Jenin

Government
  - Type: Village council

Population (2017)
  - Total: 63
- Name meaning: El Jŭrbah, the plantation

Jarba (Arabic: جربا) is a Palestinian village in the Jenin Governorate.

== History ==
Pottery sherds from the Byzantine (10%), early Muslim (30%) and the Middle Ages (30%) have been found at Jarba.

=== Ottoman era ===
Jarba, like all of Palestine, was incorporated into the Ottoman Empire in 1517. About 30% of the pottery sherds found in the village date back to this period. In the 1596 Ottoman tax registers, it was located in the nahiya of Jabal Sami, part of Sanjak of Nablus. Jarba was listed as an entirely Muslim village with a population of 11 households and 2 bachelors. The inhabitants paid a fixed tax rate of 33,3% on agricultural products, including wheat, barley, summer crops, olive trees, and goats and/or beehives, in addition to occasional revenues and a tax on people from the Nablus area, a total of 1,500 akçe.

In 1838 el-Jurba was noted as a village in the District of esh-Sha'rawiyeh esh-Shurkiyeh, the eastern part.

In 1870, Victor Guérin noted it as a small village situated on a neighboring hill from Misilyah.

In 1882 the PEF's Survey of Western Palestine (SWP) described Jurba as: "a small village on the side of a slope, with olives to the south."

=== British Mandate era ===
In the 1922 census of Palestine, conducted by the British Mandate authorities, Jarba had a population of 31 Muslims, increasing in the 1931 census to 65 Muslim, in a total of 17 houses.

In the 1944/5 statistics the population was 100, all Muslims, with 3,530 dunams of land, according to an official land and population survey. 100 dunams were used for plantations and irrigable land, 1,553 for cereals, while 2 dunams were built-up (urban) land.

=== Jordanian era ===
In the wake of the 1948 Arab–Israeli War, and after the 1949 Armistice Agreements, Jarba came under Jordanian rule.

=== post-1967 ===
Since the Six-Day War in 1967, Jarba has been under Israeli occupation.

== Byzantine site at Nazlat Rahal ==
Just southwest of Jarba is Nazlat Rahal, where Byzantine ceramics have been found. SWP found at Kh. Haj Rah-hal: "traces of ruins."

== Bibliography ==
- Barron, J.B., ed. (1923). Palestine: Report and General Abstracts of the Census of 1922. Government of Palestine.
- Conder, C.R.; Kitchener, H.H. (1882). The Survey of Western Palestine: Memoirs of the Topography, Orography, Hydrography, and Archaeology. Vol. 2. London: Committee of the Palestine Exploration Fund.
- Dauphin, C. (1998). La Palestine byzantine, Peuplement et Populations. BAR International Series 726 (in French). Vol. III : Catalogue. Oxford: Archeopress. ISBN 0-860549-05-4.
- Government of Palestine, Department of Statistics (1945). Village Statistics, April, 1945.
- Guérin, V. (1874). Description Géographique Historique et Archéologique de la Palestine (in French). Vol. 2: Samarie, pt. 1. Paris: L'Imprimerie Nationale.
- Hadawi, S. (1970). Village Statistics of 1945: A Classification of Land and Area ownership in Palestine. Palestine Liberation Organization Research Center.
- Hütteroth, W.-D.; Abdulfattah, K. (1977). Historical Geography of Palestine, Transjordan and Southern Syria in the Late 16th Century. Erlanger Geographische Arbeiten, Sonderband 5. Erlangen, Germany: Vorstand der Fränkischen Geographischen Gesellschaft. ISBN 3-920405-41-2.
- Palmer, E.H. (1881). The Survey of Western Palestine: Arabic and English Name Lists Collected During the Survey by Lieutenants Conder and Kitchener, R. E. Transliterated and Explained by E.H. Palmer. Committee of the Palestine Exploration Fund.
- Robinson, E.; Smith, E. (1841). Biblical Researches in Palestine, Mount Sinai and Arabia Petraea: A Journal of Travels in the year 1838. Vol. 3. Boston: Crocker & Brewster.
- Zertal, A. (2004). The Manasseh Hill Country Survey. Vol. 1. Boston: BRILL. ISBN 9004137564.
