= Husayn ibn Ali in the Quran and Hadith =

Quran verses and Hadith statements about Husayn ibn Ali

Depiction of Muhammad with his grandsons, Hasan and Husayn in Qajar Persia, mid-19th Century.

This article examines the verses related to Husayn ibn Ali in the Quran from the perspective of commentators, as well as narrations and hadiths that refer to him.

== Verses related to Husayn ==
=== Surah Al-Insan ===
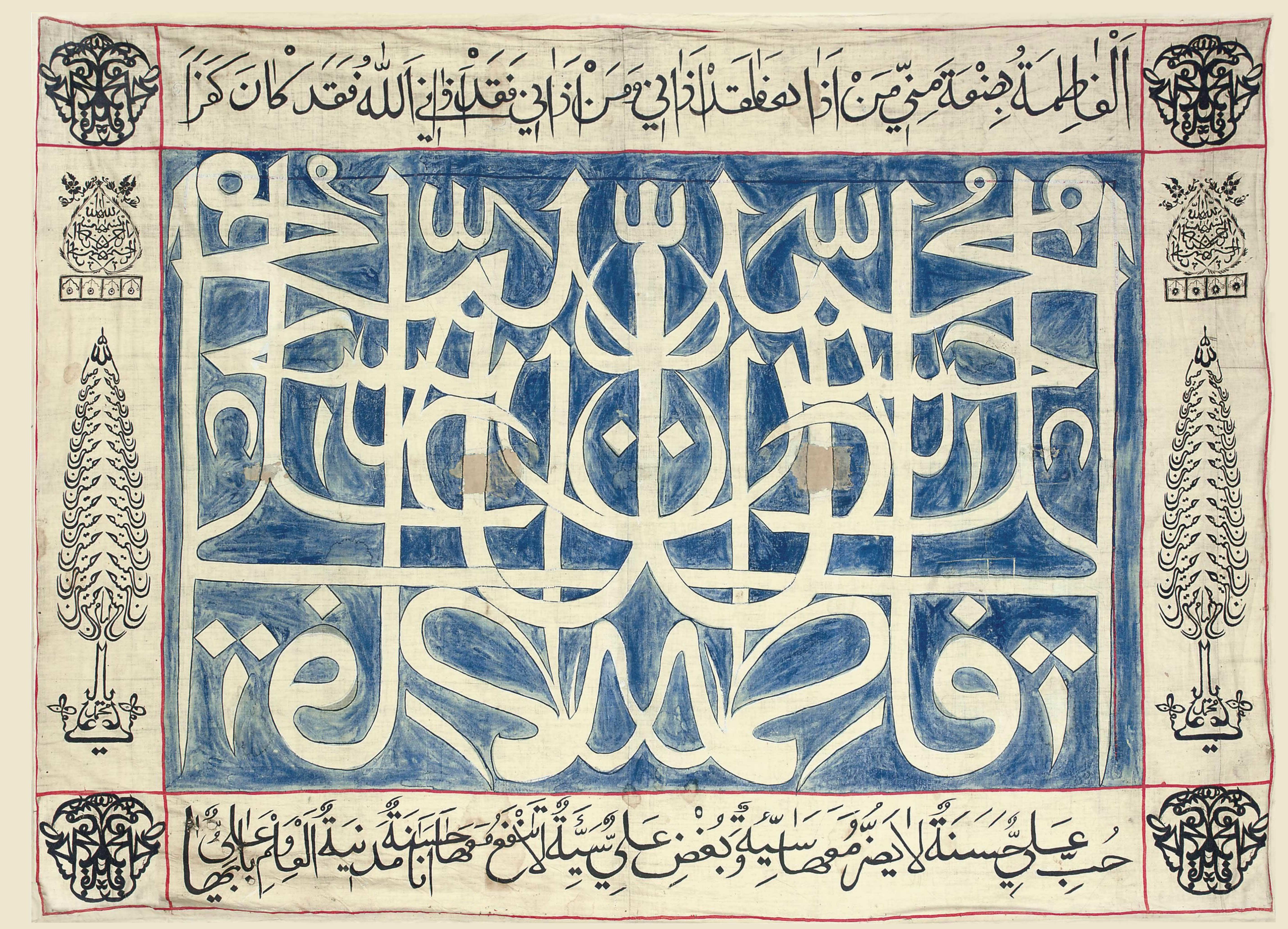
Calligraphic inscription of the name of the Ahl al-Kisa and two hadiths from the Islamic prophet Muhammad on cloth, probably from Iran or Central Asia, 13th century AH

Seyyed Mohammad Hossein Tabatabaei, a Shia Quran commentator, reports narrations from Sunni and Shia books in the narration section of his commentary on this surah. He says that the surah was revealed in connection with Ali and Fatimah, the illness of their child or children, and their vow for their recovery. Based on narrations about the order in which the surahs were revealed, the context of the verses, and other related narrations, he considers this surah to be Medinan. He then discusses some Sunni narrations about a black man and his meeting with the Prophet, which say that the surah was revealed about that man. He rejects this view and gives reasons for it, saying that the surah was revealed about the Ahl al-Bayt.

Among Sunni commentators, Shihab al-Din al-Alusi, in Ruh al-Ma'ani, reports this story along with narrations and statements from other commentators and considers it to be about the Ahl al-Bayt. Based on reports from al-Tirmidhi and Ibn al-Jawzi and the wording of the verses, he says that these reports show that this surah was revealed in Medina. He considers the reason to be the children of Ali and Fatimah, who were born in Medina, and says that this does not conflict with the wording of the verses. He also says that one of the special points of this surah is that, out of respect for Fatimah al-Zahra, it does not mention the houris anywhere and only mentions “wildanun mukhalladun.” Fakhr al-Din al-Razi, in Tafsir al-Kabir, reports the story of the illness of Ali and Fatimah's children from al-Zamakhshari in al-Kashshaf and al-Wahidi in al-Basit. However, he says there is no reason to say that these verses are only about Ali ibn Abi Talib, Fatimah, and their children. Rather, these verses can also apply to all righteous people, such as the Companions and the Followers, unless the verses were revealed because of a specific act of obedience by them. Al-Shawkani, in Fath al-Qadir, also reports a narration from Ibn Mardawayh, from Ibn Abbas, that these verses are about Ali ibn Abi Talib and Fatimah al-Zahra.

=== Verse of Mubahala ===
According to Tabatabaei, the event of Mubahala was one of the events of early Islam. It was a meeting between the Prophet of Islam and his Ahl al-Bayt on one side and the Christians of Najran on the other. During this event, the Christians of Najran argued with the Prophet about whether his call was true. This discussion finally led to Muhammad asking them to take part in Mubahala. Both sides came to the place of Mubahala with their own people. When the Christians saw that Muhammad had come with the people closest to him and his family members—Ali, Fatimah, Hasan, and Husayn—to take part in Mubahala with them, they became certain that they would not come out of it safely, because Muhammad's behavior toward his family showed his confidence in his belief. In Ruh al-Ma'ani, after telling the story of the Christians' discussion with Muhammad about Jesus and Muhammad's proposal of Mubahala, the available narrations are reported. The author states that the people mentioned in the verse of Mubahala are Ali, Fatimah, Hasan, and Husayn, and continues by saying that this shows the superiority of the Ahl al-Bayt. Fakhr al-Razi in Tafsir al-Kabir, Baydawi in Anwar al-Tanzil, al-Mahalli and al-Suyuti in Tafsir al-Jalalayn, and Ibn Kathir in Tafsir al-Qur'an al-Azeem also said that those who were present at the Mubahala were Ali, Fatima, Hassan, and Hussein.

=== Verse of Purification ===
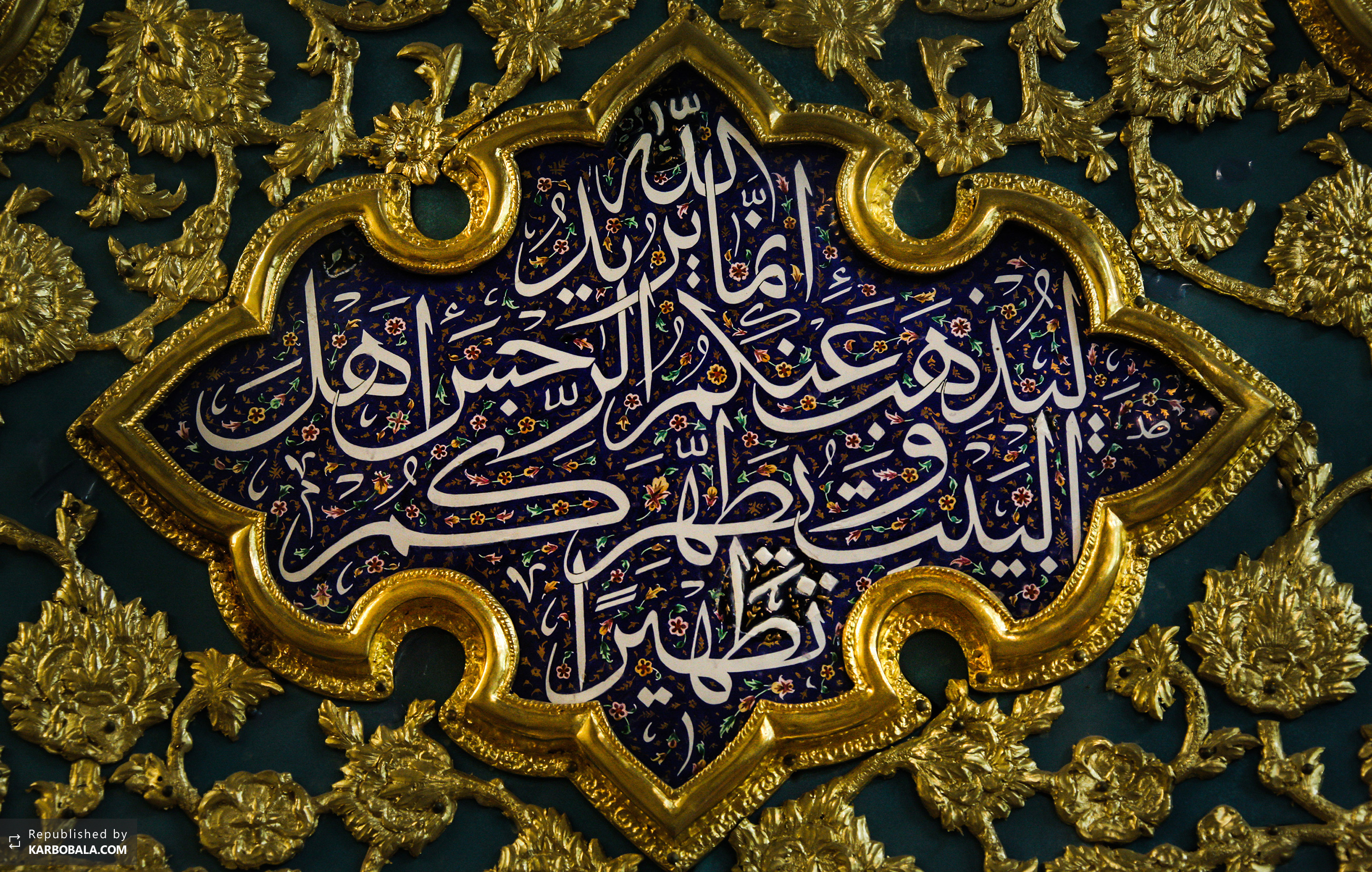
The Verse of Purification (Ayat al-Tathir) in an inscription attributed to the shrine of Imam Husayn

In his discussion of this verse in Al-Mizan, Allameh Tabataba'i says that the people addressed by the verse are the People of the Cloak. He refers to more than seventy hadiths about it, most of which are reported through Sunni sources. Among Sunnis, the narrators of this hadith include Umm Salama, Aisha, Abu Sa'id al-Khudri, Sa'd, Wathila ibn al-Asqa, Abu al-Hamra, Ibn Abbas, Thawban, a freed slave of the Prophet, Abdullah ibn Ja'far, Ali ibn Abi Talib, and Hasan ibn Ali. Nearly forty chains of transmission are reported from them. Among Shia, the narrators are Ali ibn Abi Talib, Ali ibn al-Husayn, Muhammad al-Baqir, Ja'far al-Sadiq, Ali ibn Musa al-Rida, Umm Salama, Abu Dharr, Abu Layla, Abu al-Aswad al-Du'ali, Amr ibn Maymun al-Awdi, and Sa'd ibn Abi Waqqas. More than thirty chains of transmission are reported from them. In his commentary, al-Alusi mentions different narrations about who is meant by the People of the Household in this verse. He also refers to the Hadith of the Cloak and considers the People of the Household to be the People of the Cloak. However, later, when discussing the infallibility and purity of the People of the Household, he presents the Shia view and rejects it. He does not consider the People of the Household to be infallible or pure, and understands this verse as a condition, rather than a verse stating something that had already happened in the past. In his Jami' al-Bayan, al-Tabari cites many hadiths that say this verse refers to Ali, Fatimah, Hasan, and Husayn, and says that some believe that the Ahl al-Bayt of the Prophet refers to them. In Anwar al-Tanzil, al-Baydawi also says that the Shia believe this verse is about Ali, Fatimah, and their two sons. They use this verse to argue that they are infallible, but al-Baydawi says that this argument does not fit with the verses before and after it. He also says that the hadiths only show that they are among the People of the Household of the Prophet. In Tafsir al-Kabir, Fakhr al-Razi says that there are different views about who the People of the Household in this verse are. However, he says that the stronger view is that they are the Prophet's children, Fatimah, his wives, Hasan and Husayn, and Ali. In Tafsir al-Qur'an al-Azim, Ibn Kathir mentions the hadith about the Prophet standing at Fatimah's door for six months, calling the People of the Household to prayer, as well as the Hadith of the Cloak. In Al-Muharrar al-Wajiz, Ibn Atiyya mentions a hadith from the Prophet saying that this verse was revealed about the Prophet, Ali, Fatimah, Hasan, and Husayn. In Ta'wilat Ahl al-Sunna, al-Maturidi says that the Shia, based on the Hadith of the Cloak, believe that this verse is about the People of the Household—Ali, Fatimah, Hasan, and Husayn.

=== Verse of the mawadda ===
In Al-Mizan, when discussing verse 23 of Surah al-Shura and the different views about it, it says that “mawaddat al-qurba” means love for the People of the Household of Muhammad—Ali, Fatimah, Hasan, and Husayn. It also mentions different narrations from both Sunni and Shia sources that clearly state this. In his commentary on this verse, al-Alusi quotes a narration from Ibn Abbas in which the Prophet is asked who the “qurba” in this verse refers to. The Prophet answers Ali, Fatimah, Hasan, and Husayn. Al-Alusi then tells the story of a Syrian man meeting Ali ibn al-Husayn, who recited this verseHe goes on to say that there are so many reports and hadiths about this verse being revealed about the People of the Household that they cannot be counted. At the end, he also mentions the Hadith of the Ark. On the other hand, in Ruh al-Ma'ani, in rejecting the Shia claim that this verse supports the Imamate of the People of the Household, it says that “mawadda” means love for the People of the Household. It says that this verse does not mean that those who must be loved must also be obeyed. In Jami' al-Bayan, al-Tabari mentions the different meanings of “qurba” and says in his commentary on the verse that it refers to the Prophet's relatives. In Tafsir al-Kabir, Fakhr al-Razi, quoting al-Zamakhshari's Tafsir al-Kashshaf, and Ibn Atiyya in Al-Muharrar al-Wajiz, say that the Prophet was asked who his relatives (qurba) were. He replied that they were Ali, Fatimah, and their two sons, Hasan and Husayn. In Tafsir al-Qur'an al-Azim, Ibn Kathir tells the story of Ali ibn al-Husayn being taken captive and a man in Damascus speaking to him. He also gives Ali ibn al-Husayn's answer about who the “qurba” in this verse refers to.

=== Other verses ===
Verse 15 of Surah al-Ahqaf talks about a pregnant woman who suffers a lot of pain and suffering. This verse is seen as a reference to Fatimah Zahra, and the child is Husayn. At that time, God comforted Muhammad about the fate of his grandson. Muhammad told Fatimah Zahra about this, and she became very upset. After God taught Zechariah the names of the Five Holy Ones, He explained the mysterious letters at the beginning of Surah Maryam — Kaf, Ha, Ya, Ayn, Sad — to Zechariah as follows: Kaf = Karbala, Ha = Halak al-Itra, Ya = Yazid, Ayn = thirst, and Sad = patience. This explanation is part of a rather complicated story. It shows a remarkable similarity between the fate of Yahya and Husayn, probably because both were beheaded and their heads were placed in a basin. When Gabriel taught Zechariah the names of the Five Holy Ones, Zechariah said each name. Each time, except when he said Husayn's name, he felt happy. But when he said Husayn's name, tears came to his eyes. Then God told Zechariah what would happen to Husayn. Zechariah cried and asked God to give him a son who would have a fate like Husayn's, so he could bear a hardship like the one Muhammad will face. God then gave Zechariah Yahya. Throughout his journey from Mecca to Karbala, Husayn remembered Yahya. Another narration says that Husayn's blood will boil like Yahya's blood, and God will kill seventy thousand hypocrites, unbelievers, and wicked believers to calm it, just as He had done to take revenge for Yahya. Other verses that Shia Muslims also relate to Husayn include verse 6 of Surah Al-Ahzab and verse 28 of Surah Al-Zukhruf, which are understood as referring to the continuation of the Imamate through his descendants. Other verses, such as verse 77 of Surah An-Nisa, verse 33 of Surah Al-Isra, and verses 27 to 30 of Surah Al-Fajr, which Shia Muslims consider the “Surah of Husayn,” refer, according to Shia belief, to Husayn's uprising and death.

== In the life of the Islamic prophet ==
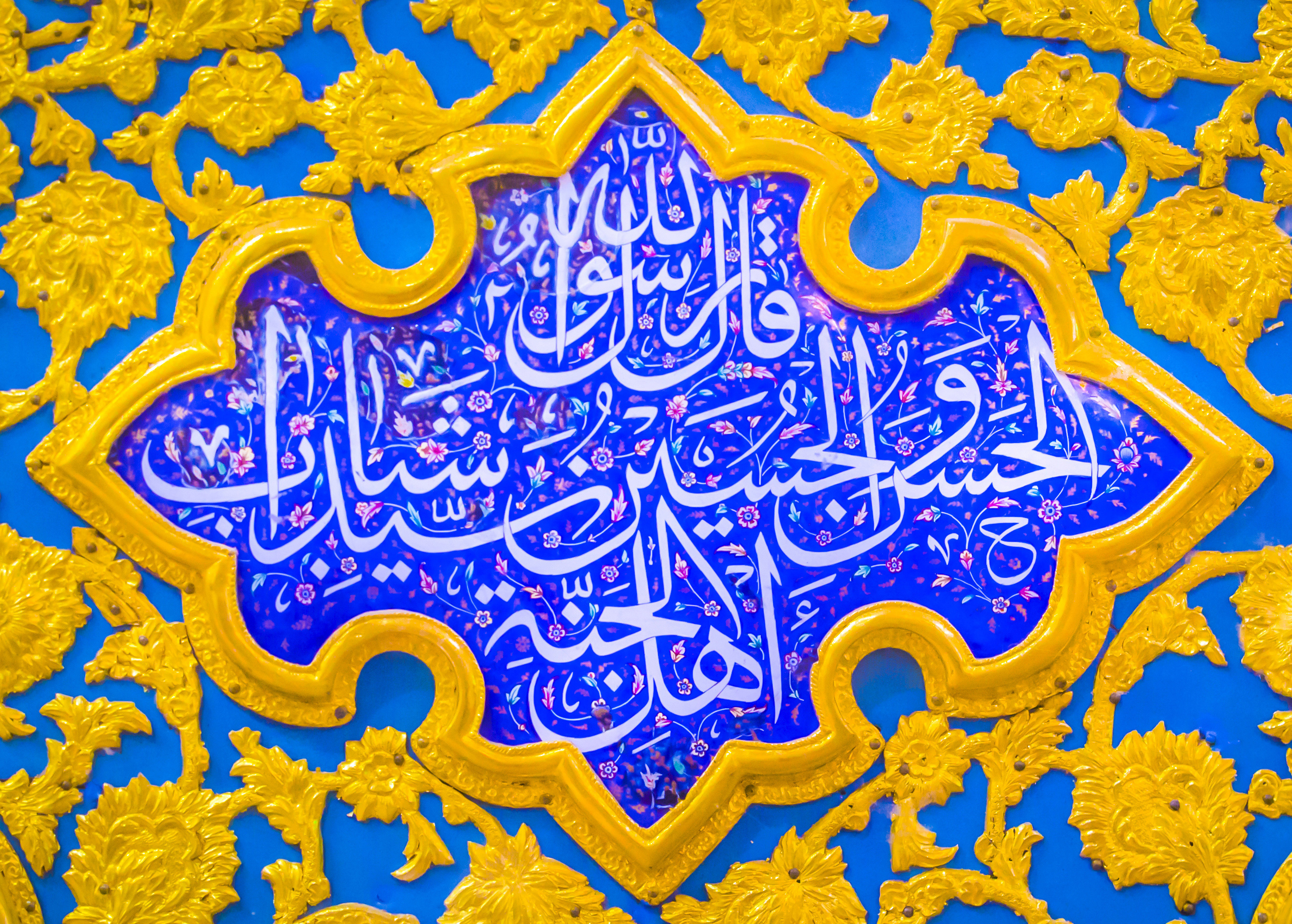
Narration of “The Leaders of the Youth of Paradise” as an inscription at the shrine of Imam Husayn

In narrations about the “Thaqalayn,” Husayn is mentioned as one of the people included in the second Thaqal. There are different narrations about the Islamic prophet's love for him. The most important one is a narration in which the Prophet prayed for those who love Husayn. In another group of narrations about Hasan and Husayn, Husayn, along with Hasan, is described as the “leader of the young people of Paradise.” His name is included among those who renewed their pledge to the Prophet. Considering the young age of Hasan and Husayn, this shows the Prophet's aim of establishing their historical and social position. This can be better understood through narrations that say they were Imams in all situations, whether they remained silent or rose up, and that they will be with the Islamic prophet on the Day of Judgment. Besides these narrations, there are two other groups of narrations from the Prophet about Husayn. The first is about the soil of Karbala and its connection to Husayn. The second is a narration from the Prophet saying that Husayn ibn Ali inherited his courage and generosity from the Prophet.

=== Knowledge of Husayn's Fate Among Earlier People ===
According to Shia belief, when Husayn was born, Gabriel told Muhammad that his community would kill Husayn and that the Imams would come from his descendants. There are many narrations saying that Muhammad had told his companions that Husayn would be killed. Besides Muhammad, Ali and Hasan had also said this. God had also told the earlier prophets about Husayn's killing. Ali also knew that Husayn would be killed in Karbala. Once, when he passed by this area, he stopped and cried, remembering Muhammad's prediction. He explained Karbala as karb (hardship) and bala (test). Those killed in Karbala will enter Paradise without being held to account.

== See also ==
- Ahl al-Bayt
- Ahl al-Kisa
- Event of the mubahala
- Hadith of the thaqalayn
- Verse of Purification
- Verse of the mawadda
- Muhammad in the Quran
- Ali in the Quran
- Ali in the Hadith
- Fatima in the Quran and Hadith
- Hasan ibn Ali in the Quran and Hadith
