= Fatima in the Quran and Hadith =

Quran verses and Hadith statements about Fatima bint Muhammad

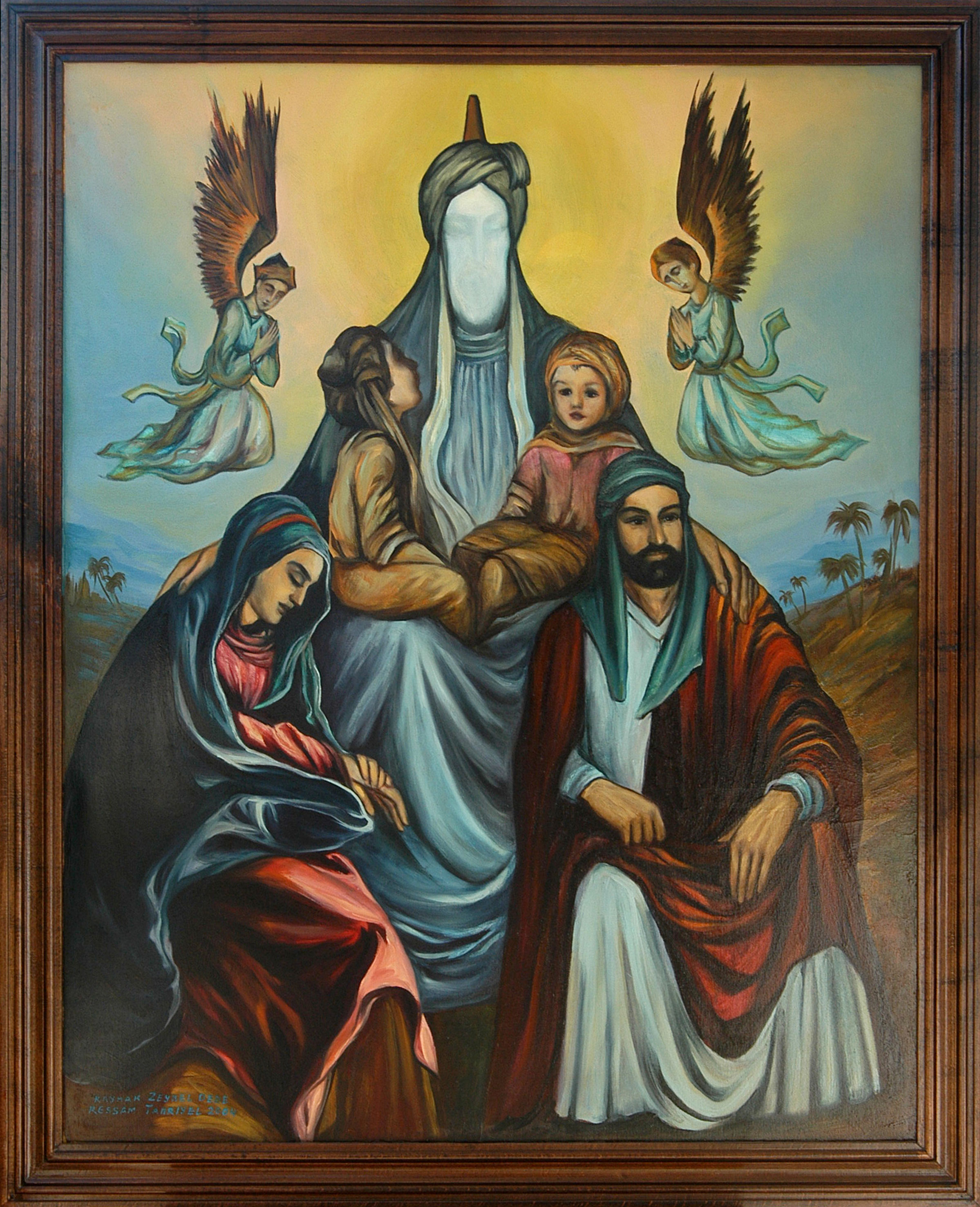
Depiction of Muhammad with Ali (his cousin and son-in-law), Fatima (his daughter) and his grandsons, Hasan and Husayn in Qajar Persia, mid-19th Century.

Although Fatima bint Muhammad is not mentioned by name in the Quran, both Sunni and Shi'a exegetical traditions have associated a number of Quranic verses with her. Estimates of the number of such verses vary considerably. Some scholars have identified around 30 verses referring to Fatima, while others have counted 60 verses across 41 surahs or as many as 135 verses in 67 surahs. These differences reflect varying interpretive approaches, including reliance on hadith reports, occasions of revelation (asbāb al-nuzūl), the application of verses to particular individuals, and esoteric or allegorical interpretation (taʾwīl and bāṭin).

== Quranic verses associated with Fatima ==
=== Surah al-Insan ===
The Shi'a exegete Muhammad Husayn Tabataba'i relates the revelation of Surah al-Insan to Ali ibn Abi Talib, Fatima, and their vow after the illness of their children, based on narrations found in both Sunni and Shi'a sources. Referring to reports on the order of Quranic revelation, the context of the verses, and other related traditions, he considers the surah to be a Medinan surah. He also discusses reports in some Sunni sources that associate the surah with a Black man who met Muhammad, rejects this attribution, and maintains that the surah was revealed concerning the Ahl al-Bayt.

Among Sunni exegetes, Shihab al-Din al-Alusi, in Ruh al-Ma'ani, recounts the narrative linking Surah al-Insan to Ali ibn Abi Talib, Fatima, and their family, while also citing reports from earlier commentators. Referring to reports attributed to al-Tirmidhi and Ibn al-Jawzi, he notes that the authenticity of the narrative has been disputed. Al-Alusi further states that, if the surah was revealed in connection with Ali and Fatima, its message is not limited to them but extends to anyone who performs similar acts of righteousness. He also remarks that, according to this interpretation, the surah does not mention the hur al-'ayn but refers only to wildānun mukhalladūn ("immortal youths"), which he describes as being out of respect for Fatima. Fakhr al-Din al-Razi, in Tafsir al-Kabir, cites the account of the illness of Ali and Fatima's children from al-Zamakhshari's al-Kashshaf and al-Wahidi's al-Basit. He argues, however, that there is no evidence for restricting these verses to Ali ibn Abi Talib, Fatima, and their children. Instead, he states that the verses apply generally to all of the righteous (al-abrar), including the pious companions of the Islamic prophet Muhammad and the righteous Tabi'un, unless it can be established that they were revealed in connection with a specific act of obedience performed by them. In his commentary on Surah al-Insan, Al-Shawkani cites several transmitted reports on the verses. Among them, he reports a narration from Ibn Mardawayh, attributed to Ibn Abbas, stating that the verse "And they give food, despite their love for it..." (Quran 76:8) was revealed concerning Ali ibn Abi Talib and Fatima, the daughter of the Muhammad.

=== Surah al-Qadr ===
In his mystical interpretation of Surah al-Qadr, Hassan Hasanzadeh Amoli interprets Fatima as the symbolic Laylat al-Qadr. He writes that night represents the descending stages of existence, while day represents the ascending stages. Quoting a narration attributed to Ja'far al-Sadiq, he says that whoever truly recognizes Fatima has understood Laylat al-Qadr. He further states that the Perfect Human (al-insan al-kamil) is the "speaking Quran" (Qur'an al-natiq). According to his interpretation, Fatima, as the mother of the Imams, is identified with the blessed Night of Power (Laylat al-Qadr), from whom the eleven "speaking Qurans" originated. Citing a saying attributed to Muhammad, he adds that whoever truly knows Fatima has attained Laylat al-Qadr. He also explains that Fatima was given this name because people are unable to fully comprehend her true nature.

=== Surah al-Kawthar ===
In Tafsir al-Mizan, Allameh Tabataba'i states that al-Kawthar means "abundant good." He notes that exegetes have given different explanations regarding what it refers to and have mentioned twenty-six possible meanings. He further states that, based on the final verse of the surah and various narrations about those who claimed that Muhammad would have no descendants, the surah refers to Fatima and her descendants, and to the continuation of Muhammad's lineage through Fatima al-Zahra. Al-Alusi also states in Ruh al-Ma'ani that one of the meanings of al-Kawthar is the abundance of the descendants of Muhammad. He then writes that the descendants of Muhammad have spread throughout the world, and he also mentions the same account discussed in Tafsir al-Mizan. Fakhr al-Razi in Tafsir al-Kabir and al-Baydawi in Anwar al-Tanzil also state that one of the meanings of al-Kawthar is the abundance of the descendants of Muhammad.

=== Verse of Mubahala ===
According to Tabataba'i, the event of Mubahala was one of the events of the early Islamic period and involved the encounter between Muhammad and his Ahl al-Bayt on one side and the Christians of Najran on the other. In this event, the Christians of Najran debated with Muhammad about the truth of his message, and the discussion eventually led to Muhammad's request for Mubahala. The two sides arrived at the place of Mubahala with their respective companions. When the Christians saw that Muhammad had come with his closest family members — ʿAli, Fatima, Hasan, and Husayn — to perform Mubahala with them, they became certain that they would not remain safe from its consequences, as Muhammad's conduct toward his family showed his confidence in his own belief. In Ruh al-Ma'ani, after describing the debate between the Christians and Muhammad regarding Jesus and Muhammad's proposal of Mubahala, al-Alusi cites the existing narrations and states that the people referred to in the verse of Mubahala are ʿAli, Fatima, Hasan, and Husayn. He further states that this indicates the superiority of the Ahl al-Bayt. Fakhr al-Razi in Tafsir al-Kabir, al-Baydawi in Anwar al-Tanzil, al-Mahalli and al-Suyuti in Tafsir al-Jalalayn, Ibn Kathir in Tafsir al-Qur'an al-Azim, and Ibn Atiyya al-Andalusi in al-Muharrar al-Wajiz also considered those present at the Mubahala to be Ali, Fatima, Hasan, and Husayn.

=== Verses of Light ===
The Verses of Light refer to verses 35 to 38 of Surah an-Nur. In the hadith discussion of these verses in Tafsir al-Mizan, narrations are cited that identify the referent of these verses as the Ahl al-Bayt of Muhammad and interpret the "Mishkat" (niche) as Fatima al-Zahra. It is also stated that the "houses" mentioned in these verses refer to the houses of the prophets, and that the house of Ali and Fatima is one of them. In Ruh al-Ma'ani, while explaining verse 36, al-Alusi cites a narration stating that the "houses" mentioned in the verse are the houses of the prophets. Ibn Maghazili in Manaqib narrates a hadith from Musa al-Kazim stating that Fatima al-Zahra is the referent of "Mishkat" and "a shining star" (kawkabun durriyy).

=== Verse of Purification ===
In Tafsir al-Mizan, Allameh Tabataba'i discusses the verse of purification in detail and considers its addressees to be the Ahl al-Kisa. He refers to more than seventy hadiths about this verse, most of which are transmitted through Sunni sources. In Sunni sources, the narrators of these hadiths include Umm Salama, Aisha, Abu Sa'id al-Khudri, Sa'd, Wathila ibn al-Asqa', Abu al-Hamra, Ibn Abbas, Thawban (the freed servant of Muhammad), Abdullah ibn Ja'far, Ali ibn Abi Talib, and Hasan ibn Ali. Nearly forty chains of transmission have been narrated from them. In Shi'a sources, the narrators include Ali ibn Abi Talib, Ali ibn al-Husayn, Muhammad al-Baqir, Ja'far al-Sadiq, Ali ibn Musa al-Rida, Umm Salama, Abu Dharr, Abu Layla, Abu al-Aswad al-Du'ali, Amr ibn Maymun al-Awdi, and Sa'd ibn Abi Waqqas. More than thirty chains of transmission have been narrated from them. In his Ruh al-Ma'ani, al-Alusi mentions different narrations about who is meant by Ahl al-Bayt in this verse and refers to the Hadith al-Kisa, considering Ahl al-Bayt to be the Ahl al-Kisa. However, in his later discussion of infallibility and purity, after presenting and rejecting the Shi'a view, he does not accept the infallibility and purity of the Ahl al-Bayt. He considers this verse to express a condition, rather than a statement describing something that has already taken place. In Jami' al-Bayan, al-Tabari cites many hadiths that consider this verse to refer to Ali, Fatima, Hasan, and Husayn. He states that some people believe that these are the ones meant by the Ahl al-Bayt of Muhammad. Baydawi says in his book Anwar al-Tanzil that the Shiites believe this verse is about Ali, Fatima, and their two sons. He says that they use this verse as evidence for the infallibility of the Ahl al-Bayt, but he argues that this does not fit with the verses before and after it, and that these hadiths only show that they are considered part of the Ahl al-Bayt of Muhammad. In Tafsir al-Kabir, Fakhr al-Razi says that there are different opinions about who is meant by Ahl al-Bayt in this verse. However, he considers the more accepted view to be that Ahl al-Bayt refers to the descendants of Muhammad, Fatima, his wives, Hasan, Husayn, and Ali. Ibn Kathir in Tafsir al-Qur'an al-Azim mentions the hadith of Muhammad standing at Fatima's house for six months, calling the Ahl al-Bayt to prayer and Hadith al-Kisa. In al-Muharrar al-Wajiz, Ibn Atiyya refers to a hadith from Muhammad and says that this verse was revealed regarding Muhammad, Ali, Fatima, Hasan, and Husayn. In Ta'wilat Ahl al-Sunna, al-Maturidi says that the Shiites, based on the Hadith al-Kisa, consider this verse to be about the Ahl al-Bayt: Ali, Fatima, Hasan, and Husayn.

=== Verse of Mawadda ===
In Tafsir al-Mizan, Allameh Tabataba'i discusses the different interpretations of verse 23 of Surah ash-Shura. He says that "Mawaddat al-Qurba" refers to love for Muhammad's Ahl al-Bayt—Ali, Fatima, Hasan, and Husayn. He also cites various Sunni and Shi'a narrations that explicitly identify them as the intended meaning. In his commentary on this verse, al-Alusi cites a narration from Ibn Abbas in which Muhammad is asked who is meant by "al-Qurba" in the verse. Muhammad answers that it refers to Ali, Fatima, Hasan, and Husayn. Al-Alusi then recounts the story of a Syrian man who met Ali ibn al-Husayn, during which Ali ibn al-Husayn recited this verse. He goes on to say that there are numerous reports and hadiths stating that the verse was revealed about the Ahl al-Bayt. Elsewhere in Ruh al-Ma'ani, while rejecting the Shi'a view that this verse establishes the imamate of the Ahl al-Bayt, he says that "mawadda" means love for the Ahl al-Bayt and that the verse does not mean that someone who is to be loved must also be an imam or must be obeyed. In Jami' al-Bayan, al-Tabari discusses the different meanings of al-Qurba and says that it refers to Muhammad's relatives. Fakhr al-Razi in Tafsir al-Kabir, quoting al-Zamakhshari's al-Kashshaf, and Ibn Atiyya in al-Muharrar al-Wajiz say that Muhammad was asked who was meant by his relatives (al-Qurba), and he replied that they were Ali, Fatima, and their two sons, Hasan and Husayn. In Tafsir al-Qur'an al-Azim, Ibn Kathir recounts the story of Ali ibn al-Husayn after he was brought to Damascus as a captive. In the account, a man from Damascus asks whether Ali ibn al-Husayn and his family are the ones referred to as al-Qurba, and Ali ibn al-Husayn replies that they are.

== In the Hadith ==
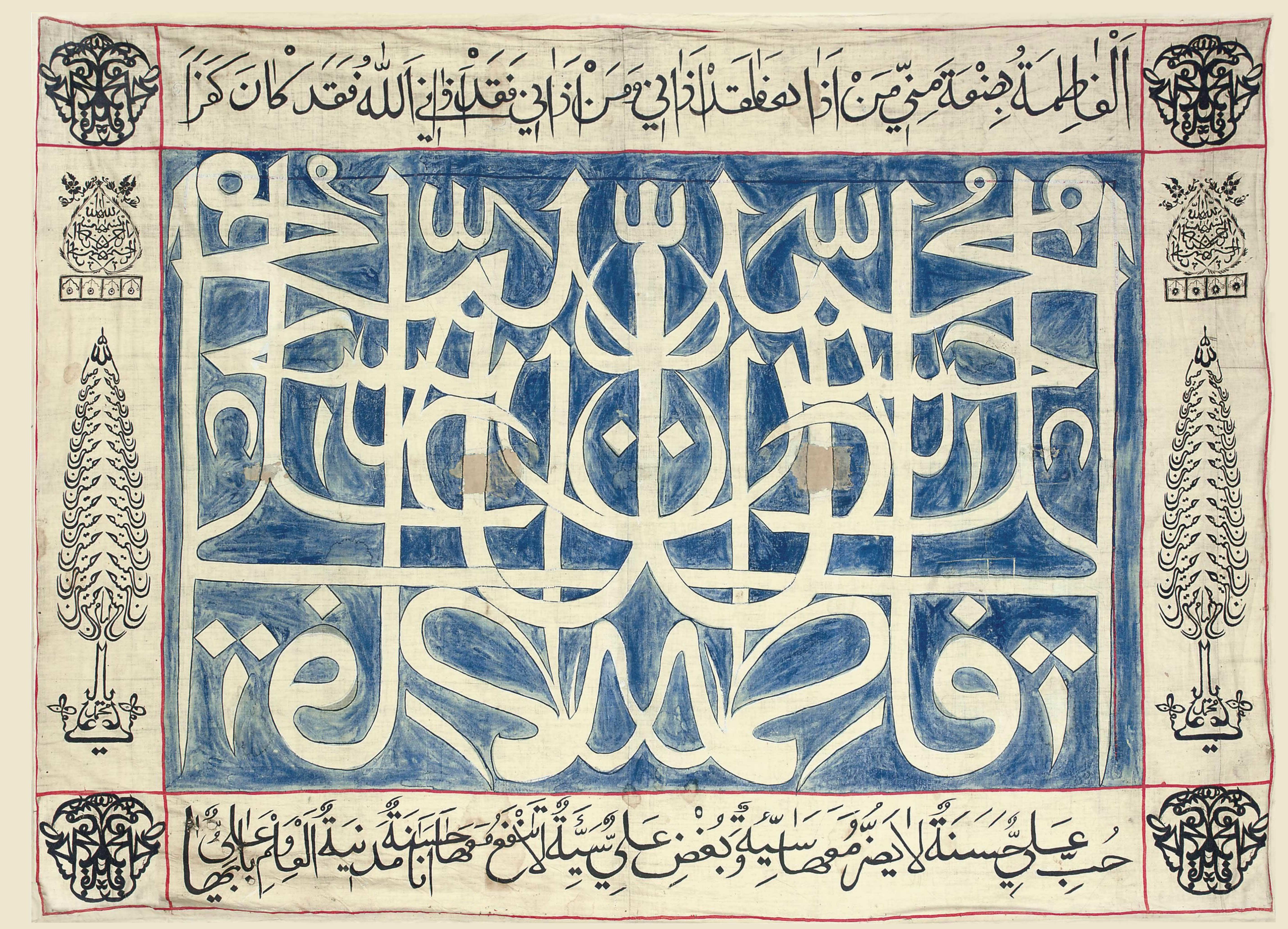
Cloth bearing the names of the Ahl al-Kisa and two hadiths attributed to Muhammad, probably produced in Iran or Central Asia during the 13th century AH.

On the eve of the emergence of Islam, Arabia was a dry land with a harsh climate, difficult living conditions, and a harsh culture. In that society, women had little social standing and were often regarded as a source of shame for their families, to the extent that some nomadic Arabs buried their infant daughters alive. In such a society, Muhammad's treatment of Fatima stood in contrast to the cultural norms of Arabia.

Muhammad's hadiths about Fatima fall into two categories. The first includes hadiths that are specifically about Fatima, while the second consists of hadiths about his Ahl al-Bayt, which also include Fatima. Some of the best-known hadiths in this second group are the Hadith of the Ark (Hadith al-Safina), the Hadith of the Stars (Hadith al-Nujum), and the Hadith of the Two Weighty Things (Hadith al-Thaqalayn).

=== Hadith of Baḍʿah ===
The Hadith of Baḍʿah is one of the most well-known hadiths and is regarded as mutawatir in meaning. It has been narrated in 28 different versions in many Sunni and Shi'a books, including at least 18 Sunni and 13 Shi'a sources. Several accounts have been reported about the circumstances in which this hadith was spoken. These include: first, Muhammad asking Ali about the best thing for women, after which Ali asked Fatima for the answer; second, Fatima untying Abu Lubabah al-Ansari after his repentance was accepted; third, an occasion when Muhammad introduced Fatima; fourth, Muhammad saying these words to Ali on the night of his marriage to Fatima; and fifth, the account narrated by al-Miswar ibn Makhrama about Ali's reported proposal to Abu Jahl's daughter. In a study of this hadith in Sunni sources, Muhammad Ja'far al-Tabasi lists 123 sources for the Hadith of Baḍʿah and argues that the fifth account is not authentic.

Most Sunni sources narrate this hadith only through al-Miswar ibn Makhramah or Abdullah ibn al-Zubayr, either in connection with the story of Ali's reported proposal or without mentioning the occasion on which the hadith was spoken. They do not mention the other accounts. Among the best-known sources are Kanz al-Ummal by al-Muttaqi al-Hindi, Dhakha'ir al-'Uqba by Muhibb al-Din al-Tabari, al-Mu'jam al-Kabir by al-Tabarani, al-Khasa'is al-Kubra by al-Suyuti, Siyar A'lam al-Nubala' and al-Muntaqa min Minhaj al-I'tidal by al-Dhahabi, Amali by Abu Nu'aym al-Isfahani, al-Matalib al-'Aliyah by Ibn Hajar al-'Asqalani, and al-Sawa'iq al-Muhriqah by Ibn Hajar al-Haytami.

=== Hadith of Sayyidat Nisa' al-'Alamin ===
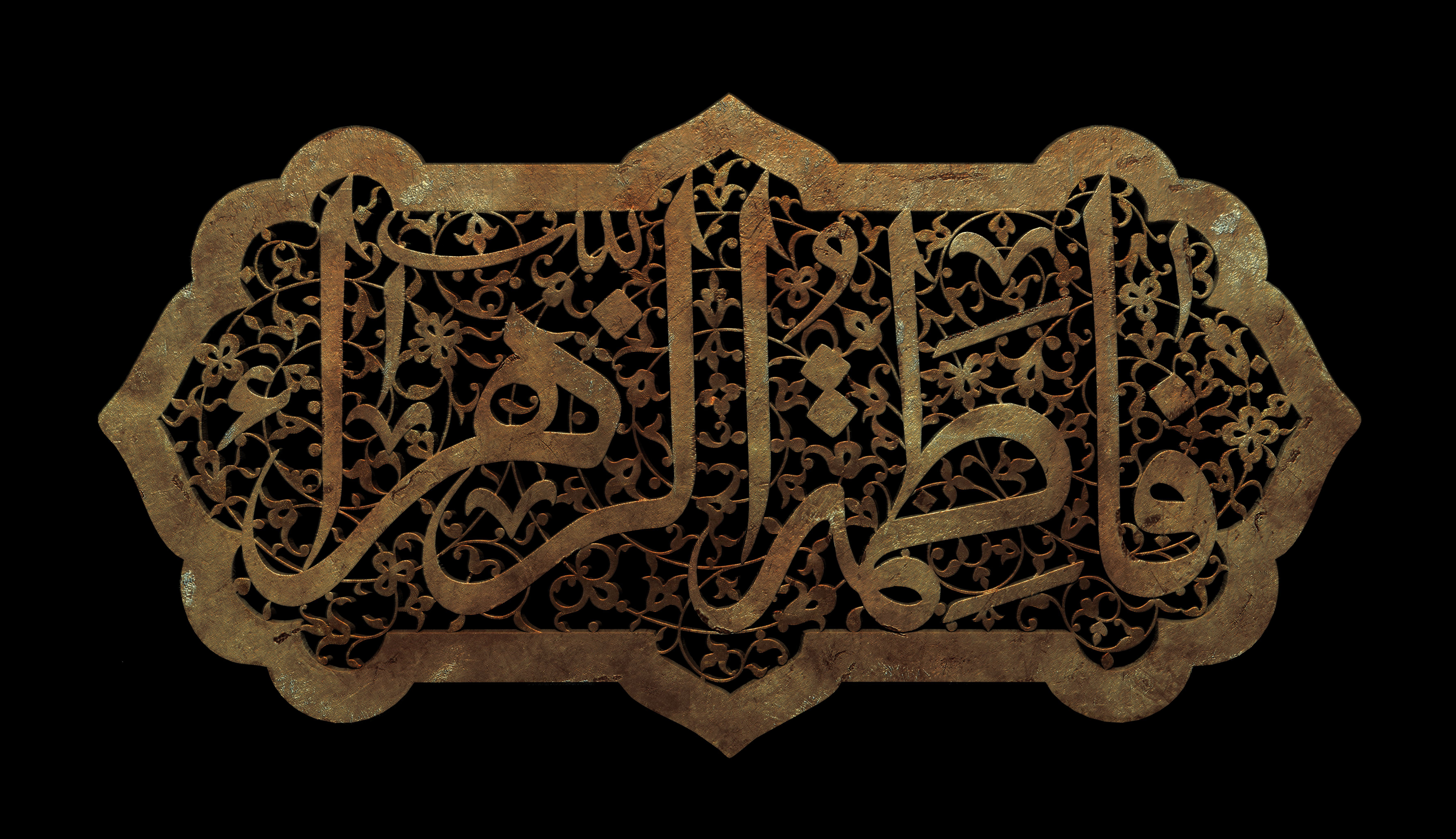
Reconstructed version of the name of Fatimah al-Zahra in thuluth calligraphy, based on a Safavid-period steel openwork panel. The reconstruction was produced by the Center for Shia Arts of Iran. The original is preserved in the Aga Khan Museum in Toronto, Canada.

The Hadith of "Sayyidat al-Nisa' al-'Alamin" is another hadith that describes Fatima as the leader of the women of the worlds. The hadith is narrated by Ali ibn Abi Talib, Fatima, Ibn Abbas, Anas ibn Malik, Abu Layla, Abu Hurayrah, Aisha, Abd al-Rahman ibn Abi Layla, Jabir ibn Abd Allah al-Ansari, Abu Sa'id al-Khudri, Hudhayfah ibn al-Yaman, Umm Salama, Abu al-Aslami, Abd Allah ibn Mas'ud, Abd Allah ibn Umar, Imran ibn Husayn, Jabir ibn Samurah, and Abu Buraydah al-Aslami. Sunni and Shi'a sources report that Muhammad described Fatima as the leader of the women of all the worlds. Some sources state that she is the leader of the women of Paradise, except for Mary, while others describe her as the leader of the women of all the worlds. Al-Hakim al-Nishapuri and al-Dhahabi, two prominent Sunni hadith scholars, considered this narration authentic. Some Sunni scholars, including al-Alusi, Abd al-Rahman al-Suhayli, Muhammad ibn Abd al-Baqi al-Zurqani, al-Saffarini, Ibn al-Jakni, Shaykh al-Rifa'i, and Muhammad Tahir al-Qadri, highlighted the virtues of Fatima. Shi'a hadith and tafsir sources also contain many narrations about this subject. Muhibb al-Din al-Tabari, in Dhakha'ir al-'Uqba, narrates a hadith from Muhammad in which Mary, the daughter of Imran, Khadijah bint Khuwaylid, Fatima bint Muhammad, and Asiyah, the wife of Pharaoh, are mentioned as the four best women of the worlds. In the same section, he also narrates the account of Muhammad visiting Fatima during her illness, along with other narrations from Muhammad that describe Fatima as the "best among the women of the world" or the "leader of the women of the world."

Al-Dhahabi, in Siyar A'lam al-Nubala', also narrates these two hadiths along with another hadith that uses the phrase "the best of the women of the worlds." In Tarikh al-Islam, he also repeats the two hadiths cited by al-Tabari, along with the hadiths he mentioned in Siyar A'lam al-Nubala'. Ibn Asakir, in Tarikh Madinat Dimashq, narrates the hadith about Muhammad visiting Fatima during her illness, in which Fatima is described as the "foremost of the women of the world."

Al-Suyuti, in Al-Durr al-Manthur, also mentions the hadiths cited by al-Tabari in Dhakha'ir al-'Uqba, along with other hadiths. In Fath al-Bari, Ibn Hajar al-Asqalani narrates hadiths from Muhammad in which Fatima is described as the "foremost of the women of the world" and the "foremost of the women of Paradise," except for Mary. In Al-Bidaya wa al-Nihaya, Ibn Kathir also narrates hadiths stating that the four best women of the world, or the four foremost women of the world, are Fatima bint Muhammad, Khadijah bint Khuwaylid, Asiyah bint Muzahim, and Maryam bint Imran. Al-Muttaqi al-Hindi, in Kanz al-Ummal, narrates hadiths in which Fatima is referred to as the "foremost of the women of the world" and the "foremost of the women of Paradise." Ibn al-Athir, in Usd al-Ghaba, narrates hadiths in which Muhammad, during his final illness, tells Fatima that she is "the foremost of the women of the world" or "the foremost of the women of Paradise" as she wept over the thought of losing her father. Abu Nu'aym al-Isfahani, in Hilyat al-Awliya', narrates a hadith about Muhammad visiting Fatima during her illness, in which Fatima is described as the "foremost of the women of the world" or the "foremost of the women on the Day of Judgment."

=== Narrations by Shi'a Imams ===
Hadiths about Fatima are also narrated from the Shi'a Imams. These narrations describe different aspects of her life and virtues, including her knowledge, her modesty, Muhammad's love for her, her frequent crying, her avoidance of wrongdoing, her status as the foremost of the women of the world, her communication with angels, her concern for others in prayer, her uniqueness, the belief that no one on earth was equal to her except Ali ibn Abi Talib, as well as her role as a wife and her efforts in managing household affairs. Other hadiths also emphasize specific aspects of Fatima, such as her being described as truthful (siddiqah) and a martyr (shahidah), her status as a proof (hujjah) for the Shi'a Imams, and her being regarded as a role model for al-Hujjah ibn al-Hasan, the twelfth Shi'a Imam.

== See also ==
- Ahl al-Bayt
- Hadith of the Cloak
- Event of Mubahala
- Ahl al-Kisa
- Hadith of the thaqalayn
- Muhammad in the Quran
- Ali in the Quran
- Ali in the Hadith
- Hasan ibn Ali in the Quran and Hadith
- Husayn ibn Ali in the Quran and Hadith
