= Hadith of the thaqalayn =

Islamic narration

The hadith of the thaqalayn (Arabic: حديث الثقلين, lit. 'saying of the two weighty things') refers to a statement, attributed to the Islamic prophet Muhammad, that introduces the Quran, the principal religious text in Islam, and his progeny as the only two sources of divine guidance after his death. Widely reported by both Shia and Sunni authorities, the hadith of the thaqalayn is of particular significance in Twelver Shia, where their Twelve Imams are viewed as the spiritual and political successors of Muhammad.

== Hadith of the thaqalayn ==
There exist several versions of this hadith in Sunni sources.

The version emphasizing the progeny of Muhammad, which forms the central foundation of Shia doctrine, appears in the Musnad Ahmad ibn Hanbal and Sahih Muslim:

"I [Muhammad] left among you two treasures which, if you cling to them, you shall not be led into error after me. One of them is greater than the other: The book of God (Quran), which is a rope stretched from Heaven to Earth, and [the second one is] my progeny, my Ahl al-Bayt. These two shall not be parted until they return to the pool [of abundance in paradise, kawthar." —

In contrast, another widely cited Sunni narration—frequently prioritized in mainstream Sunni sermonics and jurisprudence—substitutes the progeny with the Prophet's practice (Sunnah), as recorded in the Muwatta Malik:

"I have left two matters with you. As long as you hold fast to them, you will not go astray: the Book of God (Quran) and the Sunna of His Prophet." — 'Muwatta Malik'

Muhammad might have repeated this statement on multiple occasions, including his Farewell Pilgrimage and later at the Ghadir Khumm, shortly before he died in 632. The version of this hadith in Al-Sunan al-kubra, another Sunni hadith collection, adds the warning, "Be careful how you treat the two [treasures] after me." Similar versions of the hadith can be found in other major Sunni sources, including Sahih Muslim, Sahih al-Tirmidhi, and Sunan al-Darimi. According to the Twelver Shi'a theologian Muhammad Husayn Tabataba'i (d. 1981), the hadith of the thaqalayn has been transmitted through more than a hundred channels by over thirty-five Companions of the Prophet.

Shia Islam limits the Ahl al-Bayt to the Ahl al-Kisa, namely, Muhammad, his daughter Fatima, her husband Ali, and their two sons, Hasan and Husayn. In Shia theology works, the Ahl al-Bayt often also includes the remaining Shia imams. There are various interpretations in Sunni Islam, though a typical compromise is to include Muhammad's wives in the Ahl al-Bayt, in addition to the Ahl al-Kisa. In some Sunni versions of the hadith, however, ahl al-bayt has been replaced with sunna; that is, practices of Muhammad.

This divergence in wording reflects a fundamental theological distinction: while mainstream Sunni jurisprudence considers the "Quran and Sunnah" formula as the normative model for religious guidance, Shia theology treats the "Quran and Ahl al-Bayt" version (*Hadith al-Thaqalayn*) as the primary scriptural foundation establishing the spiritual authority (Wilayah) and divine guidance of the Imams alongside the Quran.

== Significance in Sunni Islam ==
Some Sunni versions of the hadith of the thaqalayn replace ahl al-bayt with sunna, that is, practices of Muhammad. This change is either intended to challenge the Shia implications of the hadith, or, if authentic, may imply that the ahl al-bayt of Muhammad are a source of his sunna. Muhammad is indeed viewed as the 'living Quran', the embodiment of God's will in his behavior and words. Both Sunni and Shia Muslims uphold the Quran and the sunna of Muhammad, though Shia extends the sunna to also include the traditions and practices of their imams.

== Significance in Twelver Shi'ism ==
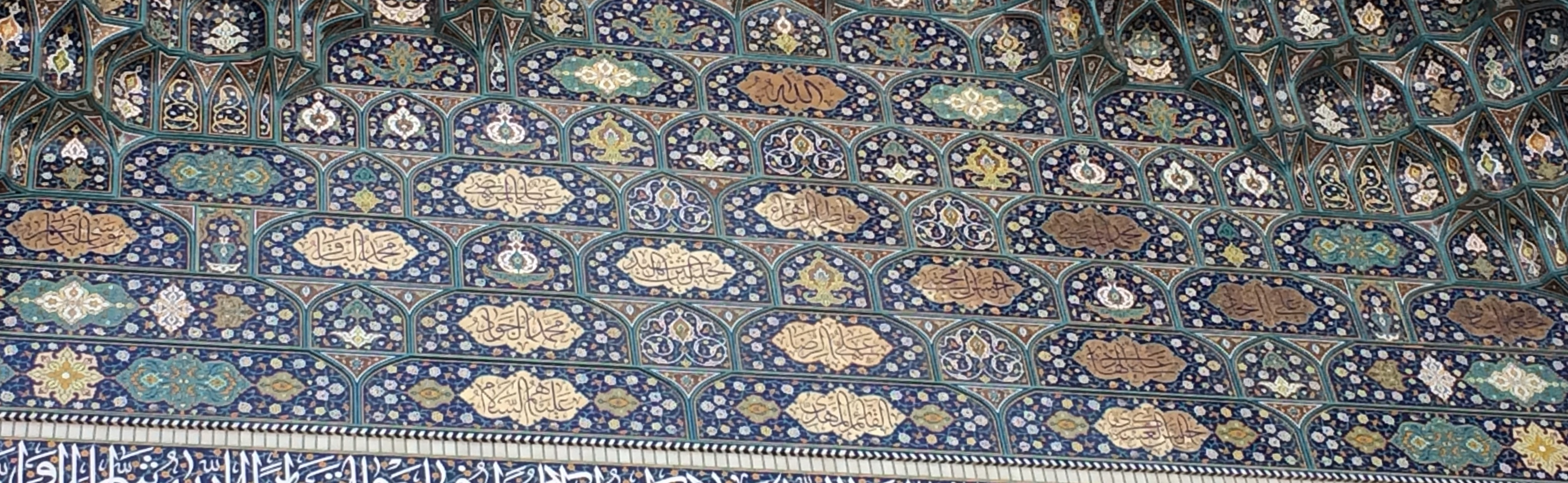
Names of Muhammad, his daughter Fatima, and the Twelve Imams, inscribed on the tilework of the Imam Reza shrine dedicated to the eighth of the Twelve Imams, Mashhad, Iran

In Twelver Shi'ism, the hadith of the thaqalayn establishes a parallel between the Quran and the family of Muhammad, implying that the two serve as the only sources of divine guidance after Muhammad. The hadith also implicitly describes (some) descendants of Muhammad as the true interpreters of the Quran, and those descendants are viewed as the living embodiments of the Quran in Twelver Shi'ism. As divine guides, those descendants must also be infallible lest they lead their followers astray. The hadith also implies that Earth is never void of a descendant of Muhammad, an infallible imam, who serves as the divine guide of humankind in his time. These are the Twelve Imams in Twelver Shi'ism. The last of these imams, Muhammad al-Mahdi, is believed to remain miraculously in occultation since 874 and is expected to return in the end of times to eradicate injustice and evil.

The belief in the Mahdi remains popular among all Muslims, possibly owing to numerous traditions to this effect in canonical Sunni and Shia sources.

== See also ==
- Ahl al-Bayt
- Ahl al-Kisa
- Ghadir Khumm
- Hadith of the ark
- Hadith of the twelve successors
- Fatima in the Quran and Hadith
- Hadith of Jabir
- Hasan ibn Ali in the Quran and Hadith
- Husayn ibn Ali in the Quran and Hadith
