= Ahl al-Kisa =

Islamic prophet Muhammad and four members of his family

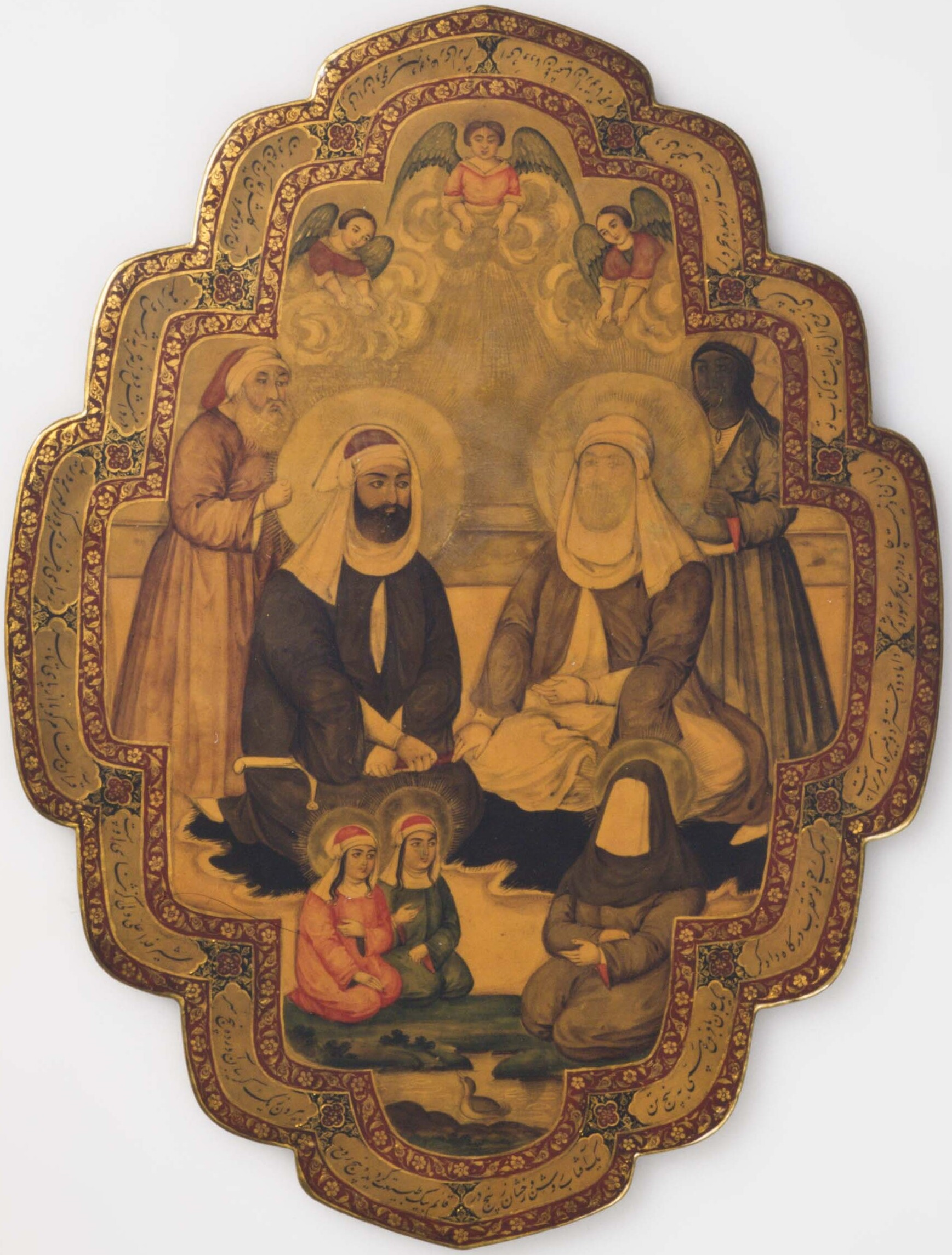
19th century artwork from Isfahan depicting the Ahl al-Kisa.

Ahl al-Kisa (Arabic: أَهْل ٱلْكِسَاء, romanized: ʾAhl al-Kisāʾ, lit. 'People of The Cloak' ), also known as the Al al-Aba (Arabic: آل ٱلْعَبَاء, romanized: ʾĀl al-ʿabāʾ, lit. 'Family of The Cloak' ), are the Islamic prophet Muhammad, his daughter Fatima, his cousin and son-in-law Ali, and their two sons Hasan and Husayn. The name is associated with the Hadith of the Cloak and the Event of Mubahala, both of which are widely reported in Sunni and Shia sources. Muhammad gathered Ali, Fatima, Hasan, and Husayn under his cloak and identified them as members of his family (Ahl al-Bayt). He then prayed to God to purify and bless them, emphasizing their special spiritual status and closeness to him.

Ali, Hasan, and Husayn are the first three Shia Imams and rightful successors of Muhammad. Shia Muslims regard them as infallible and emphasize their suffering and martyrdom. Sunni Muslims likewise honor them as members of Muhammad’s family (Ahl al-Bayt) and hold them in very high esteem. However, Sunnis generally emphasize their virtue, closeness to Muhammad, and moral excellence rather than regarding them as divinely appointed religious leaders.

== Origins of the name ==
=== Hadith of the kisa ===
According to the hadith of the kisa, on one occasion at least, Muhammad gathered his daughter Fatima, her husband Ali, and their two sons Hasan and Husayn under his cloak and then prayed, "O God, these are my ahl al-bayt (lit. 'the people of my house') and my closest family members; remove defilement from them and purify them completely," where this last statement is a reference to verse 33:33 of the Quran, known also as the verse of purification. These five have thus become known as the Ahl al-Kisa (lit. 'people of the cloak').

Variants of this tradition can be found in Sahih Muslim, Sunan al-Tirmidhi, and Musnad Ahmad ibn Hanbal, all canonical collections in Sunni Islam. Other versions are reported by the Sunni scholars ibn Kathir (d. 1373), al-Wahidi (d. 1075), Qadi Baydawi (d. 1319), al-Baghawi (d. 1122), al-Suyuti (d. 1505), al-Hakim al-Nishapuri (d. 1014), and al-Tabari (d. 923), and by the Twelver Shi'a exegete Muhammad Husayn Tabataba'i (d. 1981), among many others.

=== Event of the mubāhala ===
After an inconclusive discussion about Jesus between Muhammad and a delegation from the Christian community of Najran, both parties decided to engage in mubāhala, where they would pray to invoke God's curse upon whoever was the liar. Linked to this ordeal is verse 3:61 of the Quran, also known as the "verse of the mubahala", which instructed Muhammad:

And to whomsoever disputes with thee over it, after the knowledge that has come unto thee [about Jesus], say, "Come! Let us call upon our sons and your sons, our women and your women, ourselves and yourselves. Then let us pray earnestly, so as to place the curse of God upon those who lie."

The delegation withdrew from the challenge and negotiated for peace.

The majority of reports indicate that Muhammad appeared for the occasion of the mubāhala accompanied by Ali, Fatima, Hasan, and Husayn. Such reports are presented by the early scholars ibn Ishaq (d. 767), Fakhr al-Din al-Razi (d. 1209), Muslim ibn al-Hajjaj (d. 875), al-Hakim al-Nishapuri (d. 1014), and ibn Kathir (d. 1373), among others. Some traditions about the mubāhala add that Muhammad, Ali, Fatima, Hasan, and Husayn stood under Muhammad's cloak.

== In the Quran ==
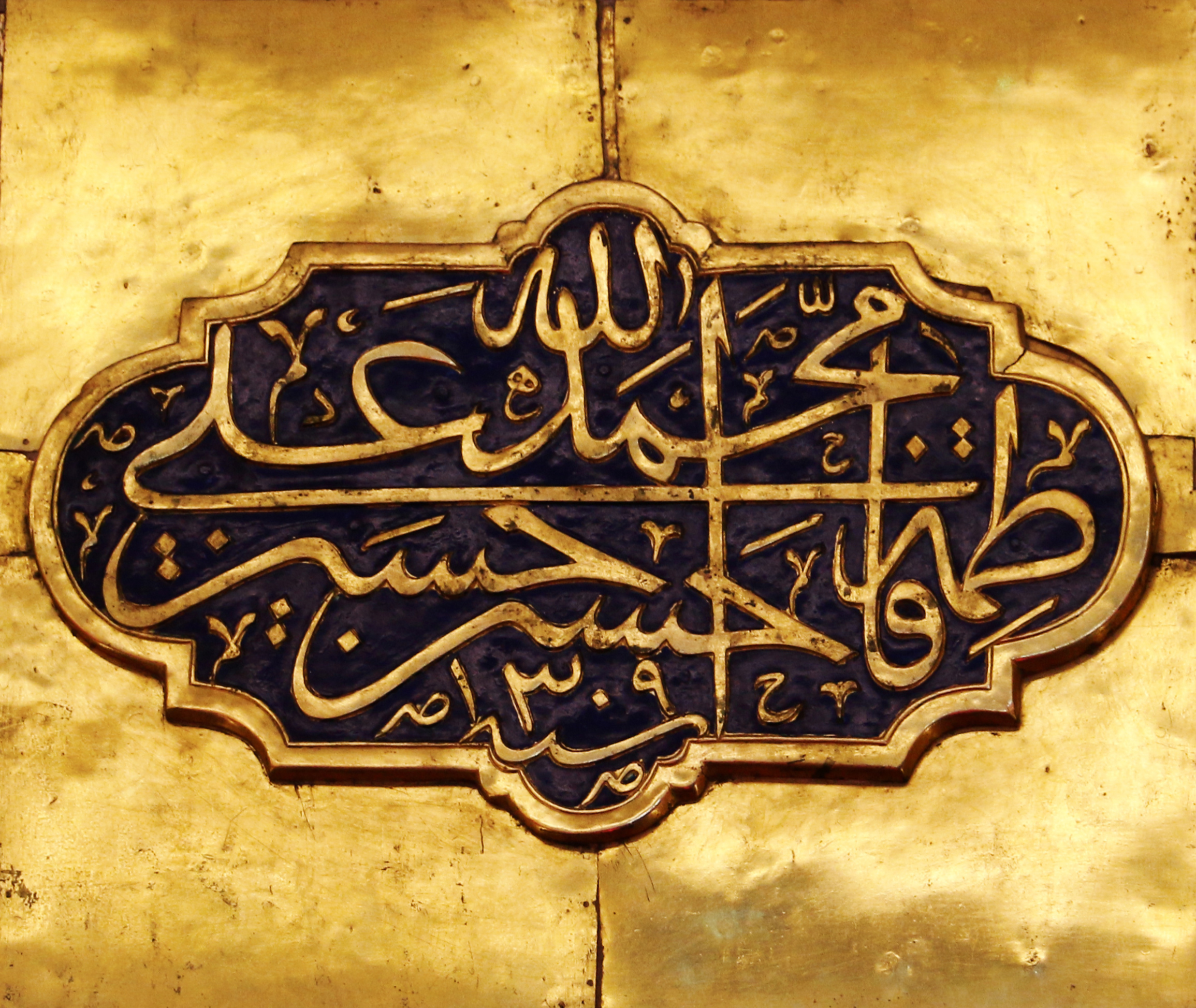
Names of the Ahl al-Kisa, inscribed at the Al-Abbas Shrine in Karbala.

Families of the past prophets hold a prominent position in the Quran. Therein, their descendants become spiritual and material heirs to keep their fathers' covenants intact. Muhammad's close kin are also mentioned in the Quran in various contexts.

=== Verse of purification ===
Also known as the verse of purification, the last passage of verse 33:33 reads, "God only desires to remove defilement from you, O Ahl al-Bayt, and to purify you completely." Muslims disagree as to who belongs to the Ahl al-Bayt (lit. 'people of the house'). Shia Islam limits the Ahl al-Bayt to the Ahl al-Kisa, namely, Muhammad, Fatima, Ali, Hasan and Husayn. The verse of purification is thus regarded in Shia Islam as evidence of the infallibility of the Ahl al-Kisa. Shias also believe in the redemptive power of the pain and martyrdom endured by the Ahl al-Bayt (particularly by Husayn) for those who empathize with their divine cause and suffering. There are various views in Sunni Islam, though a typical compromise is to also include Muhammad's wives in the Ahl al-Bayt.

=== Verse of the mawadda ===
Known as the verse of the mawadda (lit. 'affection' or 'love'), verse 42:23 of the Quran contains the passage, "[O Mohammad!] Say, 'I ask not of you any reward for it, save affection among kinsfolk.'" The Shia-leaning historian ibn Ishaq narrates that Muhammad specified that the relatives في القربى) in this verse are Ali, Fatima, and their two sons, Hasan and Husayn. This is also the view of some Sunni scholars, including al-Razi, Baydawi, and ibn al-Maghazli. Most Sunni authors, however, reject the Shia view and offer various alternatives; chief among them is that this verse enjoins love for kin in general.

=== Verses 76:5–22 ===
Verses 76:5-22 are connected to the Ahl al-Kisa in most Shia and some Sunni sources, including the works of the Shia exegete al-Tabarsi (d. 1153), and the Sunni scholars al-Qurtubi (d. 1273) and al-Alusi (d. 1854). According to these authors, verses 76:5–22 were revealed to Muhammad after Ali, Fatima, Hasan, Husayn, and their maidservant Fidda gave away their only meal of the day to beggars who visited their home, for three consecutive days. In particular, verses 76:7–12 read,

They fulfill their vows and fear a day whose evil is widespread, and give food, despite loving it, to the indigent, the orphan, and the captive. "We feed you only for the Face of God. We do not desire any recompense or thanks from you. Truly we fear from our Lord a grim, calamitous day." So God has shielded them from the evil of that Day, bestowed upon them radiance and joy, and rewarded them for having been patient with a Garden and with silk.

== See also ==
- Ahl al-Bayt
- Cloak of Muhammad – Cloak believed to have been worn by the founder of Islam
- Hadith of the thaqalayn
- Hadith of the ark
- Fatima in the Quran and Hadith
- Hasan ibn Ali in the Quran and Hadith
- Husayn ibn Ali in the Quran and Hadith
