= Ali in the Hadith =

Hadith statements about Ali ibn Abi Talib

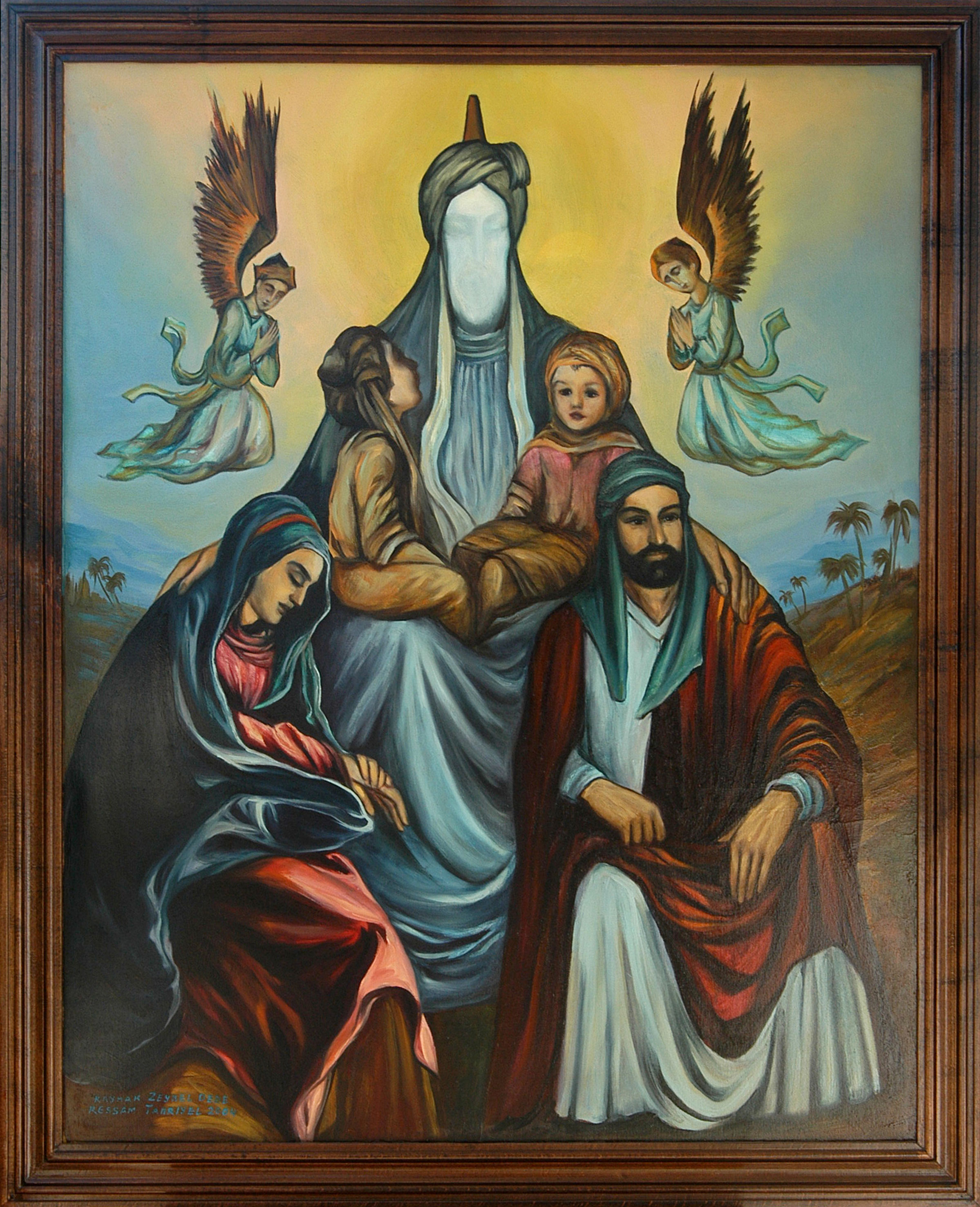
Depiction of Muhammad with Ali (his cousin and son-in-law), Fatima (his daughter) and his grandsons, Hasan and Husayn in Qajar Persia, mid-19th Century.

Ali in hadith literature collects some of the statements about Ali ibn Abi Talib, attributed to the Islamic prophet Muhammad. Ali was the cousin and son-in-law of Muhammad, also recognized as the fourth Rashidun caliph in Sunni Islam and the first imam in Shia Islam. The two men enjoyed a close relationship, for Ali was raised in Muhammad's household as a child and a young Ali later played a pivotal role in the formative years of Islam. The most controversial such prophetic saying (hadith) was delivered at the Ghadir Khumm in 632 CE and gave Ali the same spiritual authority (walaya) as Muhammad, according to the Shia.

== Prophetic statements about Ali ==
=== Hadith of the walaya ===
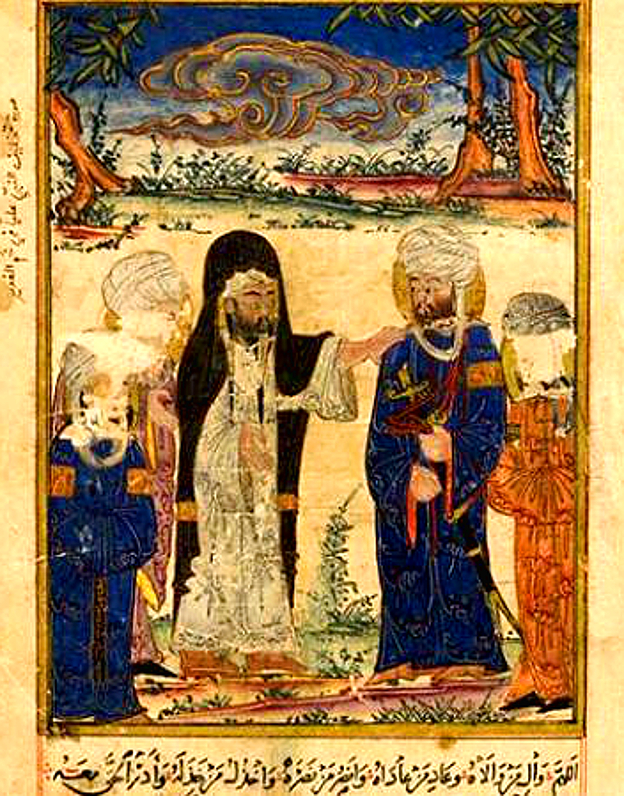
Artwork depicting the Ghadir Khumm, where Muhammad uttered the statement, "He whose mawla I am, Ali is his mawla."

Muhammad's statement at the Ghadir Khumm, "He whose mawla I am, Ali is his mawla," is known as the hadith of the walaya in Shia Islam. Delivered to a large crowd of pilgrims, shortly after the Farewell Pilgrimage and shortly before his death in 632 CE, the attribution of this statement to Muhammad is rarely contested, even though its interpretation is a source of controversy.

In this context, Shia sources interpret the word mawla as meaning 'leader', 'master', and 'patron', while Sunni accounts often interpret the hadith as a statement of love or support. Shias therefore view the Ghadir Khumm as the investiture of Ali with Muhammad's religious and political authority (walaya), while Sunnis regard the event as an indication of the rapport between the two men, or that Ali should execute Muhammad's will. Shias point to the extraordinary nature of the announcement, offer Quranic and textual evidence, and argue by means of eliminating the other meanings of mawla in the hadith except for authority, while Sunnis minimize the importance of the Ghadir Khumm by casting it as a simple response to earlier complaints about Ali.

=== Hadith of the position ===
Reported by canonical Sunni and Shia sources, the hadith of the position reads, "Are you not content, Ali, to stand to me [Muhammad] as Aaron stood to Moses, except that there will be no prophet after me?" In Shia Islam, this hadith is invoked to prove Ali's usurped right to succeed Muhammad. In Sunni Islam, the hadith primarily supports the belief in the finality of Muhammad in the chain of prophets. In turn, Sunni scholars consider the hadith of the position irrelevant to Muhammad's succession because Aaron died before Moses, while Shia authors counter that had Aaron survived Moses, the former would have indeed succeeded the latter. Alternatively, some Sunni scholars have limited the scope of the hadith of the position to imply only the temporary deputyship, while the Shia counterargument is that this interpretation would have made redundant Muhammad's exclusion of Ali from prophethood.

=== Hadith of the warning ===
The hadith of the warning describes how Muhammad made his prophetic mission public circa 617, often in connection to verse 26:214 of the Quran, "And warn your nearest relations." In one version of this hadith, Muhammad invites his close relatives to Islam after a meal and seeks their assistance and deputyship. Among them, his young cousin Ali is the only one who offers his help to Muhammad, who then announces him as his heir and successor. Among others, such reports are presented by the Shia-leaning historian Ibn Ishaq (d. 767) and the Sunni scholars al-Tabari (d. 923), Abu al-Fida (d. 1331), and Ibn Kathir (d. 1373).

=== Hadith of the twelve successors ===
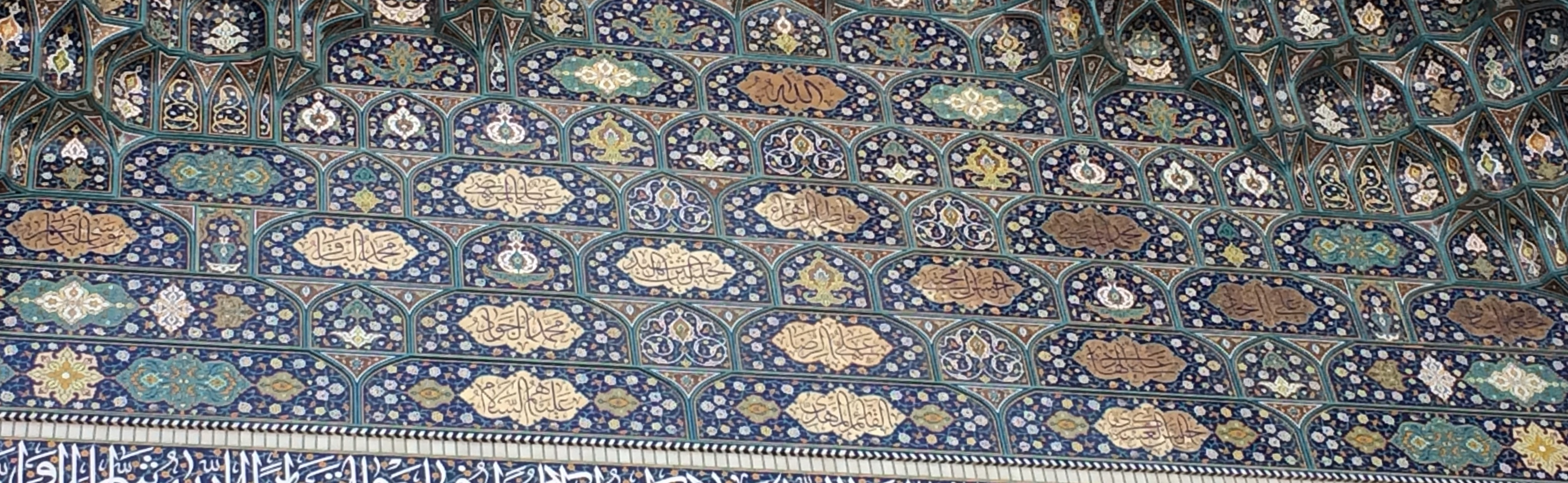
Names of Muhammad, his daughter Fatima, and the Twelve Imams, inscribed on the tilework of the shrine of Ali al-Rida, the eighth of the Twelve Imams, located in Mashhad, Iran

The hadith of the twelve successors is a widely-reported prophecy, attributed to Muhammad, predicting that there would be twelve successors after him. As there were many more rulers after Muhammad, Sunni authors have variously identified these twelve successors with some of these rulers. In Twelver Shia, these successors are instead identified with their Twelve Imams. Their last imam, Muhammad al-Mahdi, also known as al-Qa'im (lit. 'he who will rise'), is believed to miraculously remain in occultation since 874, and is expected to return in the end of times to eradicate injustice and evil. Indeed, some Shia versions of this hadith explicitly identify the first successor as Ali and the last successor as Muhammad al-Mahdi. One such version is related on the authority of Muhammad's cousin Ibn Abbas (d. c. 687), "I [Muhammad] am the master of the prophets and Ali is the master of my trustees, of whom there will be twelve; the first one is Ali, and the last is al-Qa'im."

=== Hadith of the ark ===
The hadith of the ark is attributed to Muhammad and likens his family, the Ahl al-Bayt, to Noah's ark. Reported by both Shia and Sunni authorities, the version presented in the Sunni collection al-Mustadrak reads, "Truly the people of my house (ahl bayti) in my community is like Noah's ark: Whoever takes refuge therein is saved and whoever opposes it is drowned." This hadith is of particular significance in Shia Islam, where the Ahl al-Bayt are viewed as the spiritual and political successors of Muhammad.

=== Hadith of the thaqalayn ===
The hadith of the thaqalayn (lit. 'two treasures') is a widely-reported prophetic statement that introduces the Quran and the progeny of Muhammad as the only two sources of divine guidance after his death. This hadith is central to Twelver Shia, where their line of Twelve Imams, starting with Ali, are viewed as the spiritual and political successors of Muhammad. The version that appears in Musnad Ahmad, a canonical Sunni source, reads,

I [Muhammad] left among you two treasures which, if you cling to them, you shall not be led into error after me. One of them is greater than the other: The book of God (Quran), which is a rope stretched from Heaven to Earth, and [the second one is] my progeny, my Ahl al-Bayt. These two shall not be parted until they return to the pool [of abundance in paradise, kawthar].

=== Hadith of the kisa ===
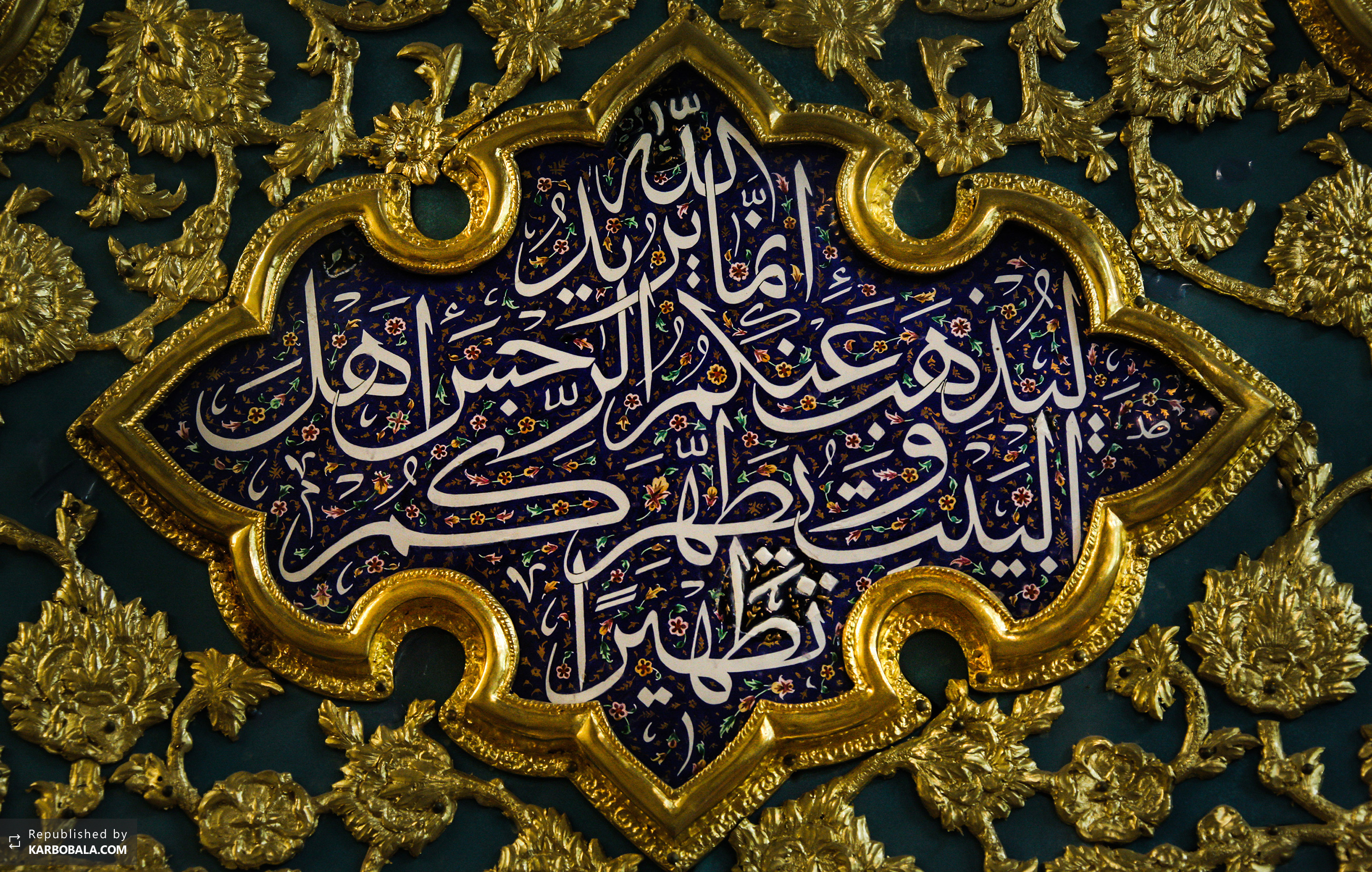
Verse of purification, inscribed in the shrine of Husayn, located in Karbala, Iraq

At least on one occasion, Muhammad is said to have gathered Ali, Fatima, Hasan, and Husayn under his cloak, and then prayed, "O God, these are my ahl al-bayt and my closest family members; remove defilement from them and purify them completely," where this last statement is a reference to verse 33:33 of the Quran, known also as the verse of purification. The verse contains the passage, "God only desires to remove defilement from you, O ahl al-bayt, and to purify you completely." These five have thus become known as the Ahl al-Kisa (lit. 'people of the cloak'). The verse of purification is thus regarded in Shia Islam as evidence of the infallibility of the Ahl al-Kisa. Variants of this tradition can be found in Sahih Muslim, Sunan al-Tirmidhi, and Musnad Ahmad, all canonical sources in Sunni Islam.

=== Others ===
There exist numerous other prophetic statements in favor of Ali in Sunni and Shia sources, more so than for any other companion, according to the Sunni scholar Ahmad ibn Hanbal (d. 855). Some of these sayings are listed below.

- Ali is from me and I am from him (Ali minni wa anna minhu), and he is the wali (lit. 'patron' or 'guardian') of every believer after me. (Khasa'is, al-Mustadrak, Sunan al-Tirmidhi)
- Ali is with the Quran and the Quran is with Ali. They will not separate until they return to me at the [paradisal] pool (al-hawd). (al-Mustadrak)
- The truth circulates with him (Ali) wherever he goes. (Sunan al-Tirmidhi, al-Mustadrak)
- I am the city of knowledge and Ali is its gate. (al-Mustadrak)
- Whoever obeys Ali obeys me, and whoever disobeys him disobeys me. (al-Mustadrak)
- No one but a believer loves Ali and no one but a hypocrite (munafiq) hates Ali. (Sunan Ibn Maja)
- There is no youth braver than Ali. (Sunan al-Tirmidhi)

== See also ==
- Muhammad in the Quran
- Ali in the Quran
- Fatima in the Quran and Hadith
- Hasan ibn Ali in the Quran and Hadith
- Husayn ibn Ali in the Quran and Hadith
