= Ali in the Quran =

Quran verses about Ali ibn Abi Talib

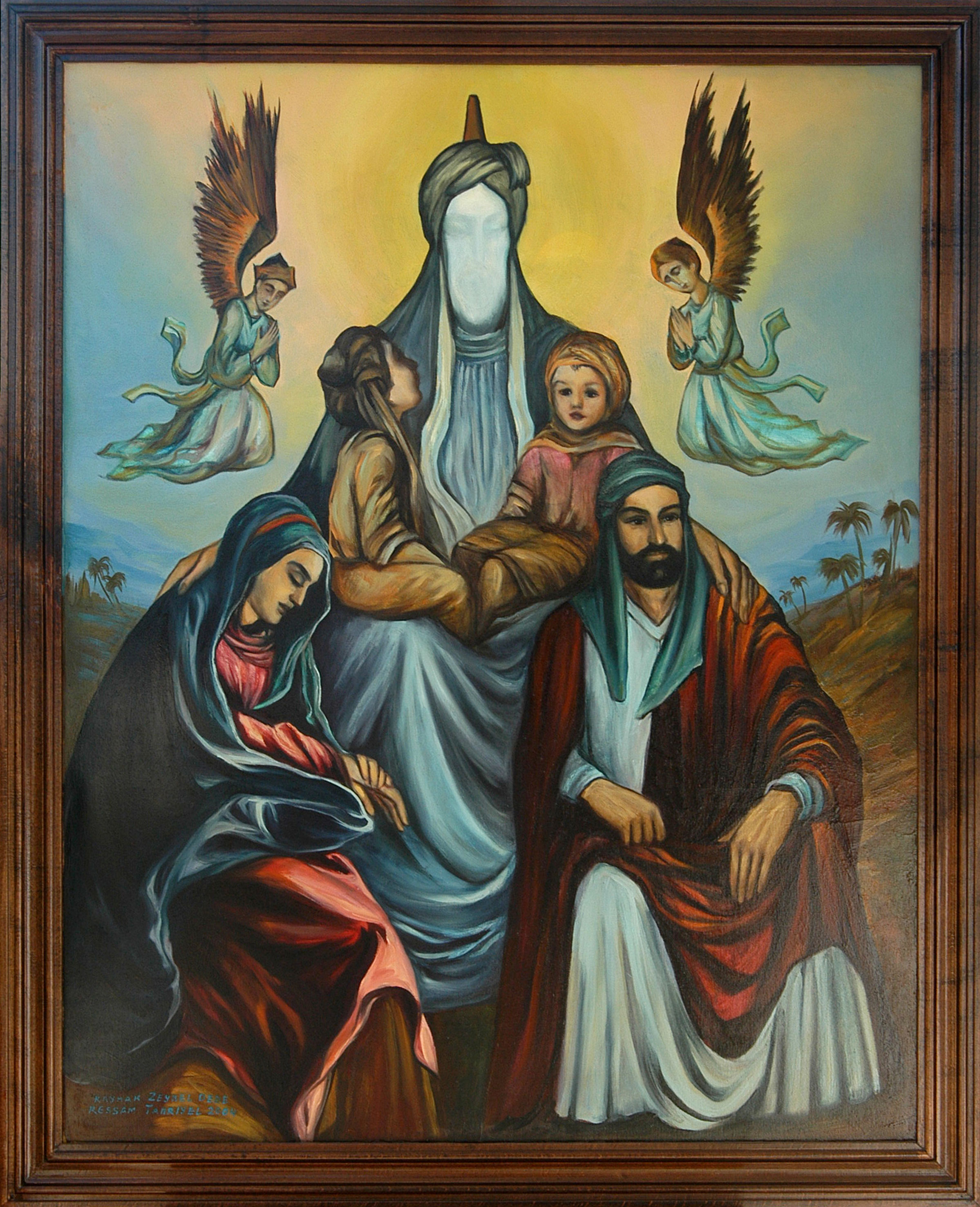
Depiction of Muhammad with Ali (his cousin and son-in-law), Fatima (his daughter) and his grandsons, Hasan and Husayn in Qajar Persia, mid-19th Century.

Ali in the Quran collects the verses of the Quran, the central religious text of Islam, which are said to have been revealed about Ali ibn Abi Talib, the cousin and son-in-law of the Islamic prophet Muhammad. Ali played a pivotal role during the formative years of Islam and is recognized as the fourth Rashidun caliph (r. 656–661) in Sunni Islam and the first imam in Shia Islam. Perhaps the most controversial such verse is 5:55, also known as the verse of walaya, which gave Ali the same spiritual authority (walaya) as Muhammad, according to the Shia.

== Verses linked to Ali ==
Ali regularly represented Muhammad in missions that were preceded or followed by Quranic injunctions. Nevertheless, the mainstream view in Islam is that he is not mentioned by name in the Quran, although some have interpreted certain occurrences of the words aliyyan, aliyyun, alayya in the Quran in reference to Ali. One such instance is verse 19:50, which some have interpreted as, "We appointed for them Ali as a voice of truth." Independent of such views, Shia tradition connects Ali and other Shia imams with many ambiguous (mutashabih) verses of the Quran, cf. verse 3:7. For instance, a tradition ascribed to Ali suggests that a fourth of the Quran is about the House of Muhammad, or the Ahl al-Bayt, while another fourth is about their enemies. The extant Quran certainly does not meet this description but the inconsistency can be explained by another Shia tradition, which states that the verses of the Quran about the virtuous are primarily directed at the Ahl al-Bayt, while those verses about the evildoers are directed first at their enemies. Beyond these, certain verses of the Quran were directly revealed about Ali, according to some Shia and Sunni authorities, a few of which are listed below.

=== Verse 2:207 ===
Laylat al-mabit (lit. 'the overnight stay') refers to the night in 622 CE in which Muhammad migrated from the city of Mecca to Yathrib, later renamed Medina, apparently to foil an assassination plan. That night, Ali reputedly risked his life by sleeping in Muhammad's bed instead of him to facilitate his escape. When the assassins broke into Muhammad's residence, they found Ali, whose life they spared. His act of self-sacrifice may have been the reason for the revelation of verse 2:207 in the Quran, "But there is also a kind of man who gives his life away to please God, and God is most compassionate to his servants." This was the opinion Ibn Abbas (d. 687), an influential early exegete, and such reports are also found in the works of the Sunni authors al-Tha'labi (d. 1035-6), al-Razi (d. 1209), and al-Haskani, the Shia authors al-Tabarsi (d. 1153), al-Hilli (d. 1325), al-Balaghi (d. 1933), and the Mu'tazilite scholar Ibn Abi'l-Hadid (d. 1258).

=== Verse 3:61 ===
A Christian envoy from Najran, located in South Arabia, arrived in Medina circa 632 and negotiated a peace treaty with Muhammad. During their stay, the two parties may have also debated the nature of Jesus, human or divine, although the delegation ultimately rejected the Islamic belief, which acknowledges the miraculous birth of Jesus but rejects the Christians' belief in his divinity. Linked to this ordeal is verse 3:61 of the Qur'an. This verse instructs Muhammad to challenge his opponents to mubahala (lit. 'mutual cursing'), perhaps when the debate had reached a deadlock.

فَمَنْ حَآجَّكَ فِيهِ مِنۢ بَعْدِ مَا جَآءَكَ مِنَ ٱلْعِلْمِ فَقُلْ تَعَالَوْا۟ نَدْعُ أَبْنَآءَنَا وَأَبْنَآءَكُمْ وَنِسَآءَنَا وَنِسَآءَكُمْ وَأَنفُسَنَا وَأَنفُسَكُمْ ثُمَّ نَبْتَهِلْ فَنَجْعَل لَّعْنَتَ ٱللَّهِ عَلَى ٱلْكَـٰذِبِينَ
And to whomsoever disputes with thee over it, after the knowledge that has come unto thee, say, "Come! Let us call upon our sons and your sons, our women and your women, ourselves and yourselves. Then let us pray earnestly, so as to place the curse of God upon those who lie."

The delegation withdrew from the challenge and negotiated for peace. The majority of reports indicate that Muhammad appeared for the occasion of mubahala, accompanied by his daughter Fatima, her husband 'Ali, and their two sons, Al-Hasan and Al-Husayn. Such reports are given by the Shi'a-leaning historian Ibn Ishaq (d. 767), and the Sunni scholars al-Razi, Muslim ibn al-Hajjaj (d. 875), Hakim al-Nishapuri (d. 1014), and Ibn Kathir (d. 1373). The inclusion of these four by Muhammad in the mubahala ritual, as his witnesses and guarantors, must have raised their religious rank within the community. If the word 'ourselves' (Arabic: أَنفُسَنَا, romanized: anfusana) in the verse is a reference to 'Ali and Muhammad, as Shi'a authors argue, then the former naturally enjoys a similar religious authority in the Qur'an as the latter.

=== Verse 5:3 ===
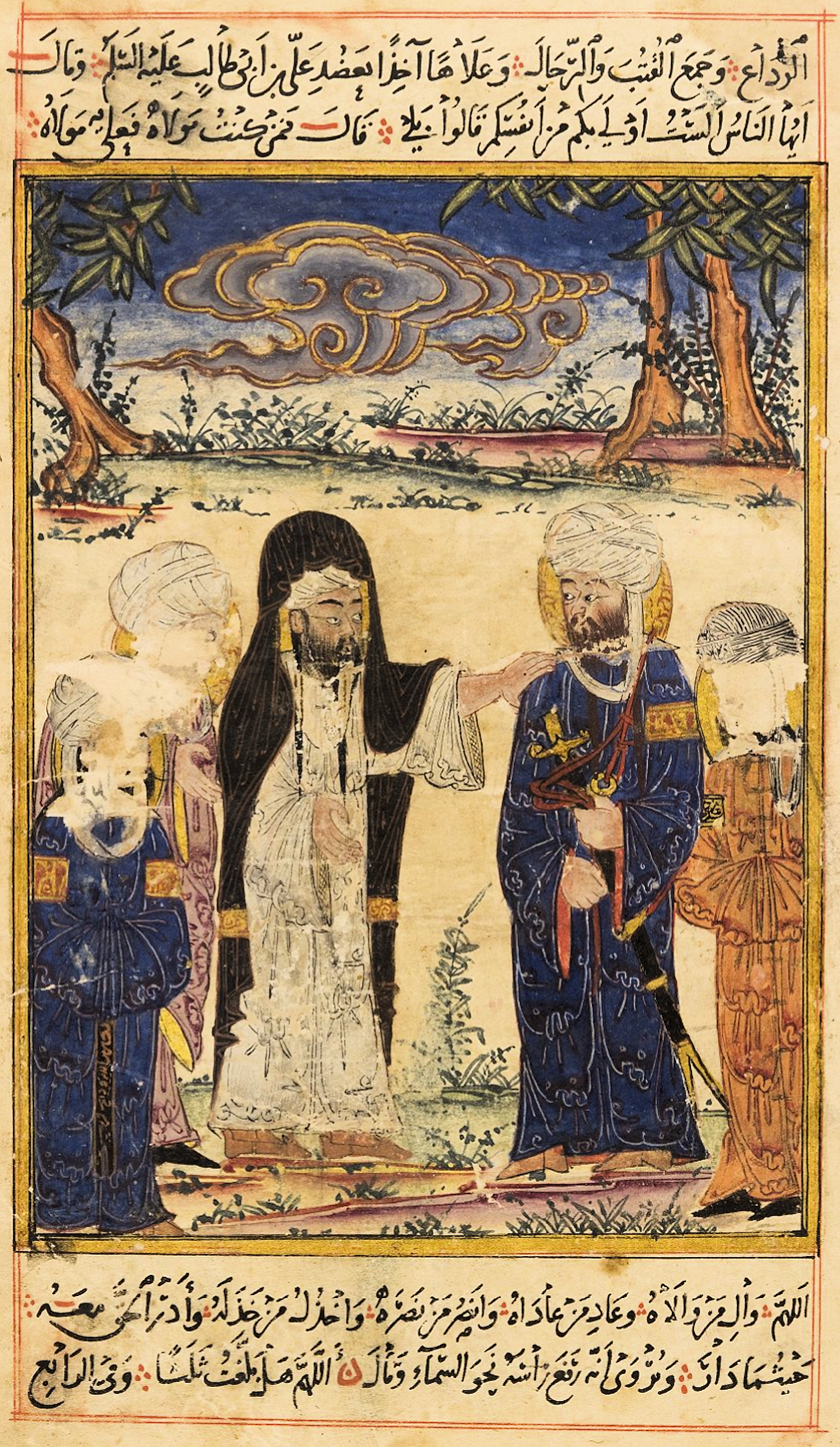
The Investiture of Ali at Ghadir Khumm in a fourteenth-century Ilkhanid copy of Chronology of Ancient Nations, illustrated by Ibn al-Kutbi

Also known as the verse of ikmal al-din, verse 5:3 of the Quran includes the passage, "This day those who disbelieve have despaired of your religion. So fear them not, but fear Me! This day I have perfected for you your religion, and completed My blessing upon you, and have approved for you as religion, submission [to God] (islam)." The chief Sunni interpretation of this verse is that it was revealed to Muhammad during his Farewell Pilgrimage to Mecca to signal the completion of Islamic legislation, although some legal injunctions about riba were probably revealed after this verse. By contrast, Shia authorities are nearly unanimous that the verse of ikmal was revealed following the announcement of Muhammad at the Ghadir Khumm, after his Farewell Pilgrimage and shortly before his death in 632. In Shia sources, Muhammad received this revelation following his designation of Ali at the Ghadir Khumm to guide the nascent Muslim community after him. Some Sunni sources also associate the verse of ikmal with the Ghadir Khumm but reject its Shia significance.

=== Verse 5:55 ===
Known in Shia Islam as the verse of walaya (or wilaya), verse 5:55 of the Quran is translated by The Study Quran as, "Your protector (wali) is only (innama) God, and His Messenger, and those who believe, who perform the prayer and give alms (zakat) while (waw) bowing down." This matches the Shia translation, while the Sunni translation of the verse is, "Your (real) friends are (no less than) God, His Messenger, and the believers—those who establish prayers and pay zakat and (waw) they bow down humbly (in worship)." Responsible for their difference is the Arabic conjunction waw, which can mean 'while', as in the Shia translation, or may mean 'and', as in the Sunni translation. As for the occasion of its revelation, the verse is considered a specific reference to Ali by Shia and some Sunni commentators, that is, a reference to when Ali reputedly gave his ring to a beggar while he was bowing in worship in the mosque. The frequent association of this verse with Ali in early Sunni sources may support the authenticity of this claim.

=== Verse 5:67 ===
Also known as the verse of tabligh (lit. 'proclamation'), verse of 5:67 of the Quran reads,

O Messenger! Convey that which has been sent down unto thee from thy Lord, and if thou dost not, thou wilt not have conveyed His message. And God will protect thee from mankind. Surely God guides not disbelieving people.

In Shia Islam, this verse spurred Muhammad to deliver his announcement at the Ghadir Khumm about Ali, which in Shia signifies the divine investiture of Ali with the spiritual authority (walaya) over Muslims. A few Sunni authors have similarly linked this verse to Ali's merits. Other Sunni exegetes forward different views, one of which connects this verse to Muhammad's criticism of Jews and Christians.

=== Verse 33:33 ===
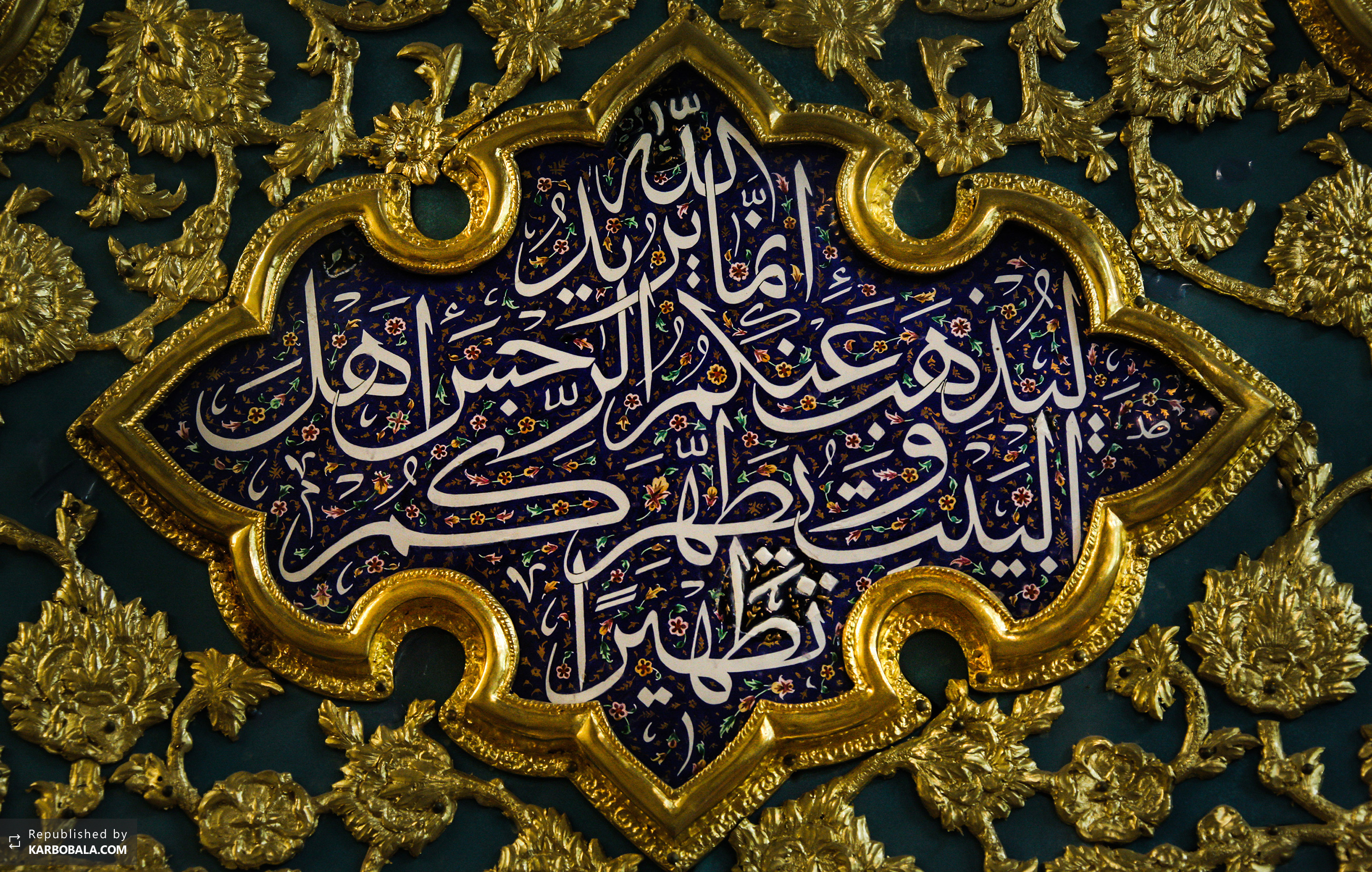
Verse of purification, inscribed in the shrine of Husayn in Karbala, Iraq

Known as the verse of purification, verse 33:33 of the Quran concerns the status of purity of the Ahl al-Bayt, the last passage of which reads, "God only desires (innama yuridu llahu) to remove defilement (rijs) from you, O Ahl al-Bayt, and to purify you completely." Pointing to authentic traditions in Sunni and Shia sources, Shia Islam limits the Ahl al-Bayt to Muhammad, Ali, Fatima, and their two sons, Hasan and Husayn. There are various views in Sunni Islam, though a typical compromise is to include also Muhammad's wives in the Ahl al-Bayt, perhaps because the earlier injunctions in the verse of purification are addressed at Muhammad's wives. The verse of purification is regarded by the Shia as evidence of the infallibility of the Ahl al-Bayt.

=== Verse 42:23 ===
Known as the verse of mawadda (lit. 'affection' or 'love'), verse 42:23 of the Quran includes the passage, "[O Mohammad!] Say, 'I ask not of you any reward for it, save affection among kinsfolk.'" The Shia-leaning Ibn Ishaq narrates that Muhammad specified al-qurba in this verse as Ali, Fatima, and their two sons, Hasan and Husayn. This is also the view of some Sunni scholars, including al-Razi (d. 1209), Baydawi (d. 1319), and Ibn al-Maghazili. Most Sunni authors, however, reject the Shia view and offer various alternatives, chief among them is that this verse enjoins love for kinsfolk in general. In Twelver Shia, the love in the verse of mawadda also entails obedience to the Ahl al-Bayt as the source of exoteric and esoteric religious guidance.

=== Verses 76:5–22 ===
Verses 76:5-22 are connected to Ali in most Shia and some Sunni sources, including the works of the Shia al-Tabarsi, and the Sunni scholars al-Qurtubi (d. 1273) and al-Alusi (d. 1854). According to these authors, verses 76:5–22 were revealed to Muhammad after Ali, Fatima, Hasan, Husayn, and their maidservant Fidda gave away their only meal of the day to beggars who visited their home, for three consecutive days. In particular, verses 76:7–12 read,

They fulfill their vows and fear a day whose evil is widespread, and give food, despite loving it, to the indigent, the orphan, and the captive. "We feed you only for the Face of God. We do not desire any recompense or thanks from you. Truly we fear from our Lord a grim, calamitous day." So God has shielded them from the evil of that Day, bestowed upon them radiance and joy, and rewarded them for having been patient with a Garden and with silk.

== See also ==
- Muhammad in the Quran
- Ali in the Hadith
- Fatima in the Quran and Hadith
- Hasan ibn Ali in the Quran and Hadith
- Husayn ibn Ali in the Quran and Hadith
