= Mohammad Hossein Tabatabai =

Mohammad Hossein Tabatabai (محمد حسین طباطبائی) (born 1991) is notable for being able to recite the entire Quran and interpret its meaning at age seven. At that age, he planned to become a religious leader. At the age of 2 he could recite the 30th Juz' of Quran by heart and memorized all the Quran at the age 5. He is now studying in Qom, Iran specialising in Mantiq and studying books that are described to be extremely difficult and usually studied by learned people.
