= Ash-Shura =

42nd chapter of the Qur'an

Surah 42 of the Quran
الشورى Ash-Shūrā Council
- Qira'ah; English text
- Classification: Meccan
- Position: Juzʼ 25
- No. of verses: 53
- No. of Rukus: 5
- No. of words: 983
- No. of letters: 3473

Ash-Shūrā (Arabic: الشورى, aš-šūrā, "Council, Consultation") is the 42nd chapter (sūrah) of the Qur'an (Q42) with 53 verses (āyāt). Its title derives from the question of "shūrā" (consultation) referred to in Verse 38. The term appears only once in the Quranic text (at Q42:38) and has no pre-Quranic antecedent.

Regarding the timing and contextual background of the revelation (asbāb al-nuzūl), it is traditionally believed to be a Meccan surah, from the second Meccan period (615-619).

== Summary ==
- 1-3 The Almighty reveals his will to Muhammad
- 4 Angels intercede with God on behalf of sinful man
- 5 Muhammad not a steward over the idolaters
- 6 The Quran revealed in the Arabic language to warn Makkah
- 7-10 God the only helper, creator, and preserver, the all-knowing
- 11-13 Islam the religion of all the former prophets
- 14 Muhammad commanded to declare his faith in the Bible and Torah
- 15 Disputers with God shall be severely punished
- 16-17 God only knows the hour of the judgment
- 18-19 The Almighty will reward the righteous and the wicked according to their deeds
- 20 Sinners only spared through God's forbearance
- 21-22 Rewards of the just and of the unjust
- 23 Muhammad charged with imposture
- 24-27 The sovereign God forgives and blesses whom he will
- 28-33 God's power manifested in his works
- 34-41 A true believer's character decided
- 42-45 The miserable fate of those whom God causes to err
- 46 Sinners exhorted to repent before it is too late
- 47-48 Muhammad only a preacher
- 49 God controls all things
- 50-51 Why God reveals himself by inspiration and through apostles
- 52-53 Prophet Muhammad did not know of ˹this˺ Book and faith ˹before˺.

== Q42:51 Revelation in Islam ==
In Islamic tradition, Quran 42:51 serves as the basis of understanding for Revelation in Islam (waḥy).

وَمَا كَانَ لِبَشَرٍ أَن يُكَلِّمَهُ ٱللَّهُ إِلَّا وَحْيًا أَوْ مِن وَرَآئِ حِجَابٍ أَوْ يُرْسِلَ رَسُولًۭا فَيُوحِىَ بِإِذْنِهِۦ مَا يَشَآءُ ۚ إِنَّهُۥ عَلِىٌّ حَكِيمٌۭ
"It is not fitting for a man that Allah should speak to him except by inspiration, or from behind a veil, or by the sending of a messenger to reveal, with Allah's permission, what Allah wills".

Based on this verse, Islamic scholars have described three ways in which God's revelation can reach His chosen individuals, especially prophets.

- An inspired message – not a word but an idea – can enter the heart of the chosen individuals either in the state of consciousness or in dream.
- The second mode, it is said, is the word heard by the person spoken to, as from behind a veil.
- In the third mode, the revelation is sent from God through archangels like Gabriel and is delivered to the prophets. It is the highest form of revelation, and Muslims believe the whole Quran was revealed in this mode.
