= Shia Islamic beliefs and practices =

Beliefs and practices of Twelver Shia Islam

The beliefs and practices of Twelver Shia Islam are categorised into:

- Theology or Roots of the Religion - five beliefs
- Ancillaries of the Faith or Branches of the Religion - ten practices

== Theological principles ==
- Tawhid - the Oneness of God
- Adl "divine justice"
- Nubuwwah "prophethood"
- Imamate "leadership of Mankind"
- Resurrection of the dead

== The Ancillaries of the Faith ==
- Salat "ritual prayer"
- Sawm "Fasting" during the month of Ramadan
- Hajj "pilgrimage" to Mecca
- Zakāt - charitable giving
- Khums - a "Fifth" of specific kinds of income given to charity
- Jihad "struggle"
- Commanding right and forbidding wrong
- Forbidding what is evil
- Tawalla - love of faith and the chosen of God
- Tabarra - disassociation from enemies of the faith and God's chosen.

== See also ==
- Principles of Shia Islam jurisprudence
