= Arkan (disambiguation) =

Arkan is the pseudonym of Željko Ražnatović (1952–2000), Serbian mobster and paramilitary commander.

Arkan may also refer to:

- Arkan (dance), dance of the Hutsul people in Ukraine
- Arkan a track on the Respublika (Ukrainians album)
- Arkan, Iran (disambiguation), several places in Iran
- Arkan al-Islam (Five Pillars of Islam)
- 9M117M1 Arkan, a variant of 9M117 Bastion Russian anti-tank missile
- Arka'n Asrafokor, a Togolese band previously known simply as Arka'n

== People with the name ==
- Seyfi Arkan (1903–1966), Turkish architect
- Arkan Simaan (born 1945), Lebanese-born French novelist and historian of science
- Arkan Mubayed (born 1983), Syrian footballer

== See also ==
- Arcan (disambiguation)
