= Arcan =

Arcan may refer to:

- Arcan (dance), Romanian dance (Ukrainian version: Arkan)
- Arcan (surname)
- Arcan Cetin (1996–2017), American mass murderer
- Arçan, Azerbaijan

== See also ==
- Arkan (disambiguation)
- Arcane (disambiguation)
