= Aqidah =

Islamic term for denominational practice or theology

Aqidah (Arabic: عَقِيدَة, romanized: ʿaqīdah, IPA: [ʕɑˈqiːdæ], pl. عَقَائِد, ʿaqāʾid, [ʕɑˈqɑːʔɪd]) is an Islamic term of Arabic origin that means "creed". It is also called Islamic creed or Islamic theology.

Aqidah goes beyond concise statements of faith and may not be part of an ordinary Muslim's religious instruction. It has been distinguished from iman in "taking the aspects of Iman and extending it to a detail level" often using "human interpretation or sources". Also, in contrast with iman, the word aqidah is not explicitly mentioned in the Quran.

Many schools of Islamic theology expressing different aqidah exist. However, this term has taken a significant technical usage in the Islamic theology, and is a branch of Islamic studies describing the beliefs of Islam.

== Etymology ==
Aqidah comes from the Semitic root ʿ-q-d, which means "to tie; knot". ("Aqidah" used not only as an expression of a school of Islamic theology or belief system, but as another word for "theology" in Islam, as in: "Theology (Aqidah) covers all beliefs and belief systems of Muslims, including sectarian differences and points of contention".)

== Introduction ==
According to Muslim scholar Cyril Glasse, "systematic statements of belief became necessary, from early [on in the history of] Islam, initially to refute heresies, and later to distinguish points of view and to present them, as the divergences of schools of theology or opinion increased."

The "first" creed written as "a short answer to the pressing heresies of the time" is known as Fiqh Akbar and ascribed to Abu Hanifa. Two creeds were the Fiqh Akbar II "representative" of the Ash'ari, and Fiqh Akbar III, "representative" of the Shafi'i. Al-Ghazali also had an aqidah.

According to Malcolm Clark, while Islam "is not a creedal religion", it has produced some detailed creeds, "some containing 100 or more belief statements" that summarized "the theological position of a particular scholar or school."

=== Six articles of belief ===
The six articles of faith or belief (Arkan al-Iman) derived from the Quran and Sunnah, are accepted by all Muslims. While there are differences between Shia and Sunni Islam and other schools or sects concerning issues such as the attributes of God and the purpose of angels, the six articles are not disputed.

The six Sunni articles of belief are:

1. Belief in God and tawhid
2. Belief in the angels
3. Belief in the Islamic holy books
4. Belief in the prophets and messengers
5. Belief in the Last Judgment and Resurrection
6. Belief in predestination

The first five are based on several Qurʾanic beliefs:

...righteous is he who believeth in God and the Last Day and the angels and the scripture and the prophets (2:177)
...believer believes in God and His angels and His scriptures and His messengers (2:285)
Whoever disbelieveth in God and His angels and His scriptures and His messengers and the Last Day, he verily wandered far stray (4:136)
Who is an enemy of God, His Angels, His Messengers, Gabriel and Michael! Then, lo! God is an enemy to the disbelievers (2:98)

In Sunni and Shia views, having Iman literally means believing in the six articles.

=== Tawhid ===
Tawhid ("doctrine of Oneness") is the religion's most fundamental concept and holds that Allah (the Arabic word for God) is one (aḥad), unique (wāḥid), and the only being worthy of worship. The Quran teaches the existence of a single, absolute truth that transcends the world—a unique, independent, and indivisible being, independent of the entire creation. God, according to Islam, is a universal God, rather than a local, tribal, or parochial one, and is an absolute who integrates all affirmative values.

=== Iman ===
Iman, in Islamic theology, denotes a believer's faith in the metaphysical aspects of Islam. Its most simple definition is the belief in the six articles of faith, known as arkān al-īmān.

== Hadith of Gabriel ==
The Hadith of Gabriel includes the Five Pillars of Islam (Tawhid, Salat, Sawm, Zakat, Hajj) in answer to the question, "O messenger of God, what is Islam?" This hadith is sometimes called the "truly first and most fundamental creed."

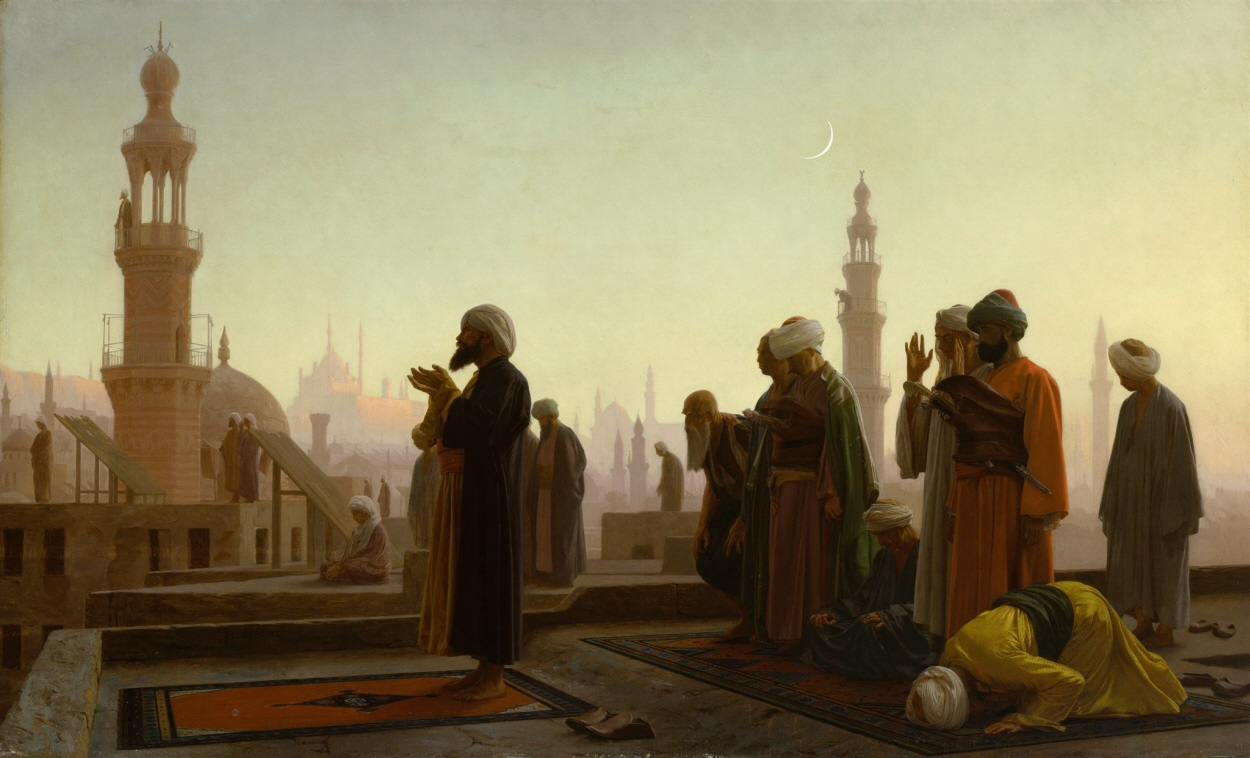
An Imam leading prayers in Cairo, Egypt, in 1865

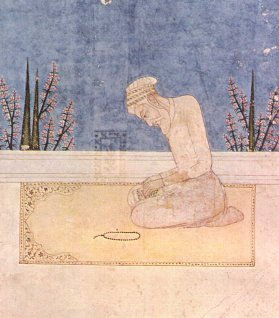
The Mughal emperor Aurangzeb performing Salat

=== Salat ===
Salat is an act of worship. Salat means to call to the Lord Who created and gives life to the worshipper in Islam. This call realizes one to surrender caller's will, obeying his God. It is one of the Five Pillars of Islam. Islam gives concession conditionally if it is difficult to pray Salat in formal ways. People who find it physically difficult can perform Salat in a way suitable to them. To perform valid Salat, Muslims must be in a state of ritual purity, which is mainly achieved by ritual wash ups, (wuḍūʾ), as per prescribed procedures. Salat consists of "standing" (Qiyam) intending to call God, bow at knees (Ruku) meaning to ready to obey, prostrate (Sajda) willing to surrender worshipper's will to God's, then to sit (Tashhud) asserting evidence of the oneness of God and the finality of God's apostle (Nabi).

=== Sawm ===
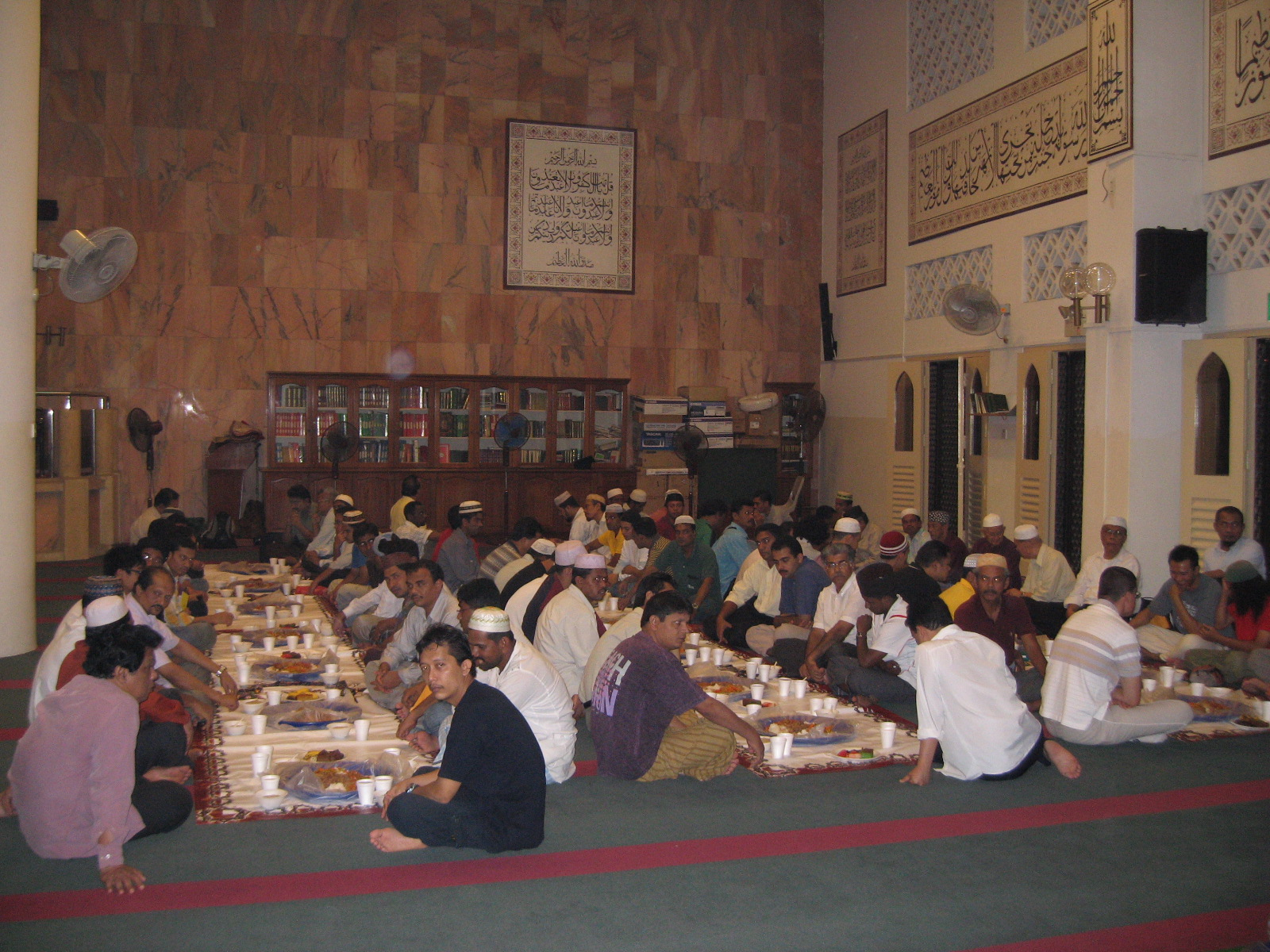
Ending the fast at a mosque

In the terminology of Islamic law, sawm means to abstain from eating, drinking (including water) and sexual intercourse from dawn until dusk. The observance of sawm during the holy month of Ramadan is one of the Five Pillars of Islam, but is not confined to that month.

=== Zakat ===
Zakat is the practice of charitable giving by Muslims based on accumulated wealth and is obligatory for all who are able to do so. It is considered to be a personal responsibility for Muslims to ease economic hardship for others and eliminate inequality.

=== Hajj ===
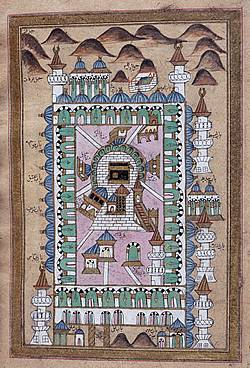
A 16th century illustration of Islam's holiest shrine, the Ka'aba

The Hajj is an Islamic pilgrimage to Mecca and the largest gathering of Muslims in the world every year. It is one of the five pillars of Islam, and a religious duty which must be carried out by every able-bodied Muslim who can afford to do so at least once in his or her lifetime.

== Other tenets ==
In addition, some Muslims include Jihad and Dawah as part of aqidah.

=== Jihad ===
Jihad (to struggle) and literally means to endeavor, strive, labor to apply oneself, to concentrate, to work hard, to accomplish. It could be used to refer to those who physically, mentally or militarily serve in the way of God. In the religious context, it is the struggle against disbelief and non-muslim life to establish, propagate and spread the faith and its principles on individualistic and societal levels.

=== Dawah ===
Da‘wah ("invitation") means the preaching of Islam. Da‘wah literally means "issuing a summon" or "making an invitation", being an active participle of a verb meaning variously "to summon" or "to invite." A Muslim who practices da‘wah, either as a religious worker or in a volunteer community effort, is called a dā‘ī (داعي plural du‘āh, gen: du‘āt دعاة).

A dā‘ī is thus a person who invites people to understand Islam through dialogue, not unlike the Islamic equivalent of a missionary inviting people to the faith, prayer and manner of Islamic life.

== Eschatology ==
Eschatology is literally understood as the last things or ultimate things and in Muslim theology, eschatology refers to the end of this world and what will happen in the next world or hereafter. Eschatology covers the death of human beings, their souls after their bodily death, the total destruction of this world, the resurrection of humans, the Last Judgment of human deeds by God after the resurrection, and the rewards and punishments for the believers and non-believers respectively. The places for the believers in the hereafter are known as Paradise and for the non-believers as Hell.

== Schools of theology ==
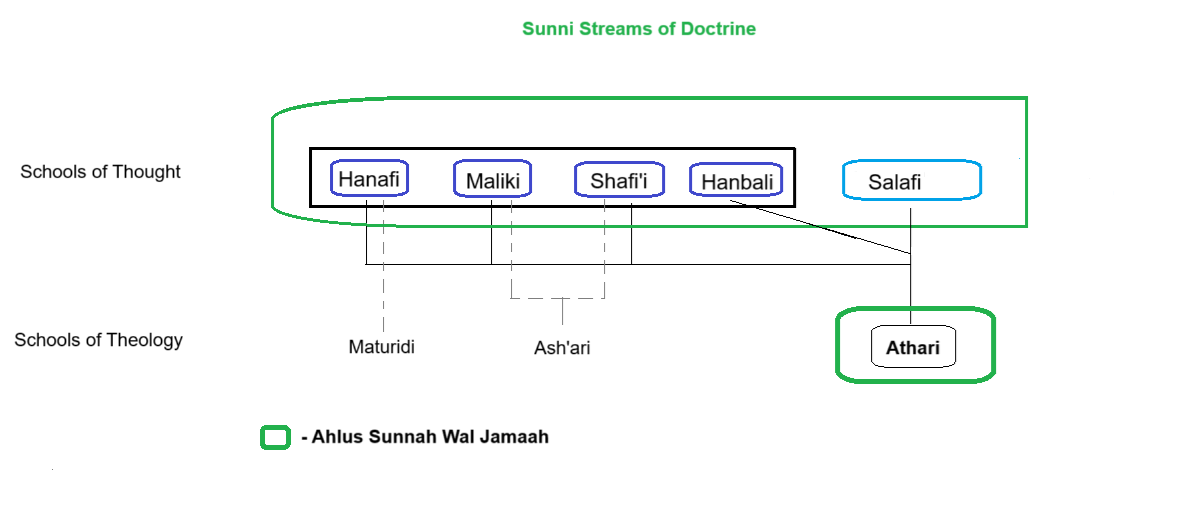
Main schools of thought within Sunni Islam, and other prominent streams.

The contents of Muslim theology can be divided into theology proper such as theodicy, eschatology, anthropology, apophatic theology, and comparative religion. In the history of Sunni Muslim theology, there have been theological schools among Muslims displaying both similarities and differences with each other in regard to beliefs.

=== Kalam ===
Kalām is an "Islamic scholastic theology" of seeking theological principles through dialectic. In Arabic, the word literally means "speech/words." A scholar of kalām is referred to as a mutakallim (Muslim theologian; plural mutakallimūn). There are many schools of Kalam, the main ones being the Ash'ari and Maturidi schools in Sunni Islam, and the Mu'tazilis (who are not Sunni). Traditionalist theology rejects the use of kalam, regarding human reason as sinful in unseen matters.

=== Usul al-din ===
Usul al-din, "the principles of religion", is used by scholars in different meanings. In the ordinary sense, it represents the aqidah, articles of faith, "truths which must be believed". In this sense, the scientific discussion about usul al-din constitute the ilm al-kalam.

There is a difference in the use of the word usul in usul al-din when compared with usul al-fiqh where the term refers to the sources underlying the sharia, as usul al-din represents not the sources, but the theological judgement itself.

Usul al-din is frequently used in titles of many works by Islamic scholars, including the kalam ones.

Western scholars, like George Makdisi, occasionally use usul al-din to designate the traditionalist theology as opposed to the rationalist kalam.

Usul al-din can also designate a theological discipline ("principles of religion") that is studied at the Islamic universities. For example, from 1950, the al-Azhar University included three faculties: Islamic law (al-sharia), usul al-din, and Arabic language.

=== Mu'tazilis ===
In terms of the relationship between human beings and their creator, the Muʿtazila emphasize human free will over predestination. They also reduced the divine attributes to the divine essence. The Mu'tazilites are considered heretics by all the traditional Sunni Islamic schools of theology.

=== Sunni schools ===
Sunni Muslim theology is the theology and interpretation of creed (aqidah) that derived from the Qur'an and Hadith.

==== Ash'aris ====
The eponymous founder of this school is Abu al-Hasan al-Ash'ari, one of the first to study under but then quit the Mu'tazilis. He then towards the end of his life became an Ashari. It was the historic foe of the Mu'tazili school, the "rationalists" in terms of speculative theology.

Ash'arism accepts reason as a witness to the evidence in the scripture. What God does or commands—as revealed in the Quran and ahadith—is by definition just. What He prohibits is by definition unjust. Right and wrong are objective realities. The Quran is the uncreated word of God in essence, however, it is created when it takes on a form in letters or sound.

Some scholars, especially those of the Hanbali school, such as Ibn Qudamah spoke harshly against the Ash'aris, saying "It is obligatory to abandon the people of innovation and misguidance.", going on to list deviant groups, in which he mentioned the Asha'ris. Other scholars outside of the Hanbali madhhab such as Shafi’i, Maliki, and Hanafi scholars, and some of the later Hanbali scholars accepted them into Ahlus Sunnah Wal Jamaah and did not view them as deviants.

==== Maturidis ====
Maturidism is a Sunni theological school founded by Abu Mansur al-Maturidi, holding many positions in common with the Ash'aris but differing from them on others. Much like the Ash'arite approach to Qur'anic verses that could yield an anthropomorphic concept of God, they affirmed His transcendence while understanding these expressions by the conventional figurative meanings they had garnered in Arabic.

Maturidism holds, that humans are creatures endowed with reason, that differentiates them from animals. Further, the relationship between people and God differs from that of nature and God; humans are endowed with free will, but due to God's sovereignty, God creates the acts the humans choose, so humans can perform them. Ethics can be understood just by reason and do not need prophetic guidances. Maturidi also considered hadiths as unreliable, when they are in odd with reason. However, the human mind alone could not grasp the entire truth, thus it is in need of revelation in regard of mysterious affairs. Further, Maturidism opposes anthropomorphism and similitude, while simultaneously does not deny the divine attributes. They must be either interpreted in the light of Tawhid or be left out.

==== Athari theology ====
For the Athari theology, the apparent meaning of the Qur'an and especially the prophetic traditions have ultimate precedence in matters of belief, as well as law, and to engage in rational disputation, without textual evidence, is absolutely forbidden. Atharis engage in an amodal reading of the Qur'an, as opposed to one engaged in Ta'wil (metaphorical interpretation). They do not attempt to rationally conceptualize the meanings of the Qur'an and believe that the real meanings should be consigned to God alone (tafwid). This theology was taken from exegesis of the Qur'an and statements of the early Muslims and later codified by a number of scholars including Ahmad ibn Hanbal and Ibn Qudamah.

=== Shia beliefs and practices ===
Shiʿi Muslims are different as they hold that there are five articles of belief. Similar to the Sunnis, the Shiʿis do not believe in complete predestination, or complete free will. They believe that in human life there is both free will and predestination.

==== Twelver's Roots of Shia Religion (Uṣūl ad-Dīn) ====
1. Tawhid: The Oneness of God.
2. Adalah: The Justice of God.
3. Nubuwwah (Prophethood): God has appointed perfect and infallible prophets and messengers to teach mankind the religion (i.e. a perfect system on how to live in "peace.")
4. Imamate: (Leadership): God has appointed specific leaders to lead and guide mankind— a prophet appoints a custodian of the religion before his demise.
5. Last Judgment: God will raise mankind for Judgment

==== Ismaili Shia beliefs ====
The branch of Islam known as Isma'ilism is the second largest Shiʿi community. They observe the following extra pillars:

1. Belief in the Imamate
2. Belief in the prophets and messengers
3. Beliefs about the Last Judgment

== Literature pertaining to creed ==
Many Muslim scholars have written Islamic creeds, or specific aspects of a aqidah. The following list contains some of the most well-known creeds.

=== Sunni literature ===
- Mukhtasar Shu'ab al-Imān or "The 77 branches of faith" by the Imām al-Bayhaqi
- Al-Fiqh Al-Akbar by Imām Abu Hanifa
- Al-Risala by Al-Shafi'i
- al-ʿAqīdah aṭ-Ṭaḥāwiyya ("The Fundamentals of Islamic Creed by al-Tahawi). This has been accepted by almost all Sunnis (Atharis, Ash'aris and Maturidis). Several Islamic scholars have written about the Tahawiyya creed, including Ali al-Qari, al-Maydani, ibn Abi al-Izz and Abd al-Aziz ibn Baz.
- Usool as- Sunnah by Imām Ahmad ibn Hanbal
- Al-Rad 'ala I- Zanadiqa wal-Jahmiya by Imām Ahmed ibn Hanbal
- Al- Iman by al-Adni
- As-Sunnah by Imām Abu Dawood
- Sarihus Sunnah by Imām Al-Tabari
- As-Sunnah by Imām Al-Tabarani
- Aqīdah Salafi Ahl al-Hadith by al-Sabuni
- Sharh Usool I'tīqaad Ahlus-Sunnah wal Jāmaa'ah by Imām Hibatullah-al- Laalakaa'ee
- As- Sunnah by Nasr al- Marwazi
- Ash-Shariah by al-Ajurri
- Al-Iman by Ibn Mandah
- Ad- Durrātu fīma yazibu i'tiqaduhu by Imām Ibn Hazm
- Kitāb at- Tāwhid Or Kalimah Al-Ikhlas(La Ilaha Illa Allah ) by Imām Ibn Rajab
- Al- 'Aqīdah al-Nasafiyya by Imām Najm al-Din 'Umar al-Nasafi
- Ar-rīsālah al-kairoāniyah by Abi Zaid al-Kairoa
- Al-I'tīqad by Al-Bayhaqi
- Al-ʿAqīdah al-Wāsiṭiyyah ("The Wasit Creed") by ibn Taymiyyah.
- Sharh as Sunnah or the Explanation of the Sunna by al-Hasan ibn 'Ali al-Barbahari. Lists approximately 170 points pertaining to the fundamentals of aqidah.
- Khalq Afʿāl al-ʿIbād ("The Creation of the Acts of Servants") by Muhammad al-Bukhari. It shows the opinion of early scholars (Salaf) but it does not cover all topics.
- Lum'at al-Itiqād by ibn Qudamah. Details the creed of the early Imams of the Sunni Muslims and one of the key works in the Athari creed.
- al-ʿUluww by al-Dhahabī. Details the opinions of early scholars on matters of creed.
- Ibaanah ān ūsulid diyanah by Abu al-Hasan al-Ash'ari.
- Risālah al-Qudsiyyah ("The Jerusalem Tract") by al-Ghazali, where the rules of faith are discussed.
- The Book of Tawhid: The Right of Allah Upon His Servants by Muhammad ibn Abd al-Wahhab.
- Sa'd al-Din al-Taftazani on the creed of Abu Hafs Umar an-Nasafi

=== Shia literature ===
- Kitāb al-tawḥīd, kitāb al-ḥujjah, and kitāb al-īmān wa'l-kufr in ʾUṣūl al-kāfī by al-Kulaynī
- Kitāb al-tawḥīd by al-Ṣadūq
- al-Iʿtiqādāt by al-Ṣadūq
- Taṣḥīḥ al-iʿtiqādāt by al-Mufīd
- Bāb ḥādī ʿašar by al-Hillī
- al-Fuṣūl al-muhimma fī uṣūl al-aʾimma by al-Ḥurr al-ʿāmilī
- al-Ḥaqq al-yaqīn by al-Majlīsī
- Shiʿite Islam Muhammad Husayn Tabataba'i: translated by Hossein Nasr; (also reprinted under the title Shi'a.)"
- Root and Branches of Faith by Maqbul Hussein Rahim
- Shi'ism Doctrines, Thought and Spirituality by Hossein Nasr

== Gallery ==
Bosniak "Book of the Science of Conduct" lists 54 religious duties that each Muslim must know about, believe in, and fulfill. Published in 1831, the handbook is by the Bosnian author and poet Abdulwahāb Žepčewī.

"Book of Wisdom" based on Islamic Theology by Khoja Akhmet Yassawi (died 1166)

"Safeguards of Transmission" by Ubayd Allāh ibn Masūd ibn Mahmud ibn Ahmad al-Mahbūbī (died 1346)

== See also ==
- Arsh
- Bid'ah
- Contemporary Islamic philosophy
- Glossary of Islam
- Outline of Islam
- Index of Islam-related articles
- Iman
- Islamic eschatology
- Islamic schools and branches
- Islamic studies
- Kafir
- Madhhab
- Schools of Islamic theology
- Shahada
- Shia–Sunni relations
- Salafi–Sufi relations
- Safavid conversion of Iran to Shia Islam
- 2016 international conference on Sunni Islam in Grozny
- Shia crescent
- Shirk
- Succession to Muhammad
- Sunnah
- Salafi–Sufi relations
- Tawhid

== Sources ==
- Emon, Anver M.; Ahmed, Rumee (2018). The Oxford Handbook of Islamic Law. Oxford University Press. ISBN 978-0-19-967901-0.
- Gimaret, D. (2012). "Uṣūl al-Dīn". Encyclopaedia of Islam New Edition Online. Brill. doi:10.1163/1573-3912_islam_sim_7760. ISSN 1573-3912.
- Steigerwald, Diana (2004). "Azhar, Al-". In Martin, Richard C. (ed.). Encyclopedia of Islam and the Muslim World (PDF). New York: Macmillan Reference USA : Thomson/Gale. pp. 92–93. ISBN 0-02-865604-0.
