= Five Pillars of Islam =

Five basic acts in Islam

The Five Pillars of Islam (arkān al-Islām أركان الإسلام; also arkān ad-dīn أركان الدين "pillars of the religion") are fundamental practices in Islam, considered to be obligatory acts of worship for all Muslims. They form the foundation of Islamic religious practice and consist of the shahada (profession of faith), salah (prayer), zakat (almsgiving), sawm (fasting during Ramadan), and hajj (pilgrimage to Mecca). Although the Five Pillars are particularly emphasized in Sunni Islam, Shia Muslims also recognize these practices as fundamental to Islam, while their classification and detailed formulation may differ.

== Translation of Rukn ==
The word rukn in Arabic refers to the corner of a building and the pillars are called umud. It is also used to refer to the basic elements or first principles of something. The arkan in military terms refers to the general staff. Thus, the translation "five principles of Islam" is more accurate than "five pillars of Islam."

== Overview ==
The ritual obligations of Muslims are called the Five Pillars. They are acknowledged and practiced by Muslims throughout the world, notwithstanding their disparities. They are viewed as compulsory for individuals who genuinely wish to pursue a life like that which Islamic prophet Muhammad led. Like other religions, Islam holds certain practices to be standard; however, that does not imply that all individuals who regard themselves as Muslims necessarily observe them. Individual participation can vary depending on the individual's faith; for example, not every individual prays every day, keeps the fast, performs the Hajj, or donates extensively to charity. There are also Muslim communities such as Alevis who reject the Five Pillars but follow Four Doors system.

Shortly after the Muslim Arabs conquered new terrains, they started raising mosques and castles and commissioning different commemorations and artifacts as articulations of their faith and culture. The religious practice of Islam, which signifies "submission to God", depends on fundamentals that are known as the Five Pillars. Each of the five pillars is alluded to in the Quran, though in various chapters (suwar). Further insights concerning these commitments are given in the Hadith.

Though comparable practices were performed in pre-Islamic Arabia and by Jews and Christians at the time of Muhammad, they were changed in the Quran and Hadith, given a carefully monotheistic center, and identified with the life of Muhammad. In the Quran, in spite of the fact that the Shahada does not show up in full, Quran 8:20 urges the individuals who accept to obey God and his Messenger. Prayer is alluded to multiple times, with prayer times referenced in Quran 20:130, and the demonstrations of bowing and prostrating in 48.29. In a few chapters, Muslims are urged both to pray and give alms (for example Q.5:12), however what, when and to whom gifts ought to be made is clarified in more detail in the hadith. There is a critical entry on fasting in the Quran (2:183-187), which alludes to the period of Ramadan and sets out the detail on who ought, and ought not fast, to a certain extent under specific conditions. Regarding the matter of the Hajj, the longest Quranic section (2:196-203) recommends the destination location of the pilgrimage, the lead and exercises of the individuals who participate, urging them to have God as a top priority consistently.

== Pillars of Sunni Islam ==
The Five Pillars of Islam

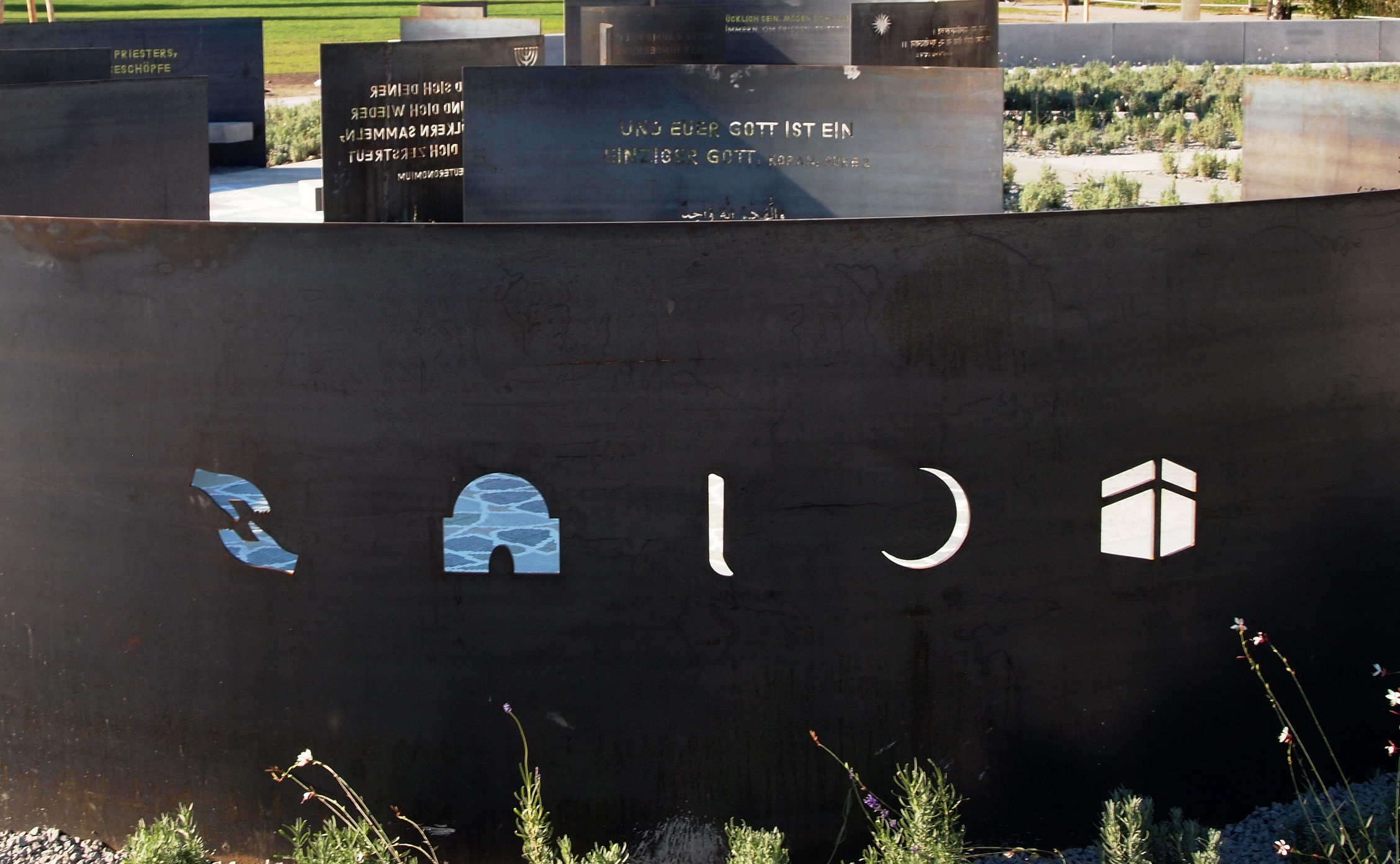
An artwork depicting the five pillars

=== First pillar: Shahada (Declaration of Faith) ===
The first pillar of Islam is the Shahada, the assertion of faith. There are two shahadas: "There is no god but God" and "Muhammad is the messenger of God". This set statement is normally recited in Arabic: lā ʾilāha ʾillā-llāhu muḥammadun rasūlu-llāh (لَا إِلٰهَ إِلَّا الله مُحَمَّدٌ رَسُولُ الله) "There is no god but God (and) Muhammad is the messenger of God." It is essential to utter it to become a Muslim and to convert to Islam.

The first shahada promotes the essential unity of the faith, proclaiming that there is no god but God. The Tawhid, which is the prayer that states "no god but God" is a major component of the Islamic faith, for it asserts the monotheistic aspect of Islam, promoting unity of God as the source of existence. The second shahada demonstrates God's essential mercy. This prayer proclaims Muhammad as the last prophet, and it uses Muhammad as the prime example of guidance for all Muslims. Muhammad received revelation that was distorted by earlier communities, such as Jewish and Christian societies; Muhammad was the recipient of the Quran's guidance himself and now is bearer of this guidance for the rest of the Muslim community throughout history.

The Shahada, or profession of faith is said five times a day during prayer. It is the first thing said to a newborn, and the last thing to a person on their death-bed, showing how the Muslim prayer and the pillars are instrumental from the day a person is born until the day they die.

=== Second Pillar: Salah (Prayer) ===
The Second Pillar of Sunni Islam is Salah, or prayer. Before a prayer is observed, ablutions are performed including washing one's hands, face and feet. A caller (Muezzin in Arabic) chants aloud from a raised place in the mosque. Verses from the Quran are recited either loudly or silently. These prayers are a very specific type of prayer and a very physical type of prayer called prostrations. These prayers are done five times a day, at set strict times, with the individual facing Mecca. The prayers are performed at dawn, noon, afternoon, evening, and night: the names are according to the prayer times: Fajr (dawn), Dhuhr (noon), ʿAṣr (afternoon), Maghrib (evening), and ʿIshāʾ (night). The Fajr prayer is performed before sunrise, Dhuhr is performed in the midday after the sun has surpassed its highest point, Asr is the evening prayer before sunset, Maghrib is the evening prayer after sunset and Isha is the night prayer. All of these prayers are recited while facing in the direction of the Kaaba in Mecca and form an important aspect of the Muslim Ummah. Muslims must wash before prayer; this washing is called wudu ("purification"). The prayer is accompanied by a series of set positions including; bowing with hands on knees, standing, prostrating and sitting in a special position (not on the heels, nor on the buttocks). At every change in position, "God is great" is said and it is a fixed tradition that has to be recited in each posture. A Muslim may perform their prayer anywhere, such as in offices, universities, and fields. However, the mosque is the preferable place for prayers because the mosque allows for fellowship. These prayers may also be observed individually if one is not able to go. The prayers are not required for women during their periods, prepubescent children and those with intellectual and physical disabilities inhibiting prayer. Those who are sick and unable to assume the positions of prayer are still required to pray, although they may pray in bed and even lying down. When traveling, one may observe the afternoon prayers following one another: also the sunset and late evening prayers can be combined too.

=== Third Pillar: Zakat (Almsgiving) ===
The Third Pillar of Islam is Zakāt, or alms giving or charity. Zakat means purification which indicates that a payment makes the rest of one's wealth legally and religiously pure. By following this pillar, Muslims have to deduct certain amount of their wealth to support the Islamic community – usually about 2.5% of their wealth. This practice is not found in the Quran but rather in the hadith. The tax is used to take good care of the holy places and mosques in the individual's specific Muslim community or to give assistance to those in need or who are impoverished. The word zakāt can be defined as purification and growth because it allows an individual to achieve balance and encourages new growth. The principle of knowing that all things belong to God is essential to purification and growth. Zakāt is obligatory for all Muslims who are able to do so. It is the personal responsibility of each Muslim to ease the economic hardship of others and to strive towards eliminating inequality. Zakāt consists of spending a portion of one's wealth for the benefit of the poor or needy, such as debtors or travelers. A Muslim may also donate more as an act of voluntary charity (sadaqah), rather than to achieve additional divine reward. Also, Muslims are required to give back to the poor, specifically through financial support, on the streets in addition to the Zakāt. Zakāt shows how the Islam faith impacts the financial situation of a believer, drawing into all aspects of life.

There are five principles that should be followed when giving the zakāt:

1. The giver must declare to God his intention to give the zakāt.
2. The zakāt must be paid on the day that it is due.
3. After the offering, the payer must not exaggerate on spending his money more than usual means.
4. Payment must be in kind. This means if one is wealthy then he or she needs to pay a portion of their income. If a person does not have much money, then they should compensate for it in different ways, such as good deeds and good behavior toward others.
5. The zakāt must be distributed in the community from which it was taken.

=== Fourth Pillar: Sawm (Fasting) ===
The Fourth Pillar of Islam is Sawm, or fasting. Fasting takes place during the daylight hours in Ramadan, which is the holy month in the Islamic calendar. Using a lunar calendar means the month of Ramadan shifts 11 days earlier each Gregorian year. Sawm is directly mentioned in the Quran: "eat and drink until the whiteness of the day becomes distinct from the blackness of the night at dawn, then complete the fast till night…". The fast occurs from dawn to sunset each day, during which time believers are expected to prohibit themselves from any food, drink, sexual intercourse, or smoking. However, after sunset and before dawn, individuals can participate in any of the actions previously stated as they desire. The reason for fasting during Ramadan is to remind Muslims that all individuals are similarly needy upon the assistance of God and that there are less lucky individuals who need their assistance. Ramadan is a period of reflection when Muslims are called upon to recharge their faith, increment their charity, and make apology. In the Quran, the month of Ramadan was first revealed to Muhammad. Ramadan fasting ends with the "Id-ul-Fitr" (Festival of the Breaking of the Fast), which lasts for three days; of the first day of this festival, there is a meeting at the mosque for prayer celebration and each family head gives money for alms.

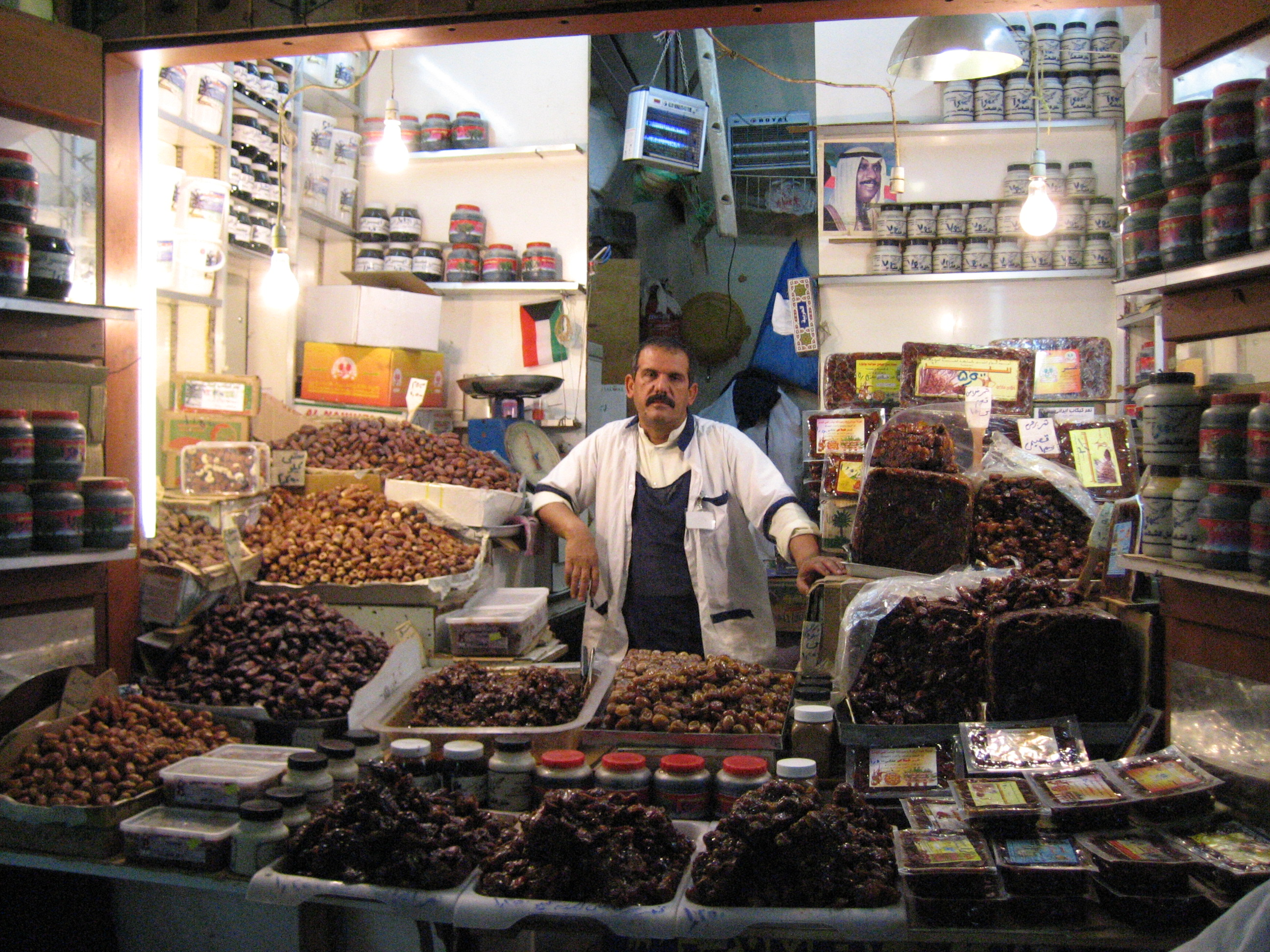
Muslims traditionally break their fasts in the month of Ramadan with dates (like those offered by this date seller in Kuwait City), as was the recorded practice (Sunnah) of Muhammad.

Three types of fasting (Siyam) are recognized by the Quran: ritual fasting, fasting as compensation for repentance (both from Quran 2), and ascetic fasting (from 33:35)

Ritual fasting is an obligatory act during the month of Ramadan. Muslims must abstain from food and drink from dawn to dusk during this month, and are to be especially mindful of other sins. Fasting is necessary for every Muslim that has reached puberty (unless they suffer from a medical condition which prevents them from doing so).

The fast is meant to allow Muslims to seek nearness and to look for forgiveness from God, to express their gratitude to and dependence on him, atone for their past sins, and to remind them of the needy. During Ramadan, Muslims are also expected to put more effort into following the teachings of Islam by refraining from violence, anger, envy, greed, lust, profane language, gossip and to try to get along with fellow Muslims better. In addition, all obscene and irreligious sights and sounds are to be avoided.

Fasting during Ramadan is obligatory, but exceptions are made for several groups for whom it would be very dangerous and excessively problematic. These include prepubescent children, those with a medical condition such as diabetes, elderly people, and pregnant or breastfeeding women. Observing fasts is not permitted for menstruating women. Other individuals for whom it is considered acceptable not to fast are those who are ill or traveling. Missed fasts usually must be made up for soon afterward, although the exact requirements vary according to circumstance.

=== Fifth Pillar: Hajj (Pilgrimage) ===
The final Pillar of Islam is the Hajj, or pilgrimage. During one's life, a Muslim is required to make the pilgrimage to Mecca during the 12th month of the lunar calendar. This ritual consists of making journey to Mecca wearing only two white sheets so all of the pilgrims are identical and there is no class distinction among them. Amid the hajj, every single Muslim man dresses alike in a straightforward fabric, again to emphasize their uniformity. Ladies wear a less complex type of their ordinary dress. Pilgrims put the white sheets on when they enter the sanctuary area of Mecca and enter a state of "ihram" or purity. After a Muslim makes the trip to Mecca, they are known as a hajj/hajja (one who made the pilgrimage to Mecca). The main rituals of the Hajj include walking seven times around the Kaaba termed Tawaf, touching the Black Stone termed Istilam, traveling seven times between Mount Safa and Mount Marwah termed Sa'yee, and symbolically stoning the Devil in Mina termed Ramee. When at Mecca, the pilgrims go to the Ka’aba in the mosque and walk around it in a circle. They then pray together in official ceremonies, and then they go out to perform the "standing ceremony" to remember the Farewell Sermon of Muhammad on the Arafat. On the return trip, pilgrims stop in Mina, where they throw seven stones at stone pillars that represent Satan as to express their hatred for Shaitan (Satan). They then return to Mecca for final ceremonies by circumambulating the Ka’aba seven times and then leave Mecca to journey back home. Inability to make the Hajj, whether because of physical strength, economic conditions, or other reasons, excuses the duty of Hajj. The Quran specifically says that only those capable of making the pilgrimage are required to do so. The reason for this journey is to follow in the footsteps of Muhammad, hoping to gain enlightenment as Muhammad did when he was in the presence of God. The pilgrimage of the Hajj is in the Quran.

The pilgrim, or the haji, is honoured in the Muslim community. Islamic teachers say that the Hajj should be an expression of devotion to God, not a means to gain social standing. The believer should be self-aware and examine their intentions in performing the pilgrimage. This should lead to constant striving for self-improvement. A pilgrimage made at any time other than the Hajj season is called an Umrah, and while not mandatory is strongly recommended.

== Pillars of Shia Islam ==
=== Twelvers ===
Twelver Shia Islam has five Usul al-Din and ten Furu al-Din, i.e., the Shia Islamic beliefs and practices. The Twelver Shia Islam Usul al-Din, equivalent to a Shia Five Pillars, are all beliefs considered foundational to Islam, and thus classified a bit differently from those listed above. They are:

1. Tawhid (monotheism: belief in the oneness of God)
2. Adl (divine justice: belief in God's justice)
3. Nubuwwah (prophecy)
4. Imamah (succession to Muhammad)
5. Mi'ad (the day of judgment and the resurrection)

In addition to these five pillars, there are ten practices that Shia Muslims must perform, called the Ancillaries of the Faith (Arabic: furūʿ al-dīn).

1. Salah: Five daily prayers
2. Sawm: Fasting Ramadan
3. Zakat: Almsgiving, similar to Sunni Islam, it applies to money, cattle, silver, gold, dates, raisins, wheat, and barley.
4. Khums: An annual taxation of one-fifth (20%) of the gains that a year has been passed on without using. Khums is paid to the Imams; indirectly to poor and needy people.
5. Hajj: Pilgrimage to Mecca
6. Jihad: Striving for the cause of God
7. Enjoining good
8. Forbidding wrong
9. Tawalla: Expressing love towards good.
10. Tabarra: Expressing disassociation and hatred towards evil.

=== Ismailis ===
Isma'ilis have their own pillars, which are as follows:

- Walayah "Guardianship" denotes love and devotion to God, the prophets, and the Ismaili Imams and their representatives
- Tawhid, "Oneness of God".
- Salah: Unlike Sunni and Twelver Muslims, Nizari Ismailis reason that it is up to the current imām to designate the style and form of prayer.
- Zakat: with the exception of the Druze, all Ismaili madhhabs have practices resembling that of Sunni and Twelvers, with the addition of the characteristic Shia khums.
- Sawm: Nizaris and Musta'lis believe in both a metaphorical and literal meaning of fasting.
- Hajj: For Ismailis, this means visiting the imām or his representative and that this is the greatest and most spiritual of all pilgrimages. The Mustaali maintain also the practice of going to Mecca. The Druze interpret this completely metaphorically as "fleeing from devils and oppressors" and rarely go to Mecca.
- Jihad "Struggle": "the Greater Struggle" and "the Lesser Struggle".

== History ==
One of the greatest assumptions about Islamic history is that the Five Pillars were already set and in place at the time of Muhammad's death in 632 CE. However, most changes to these Islamic rituals came from small differences among minority Muslim groups. The major beliefs of the Pillars were already in place, taking the shape of the life and beliefs of Muhammad. The Five Pillars are alluded to in the Quran, and some are even specifically stated in the Quran, like the Hajj to Mecca. However, the difference in practice of these traditions are accepted in Islam of the Five Pillars, but this does not mean they have all existed since the life of Muhammad. The evidence of differences shows pillars have not always been consistent to what they are today, so it has taken many years for the Pillars to get to their current and classic form.

== See also ==
- Schools of Islamic theology
- Jewish principles of faith
- Sixth Pillar of Islam

== Bibliography ==
=== Books and journals ===
- Brockopp, Jonathan; Tamara Sonn; Jacob Neusner (2000). Judaism and Islam in Practice: A Sourcebook. Routledge. ISBN 0-415-21673-7.
- Farah, Caesar (1994). Islam: Beliefs and Observances (5th ed.). Barron's Educational Series. ISBN 978-0-8120-1853-0.
- Hedayetullah, Muhammad (2006). Dynamics of Islam: An Exposition. Trafford Publishing. ISBN 978-1-55369-842-5.
- Khan, Arshad (2006). Islam 101: Principles and Practice. Khan Consulting and Publishing, LLC. ISBN 0-9772838-3-6.
- Kobeisy, Ahmed Nezar (2004). Counseling American Muslims: Understanding the Faith and Helping the People. Praeger Publishers. ISBN 978-0-313-32472-7.
- Momen, Moojan (1987). An Introduction to Shi'i Islam: The History and Doctrines of Twelver Shi'ism. Yale University Press. ISBN 978-0-300-03531-5.
- Levy, Reuben (1957). The Social Structure of Islam. UK: Cambridge University Press. OCLC 1039980285.
- Muhammad Husayn Tabatabaei (2002). Islamic teachings: An Overview and a Glance at the Life of the Holy Prophet of Islam. R. Campbell (translator). Green Gold. ISBN 0-922817-00-6.
- Arthur Goldschmidt Jr. & Lawrence Davidson (2005). A Concise History of the Middle East (8th ed.). Westview Press. ISBN 978-0-8133-4275-7.
- Hoiberg, Dale; Indu Ramchandani (2000). Students' Britannica India. Encyclopædia Britannica (UK) Ltd. ISBN 978-0-85229-760-5.
- Ridgeon, Lloyd (2003). Major World Religions (1st ed.). RoutledgeCurzon. ISBN 978-0-415-29796-7.

=== Encyclopedias ===
- P.J. Bearman; Th. Bianquis; C.E. Bosworth; E. van Donzel; W.P. Heinrichs (eds.). Encyclopaedia of Islam Online. Brill Academic Publishers. ISSN 1573-3912.
- Salamone, Frank A (2004). Salamone Frank (ed.). Encyclopedia of Religious Rites, Rituals, and Festivals (1st ed.). Routledge. ISBN 978-0-415-94180-8. OCLC 63791866.
