= Mamluki Lancet Mosque =

Mosque in Al-Masayel, Kuwait City, Kuwait

Coordinates: 29°14′13″N 48°05′29″E

Mamluki Lancet Mosque is a mosque located in Al-Masayel, Kuwait City, Kuwait. Designed by Babnimnim Design Studio, the mosque features a minimalist style with five twisted square platforms in its main structure, symbolizing the Five Pillars of Islam. The mosque has a semi-dome roof with a crescent-shaped profile. The minaret features a spiral staircase.
