= Adalah (Islam) =

Concept of divine justice in Shia Islam

- Arabic: عداله
- Romanization: Adalah
- Literal meaning: Justice

Adalah (Arabic: عدالة) means justice and denotes the Justice of God. It is among the five Shia Principles of the Religion.

Shia Muslims believe that there is intrinsic good or evil in things, and that God commands them to do the good things and shun the evil. They believe that God acts according to a purpose or design, and human reason cannot comprehend this design or purpose in its entirety (though man must always strive to understand as much as he can).

The Sunni School of thought conversely subscribes to the view that nothing is good or evil per se, and that what God commanded people to do became good by virtue of his command, and what he forbade became evil.

== Concept ==
Morteza Motahhari conceived the following meaning for justice:

1. Proportionality: consider a system with some components. For the protection of system's survival, resources should be divided proportionally between the members based on need.
2. Equality: Justice means equality and denying all forms of discrimination.
3. Justifying the rights of owner: In this view, justice is the division of resources in proportion to their potential.

=== Quran ===
In Quran Adl and Qist are two words used to describe justice. Adl means a balanced approach to all things, including life. So if a person is Adil, he is balanced morally, behaviorally, and spiritually. Also, Qist is defined as the approach regulating the human-human or human-God relations.

== Principle of Shia Theology ==
Adalah is one of the principles of the Theology of Twelvers. Allah is described by many attributes, but just Adalah is chosen as the overarching principle of Shia Twelvers' theology for the following reasons:

1. Adalah is important because other attributes of God get their meaning from it. In other word Adalah has a wide meaning as putting everything in their right places, so being The Most Merciful or The Sustainer get their meaning from Adalah.

2. Eschatology and Prophecy and Imamah as principles of the Shia Theology are closely related to Adalah.

3. At the beginning of Islam there was a conflict regarding the meaning of justice. Therefore, the Shi'a put it in the principles of religion to emphasize justice.

4. Adalah in human society is an important element of Social justice. Shia Muslim by selecting it as the principal try to achieve justice in their society.

== See also ==
- Ancillaries of the Faith
- Justice in the Quran
- Amanah (Islamic ethics)
