= Əlix =

Human settlement in Azerbaijan

Əlix Əlix
- Village
- Location in Azerbaijan
- Country: Azerbaijan
- Rayon: Qusar
- Municipality: Quturğan
- Time zone: UTC+4 (AZT)

Əlix is a village in the municipality of Quturğan in the Qusar Rayon of Azerbaijan.
