= Arkan, Iran =

Arkan (Persian: اركان) may refer to:

- Arkan, Kerman
- Arkan, North Khorasan
