= Arcan (surname) =

Arcan is a Romanian surname. Notable people with the surname include:

- Iurie Arcan (born 1964), Moldovan football player and manager
- Nelly Arcan (1973–2009), Canadian novelist
- Pietro Arcan (born 1977), Moldovan criminal and murderer
