= Twelver theology =

Five principles of Twelver Shia theology

The theology of Twelver Shi'ism contains the five principles of Shia Islam known as Uṣūl al-Dīn (Arabic: أصول الدين "Principles of the Faith").

== Definition ==
The Shia roots of religion are a set of theological beliefs, in contrast to the ten practices prescribed in the Shia ancillaries of the faith.

=== Resalah ===
All books of Resalah start with an explicit disclaimer stating that no proof shall be given for any of the points in the Usul al-dín.

The Marja' argue that it is permissible to imitate in matters of practical Islam, for example, how one is supposed to do Salat, without being familiar with evidence and arguments for the conclusions.

However, they argue that the matters in the roots of religion are much too important to be merely imitated, and it is the responsibility of each individual to make themselves personally familiar with the arguments and evidence for each article of faith.

== Articles of faith ==
There are five articles of faith in the Shia roots of religion.

=== Tawhid (oneness) ===
Tawhid (Arabic: توحيد, romanized: Tawḥīd, also spelled Tauhid or Tawheed) is the Islamic concept of monotheism. In Arabic, Tawḥīd means "unification, i.e. to unify or to keep something unified as one." In Islam, Tawḥīd means to assert the unity of God, it is not just unity of God Almighty but also Uniqueness, as defined in Quran surah 112, He is not born of anyone nor gave birth to any one, nor is any one like Him. The opposite of Tawḥīd is shirk, which means "Association" in Arabic. Muslims view polytheism and idolatry as shirk.

According to Seyyed Hossein Nasr, Ali, the first Shia Imam, is credited with having established Islamic theology and his quotations contain the first rational proofs among Muslims of the Unity of God.

Ali expresses that "God is One" means that he is away from likeness and numeration and he is not divisible even in imagination. He says:

"The first step of religion is to accept, understand and realize him as the Lord... The correct form of belief in his unity is to realize that he is so absolutely pure and above nature that nothing can be added to or subtracted from his being. That is, one should realize that there is no difference between his person and his attributes, and his attributes should not be differentiated or distinguished from his person. "

Therefore, Twelvers believe God is alone in being, along with his names, his attributes, his actions, his theophanies. The totality of being therefore is he, through him, comes from him, and returns to him. God is not a being next to or above other beings, his creatures; he is being, the absolute act of being (wujud mutlaq). For, if there were being other than he (i.e., creatural being), God would no longer be the Unique, i.e., the only one to be.

As this Divine Essence is infinite, his qualities are the same as his essence, Essentially there is one Reality which is one and indivisible. The border between theoretical Tawhid and Shirk is to know that every reality and being in its essence, attributes and action are from him(from Him-ness), it is Tawhid. Every supernatural action of the prophets is by God's permission as Quran points to it. The border between the Tawhid and Shirk in practice is to assume something as an end in itself, independent from God, not as a road to God(to Him-ness).

==== Tawhid of the essence ====
Twelvers believe that the first level of Tawhid (Monotheism) pertain to the Unity of the Divine Essence, that is the essence of God is one and peerless. His nature has not any plurality. Ali states that "nothing is similar to Him and He is One in meaning." Shia believe that God's names and attributes have no other reality than His essence. Regarding this, Quran 112 states: Say, "He is Allah, [who is] One, Allah, the Eternal Refuge. He neither begets nor is born, Nor is there to Him any equivalent." Contrary to the Tawhid, is Shirk. It is a belief that the world has more than one basis or pole, Motahari states.

Unity of the Divine Essence has two meanings:

- The Essence of God is one and peerless; nothing analogous or similar to Him is conceivable. According to the philosophical terminology, He is the First cause, the Essence of God is not in need of any cause [for Itself to exist].
- The Essence of God is not constituted by parts, and there is no sort of multiplicity and plurality in the Divine Essence. God’s nature is simple, non-compound, without any plurality.

==== Tawhid of the attributes ====
According to the Twelver, second level of Tawhid pertains to the oneness of divine attributes, that is His attributes are not separate from His essence. Ali argues that "Every attributes testifies to its being other than the object to which it is attributed, and every such object in turn testifies to its being other than the attribute." Tawhid of the attributes means to deny the existence of any sort of multiplicity and combination in the Essence itself. A differentiation between the essence and the attributes or between the attributes implies a limitation in being.

His attributes are of two kinds: attributes of perfection and attributes of imperfection. Attributes of perfection have positive nature and give a higher ontological value to the subject. Attributes of imperfection are negative and shows the lack of perfection which Quran states that God never possesses such attributes and all the positive and perfect attributes are directly related to God. As God is an absolute reality without any limitation, so his perfect attributes are limitless and infinite, too. While possessing all the positive attributes, he is beyond all the attributes.

==== Tawhid of creatorship ====
The third level of Tawhid pertains to the oneness of the source of creatorship, that is there is no creator but God, that is the causes and effects of the universe are not independent from God just as the beings which are not independent in essence. There is no power except by God, according to Motahari. He adds, to account some created things as partners of God in creation is the Shirk of Creatorship or to believe that some creatures are the agent of some actions. Just as the creatures are dependent in essence, they are dependent of influence, too. But to believe in a supernatural being who is dependent on God and is the transmitter of God's mercy to human is not Shirk.

==== Tawhid of lordship ====
The fourth level of Tawhid pertains to the oneness of lordship and of the governance of the world and man. This oneness of lordship has two aspects: creative governance (tadbir takwini), and religious governance (tadbir tashrii). At last oneness in worship, that is God alone is to be worshipped. Tawhid or Monotheism is the belief in one God or in God's Essential Oneness.

Motahari states that this level of Tawhid refers to the practice, being and becoming, i.e. bringing man into unity, the other levels of Tawhid are "seeing" but this level of Tawhid is "going". According to Islam, every choice of an orientation, ideal or a spiritual qibla is a kind of worship. He adds that Tawhid in practice is the individual's growing unified through worship of God alone by means of rejecting all kinds of counterfeit worship (such as worship of carnal desires, money or prestige) and in society's growing unified through worship of God alone by means of rejecting discrimination and injustice. So attaining to happiness is through attaining unity and attaining unity is through worshiping the Truth.

Motahari adds that to worship other than God is Shirk of Lordship, it is a kind of practice, too. Shirk in practice has levels, some of them are evident and some are very hidden which Muhammad points to it in a hadith [The progress of] shirk is more hidden than the passage of an ant over a stone on a dark night." The least of this kind of shirk is the love of injustice and the hate of justice, is religion anything other than loving and hating for God. According to the Quran, every act of obedience to an order is worshiping.

=== Adal (justice) ===
The Shias believe that there is intrinsic good or evil in things, and that God (Arabic: الله, romanized: Allāh: see God in Islam) commands them to do the good things and forbade the evil. They believe that God acts according to a purpose or design, and human reason cannot comprehend this design or purpose in its entirety (though man must always strive to understand as much as he can).

=== Nubuwwah (prophethood) ===
Nubuwwah, or "prophethood", denotes that God has appointed Prophets and Messengers to teach mankind God's message.

God has appointed prophets and messengers to teach mankind the religion (that is, a perfect system of how to live in "peace" or "submission to God"). Prophets are Messengers which are appointed by Allah to bring the message of God to people and spread that message while the Imam (leader) is appointed by Allah to protect that message since ordinary people will fail to do so. Also, as Muhammad was the last messenger of God which means the message he brought was the last and final message to the people from Allah, none is supposed to bring a message from Allah after Muhammad, therefore, if people were left with the message alone, the true message could not survive long and would have undergone changes. Imams were therefore appointed to take care of the message and prevent people from going astray after the last prophet.

=== Imamah (leadership) ===
Imamah ("leadership"): God has appointed specific leaders to lead and guide mankind—a prophet appoints a custodian of the religion before his demise. According to the Hadith of the Twelve Successors, Muhammad said that the Islamic leadership is in Quraysh (i.e. his tribe) and that 12 "imams" (also called "princes" or "caliphs") shall succeed him.

Twelver Shias believe in twelve imams. They believe eleven of the imams were killed but that the twelfth imam is still alive. It is stated that he disappeared after performing funeral rites of the eleventh imam (his father), that he is still in ghaybah (occultation) and that he will return (raj'a) of the occultation one day to bring an end to tyranny and oppression.

=== Yawm al-Qiyamah (The Day of Resurrection) ===
Yawm al-Qiyamah (Arabic: يوم القيامة, romanized: Yawm al-Qiyāmah, lit. 'Day of Resurrection' (Qur'an 71:18), also known as "the Hour" (Qur'an 31:34), "Day of the Account" (Qur'an 38:16), "Day of the Gathering", "Day of the Reckoning", "Day of Distress" (Qur'an 74:9), and the "Great Announcement") is the Arabic name for the Last Judgment. Belief in Qiyamah is part of Aqidah and is a fundamental tenet of faith in Islam. After the annihilation of this world, God will raise mankind for Judgement. The trials and tribulations of Qiyamah are detailed in both the Qur'an and the Hadith, as well as in the commentaries of the Islamic expositors and scholarly authorities. Every human, Muslim and non-Muslim alike, is held accountable for his or her deeds and are judged by God accordingly (Qur'an 74:38).

== See also ==
- Imamah (Twelver Shi`i Doctrine)
- Shi'a Islamic beliefs and practices

General:

- Islamic theology
- Five Pillars of Islam
- Major religious groups
