= Knarçay =

Coordinates: 41.36525°N 48.07089°E

Kənarçay (also, Kenarchay) is a village in the municipality of Guturghan in the Qusar District of Azerbaijan.
