= Quturğan =

Coordinates: 41°22′N 48°03′E

Quturğan ( also, Guturghan) is a village and municipality in the Qusar District of Azerbaijan. It consists of the villages of Quturğan, Arçan, Knarçay, and Əlix and has a population of 757.
