= Arçan =

Coordinates: 41°22′00″N 48°03′00″E

Arçan is the Lezgin village in the municipality of Quturğan in the Qusar Rayon of Azerbaijan.
