= Tawalla and tabarru' =

Concepts in Shia Islam

The Arabic pair tawalla-tabarru' and the closely related pair walaya-bara’a both refer to the following complementary concepts in Shia Islam: Tawalla and walaya denote the unconditional loyalty, alliance, devotion, love, and obedience of Shia Muslims toward their imams and the Islamic prophet Muhammad (d. 632), while tabarru’ (tabarra in Persian) and bara’a signify their dissociation and detachment from enemies of Muhammad, imams, and imams' followers. Both pairs can be translated as affiliation-dissociation or avowal-disavowal.

== Significance ==
In Shia Islam, walaya characterizes the spiritual bond between followers and their imams, a bond that surpasses politics and self-interest. So central is this concept that the defining feature of Shia Islam is walaya toward Ali ibn Abi Talib (d. 661 CE), the first Shia imam, and later imams from his descent. (Note: Various branches of Shia Islam, however, disagree about the identity of imams after Ali.) Twelvers, the largest branch of Shias, even consider walaya-bara'a a requirement for acceptance of one's good deeds. This love and devotion to imams, Shia scholars argue, is due not just because of imams' noble descent but also because of their virtues and merits. Shia scholars also contend that obedience to imams benefits the believers first and foremost, for imams are regarded therein as vehicles for salvation of their followers. The term walaya (or wilaya) also conveys the all-encompassing political and religious authority of Shia imams, for most Shias regard their imams as divinely-ordained successors of Muhammad.

Bara’a is either subsumed by or viewed as a necessary complement to walaya. Especially the former may be kept hidden under persecution but otherwise manifested in imprecations or social ostracism, such as withholding alms tax from enemies and not praying behind them. By practicing tawalla-tabarru’, it is said, one can take sides in the eternal fight between good and evil or, in Shia vocabulary, the fight between forces of knowledge and ignorance. Love and respect for Muhammad and his progeny is also exercised in Sunni Islam, and open enmity with them is rare among Muslims, but the Shia practice of tawalla-tabarru’ is nevertheless condemned by hardline Sunnis, such as Hanbalis.

== History ==
Early in the Islamic history, rather than sects, some Muslims belonged to communities, the boundaries of which were defined through affiliation with one's co-religionists and dissociation from everyone else. Ali ibn Abi Talib was reportedly not very fond of excommunicating other Muslims during his tumultuous caliphate (r. 656–661), which coincided with the first Muslim civil war. Nevertheless, some of his followers and their enemies did practice bara'a, and the related terminology appears in the unconditional public pledge of allegiance (bay'ah) offered to Ali before the Battle of Nahrawan (658) against the Kharijites, who had earlier left Ali’s camp. Kharijites themselves practiced tawalla-tabarru', as evidenced by their many instances of violence against civilians who supported Ali.

Probably in the second century of Islam, bara'a was extended beyond Ali's enemies during his caliphate to include the majority of Muhammad’s companions, especially Abu Bakr (r. 632–634) and Umar (r. 634–644), the first and second caliphs, respectively. Later imams augured that Abu Bakr and Umar had usurped the caliphate from Ali, Muhammad's designated successor at the Ghadir Khumm (632), and most companions either participated or acquiesced to this power grab. Walaya-bara’a thus became an article of faith under Shia imams, particularly Muhammad al-Baqir (d. 732) and Ja'far al-Sadiq (d. 765), respectively, the fifth and sixth of the twelve imams in Twelver Shi'ism. Yet al-Baqir, for instance, is not known to have publicly reviled Abu Bakr and Umar, most likely because he exercised religious dissimulation (taqiyya), for imams and their followers were relentlessly persecuted in that period.

Those who were perceived to be altering imams' teachings were also excommunicated by imams, but they also warned their followers not to dissociate from those who differed in harmless ways, ascribing such differences to many levels of faith. Imams even discouraged dissociation from those non-Shias who were not hostile. Such non-Shias, it was argued, were not true believers (sing. mu’min) but they still counted as Muslims and were entitled to their legal rights. Excommunication is still occasionally exercised today by some Shia scholars. The term bara’a also appears in the Quran, the central text of Islam, late in Muhammad's career, probably around 630–632. This Quranic message of dissociation from disbelievers may have been delivered in Mecca by Ali on behalf of Muhammad.

== See also ==
- Ancillaries of the Faith
- Walaya
