= Arkan, Kerman =

Arkan اركان
- Village
- Location within Iran
- Coordinates: 29°15′46″N 56°25′02″E
- Country: Iran
- Province: Kerman
- County: Baft
- Bakhsh: Central
- Rural District: Fathabad

Population (2006)
  - Total: 124
- Time zone: UTC+3:30 (IRST)
  - Summer (DST): UTC+4:30 (IRDT)

Arkan (Persian: اركان, also Romanized as Ārkān) is a village in Fathabad Rural District, in the Central District of Baft County, Kerman Province, Iran. At the 2006 census, its population was 124, in 27 families.
