= Arkan Mubayed =

Syrian footballer (born 1983)

Personal information
- Date of birth: 28 March 1983 (age 43)
- Place of birth: Latakia, Syria
- Positions: Defender; midfielder

Team information
- Current team: Al-Yarmouk

Youth career
- Hutteen

Senior career*
Years	Team	Apps	(Gls)
2002–2013	Hutteen		
2013	Al-Yarmouk		

International career^{‡}
2004	Syria U-20		
- * Club domestic league appearances and goals ‡ National team caps and goals as of 9 August 2013

Arkan Mubayed (Arabic: أركان مبيض; born 28 March 1983 in Latakia) is a Syrian footballer who currently plays for Al-Yarmouk in Jordan.
