= Prophecy (Shia Islam) =

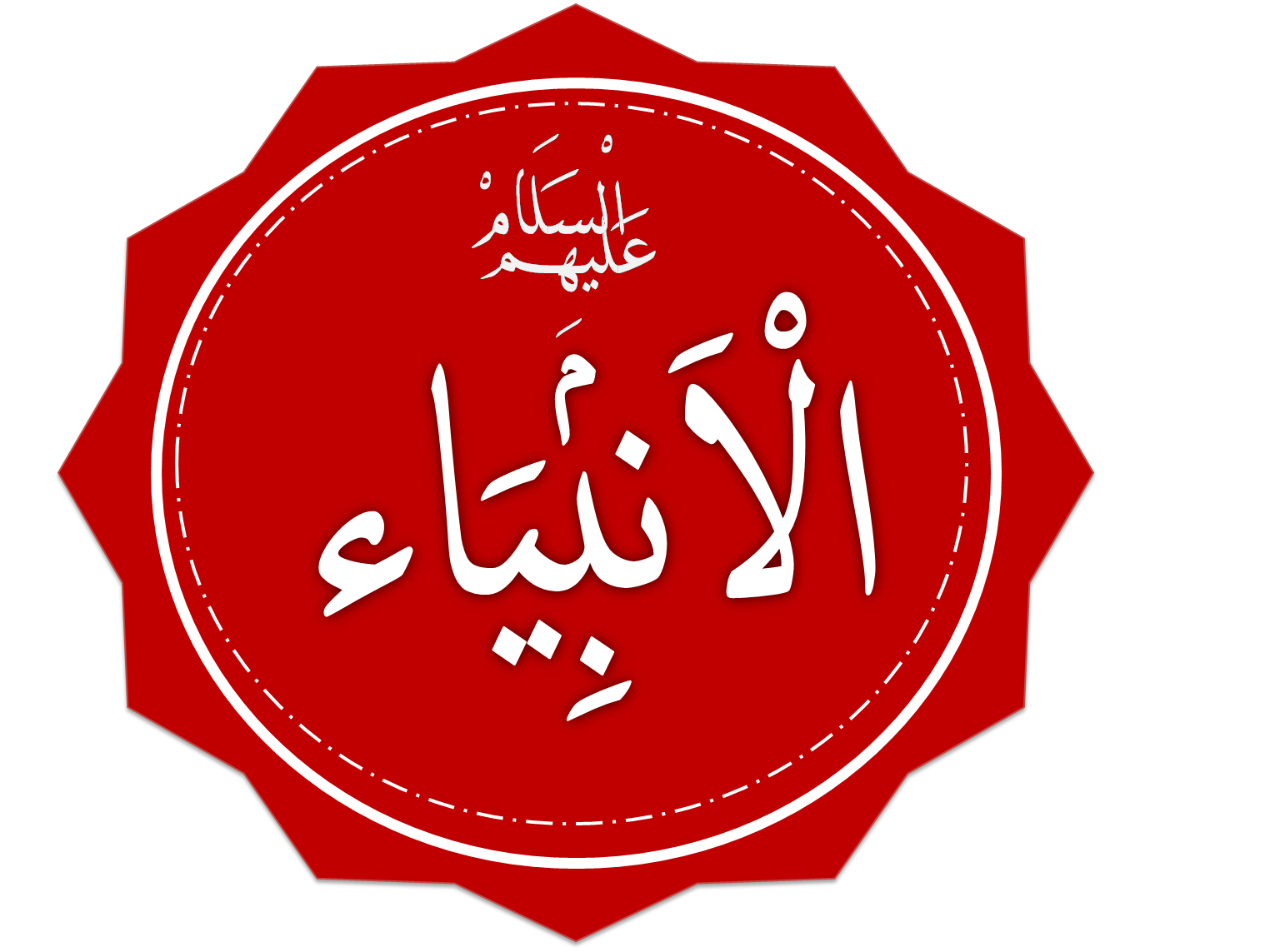
Arabic word "Anbiya" (means prophets)

In Islam, prophecy (Arabic: نبوة, romanized: nubuwwah) is the principle that God has appointed exemplary individuals, i.e. prophets and messengers to communicate His guidance to humanity. This is one of the five principles of the Twelver Principles of Religion.

According to Henry Corbin, the oldest traditions that form the basis of Islamic prophetology come from the teachings of the Shia Imams, and Shia milieu was propitious for the rise, study and development of this scholastic field. He holds that "divine science" is not an ordinary science, impossible to communicate in the conventional manner, except by a prophet. The circumstances of this communication is the object of Islamic prophetology. According to the Ayatollah Ja'far Sobhani, prophets are the medium for the flow of Divine grace to humans who have been sent down by God since first humans had deserved it until the time of Muhammad prophet of Islam. For guidance of servants of God, prophets should possess some qualities: Wahy (God's word is delivered by his chosen individuals – known as Messengers prophets – to mankind), Ismah (moral infallibility) and Miracle.

== Etymology ==
In the Quran, both "prophet" (نبي, nabī) and "messenger" (رسول, rasūl) is used to refer to those with God-inspired ministry. There are differences between a prophet and a messenger. The Twelver scholar Sa'id Akhtar Rizvi stated that a "messenger" (rasūl) brings a new religious law, while those who don't are called a "prophet" (nabī).

== The necessity of prophecy ==
According to Henry Corbin, the oldest traditions that form the basis of Islamic prophetology come from the teachings of the Shia Imams, and Shia milieu was propitious for the rise, study and development of this scholastic field. Henry Corbin holds that "divine science" is not an ordinary science, impossible to communicate in the conventional manner, except by a prophet. The circumstances of this communication is the object of Islamic prophetology. According to the view of Ayatollah Ja'far Sobhani, the wise God has appointed prominent individuals to guide humans. They have been chosen to deliver messages of God to human. Prophets are the medium for the flow of Divine grace to humans who have been sent down by God since first humans had deserved it until the time of Muhammad prophet of Islam. Since creation of humanity is the act of a wise God it follows a purpose, and considering that humans, in addition to animalistic instincts, possess intellect, this purpose has to be reasonable. On the other hand, human intellect is a necessary means of his evolution, but is not sufficient. Imperfection of human intellect is evidenced in constant controversies over economic, ethical, family and other issues in his life etc. that have resulted in conflicting philosophies. Based on these contemplations, a sound mind rules that consistent with Divine wisdom, leaders and teachers have to be inspired to teach humans the correct way of life.

=== In view of the Quran ===
The following reasons have been mentioned in the Quran for Divine appointment of prophets:

1. Strengthening the foundations of Tawhid (the oneness [of God]) and fight against any deviation as in sura An-Nahl, verse 36: "And We certainly sent into every nation a messenger, [saying], "Worship Allah and avoid Taghut." And among them were those whom Allah guided, and among them were those upon whom error was [deservedly] decreed. So proceed through the earth and observe how was the end of the deniers". On the purpose of Prophethood, Ali ibn Abi Talib, the first Shia Imam and cousin and son-in-law of Muhammad, in a sermon during his caliphacy, has said that Allah assigned the prophets mission to teach the servants of God about Tawhid and attributes of God.
2. To acquaint people with the divine teachings and the manner of purification of the soul as in sura Al-Jumua, verse 2: "It is He who has sent among the unlettered a Messenger from themselves reciting to them His verses and purifying them and teaching them the Book and wisdom - although they were before in clear error –"
3. To establish justice in human society, as in sura Al-Hadid verse 25 : "We have already sent Our messengers with clear evidences and sent down with them the Scripture and the balance that the people may maintain [their affairs] in justice".
4. To judge disputes among humans as in sura Al-Baqara, verse 213 :" Mankind was [of] one religion [before their deviation]; then Allah sent the prophets as bringers of good tidings and warners and sent down with them the Scripture in truth to judge between the people concerning that in which they differed. And none differed over the Scripture except those who were given it - after the clear proofs came to them - out of jealous animosity among themselves."
5. As a final ‘hujjah’ (argument, proof, guarantee) for servants of God, as in sura An-Nisa verse 165 :" [We sent] messengers as bringers of good tidings and warners so that mankind will have no argument against Allah after the messengers. And ever is Allah Exalted in Might and Wise". In Shia Islam, Prophets and Imams are considered to be God's proof for humankind.

== Qualities of prophets ==
For guidance of servants of God, prophets should possess some qualities:

=== Wahy ===
According to the thesis of general guidance, elaborated by Tabataba’i, God guides the development of every creature towards a final end that represents its full perfection. Like plants and animals, humans are also subject to this general guidance; however, given man's distinguishing feature which is his faculty of intellect, he is, in addition, in need of a special form of guidance in order to acquire his respective perfection. Man as a thinking species realizes the importance of social cooperation and law for his survival and happiness, but he is unable by the virtue of his reason alone to arrive at the true universal laws that are necessary for governance of his personal and social life. "If it had been in the very nature of things that it be the duty of human reason to create a perfect common law which must provide happiness for human society, and that man should be guided to that perfect law through the process of creation and the generation of the world itself, then such laws would have been apprehended by each human being through his reason in the same way that man knows what is of benefit or detriment to him throughout the determined course of daily life." Therefore, there has to be another power of apprehension to help humanity understand his real duties and one that makes this knowledge available to all. This power which is different from human intellect and sense, is the prophetic consciousness or the consciousness of revelation.

According to Morteza Motahhari, divine revelation to the Prophet has some characteristics that distinguish it from other forms of inspiration:

1. Internality: Revelation is a form of internal realization that does not rely on sense perception. This is evident in psychological conditions that affected the Prophet of Islam while receiving revelation, such as fainting and disconnection from the external world.
2. Being taught: In the process of revelation, Prophet is subject to an act of teaching by a mysterious authority who informs him about things he does not know by his own virtue or through conventional methods of learning.
3. Consciousness of the source: During the process of revelation, the Prophet has a clear consciousness of the fact that he's being enlightened by an external transcendent source, just as a schoolchild is aware that he is being taught by a human teacher.
4. Consciousness of the medium: Revelation often occurs via mediation of a being usually referred to as Gabriel or the Holy Spirit. Unlike instinctual or poetic inspiration, Prophet is fully aware of the existence of this medium and its role.

=== Ismah ===
Prophets were individuals with claim of prophecy and revelation. They provide proofs to back up their claim. They brought forth elements of Divine religion i.e. the divine law that guarantees happiness of humankind, and made it available to all. Moreover, since the number of prophets with power of prophecy and revelation has been small, Allah has provided guidance to the rest of humanity through the prophets themselves. For prophets to be able to fulfill this role, they have to possess the quality of inerrancy.

=== Miracle ===
Prophets who are able to receive and declare Divine doctrines and laws through Revelation, first need to prove their claim of connection with the transcendent world to the people before expecting them to submit to their religion. Indeed, historically people have demanded prophets proof of their prophecy, and the Quran has recognized the legitimacy of this demand. This demand for proof is answered by acts of miracle by Prophets. Miracles are not logically impossible acts, but rather are a "break in what is habitual" (kharq-i ‘adat), a phenomenon that is often observed in a lower degree among ascetics.

According to Ja'far Sobhani, there are distinctions between Divine miracles and acts that simply break the ordinary affair of things:

1. Miracles cannot be taught: the person who presents a miracle performs that without any training background, whereas other forms of extraordinary acts such as magic are a result of training and exercise.
2. Miracle is undefiable: Since miracle emanates from the Divine infinite power, they cannot be reproduced and equaled by other extraordinary works such as witchcraft.
3. Variety: Miracles shown by Divine messengers have been diverse e.g. turning a stick into a dragon, splitting the sea, blowing a bird sculpture into a live dove, healing the sick, raising the dead, etc. miracles of Divine messengers don’t follow any fixed prototype.
4. Performers of miracles differ from performers of magic in aim and character. Prophets follow lofty aims whereas magicians pursue worldly ends, each influencing their characters in distinct ways.

== Walayah ==
As Corbin mentioned in History of Islam, prophecy and walayah (authority or guardianship) are among Shia doctrines. One of them is the absolute prophecy that is general and another is particular prophecy. The first one corresponds to Muhammadan Reality from the beginning to eternity. The latter is subordinate to the former and corresponds to prophecy of a particular prophet. For example, the prophecy of the prophet of Islam, Mohammad is the seal of the prophecy. Corbin defines the walayah as the esoteric aspect of eternal prophecy. Walayah is likewise divided into two forms: the absolute walayah and the particular walayah. The prophecy of each prophet emanates from absolute prophecy and according to the Shia doctrine, the walayah of all the men of God ends in the Twelfth Imam, Muhammad al-Mahdi.
