= Imamate in Twelver doctrine =

Concept in the largest branch of Shia Islam

Imāmah (Arabic: إِمَامَة) means "leadership" and is a concept in Twelver theology. The Twelve Imams are the spiritual and political successors to Muhammad, the Prophet of Islam, in the Twelver branch of Shia Islam. According to Twelver theology, the successors to Muhammad are infallible human beings, who rule justly over the community and maintain and interpret sharia and undertake the esoteric interpretation of the Quran. The words and deeds of Muhammad and the Imams guide the community. For this, the Imams must be free from error and sin and chosen by divine decree—nass—through the Prophet.

Shi'a believe that divine wisdom—'Aql—is the source of the souls of the Prophets and Imams and gives them esoteric knowledge—hikmah—and that their suffering is a means by which their devotees may acquire divine grace. The Imam is not the recipient of divine revelation, but has a close relationship with God, who guides him, allowing the Imam in turn to guide others. The Imamat, or belief in the divine guide, is a fundamental belief in Shia Islam and is based on the concept that God would not leave humanity without access to divine guidance.

According to the Twelvers, an Imam of the Age is always the divinely appointed authority on all matters of faith and law. Ali was the first Imam in this line and in the view of Twelvers the rightful successor to Muhammad, followed by the male descendants of Muhammad through his daughter Fatimah. Each Imam was the son of the previous Imam, with the exception of Husayn ibn Ali, who was the brother of Hasan ibn Ali. The twelfth and final Imam is Muhammad al-Mahdi, who is believed by the Twelvers to be alive and in hiding.

== Function of imam ==
The office of imamate is bestowed upon the figure of imam (lit. 'leader' or 'master'), whose function in Sunni Islam is to implement the divine law and manage the community affairs. In this sense, imam is synonymous to caliph in Sunni Islam as the highest temporal authority, but this authority is limited and mundane.

In Shia Islam, the figure of imam dominates the belief system. Necessarily a descendant of the Islamic prophet Muhammad, imam is the supreme leader that combines both temporal and religious authorities, for the two were combined in Muhammad. Various Shia sects disagreed over the identity of these imams.

In Twelver Shi’ism, Muhammad is believed to have been succeeded by a line of twelve imams from his descent, who also inherited his divine knowledge of religion. Even though these twelve imams are thought to have been entitled, through a divine mandate, to the temporal authority to manage Muslim affairs, their status in Twelver Shi’ism does not depend upon it, as they instead owe their status to their divinely-sanctioned designation by their predecessors (nass). Temporal leadership only materialized for the first of the twelve imams, Ali ibn Abi Talib, who reigned from 661 CE until his assassination in 665.

=== Exoteric function ===
Whereas Muhammad brought divine revelation and taught divine law to his followers, the twelve imams interpreted the revelation and safeguarded the religion against innovations in their capacity as law-givers and guardians of religion. At this exoteric level, many teachings of these imams are general enough to be accepted by Sunnis, who regard many of the imams as outstanding religious scholars.

=== Esoteric function ===
In addition to their exoteric function, the twelve imams, by virtue of their divine knowledge, are regarded as the sole authoritative guides toward salvation, as they initiated a small group of their followers into esoteric aspects of the religion. This function of imams, as spiritual guides after Muhammad, is known as walaya or wilaya, which is described as the esoteric aspect of prophecy. In his capacity as an imam, Muhammad was also a spiritual guide. Walaya also denotes the exclusive religio-political authority of imams.

To sum, in Twelver Shi'ism, the twelve imams hold the ultimate religious authority, both in matters of law and spiritual guidance, as an extension of Muhammad's authority. Their duty is essentially threefold: first, rule the community as Muhammad's rightful successors, second, teach hidden aspects of the revelation and authoritatively interpret ambiguous verses of the Quran, and third, guide men in their spiritual life.

At an even more esoteric level, imams are often regarded as intermediaries between God and mankind. In this world, they are thought to be the cause for the creation, and the source of sustenance and divine blessings for creatures, thus maintaining all life on Earth. In the hereafter, they intercede for many, especially for their followers. By contrast, the prerogative of intercession is limited to the Islamic prophet in Sunni Islam. However, some Shia scholars reject such supernatural functions.

== Existence of imam ==
In Twelver Shi'ism, existence of imam is regarded as a continuous and rational necessity. For instance, one rational argument in favor of imamate contends that mankind has a permanent need for a divinely-guided (infallible) leader and an authoritative teacher in religion, one that would expound the divine law and correctly interpret the revelation. As the high custodian of religion, this leader would also execute the divine law and judge among men. Existence of such a leader, it is argued, is necessary for the welfare and salvation of the community.

Providing this figure, called imam, is therefore incumbent upon God at any moment, as an obligatory grace (lutf wajib), for He acts in the best interest of His creation. Conversely, absence of such an imam would imply that God is both uncaring, for He has neglected His creation, and unjust, for He would punish men without providing them with right guidance. Just as it is incumbent upon God to send prophets who would teach mankind divine knowledge, it is incumbent upon Him to preserve and expound this knowledge through imams. That is, imamate in Twelver Shi'ism is regarded as the continuation of prophecy.

It is thus argued that imamate is a continuous necessity, that is, Earth has never been devoid of imams. There could only be one such imam at any time. As long as he lived, his successor would be a silent (samit) imam.

== Qualifications of imam ==
Divine designation and divine knowledge, both of which the imam inherits through his successor from Muhammad, are the key markers of imamate in Twelver Shi'ism.

=== Divinely-sanctioned designation (nass) ===
In Twelver doctrine, imamate is confined to certain descendants of the Islamic prophet Muhammad, from the marriage of his daughter Fatima to his cousin Ali ibn Abi Talib. Every imam is believed to have been designated by his predecessor through a divine mandate, going back successively to the announcement of Muhammad about Ali ibn Abi Talib at the Ghadir Khumm, shortly before the former died in 630. According to Twelvers, the imamate was inherited after Ali by his eldest son Hasan, then by his other son Husayn, and then successively inherited by nine of Husayn's descendants. That is, these twelve imams owe their legitimacy to “apostolic succession,” rather than political leadership.

Except the first three of them, these imams were effectively apolitical. More specifically, they all had claims to political leadership, but did not come forward for they would have been persecuted. The alternative theory is that many of them did not have any political claims at all. At any rate, this hereditary nature of imamate obviously closed the field to outside claimants. Divinely-sanctioned designation (nass) is often accompanied in Shia sources by inheritance of secret religious scrolls and prophet's weapons. The latter paralleled the Ark of the Covenant for the Israelites.

Nass is regraded as a logical necessity in the Twelver doctrine, in which imams are thought to have been infallible, that is, immune from sin and error. Only an infallible imam can correctly identify his infallible successor. The appointment of imam must also be sanctioned by God, for infallibility is a hidden virtue known to God. In particular, the fallible community has no voice in appointing infallible imams, or prophets for that matter.

=== Divinely-inspired knowledge (ilm) ===
Rather than political power, the Twelver doctrine of imamate revolves around the esoteric knowledge (ilm) of their quiescenct imams, who are thought to have successively inherited Muhammad's divine knowledge about God. Twelvers hold that their imams did not receive revelation as prophets did but were still divinely-inspired. Imams were spoken to by angels, but, unlike prophets, could not see the angels. Imams are also said to have inherited certain secret texts, such as Sahifa, Jafr, Jami’a, Mushaf of Fatima. For example, Jami'a supposedly contains the knowledge of what is licit and illicit.

Imams thus perfectly knew exoteric aspects of the religion, such as tradition and jurisprudence, and its esoteric aspects, such as hidden and allegorical interpretations of the Quran, to the point that imam is also called the “speaking Quran.” The near consensus among Twelver scholars is that imams did not have knowledge of the unseen (ilm al-ghiyb), but were granted glimpses of it as a divine favor. This was the opinion of al-Mufid (d. 1022), Sharif al-Murtada (d. 1044), al-Tusi (d. 1067), three prominent Twelver scholars.

Alternatively, some have argued that imams were omniscient or nearly so, including Ibn Babawayh (d. 991), another prominent Twelver scholar. It is thus said that imams knew the greatest name of God (ism Allah al-a’zam), the past, the present, and the future. At an even more esoteric level, imams are thought to have manifested the knowable God, that is, what can be known about God to His creation.

== Other features of imam ==
=== Infallibility ===
As with the Islamic prophet Muhammad, the twelve imams are regarded as infallible in Twelver Shi'ism, that is, protected from sin and error through divine grace. The scope of this isma has been debated, but at least covers imams’ religious rulings and views.

Infallibility (isma) of imams, in their capacity as divinely-sanctioned leaders, is viewed as a logical necessity in Twelver Shi'ism lest the religion is corrupted, or people are led astray. This infallibility, however, is not viewed as inability to sin. Rather, the esoteric knowledge of prophets and imams, for instance, their vivid understanding of God's punishment, produces a faculty that prevents them from disobedience of God. That is, their infallibility is a byproduct of their divine knowledge. Verse 2:124 is one of the Quranic verses cited to support the infallibility of imams, in which all wrongdoers are excluded from imamate.

=== Best of men ===
Each imam is the best of men (afdal al-nas) in his time, that is, most excellent among them in religious qualities, for otherwise, it is argued, God would have appointed someone else as the imam. Similarly, it is argued that imams must be foremost in observing the religious values that they preach. Imamate is ranked even higher than prophethood in Twelver Shi'ism, citing the Quranic story in verse 2:124, where Abraham is promoted to imamate when he is already a prophet.

In particular, there is total consensus that the twelve imams are the most superior amongst humans born on Earth following Muhammad's birth, with some saying that they even exceed some or even all prophets except Muhammad himself. This is often justified because Muhammad inherited the total knowledge of all prophets, and the twelve imams in turn inherited Muhammad's superior knowledge, although, historically there have been disagreements on the twelve imams ranking in contrast to the other prophets with a cohort even believing that the twelve imams do not exceed any prophet at all.

Amongst the twelve imams themselves, some are believed to have been equal in knowledge, although some of them, like Ali ibn Abi Talib (and Hassan and Hussain to a lesser extent), may have been superior to the rest in rank. This also implied that every new piece of divine knowledge was presented first to the imam's predecessors and then to him.

Generally, prophecy and imamate may be joined in a person. That is, virtually all known (i.e. named) prophets in Islam, including Muhammad, were also imams in that they too possessed the esoteric knowledge of religion as well as brought new revelations. Yet not every imam was a prophet for some imams did not bring new divine revelation, but rather simply executed it such as Simon Peter, the successor of Jesus.

=== Most beautiful names of God ===
In Twelver doctrine, Muhammad and the twelve imams are regarded as the highest manifestations of the most beautiful names of God (al-asma’ al-husna), which are the qualities that describe the knowable God, that is, those descriptions of God which are manifested in his creation. For instance, God is indulgent (afuww) and vengeful (muntaqim), satisfied (radi) and angry (sakhit). Imams are thus the best representatives of God's attributes; they are His image and face; the perfect human beings (al-insan al-kamil).

In particular, knowing imams is equivalent to knowing (the knowable) God, which is in turn the ultimate goal of the creation. It is in this sense that the imam is said to be the Proof of God (hujjat Allah), the Vicar of God (khakifat Allah), and the Threshold of God (bab Allah). In particular, as the divinely-sanctioned guide, imam is the highest proof (hujjat) of God on Earth and His evidence on the judgement day against those who deny or disobey Him.

=== Light of God ===
The fourteen infallibles are said to have been a primordial light that became the cause and instrument for the rest of the creation. This so-called Muahammadan light was carried through the line of prophets, beginning with Adam, until it became embodied in the fourteen infallibles. Through this divine light the imams illuminate the hearts of believers, guiding them toward God. This divine light is also said to be responsible for the infallibility of imams.

=== Intercession ===
It is believed that the fourteen infallibles will intercede for the Muslim community in the hereafter, through which their sins will be overlooked or they will reach a higher spiritual status. It is the Shia community, however, that will especially benefit from this intercession (shafa'a). Just as the imams, particularly Husayn, patiently endured suffering, privation, rejection and persecution on Earth, they will be exalted and vindicated by God in the hereafter, sharing in His sovereignty over the creation through intercession, a prerogative which they will share with their true followers, who had in turn suffered for imams’ sake. Yet this absolutist perspective has been curtailed by emphasizing that intercession is only accessible to the virtous and pious.

=== Wali ===
The word wali and its cognate mawla can mean 'Lord', 'master', 'trustee', 'guardian', 'helper', 'protecting friend', 'freed slave', and (spiritual or material) 'heir'. First, wali Allah (lit. 'friend of God') signifies the nearness of imam to God, who reveals to him His secrets, and grants him authority over His creation. Second, imam and wali is the supreme spiritual guide, and the exclusive religio-political authority after Muhammad.

=== Political aspect ===
The Shia believe that only the divinely chosen one is the legitimate leader of the community who owns some spiritual gifts. The first of these leaders was Ali ibn Abi Talib and his successors were the descendants of the prophet and the heirs of the charisma of Ali. Imams possess all the attributes, duties, authorities of the prophet except receiving revelation. They are the political and religious guardians over the community. Although Imam has a political role, his Imamah does not depend on this role. According to verse 5:55, because absolute authority belongs to Allah, He can grant this authority to whomever He wishes as Guardians. Muhammad Baqir al-Sadr stated that the political and spiritual dimensions are inseparable.

== Walaya to imams ==
In Twelver belief, Muslims have a religious duty to know their imam, and those who die without knowing their imam have died a death of ignorance (Jahilliya), a reference to a well-attested prophetic saying. At an esoteric level, knowing the imams is said to be equivalent to knowing what can be known about God, for imams embody the knowable God, that is, His revealed “face” for His creation.

As rightful successors to Muhammad and exclusive heirs to his divine knowledge, the twelve imams are owed the same level of loyalty in Twelver Shi'ism as Muhammad. Not only absolute obedience to them is obligatory, love for them is also mandated in the Quranic verse of the mawadda, according to Twelver (and some Sunni) exegetes. Through this love and obedience, it is argued, followers would benefit from imams’ exoteric and esoteric guidance. the above all-encompassing bond of spiritual loyalty that binds true followers to their imams is called walaya, transcending politics and self-interest.

Walaya is the condition for the acceptance of all good deeds and salvation, It is regraded as a pillar of the faith (iman), and what elevates (true) Shias over the rest of Muslims, who have merley submitted to the exoteric Islam. As for the absence of walaya, enemies of imams are disbelievers (sing. kafir), who are not entitled to Muslim rights. Yet there is a gray area in between, for a Muslim who does not harbor enmity towards imams and their followers is neither a (true) believer mu'min nor disbeliever. That is, such non-Shias are considered Muslims, with their due legal rights, but not (true) believers.

== Imamate and revelation (Wahy) ==
As Muhammad was the last person to receive revelation, the Imams receive divine inspiration (elham) and, as such, are in contact with the holy source of knowledge. A hadith narrates that "Imam hears the voice of the Angel, but does not have his vision, either in sleep or in waking". Imams get Revelation but not like the prophets. They are called Muhaddatht and are spoken to by angels via sounds through their ears and are supported by the Holy Spirit. They receive additional information on the Night of Power Laylat al-Qadr. They make Spiritual Ascension to the Divine Throne on Friday to add their knowledge.

== Arguments ==
=== Shia view of Quran ===
Shias claim the verse of Light (24:35) is attributed to The Fourteen Infallible. According to Shia sources on the nature and basis of Imamate, H al-Baqir emphasizes that verse 5:55 refers to Ali. According to al-Baqir's interpretation of verse 35:32, Imams are "Then we caused to inherit the Book those We have chosen of Our servants". Shias mind verse 4:59, which signifies a perfect love and obedience to divine guides.

Other Shia sources claim that Imams are expressed in Quran as: "the Supreme Sign" (al-Ayat al-Kobra) (79:20), "the August Symbol" (al-Mathal al-a'la) (16:60), "the Most Solid Handle" (al-Urwat al-Wuthqa) (2:256), (31:22). According to al-Baqir Imams are the Light of Allah (64:8, 57:28). These verses (28:68, 2:30, 38:26, 2:124, 21:73) state that Imamate is a divine appointment and a fallible person can not be an Imam.

Wilferd Madelung, regarding the blood ties which is found in Quran, states the superiority of Ali for his succession. Regarding verse 2:124, Tabataba'i states that Imamah is a divine status, Imam must be Ma'sum (infallible), the earth can not be without an Imam, Imam have the complete knowledge which is related to this world and the next of the people, Imam excels all people in all virtues. However it is argued by many scholars that the 12 Shia Imams have not been mentioned in the Quran.

=== By reason ===
Al-Baqir states that while people need a guide for their journey to a strange place, their journey to heaven is stranger and more in need of a guide. Al-Mufid states that an Imam is necessary for defining the exact laws that are obligatory upon the Muslims. Many verses in Quran are ambiguous, revelation of Quran without further explanation is unlikely from Allah. While Imamate brings the people nearer to obedience and away from disobedience, it is Grace (Lutf) that is incumbent of Allah.

Regarding rejecting the Imamah-doctrine, Allamah Al-Hilli, a 14th century Shi'a Twelver Islamic scholar, writes: "Imamah is a universal grace (lutf ‘amm) while Nubuwwah (prophethood) is a special grace (lutf khass), it is possible that a specific period in time can be void of a living Nabi while the same is not true for the Imam. To reject universal grace is worse than to reject any special grace. The prophet founded an eternal Shari'ah for all the times and this eternal religion could not continue without a leader.

== History ==
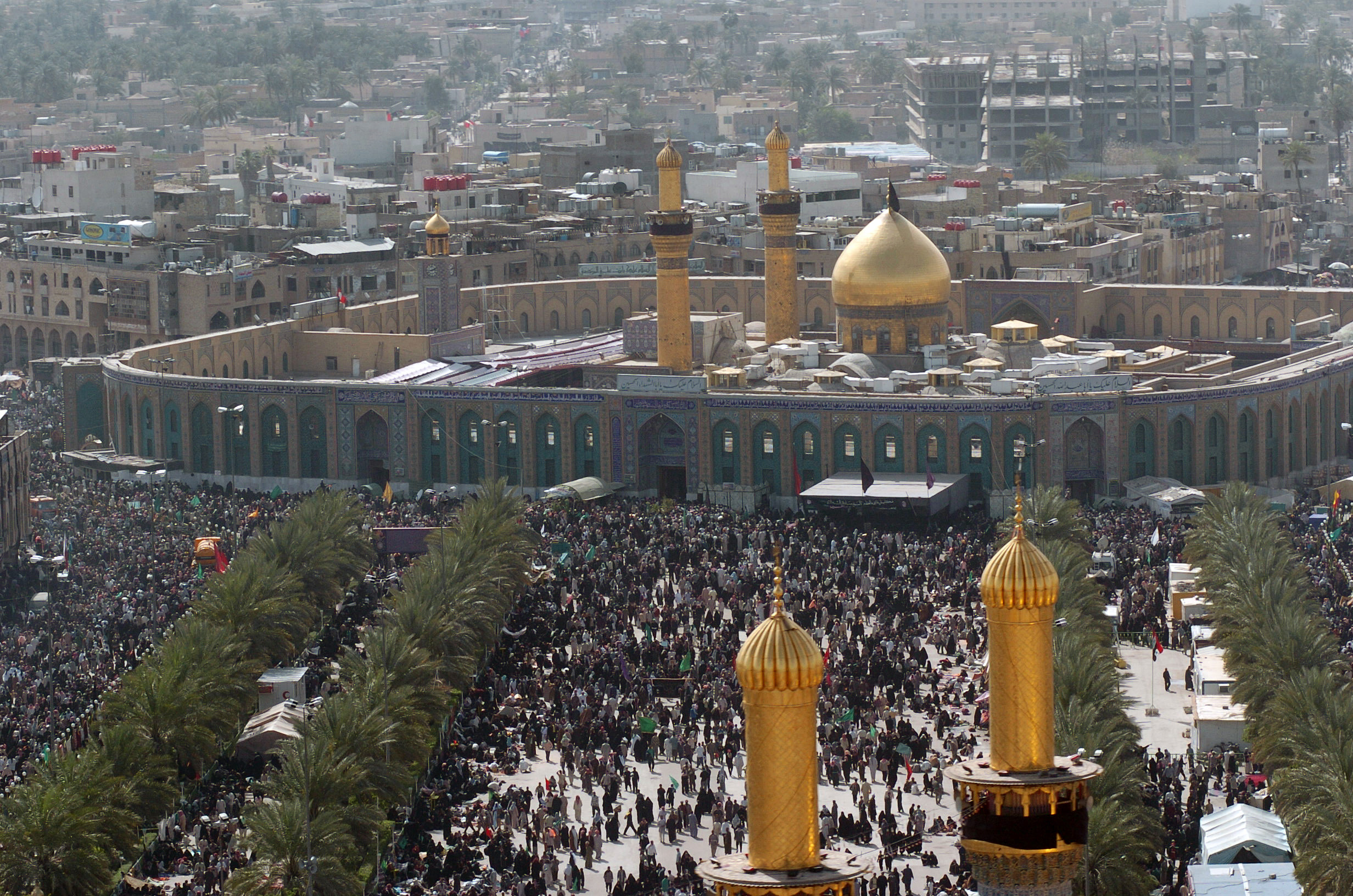
The Imam Husayn Shrine in Karbala, Iraq, where the Battle of Karbala took place.

In the period of Minor Occultation, theologians like Ibn Qube Razi, Newbakhtis, al-Shaykh al-Mufid, Seyyed Morteza and al-Shaykh al-Tusi rebuild the theological school of Imamiyah. In the second and third century of Hijra, a Ma'sum (infallible) and divinely chosen leader of the religion was more focused than the political role of the Imams by the theologians. Although Imamiyah believed that most of the works on the early Islamic centuries argue that Shi'ism began as a political movement rather than a religious group. However this does not mean that religious sentiments were absent in the first century. Dakake believes that the doctrine of Imamate was established in the time of Ja'far al-Sadiq, while Kohlberg states that the Twelver Shi'ism dates back not much before the beginning of the "Major_Occultation".

Muhammad is reported to have said that the Islamic leadership is in Quraysh (i.e., his tribe) and that 12 "Imams" shall succeed him. Sunni and Shiite sects differ as to whom Muhammad was referring. Muhammad stated (authenticated by Sunnis and Shiites), that "Whoever does not know the Imam of his Lifetime (Hadith of the Current Imam: i.e., recognizes same) has died the death of Ignorance". The idea of a prophet appointing a successor is found in the Old Testament where Joshua son of Nun is declared Moses’ successor or manager of his affairs after his death.

- Before conception, the preceding the Imam is sent through a heavenly syrup which he drinks.
- The Imam is born pure and circumcised. (93:5)
- The Imam's mother experiences light and noises before the birth of the Imam.

Shias believe that just as Moses appointed Aaron as his successor on Bani-Israel, (Hadith of position), in accordance with God's order, Muhammad, the final prophet, appointed Ali ibn Abi Talib to be the leader of the believers.

The Shi'a Twelver denomination of Islam consider it to be the highest level of responsibility given by God to a human.

== List of the Twelve Imams ==
Imams	Length of Imamate	Titles
Ali ibn Abi Talib	28 years (632–661)	Amir al-Mu'minin Wali Allah Bab-e-Madina tul Ilm Asadullah Abu Turab Al-Karrar Al-Murtadha As-Siddiq Al-Wasi Al-Faruq
Hasan ibn Ali	9 years (661–670)	Al-Mujtaba Al-Sibt Sayyid al-Shabab Ahl al-Jannah
Husayn ibn Ali	10 years (670–680)	At-Tayyib As-Sayyid Al-Sibt Al-Wafi Al-Mubarak
Ali ibn Husayn	22 years (680–712)	Al-Sajjad Zayn ul Abideen Sayyid al-Sajjadeen Dhu al-Thafenat
Muhammad ibn Ali	20 years (712–732)	Al-Baqir Al-baqara Al-Shakir
Jafar ibn Muhammad	33 years (732–765)	Al-Sadiq Al-Fadil At-Tahir
Musa ibn Jafar	34 years(765–799)	Al-Kazim al-Abd al-Salih Bab al-Hawa'ij Nafs Zakiyyah Ziynul Mujahidin Az-Zahid
Ali ibn Musa	19 years(799–818)	Al-Rida As-Sabir Ar-Razi Al-Wafi
Muhammad ibn Ali ibn Musa	19 years(819 –835)	Al-Jawad Al-Taqi
Ali ibn Muhammad	33 years(835–868)	Al-Hadi Al-Naqi al-Mutawakkil
Hasan ibn Ali ibn Muhammad	6 years(868–874)	Al-Askari Al-Samet Al-Zaki Al-Rafiq Al-Taqiy
Muhammad ibn Hasan	1151 years(874 - ongoing)	Al-Mahdi Al-Qa'im Al-Montazar Saheb al-Zaman Al-Gha'ib Al-Hojja Sahib al-Amr Sahib al-Haqq Baqiyat-Ullah

== See also ==
- Sayyid imam Muhammad al-Askari al-Baaj Saba' al-dujail
- Hadith of Mubahela
- Hadith of position
- Hadith of The Cloak - Hadith Al Kisa
- Hadith of the pond of Khumm
- Hadith of the Twelve Successors
- Islamic leadership
- Theology of Twelvers
- Signs of the reappearance of Muhammad al-Mahdi
- Reappearance of Muhammad al-Mahdi
