= Walayah =

Guardianship in Islam

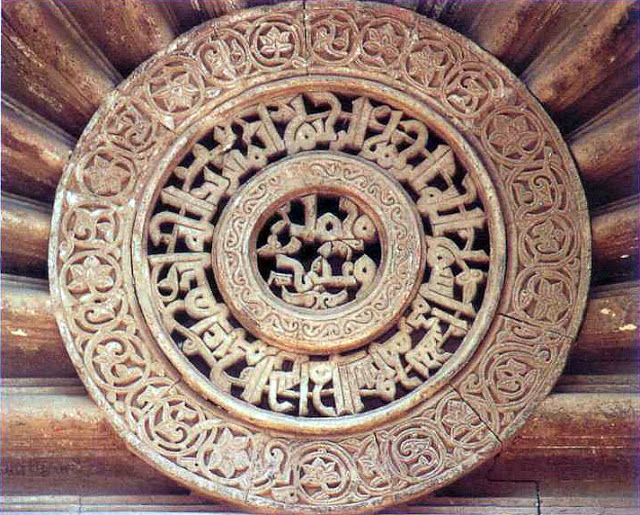
A Fatimid medallion depicting the Purity of Ahl al Bayt

Welayah or Walaya (Arabic: وَلاية, meaning "guardianship" or "governance") is a general concept of the Islamic faith and a key word in Shia Islam that refers, among other things, to the nature and function of the Imamate.

Welayah is something that can be granted to a person, community, or country that confers authority/guardianship to the wali (a person who has welayah) that they can exercise on behalf of someone else. For example, in fiqh, a father is wali of his children. The term wali holds a special importance in Islamic spiritual life and it is used with various meanings that relate to its different functions, including: Next of kin, Ally, Friend, Helper, Guardian, Patron, or Saint. In Islam, the phrase ولي الله walīyu l-Lāh can denote one vested with the "authority of God".

== Terminology ==
Two nouns are derived from the root W-L-Y ولي—walayah and wilayah—which means to be near to something, to be a friend of someone, or to have power. The term welayah is also related to the word awlia, a term for people who are "beloved of Allah." The term wali is derived the W-L-Y root based on the principles of Arabic morphology. Accordingly, walayah sometimes represent the sense of assistance, alliance or nusrah, while wilayah invariably denotes the idea of power, authority, or sultan.

Wali in the most literal form of the word means "a person, community, or country that is under the direction and rule of another." The word holds a special importance in Islamic spiritual life and it is used with various meanings, which relate to its different functions, which include: "next of kin, ally, friend, helper, guardian, patron, and saint." The eternal prophetic reality has two aspects: exoteric and esoteric.

In its connotation of sainthood, the word describes an innate sense of selflessness and separation from one's own wants in favor of awareness of being "under the dominion of the all-living, self-subsistent one and of the need to acquire nearness to the necessarily existent being – which is God."

== The concept of walayah ==
There are several kinds of walayah:

- Wila is love or nearness, suggesting love of the prophet and his close relatives.
- Awliya Allah translates to "friends of Allah" or the "beloved of Allah."
- Walaya is a key word in Shi‘ism that refers among other things to the nature and function of the Imamate.

According to Hamid Algar, the first definition of wali came from Abu’l-Qāsem Qošayrī (d. 467 Hijri/1074–1075 CE), who said that wali has two kinds of meanings: passive and active:

- Passive wali designates one whose affairs are completely guided by God.
- Active wali designates one who takes it on himself to worship God and obey him.

On the other hand, some mystics, such as Najm-al-dīn Dāya, define welayah according to the concept of love and friendship. Or, one can use the other meaning for wali, "closeness" as in "one who is close."

A wali is an elected man among believers because of his spiritual proximity to God. Walayah has a close relation to imamate; in other words there is inseparable linkage between imamiyyah (belief in the imamate) and walayah, which included five pillars such as love and devotion to the people of the household of the Prophet or Imams, following them in religion, being obedient to their commands, and abstaining from what they prohibited, imitating their actions and conduct, and recognizing of their rights and belief in their imamate.

In wila of leadership or authority over religious matters one requires Ismah. The leader's speech and actions are an example for others, as is seen in verses 33:21, 3:31 of the Qu'ran, and whatever he says is a divine proof. Imams or awliya all make up the long chain of the Friends of God who carry and transmit the divine covenant or welayah. According to an esoteric interpretation, during the World of the Pact ('âlam* al-mîthâq)—a world with the "pure beings" in the form of particles or shadows—one can see four oaths, including oaths of love and fidelity (walâya) toward Muhammad and his prophetic mission toward the Imams and their sacred cause, and toward the Mahdi as universal savior at the end of the world.

Mohammad Ali Amir-Moezzi believes that it is the very word welayah itself that denotes the ontological-theological status of the Imam. It is said that walâya has a quite simple translation along with two independent and complementary meanings. First, it applies to the imams of different prophets and also refers to their ontological status or their sacred initiatory mission. The second meaning is the "chief," the master of believers par excellence. In this interpretation, walî is a synonym of wasî, "the inheritor" or "the heir." According to second meaning, walaya applied to the faithful of the imams. It also denotes the unfailing love, faith, and submission that the initiated owe to their holy initiating guide. The Shia believe that every great prophet is accompanied by one or more imams in their mission.

=== Walayah of socio-political leadership ===
Spiritual walayah concerns changing people's ability to act and making the people approach divine nearness. The wali has a kind of creative power over the world and its inhabitants. Corbin states that walayah is the foundation of the prophecy and the mission of the messenger; it concerns the esoteric dimension of the prophetic reality. Abu al-Hasan Sharif Isfahani, a student of Muhammad Baqir Majlisi, by many hadith argues that "the walayah is the inner, esoteric meaning (batin) of the Qur'anic Revelation."

Mulla Sadra states that the genealogical descendants of Muhammad and his spiritual heirs are Awliya. Dakake describes walayah as a spiritual inheritance, an esoteric knowledge that imams inherit from the prophets, which expresses the spiritual and political authority of ahl al-Bayt. Tabatabaei regards walayah as the esoteric dimension of the immamate, which does not just guide man, but conveys man to the truth.

== Reasoning ==
=== By Quran ===
According to verse 42:23 and the hadith of Ghadir, the prophet called the Muslims to love his pure, sinless family. Al-Tabari, Az-Zamakhshari, and Fakhru'd-Din ar-Razi state that verse 5:55 was revealed about Ali. The verse implies that Allah and His prophet is the wali and hold authority over the Muslims, and the believers must accept their wila. This bond of love further requires that the Muslims follow their speeches, deeds, behaviors. In the Quran, the term walayah is used in conjunction with nusrah, and it is not only used in relation to God but also for those who have perfect devotion to God. The verse 7:172 deals with the primordial pact (mithaq) that God has taken for himself and the walayah to the prophet and the ahl al-Bayt. In the Quran, the term shows a link between faithfulness to God and devotion to the members of the community. Tabatabaei claims that, wherever the Quran ascribes the guardianship for the prophet, it means authority and devotion. Per verse 5:55, he claims that as the word walayah once is used for Allah and His messenger and those who have believed, though the believers are under His Guardianship, and ultimately he proves that the prophet's obedience is God's obedience.

=== By hadith ===
Ar-Razi quotes from az-Zamakhshari that the Prophet said:

Whosoever died in the love of the Household of Muhammad has died a martyr; Whosoever died in the love of the Household of Muhammad has died in forgiveness; Whosoever died in the love of the Household of Muhammad has died a believer and in the perfection of his faith. Whosoever dies in enmity to the family of Muhammad, dies a disbeliever. Whosoever dies in enmity of the family of Muhammad will not smell the scent of Paradise."

An al-Baqir hadith states that "Islam is built upon five [pillars]: prayer, alms-giving, fasting, pilgrimage, and walayah; and not one of them was proclaimed, the way walayah was proclaimed." Hasan ibn Ali states that, after professing tawhid and the mission of the prophets, nothing is more important than professing to the walayah of imams. Ja'far al-Sadiq said that imam separates the people of the heaven from the hell, without any judgement, because their love for the imam is their Heaven or Hell respectively. The prophet tells Ali that he heard Allah say to him: "I wrote thy name and his name on My Throne before creating the creatures because of my love of you both. Whoever loves you and takes you as friends numbers among those drawn-nigh to Me. Whoever rejects your walayah and separates himself from you numbers among the impious transgressors against Me." Al-Baqir states that "...There was never a prophet nor an angel who did not profess the religion of our love."

=== Theological and philosophical argument ===
In Shia tradition, walayah is not only one of the pillars of Islam; it is the religion itself. For Shia, the imamate is bound with the walayah. This entails believing their imamate and loving them, and following and obeying them in religion and in deeds. Shia argue that salvation comes though practice of walayah to the ahl al-Bayt, and an intention of love is required for the acceptance of every religious act. Many hadith from imams state that "the first thing about which a man is questioned after his death is his love for ahl al-Bayt. If he has professed this love (walayah) and died professing it, then his deeds are acceptable to Allah. If he has not professed this love, then none of his works will be capable of being accepted by Allah." Muhammad Baqir Majlisi states that all imams agree that deeds without love for imams are empty formality and Allah's approval is conditioned to imams. The ʾUlu al-ʿAzm got this title by accepting the walayah of the prophet, the imams, and the Mahdi. The prophet established the religion and imams to preserve Islam and to lead people by divine guidance (walayah), which imams inherited through the prophet. A hadith states, "He who knows himself knows his Lord," but without theophanic form (mazhar) and the Face of Allah, through whom Allah displays Himself, even to speak of Allah is impossible. Without the knowledge of Allah and divine revelation, man will be trapped in ta'til (agnosticism) and tashbih (anthropomorphism).

According to Shia belief, the end of prophecy was the beginning of walayah, which is prophecy's esoteric dimension and is complementary to it. Walayah embraces both the idea of knowledge (ma'rifah) and the idea of love (mahabbah). While prophecy is the exoteric (zahir) dimension of religion, walayah is its esoteric (batin) dimension; they are concurrent. Walayah is the esoteric dimension of Shariah, which renews man and religion spiritually in all times and purifies society without any need for a new religion. Wali carries the Muhammadan light that has existed in all the prophets. By this Muhammadan light, the imam leads society, propagates the religion, and guides spiritual life. Shi'ites believe that the cycle of prophecy is succeeded by the cycle of imamah, of which walayah is an essential component, for example, "the esoteric aspect of prophecy." The Friends of Allah (awliya' Allah) receive the divine secrets through the divine inspiration and. on this basis. God make them the human guides. The prophet reveals the shariah (zahir) and the imam brings the haqiqah (batin) of the religion, so the batin is not separate from the zahir.

Walayah is the foundation of the prophecy (nubuwah) and the messengership (risalah), which brings believers nearer to God. Because wali is concerned with guiding the community's spiritual life, the wali's presence in the community is not effective.

== History of the concept of Walayah ==
The concept of walayah is present at the early Shia history, which indicates the legitimacy of Alids and an allegiance to ahl al-Bayt. The term derives from a statement of the Prophet at Ghadir Khumm, in which he reportedly designated Ali as the mawla or wali of the believers.

During the Imamate of al-Baqir and al-Sadiq, the concept of walayah, as a prerequisite for membership in the Shia community, became a fundamental concept in the Shia discourse and was reinterpreted. Walayah implies a state of full devotion to ahl al-Bayt and a recognition of their exclusive right to legitimate leadership of the community. Shia Islam argues that perfecting the religion depends on practicing walayah. Walayah as one of the fundamentals of Islam, derived from Ghadir Khum traditions by al-Baqir, originates at this time and it is presented as the essence of the religion in this period. At the Time of al-Sadiq, the focus on the term walayah changed to imamah, linking the ideas of imamah and walayah. Later on, imam or imamate replaced the term walayah. By the First Civil War, the word is used along the word enmity (adawah, or Tabarra) reflecting loyalty to the Shia community (Tawalla).

For Sufism, there is a problem regarding the definition of wali and its attributes when wali is compared to the prophet. It seems that the notion of wali was superior to nabi early on, but scholars such as Abū Bakr Ḵarrāz (d. 286 hijri/899 CE) and, following him, Ḥakīm Termeḏī (d. between 295 hijri/907 CE and 310 hijri/922 CE) refuted this superiority. They believed that the prophethood has superiority over wali. However, they maintained that there are many different categories for welayah. Ḥakīm Termeḏī divided wali into two categories: welāya ʿāmma, which embraces all believers, and welāya ḵāṣṣa, which pertains exclusively to the spiritual elect.

Ibn Arabi also refers to a relation between nabi and wali. He believed that, although the prophet is indeed superior to wali, nabi is himself a wali besides being prophet. Ibn Arabi also mentioned that the wali-aspect of the nabi's being is superior to the nabi-dimension. Syed Ahmad Khan agreed with Ibn Arabi's view and explained it.

== Ismaili and Druze pillar ==
Walayah or walayat is a pillar of Shia Islam specifically in Isma'ilism and Druze denoting: "love and devotion for God, the Prophets, the Imam and the dai."

One should have walayat (guardianship of the faith) on the wali. If someone has been made wali, then they have full walayat (guardianship of faith) of them. Dawoodi Bohras believe walayah to be the most important of the seven pillars of Isma'ilism. It is the acceptance of guardianship of Allah, through His Da'i, Imam, Wasi (Wali), Ali and prophet Muhammad. To accept that Ali is wali of Allah is doing walayat of Ali. For Shia, walayat of Ali (and his further representatives) is a requirement.

There is a famous incident mentioned amongst the writings of Dawoodi Bohra that confirms how Ismaili interpret the principle of walayah. An order was issued by the 19th Da'i al-Mutlaq, Syedna Idris Imad al-Din, to his Wali al-Hind, Moulai Adam, to follow a person named Sakka. Moulai Adam, along with his followers, willingly performed prayer behind Sakka, who was a simple water carrier by trade. This showed that Adam had full walayah for his Da'i and had willingly accepted his guardianship and followed his order.

Qadi al-Nu'man, a famous Muslim jurist of the Fatimid period, identifies walaya, the concept that God's authority must always have a representative in creation, as the most important pillar of Islam, that "imbues all other pillars with meaning and efficacy." In his work The Foundation of Symbolic Interpretation (Asas al-Tawil) he talks about the history of walaya throughout the lives of the prophets and the succession of imams from the time of Adam to Muhammad.

Individuals that have attained this level are believed to be both favored and live in a state of nearness with God. The first step in sainthood is indicated in the Qur'an verse (2:257):

God is He Who loves, guards and directs those who believe; He has led them out of all kinds of darkness into the light, and keeps them firm therein.

and also in (10:62):

Know well that the confidants (saintly servants) of God—there will be no reason for them to fear (both in this world and the next, for they shall always find My help and support with them), nor shall they grieve.

One who has been favored with sainthood is called a wali or waliullah, meaning a saint. Waliullah may also be translated as a word used to describe a certain group of people selected by God from among millions of others to be "His friends" because of their closeness to God. Thus, a saint, or a friend to God, is thought to have favor in the eyes of the Lord.

For an individual to achieve walaya, or sainthood, a person must first become—and remain—a pristine example of a truly religious person, an example for all other Muslims to look up to. Upon these individuals, the peace and blessing of God have been placed. In the Qur'an, walaya is expressed in the Sura al-Kahf's fable of the rich but immoral owner of two gardens and his poor but pious companion. The rich man ends up a loser despite his prosperity and power, for ultimately, the walayah belongs to God (18:44).

== See also ==
- Islamic leadership
- Imamah (Shi'a doctrine)
- Imamah (Twelver Shi`i Doctrine)
- Imamah (Ismaili doctrine)
- Imamah (Nizari Ismaili doctrine)
- Tayyibi
