= Ancillaries of the Faith =

Religious practices advocated for by Shia Muslims

The Ancillaries of the Faith (Arabic: فروع الدين furūʿ ad-dīn), also known as the Ten Obligatory Acts, are the fundamental and obligatory practices of Twelver Shi'ism.

According to Twelver doctrine, what is referred to as pillars by Sunni Islam are called the practices or secondary principles or obligatory acts. After the pillars of Islam, the Ancillaries of the Faith include Jihad, Commanding what is just (Arabic: أمر بالمعروف), Forbidding what is evil (Arabic: النهي عن المنكر), Khums, a 20 percent annual tax paid on any profit earned by Shi’a Muslims; Tawalla, showing love to God and other good Muslims; Tabarra, disassociation from the enemies of God.

== Pillars of Islam ==
=== Salat (Prayer) ===
A Muslim must pray (Fardh/obligatory) five times a day. It is a physical, mental, and spiritual act of worship that is observed five times every day at prescribed times. When they do this, they must face Kaaba in Mecca. In this ritual, the worshiper starts standing, bows, prostrates themselves, and concludes while sitting on the ground. During each posture, the worshiper recites or reads certain verses, phrases and prayers. The word salah is commonly translated as "prayer" or "communication to Allah".

The prophet Muhammad described salat as the "centerpole" of the religion. The main meaning of salat in Arabic is to pray or bless. Salat has been classified into two basic kinds: required and recommended. The required salat is the second Pillar, while other salats are considered as recommended ones. The primary required salat is performed five times a day in the specified periods.

=== Sawm (Fast) ===
Fasting in Islam refers to completely refrain from food, drink, smoking, and sexual activity during the day from dawn to dusk.

It is required to fast during the month of Ramadan. All Muslims who are in the coming of age have to fast, although there are a number of exceptions to not fasting, such as illness and travel, pregnancy and menstruating. Missed fasting needs to be practiced in another time.

There are some verses as to fasting in Quran such as "The month of Ramadhan is that in which the Qur'an was revealed, a guidance to men and clear proofs of the guidance and the distinction; therefore, whoever of you is present in the month, he shall fast therein, and whoever is sick or upon a journey, then (he shall fast) a (like) number of other days; God desires ease for you, and does not desire for you difficulty, and (desires) that you should complete the number and that you should exalt the greatness of God for having guided you and that you may give thanks."

=== Hajj (Pilgrimage) ===
The Hajj is an annual Islamic pilgrimage to Mecca, Saudi Arabia, the holiest city for Muslims, and a mandatory religious duty for Muslims that must be carried out at least once in their lifetime by all adult Muslims who are physically and financially capable of undertaking the journey and can support their family during their absence. In Islamic terminology, Hajj is a pilgrimage made to Kaaba, the ‘House of God’, in the sacred city of Mecca in Saudi Arabia. The rites of Hajj begin on the eighth and ending on the thirteenth day of Dhu al-Hijjah, the last month of the Islamic calendar. Ihram is the name given to the special spiritual state in which pilgrims wear two white sheets of seamless cloth and abstain from certain actions.

The Hajj is associated with the life of Islamic prophet Muhammad from the 7th century, but the ritual of pilgrimage to Mecca is considered by Muslims to stretch back thousands of years to the time of Abraham. During Hajj, pilgrims join processions of hundreds of thousands of people, who simultaneously converge on Mecca for the week of the Hajj, and perform a series of rituals: Each person walks counter-clockwise seven times around the Kaaba (the cube-shaped building and the direction of prayer for the Muslims), runs back and forth between the hills of Safa and Marwah, drinks from the Zamzam Well, goes to the plains of Mount Arafat to stand in vigil, spends a night in the plain of Muzdalifah, and performs symbolic Stoning of the Devil by throwing stones at three pillars. After the sacrifice of their animal, the Pilgrims then are required to shave their head. Then they celebrate the three-day global festival of Eid al-Adha.

=== Zakah (Charity) ===
According to Chittick, The root of Zakat is purity means that people purify their property by paying a share of it to Allah. To be more precise, Zakat is defined as a determined percentage of one's acquired property or profit for the year that is paid to the needy who is described by Quran the poor, those who collect the zakat, those whose hearts are to be reconciled to Islam, captives, those in debt, those who are fighting for Allah, and travelers.

== Ancillaries ==
=== Khums ===
Khums, in the Ja'fari Shia tradition, is applied to the business profit, or surplus, of a business income. It is payable at the beginning of the financial year, though this is regarded as being the time at which the amount becomes clear. Ghanima and one-fifth tax of khums applies wherever gain or profit is involved. "Ghanima" has two meanings as mentioned above; the second meaning is illustrated by the common use of the Islamic banking term "al-ghunm bil-ghurm" meaning "gains accompany liability for loss or risk"

In 13th century Shia region, the khums was divided into two portions. One portion went to the descendants of Muhammad, the other portion was divided equally and one part given to Imam and clergy, while the other part went to the orphaned and poor Muslims. The famous view of contemporary Faqihs is that Imam's portion (during the Occultation (Islam)) is used in the fields that Marja' Taqlid has valid knowledge/doubt that if the infallible Imam would be apparent, he would use it in those ways, such as reinforcing Islam and Seminary, Islam promotion, building mosques in necessary situations, libraries and schools' affairs, handling old people, and actually all blessing affairs in the order of priority and their religious significance. Khums became a major source of income and financial independence of the clergy in Shia regions. This practice has continued among Shia Muslims.

=== Jihad (Struggle) ===
Jihad literally means Struggling. In an Islamic context, it can refer to almost any effort to make personal and social life conform with God's guidance, such as struggle against one's evil inclinations, proselytizing, or efforts toward the moral betterment of the ummah, though it is most frequently associated with war. In classical Islamic law, the term refers to armed struggle against unbelievers, while modernist Islamic scholars generally equate military jihad with defensive warfare.

=== Enjoining good and forbidding wrong ===
Enjoining what is right and forbidding what is wrong (Arabic: الأمر بالمَعْرُوف والنَهي عن المُنْكَر, romanized: al-amr bi-l-maʿrūf wa-n-nahy ʿani-l-munkar) are two important Islamic requisites from the Quran, "you enjoin what is right and forbid what is reprehensible", and are considered positive roles in helping others to take the straight path and abstain from reprehensible acts.

=== Tawalla ===
Expressing love towards the prophet and the house of Muhammad prophet means Tawalla and Tabarra is introduced as showing avoidance of the enemies of the house of the prophet. This rule are connected to social, military and political challenge. Based on these two principles, unity is establishing in society by following truth, justice, freedom, purity and the impure, oppressive, and the unjust ones are stopped.

=== Tabarra ===
To disapprove of the enemies of the Prophet Muhammad and the Ahl al-Bayt.

== See also ==
- Shi'a Islamic beliefs and practices
- Theology of Twelvers
- Bada'
