= List of people from Crete =

The following is a list of people from the island of Crete in southern Greece.

== Ancient ==
=== Mythology ===
See also Category:Cretan mythology and History of Crete

- Acacallis daughter of Minos.
- Aerope granddaughter of Minos.
- Androgeus son of Minos.
- Ariadne daughter of Minos.
- Asterion first king of Crete.
- Bianna immigrant to ancient Gaul.
- Catreus son of Minos.
- Deucalion son of Minos, father of Idomeneus.
- Dictys Cretensis legendary companion of Idomeneus, and the alleged author of a diary.
- Glaucus (son of Minos)
- Idomeneus son of Deucalion. He led the Cretan armies to the Trojan War in the side of Achaeans.
- Minos son of Asterion, king of Crete and judge in the Greek underworld.
- Rhadamanthus son of Asterion, king of Crete and judge in the Greek underworld.
- Zeus father of the gods of Olympus, god of the sky, thunder and lightning.

=== Dorian ===
==== Archaic era ====
- Thaletas early musician and lyric poet
- Epimenides (6th century BC) seer and philosopher-poet
- Chersiphron and Metagenes, father and son, architects, builders of the Temple of Artemis at Ephesus
- Aristocles, sculptor
- Dipoenus and Scyllis sculptors
- Hybrias lyric poet

==== Classical era (ca.500-335 BC) ====
- Ergoteles (5th century BC) Olympic runner of Knossos, migrant to Himera, Sicily.
- Kresilas (5th century BC) sculptor, famous for his "Pericles statue".
- Brotachus of Gortyna, mercenary mentioned in an epigram of Simonides.
- Sotades (early 4th century BC) Olympic runner. In his second Olympic victory, he ran for Ephesus.

==== In the army of Alexander the Great ====
- Eurybotas and Ombrion, generals of archers
- Nearchus admiral, geographer and explorer.
- Sibyrtius general and satrap of Arachosia and Gedrosia.

==== Hellenistic period (323 BC- 69 BC) ====
- Rhianus (3rd century BC), poet and scholar.
- Lagoras (3rd century BC) mercenary in the service of Ptolemy IV Philopator.

=== Roman period (69 BC-330) ===
- Aenesidemus 1st century BC, Skeptical philosopher.
- Lasthenes and Panares, generals who fought Metellus.
- Saint Titus (1st century) follower of Paul and first bishop of Crete.
- Lucillus of Tarrha writer.
- Mesomedes (2nd century) composer and lyric poet.
- Saint Philip (2nd century) bishop of Gortyna.
- Saint Pinytus (2nd century) bishop of Knossos.

== Byzantine period (330-824, 961-1204) ==
- Moses of Crete (5th century) Jewish Messiah claimant
- Saint Andrew (7th-century) bishop of Gortyna, theologian and hymnographer
- Saint Eumenes (7th century) bishop of Gortyna
- Saint Andrew (8th-century) martyr under Iconoclasm

== Venetian period (1204-1669) ==
- Pedro de Candia (1485–1542) mercenary and naturalized Spanish conquistador.
- Constantine Corniaktos (1517–1603) wine merchant and wealthiest man in the Eastern European city of Lviv.

=== Clerics ===
- Pope Alexander V (ca. 1339–1410) antipope during the Western Schism.
- Maximos Margunios (1549–1602) bishop of Cythera, scholar and philo-Latin theologian.
- Patriarch Cyril of Constantinople and Alexandria (1572–1638).

=== Artists ===
- Francisco Leontaritis (1518–1572) Renaissance composer, singer and hymnographer.
- Michael Damaskinos (1530/35-1592/9) icon painter
- Georgios Klontzas (1535-1608) icon painter
- Theophanes the Cretan (?-1559) icon painter
- El Greco (1541–1614) painter, icon painter, sculptor, and architect of the Spanish Renaissance.
- Theodore Poulakis (1622–1692) icon painter
- Emmanuel Tzanes (1637–1694) icon painter

=== Writers ===
- Stephanos Sahlikis (1330 - after 1391) Greek satyrical poet in Cretan verse.
- Francesco Barozzi (1537–1604) Italian mathematician, astronomer, translator and writer in Latin.
- Georgios Chortatzis (1545–1610) Greek dramatist in Cretan verse.
- Vitsentzos Kornaros (1553–1613/14) Greek romantic poet in Cretan verse.

=== Scholars ===
- John Rhosos (15th century) scribe, calligraphist and translator.
- Marcus Musurus (1470–1517) professor of Greek at the University of Padua, scholiast and epigrammatist.
- Nicholas Kalliakis (1645–1707) classical professor in universities of Italy.

== Ottoman period (1669-1898) ==
=== Christian ===
- Erasmus of Arcadia (18th century) Greek Orthodox bishop.
- Daskalogiannis (?–1771) rebel against Ottoman rule.
- Dimitrios Kallergis (1803–1867) statesman.
- Eleftherios Venizelos (1864–1936) politician, Prime Minister of Greece.
- Evangelos Sarris (1881–1917) army officer.
- Emmanouil Tsouderos (1882–1956) economist and politician.
- Nikos Kazantzakis (1885–1957) poet and author.

=== Muslim ===
See also Cretan Turks

- Ahmed Resmî Efendi (18th century) statesman, diplomat and author.
- Giritli Ali Aziz Efendi (18th century) Ottoman author, diplomat.
- Salacıoğlu (1750–1825) (18th century) Turkish folk literature poet.
- Giritli Sırrı Pasha (1844–1895) Ottoman author, statesman.
- Leyla Saz woman poet and composer.
- Rahmizâde Bahaeddin Bediz (1875–1951) the first Turkish professional photographer.
- Paul Mulla (1882–1959) (alias Mollazade Mehmed Ali) Roman Catholic bishop and author.
- Ali Fuat Cebesoy (1882–1968) Turkish statesman.
- Mustafa Ertuğrul (1892–1961) Turkish naval officer.

== Modern ==
Name	Born	Died	Age	Profession	Notes	Ref.
Alexis Minotis	1900	1990	90	Actor		
Sapfo Notara	c. 1907	1985	78	Actress		
[[ ]]						
[[ ]]						
[[ ]]						
[[ ]]						
[[ ]]						
[[ ]]						
[[ ]]						
[[ ]]						
[[ ]]						

- Manolis Hatzidakis (1909-1998) art historian and author.
- Manos Katrakis (1909–1984) actor.
- Odysseas Elitis (1911–1996) poet, Nobel laureate.
- Stylianos Pattakos (1912-2016) member of Greek military junta.
- Konstantinos Mitsotakis (1918-2017) politician, Prime Minister of Greece.
- Rena Kyriakou (1918–1994) pianist.
- Ilya Livykou (1919–2002) actress.
- George Psychoundakis (1920–2006) World War II resistance fighter, poet and translator.
- Thanasis Skordalos (1920–1998) Cretan folk singer and composer.
- Mikis Theodorakis (1925) musician.
- Kostas Mountakis (1926–1991) folk singer and composer.
- Terpsichori Chryssoulaki-Vlachou (1926–1944) member of the Greek resistance.
- John Aniston (1933) actor.
- Rika Diallina (1934) actress.
- Nana Mouskouri (1934) singer and politician.
- Rita Sakellariou (1934–1999) singer.
- Nikos Xilouris (1936–1980) composer and singer.
- Konstantinos Volanakis (1937) painter.
- Giannis Markopoulos (1939) composer.
- Manolis Mavrommatis (1941) sports journalist and politician.
- Psarantonis (1942) musician and singer.
- Christoforos Liontakis (1945) poet.
- Yannis Smaragdis (1946) film director.
- Maro Douka (1947) author.
- Giannis Dragasakis (1947) politician.
- Fotis Kafatos biologist
- Joseph Sifakis (1946) computer scientist, laureate of the 2007 Turing Award.
- Nikolaos Sifounakis (1949) politician.
- Mimis Androulakis (1951) author and politician.
- Maria Damanaki (1952) politician.
- Manolis Kefalogiannis (1959) politician.
- Kostas Hatzidakis (1965) politician.
- Nikos Machlas (1973) footballer.
- Georgios Samaras (1985) footballer.
