= Giulio Basetti-Sani =

Italian missionary and Islamicist (1912–2001)

The Reverend Giulio Basetti-Sani OFM
- Basetti-Sani in 1999
- Church: Catholic Church

Orders
- Ordination: 21 July 1935

Personal details
- Born: Francesco Basetti-Sani; 6 January 1912 Florence, Italy
- Died: 24 March 2001 (aged 88) Fiesole, Italy
- Education: Institut Catholique de Paris; Pontifical Oriental Institute; Dropsie College

Giulio Basetti-Sani OFM (6 January 1912 – 24 March 2001), born Francesco Silvestro Federigo Basetti-Sani, was an Italian Franciscan friar, missionary, and Islamicist. After his religious formation in Italy, he was sent to Egypt for a period of formation as a missionary. After returning to Europe for additional study, he was assigned to Egypt again to serve in various Franciscan missions. Basetti-Sani's commitment to ecumenism and interfaith dialogue with Muslims led to severe tension in his community, ultimately leading to his excommunication and expulsion from the Franciscans. The excommunication was later rescinded and he was readmitted to the order, teaching and writing extensively on Islam and Christianity until his death in 2001.

== Life ==
=== Early life ===
Basetti-Sani was born 6 January 1912 in Florence to an upper-class family, the fourth of five children. After a turbulent childhood witnessing the rise of fascism in Italy, he entered the Order of Friars Minor on 4 November 1926. On 10 January 1927 he was received into the novitiate and took the name Giulio after his formator Giulio Lorini, whom he admired, and his friend Giulio Bandini. As a novice, he discovered a lifelong interest in John Duns Scotus.

=== Religious formation and missionary work ===
On 21 July 1935, he was ordained to the priesthood and was then sent to Egypt for formation as a missionary. He was then sent to Paris, where he met Jean-Mohammed Abd-el-Jalil, a fellow Franciscan friar and a Moroccan convert from Islam, who introduced him to Louis Massignon, a Franciscan tertiary and Islamicist. At the Institut Catholique de Paris, Basetti-Sani studied under Jules Lebreton and Yves de Montcheuil. In this period he was also acquainted with Myrrha Lot-Borodine, Jacques Maritain and Dietrich von Hildebrand, and attended anti-Francoist meetings led by Maritain. It was through Massignon that Basetti-Sani was introduced to a positive view of Islam and Muhammad, in the spirit of Francis of Assisi. Basetti-Sani, once inspired by the anti-Muslim polemicist Ludovico Marracci discussed his opinion of Muhammad as a "prophet of Satan" with Massignon, who rejected this negative perception and exhorted him to deeper study of Islam.

Basetti-Sani was sent to Rome in 1938 for studies at the Pontifical Oriental Institute. There he studied Arabic and Coptic and was introduced to Islamic studies and spirituality by Paul Mulla, a Turkish Cretan priest who was also a convert from Islam. He participated in a Badaliya prayer group, a spiritual movement which promoted Christian prayer on behalf of Muslims. The local group was led by Mulla and attended by Giovanni Battista Montini. Here his theological interest in the role of Islam in salvation history developed, wondering why God allowed Islam to come into the world and claim to supersede Christianity. In Rome he also made the acquaintance of Alcide de Gasperi and aided a baptized Muslim engineer from Turkey in evading the Turkish authorities. After completing his licentiate, he returned to Egypt on an assignment to aid in the establishment of a Catholic seminary and learn the Coptic rite, as part of a project to inculturate the seminary. While living in Assiut, he was arrested by Egyptian authorities and spent the period from January 1941 to October 1943 in an internment camp. After this, he lived in house arrest at the Franciscan monastery in Al-Daher. His experience of captivity influenced his early negative view of Islam, which he later renounced under the influence of Louis Massignon. In 1947, he was named president of the Franciscan seminary in Egypt.

=== Excommunication and reconciliation ===
Basetti-Sani began to experience serious difficulties with his superiors. His facilitation of an ecumenical celebration of the feast of Pachomius the Great was condemned for being public prayer between "schismatics". His growing interest in Islamic spirituality and interreligious dialogue also led to tension in his community. Giovanni Battista Montini was sent to intervene. In May 1952 he was suspended from ministry in Egypt for his "grave doctrinal deviations" and returned to France to teach and do further theological study. He returned to Egypt in January 1955 and was assigned to a mission in Suez to assist Italian immigrants. He traveled with the Italian immigrants to Brazil and with the cooperation of Hélder Câmara assisted their integration into Brazilian society. He was offered a scholarship to the McGill University Institute of Islamic Studies to study with Wilfred Cantwell Smith, but was forbidden, as McGill was a Protestant university. He instead resided with the Franciscan community of Montreal, where he wrote Mohammed et Saint François. This publication led to Basetti-Sani's excommunication in 1959 on the charge of apostasy, on the grounds that it was a "defense of a false religion". He was then expelled from the Franciscan order and left homeless.

Basetti-Sani emigrated to New York in September 1959. Joseph Maria Pernicone, auxiliary bishop of the Archdiocese of New York, assisted him unsuccessfully in attempting to reconcile with the ecclesial hierarchy, which would not lift his excommunication nor restore his faculties. Basetti-Sani faced additional problems, being unable to secure permanent residence. As a result of this, in February 1960 he contracted a civil marriage to Dr. Ursula Ellermann, secretary of the department of religion at Columbia University to secure residence in the United States. He did this knowing it would further complicate his relationship with the ecclesial hierarchy, but believed he would eventually receive a sympathetic response. He then received a scholarship for doctoral studies at Dropsie College. This included a term of dissertation research and ecumenical studies at St Augustine's College. Basetti-Sani completed his dissertation in 1962. Basetti-Sani and Ellermann, who had been living as brother and sister since 1961, divorced in 1963. Bassetti-Sani then underwent rehabilitation with the Congregation of the Servants of the Paraclete in New Mexico. Under the authority of Alfredo Ottaviani, his excommunication was lifted and he was restored to being a priest in good standing. He went to Saint Paul University in Ottawa to teach for a year, and then returned to the United States for ten years at St. Bonaventure University. In 1973 he was readmitted to the Order of Friars Minor in the Holy Name Province of New York. From 1979 to 1983, he lived in the Philippines, teaching at the Franciscan seminary in Novaliches and University of Santo Tomas.

=== Later life and death ===
He returned to Florence in 1983, and from 1986 to 1994 he taught at the Instituto di Scienze Religiose di Trento. He then returned to the United States to serve in various visiting professorships, after some years of difficulties reconciling his irenic views of and writings about Islam with the anti-Islamic attitudes of his peers and superiors.

Basetti-Sani retired to Fiesole, where he died on 24 March 2001.

== Thought ==
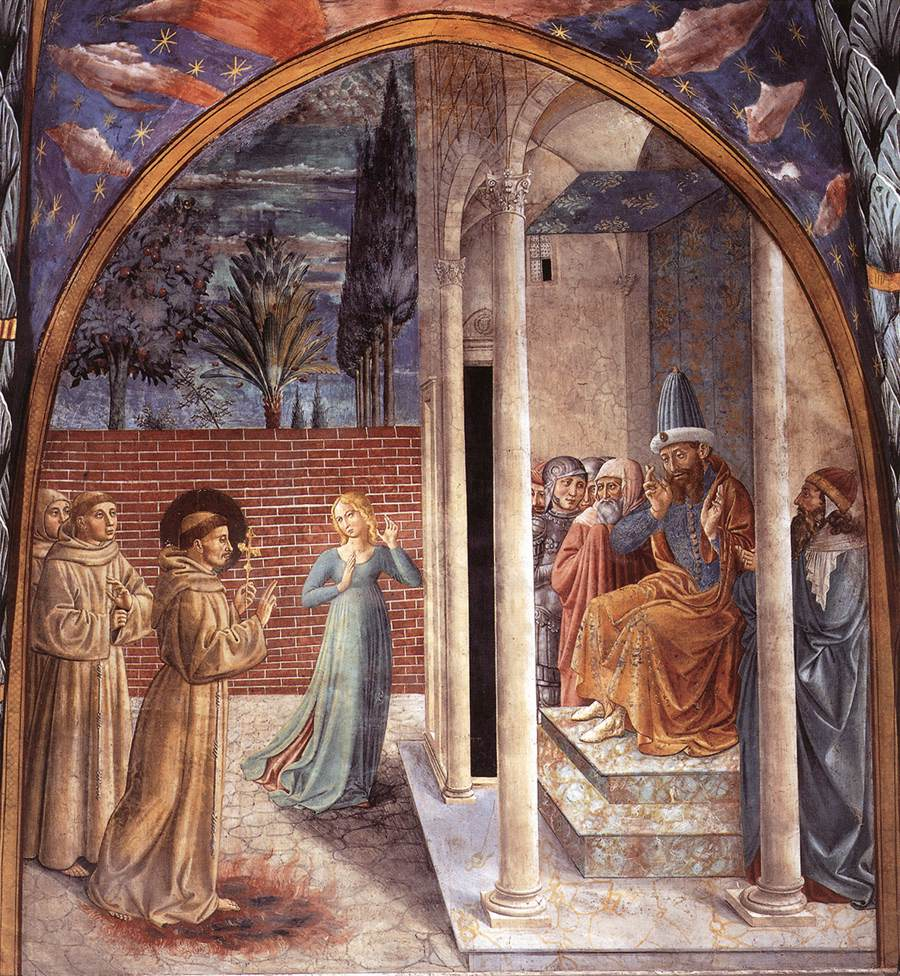
Francis of Assisi and Illuminatus of Arce with Sultan al-Kamil during the Fifth Crusade.

Basetti-Sani was a disciple of Louis Massignon, about whom he wrote a biography. As a theologian, Basetti-Sani is most notable for his claim that the Quran is an inspired scripture which, when read correctly, can be shown to be an authentic revelation of Christ, a hypothesis he develops in the book The Koran in the Light of Christ: A Christian Interpretation of the Sacred Book of Islam. This thesis has been accepted as a legitimate view within Catholic comparative theology, but has also been criticized for potentially being an obstacle to interreligious dialogue. Sidney H. Griffith identifies Basetti-Sani's work as an influence on Nostra Aetate.

John V. Tolan identifies Basetti-Sani as the most important influence on twentieth-century Franciscan repudiation of the Crusades and the reimagining of Francis of Assisi as a "counter-crusader" for his meeting with Sultan al-Kamil.

== Bibliography ==
- Antropologia teologica in Duns Scoto, Studi Medievali 34 (1993), pp. 139–91.
- Gesù Cristo nascosto nel Corano, Verona, Il Segno, 1994.
- Husayn Ibn Mansur al Hallaj martire mistoco dell'Islam, Verona, Il Segno, 1994.
- Il Corano nella luce di Cristo. Saggio per una reinterpretazione cristiana del libero Sacro dell'Islam, Bologna, EMI, 1971. (Published in English as The Koran in the Light of Christ).
- Il peccato di Iblis (Satana) e degli angeli nel Corano, Palermo, Iperbole, 1987.
- L'Islam e Francesco d'Assisi. La missione profetica per il dialogo, Florence, La Nuova Italia, 1975.
- L'Islam nel piano della salvezza, Florence, Edizioni cultura della pace, 1992.
- La Cristofania della Verna e le stimmate di san Francesco per il mondo musulmano, Verona, Il Segno, 1993.
- Liberalità e fecondità dell'amore nella meditazione trinitaria di Duns Scoto, in La vita spirituale nel pensiero di Giovanni Duns Scoto, Assisi, Santa Maria degli Angeli, 1966, pp. 158–201
- Louis Massignon (1883-1962), Florence, Alinea, 1985.
- Maria e Gesù figlio di Maria nel Corano, Palermo, ILA Palma, 1989.
- Mohammed et Saint François, Ottawa, Commissariat de Terre-Sainte, 1959.
- Muhammad, il Profeta, Rome, Jouvence, 2000.
- Per tre giorni a Trento incontro islamo-cristiano, "ITC INFORMA" year IV, March 1989.
- Per un dialogo cristiano musulmano. Muhammad, Damietta e la Verna, Milan, Vita e Pensiero, 1966.
- Musulmano e cristiano. L'"impossible" vicenda del francescano Giovanni-Maometto, Milan, Ancora, 1998.
- Dal Corano al Vangelo, Spino d'Adda, Grafica, 1991.
