= Pedro Descoqs =

- Born: January 2, 1877; Plomb, Normandy, France
- Died: November 8, 1946 (aged 69); Villefranche, Rhône, France

Philosophical work
- School: Neo-Scholasticism
- Institutions: Maison Saint-Louis, Jersey
- Notable students: Henri de Lubac, Gaston Fessard, Yves de Montcheuil
- Main interests: Metaphysics, political philosophy
- Notable works: À travers l’œuvre de Charles Maurras, Essai critique sur l'hylémorphisme

Pedro Descoqs SJ (French: [dɛkɔk]; 2 January 1877 – 8 November 1946) was a French Jesuit and Neo-Scholastic philosopher of the Suarezian school who taught at the Jesuit scholasticate Maison Saint-Louis in Jersey. Descoqs was a supporter of Action Française and opponent of the emergent nouvelle théologie, which brought him into conflict with prominent liberal Catholic intellectuals such as Maurice Blondel and fellow Jesuits, including his students Henri de Lubac, Yves de Montcheuil, and Gaston Fessard as well as Joseph Maréchal.

== Metaphysics ==
Descoqs defended the Neo-Scholastic position on nature and grace, defending a "direct natural vision of God" against the supernaturalism of Blondel and nouvelle théologie and opposed the use of Thomas Aquinas as a source for the nature-grace debate.

== Political philosophy ==
He is noted as the author of a synthesis of Le Dilemme de Marc Sangnier, a work of Charles Maurras. This work had immense repercussions in French Catholicism. For Descoqs, "friends and adversaries cannot avoid being struck by the power of his dialectic, the sharpness of his ideas, the accent of profound conviction, seeing the perfection of language which marks without any possible contest this new work of M. Maurras." À traverse l’œuvre de M. Maurras examines the principal strains of the thought of Charles Maurras and analyses their convergences and divergences with Descoqs's interpretation of Catholic doctrine.

== Reception ==
Henri de Lubac criticizes Descoqs at length in The Mystery of the Supernatural, arguing that he misrepresents the relationship between nature and grace and contributes to the misinterpretation of Thomas Aquinas in Neo-Scholasticism.

== Personal life ==
Descoqs was born in Plomb, Normandy and died of typhoid fever in Villefranche, Rhône.
