= Briffa =

Briffa is a surname. Notable people with the surname include:

- Emmanuel Briffa (1875–1955), Canadian theatre decorator
- Jimmy Briffa (born 1948), Maltese professional footballer and manager
- Keith Briffa (1952–2017), climatologist in the Climatic Research Unit at the University of East Anglia
- Louis Briffa (born 1971), Maltese poet
- Roderick Briffa (born 1981), Maltese professional footballer
- Rużar Briffa (1906–1963), Maltese poet, dermatologist, major figure in Maltese literature
- Tony Briffa (politician) (born 1971 Antoinette Briffa), Australian mayor, intersex activist and educator
- Tony Briffa (artist) (born 1959), Maltese artist

== See also ==
- Biffa
- Braffais
- Briffons
- Brouffia
