= Event of the mubahala =

Meeting between the Islamic prophet Muhammad and Najranite Christians

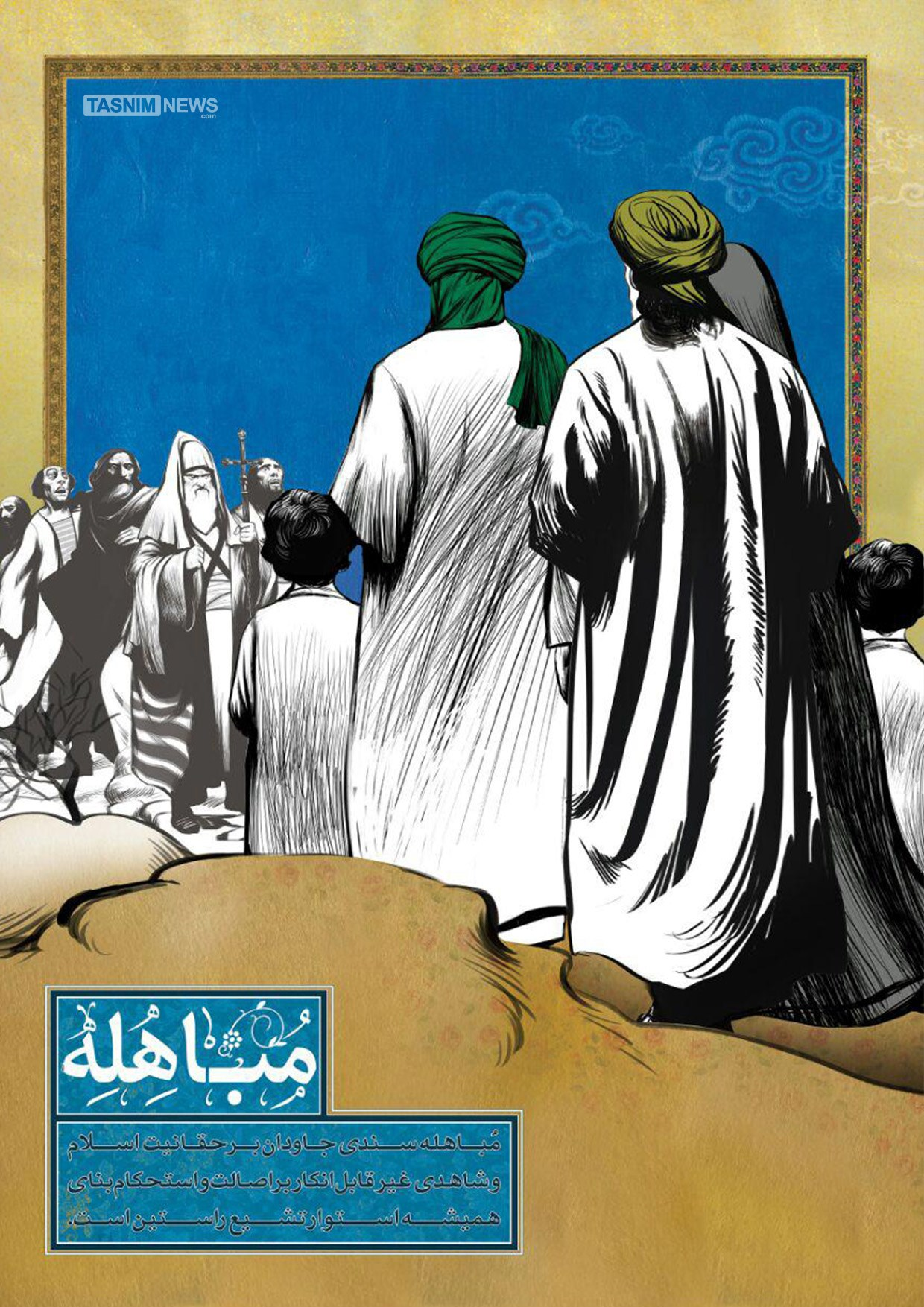
- Muhammad, Ali, Fatima, Hasan ibn Ali and Husayn ibn Ali, in an illustration from the Iranian Tasnim News Agency.
- Date: c. 9 AH / 631 CE
- Location: Medina, Hejaz, Arabian Peninsula
- Type: Religious encounter
- Participants: Muhammad and his family; a Christian delegation from Najran

The Event of the mubahala (Arabic: مُبَاهَلَة, romanized: mubāhala, lit. 'Mutual cursing') was a religious encounter between the Islamic prophet Muhammad and a delegation of Christians from Najran, which took place in Medina around 631 CE (9 AH). The event is associated with Quran 3:61, known as the Verse of Mubahala, which calls upon both sides to invoke God's curse upon those who are lying in a dispute over whether Jesus is divine or a human being. After discussions failed to resolve the dispute, Muhammad proposed that both sides invoke God's judgment through mubahala. The Christians declined to participate and instead agreed to a peace treaty with the Muslims.

The event of Mubahala is particularly important in Shia Islam because it is seen as evidence of the exceptional spiritual status of Ali, Fatima, Hasan, and Husayn. Muhammad brought them for the event, and they are therefore regarded as the people referred to as “our sons,” “our women,” and “ourselves” in Quran 3:61. Shia scholars particularly emphasize the inclusion of Ali under the expression “ourselves”, interpreting this as evidence of his unique closeness and spiritual position alongside Muhammad. The event is commemorated by Muslims, particularly Shia Muslims, on 24 Dhu al-Hijjah, known as the Day of Mubahala.

== Etymology ==
The word mubahala (مُبَاهَلَة) is derived from the Semitic root ب ه ل (B-H-L), meaning 'to curse', while the noun al-bahl can mean either 'the curse' or a scarcity of water. The word mubahala can also mean 'withdrawing mercy from one who lies or engages in falsehood'. The act of mubahala (lit. 'mutual imprecation, curse') thus involves swearing a conditional curse, for instance, "May I be cursed if...," together with a purifying oath. As a last resort, mubahala remains a lawful option to resolve disputes in Islamic jurisprudence (fiqh).

== Event ==
With the rise of Islam in the Hejaz, Muhammad wrote to nearby personages around the year 9 AH (631–632 CE) and invited them to Islam. One such letter was apparently addressed to the bishops of the Christian community of Najran. A delegation of Najrani Christians later arrived in Medina to meet with Muhammad in 8, 9, or 10 AH, perhaps to ascertain his claims to prophethood. In view of their weak ties with the Sasanian Empire, these and other Christians of the south were probably in a position to negotiate independently with Muhammad. By one account, the delegation was led by Abd al-Masih, Abu al-Harith ibn Alqama, and Sayyid ibn al-Harith. Thereby a peace treaty was reached by which the Christians agreed to pay an annual poll-tax (jizya) but were not required to convert to Islam or partake in the Muslim military campaigns, and remained in charge of their own affairs. This was perhaps the first such treaty in Muslim history, while also resembling the treatment of Christians elsewhere by Muhammad. It was not until the caliphate of Umar (r. 634–644) that the Christians of Najran were expelled from the Arabian Peninsula.

=== Mubahala ===
In Medina, Muhammad and the Christian delegation may have also debated the nature of Jesus, human or divine, although the delegation ultimately rejected the Islamic belief that Jesus was merely human, as represented by verse 3:59 of the Qur'an, which acknowledges the miraculous birth of Jesus but rejects the Christian belief in his divinity, "Truly the likeness of Jesus in the sight of God is that of Adam; He created him from dust, then said to him, 'Be!' and he was." Indeed, this and some other verses of the third chapter (surah), perhaps even its first seventy to eighty verses, are said to have been revealed to Muhammad on this occasion. Among these is verse 3:61, sometimes known as the verse of mubahala, which instructs Muhammad to challenge his opponents to mubahala, perhaps when the debate had reached a deadlock:

فَمَنْ حَآجَّكَ فِيهِ مِنۢ بَعْدِ مَا جَآءَكَ مِنَ ٱلْعِلْمِ فَقُلْ تَعَالَوْا۟ نَدْعُ أَبْنَآءَنَا وَأَبْنَآءَكُمْ وَنِسَآءَنَا وَنِسَآءَكُمْ وَأَنفُسَنَا وَأَنفُسَكُمْ ثُمَّ نَبْتَهِلْ فَنَجْعَل لَّعْنَتَ ٱللَّهِ عَلَى ٱلْكَـٰذِبِينَ
And to whomsoever disputes with thee over it, after the knowledge that has come unto thee, say, "Come! Let us call upon our sons and your sons, our women and your women, ourselves and yourselves. Then let us pray earnestly, so as to place the curse of God upon those who lie."

The following verse 3:63, "And if they turn away, then God knows well the workers of corruption," has been interpreted as the subsequent rejection by the Christian delegation of tawhid, that is, the Islamic belief in the oneness of God.

=== Participants ===
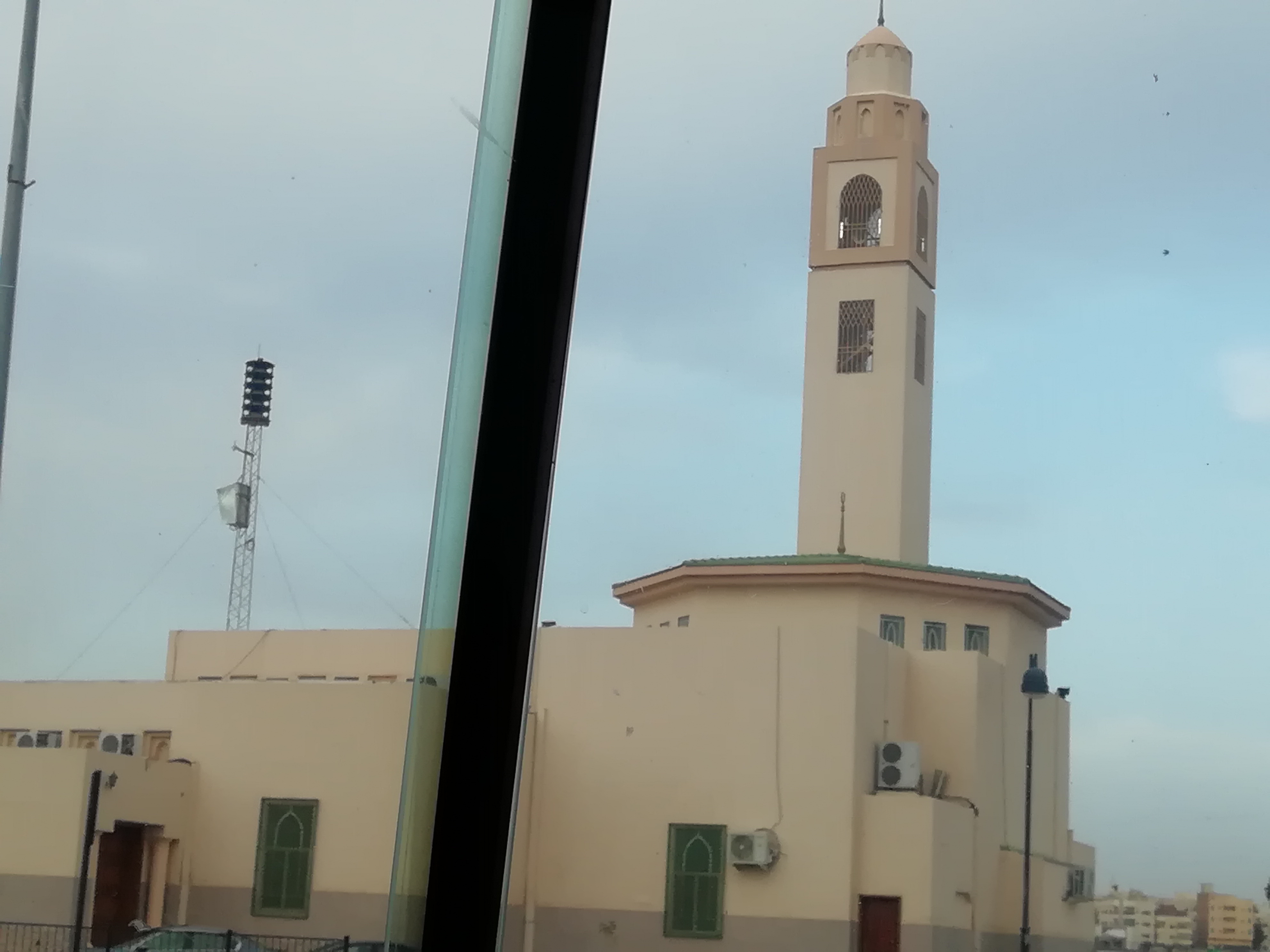
The Mubahala Mosque in Medina, present-day Saudi Arabia

According to some reports, the delegation did not accept the challenge and instead simply negotiated a peace treaty with Muhammad, either because they thought it possible that he was truthful in his claims, or because they were intimidated by the military might of the Muslims. This version of events is reported by the Sunni exegete Muqatil ibn Sulayman (d. 767), and the Sunni historian Ibn Sa'd (d. 845) in his Tabaqat. In a tradition cited by Muqatil, Muhammad reflects hypothetically that he would have taken with him to the mubahala his daughter Fatima, her husband Ali, and their two sons Hasan and Husayn. Ibn Sa'd writes that two leaders of the delegation later returned to Medina and converted to Islam, which might explain their earlier refusal of the mubahala.

Yet according to other accounts, Muhammad did appear for the occasion of mubahala, accompanied by his family, as instructed by the verse of mubahala, apparently at the khatib ahmar (lit. 'red dune') in the al-Baqi cemetery, later renamed to jabal al-mubahala (lit. 'mountain of the mubahala'). Those who accompanied him are often identified as Ali, Fatima, Hasan and Husayn. Such reports are given by the Shia-leaning historian Ibn Ishaq (d. 767) in his al-Sira al-Nabawiyya, the Sunni exegete Fakhr al-Din al-Razi (d. 1210) in his Tafsir, the Sunni traditionist Muslim ibn al-Hajjaj (d. 875) in his canonical Sahih Muslim, the Sunni traditionist Hakim al-Nishapuri (d. 1014) in his al-Mustadrak, and the prominent Sunni exegete Ibn Kathir (d. 1373). This indeed appears to be the majority view in exegetical works. Here, the Islamicist Wilferd Madelung argues that the term 'our sons' (abna'ana) in the verse of mubahala must refer to Muhammad's grandchildren, namely, Hasan and Husayn. In that case, he continues, it would be reasonable to also include in the event their parents, namely, Ali and Fatima.

==== Ahl al-Kisa ====
Some traditions about the mubahala add that Muhammad, Ali, Fatima, Hasan, and Husayn stood under Muhammad's cloak, and the five have thus become known as the ahl al-kisa (lit. 'people of the cloak'). On the same occasion, Muhammad may have defined his ahl al-bayt (lit. 'people of the house') as Ali, Fatima, Hasan, and Husayn, according to Shia and some Sunni sources, including the canonical collections Sahih Muslim, Sunan al-Tirmidhi, and Musnad Ahmad ibn Hanbal. Alternatively, some have suggested that these claims were possibly later additions. At any rate, the inclusion of these four by Muhammad, as his witnesses and guarantors in the mubahala ritual, must have raised their religious rank within the community.

== Significance in Shi'a Islam ==
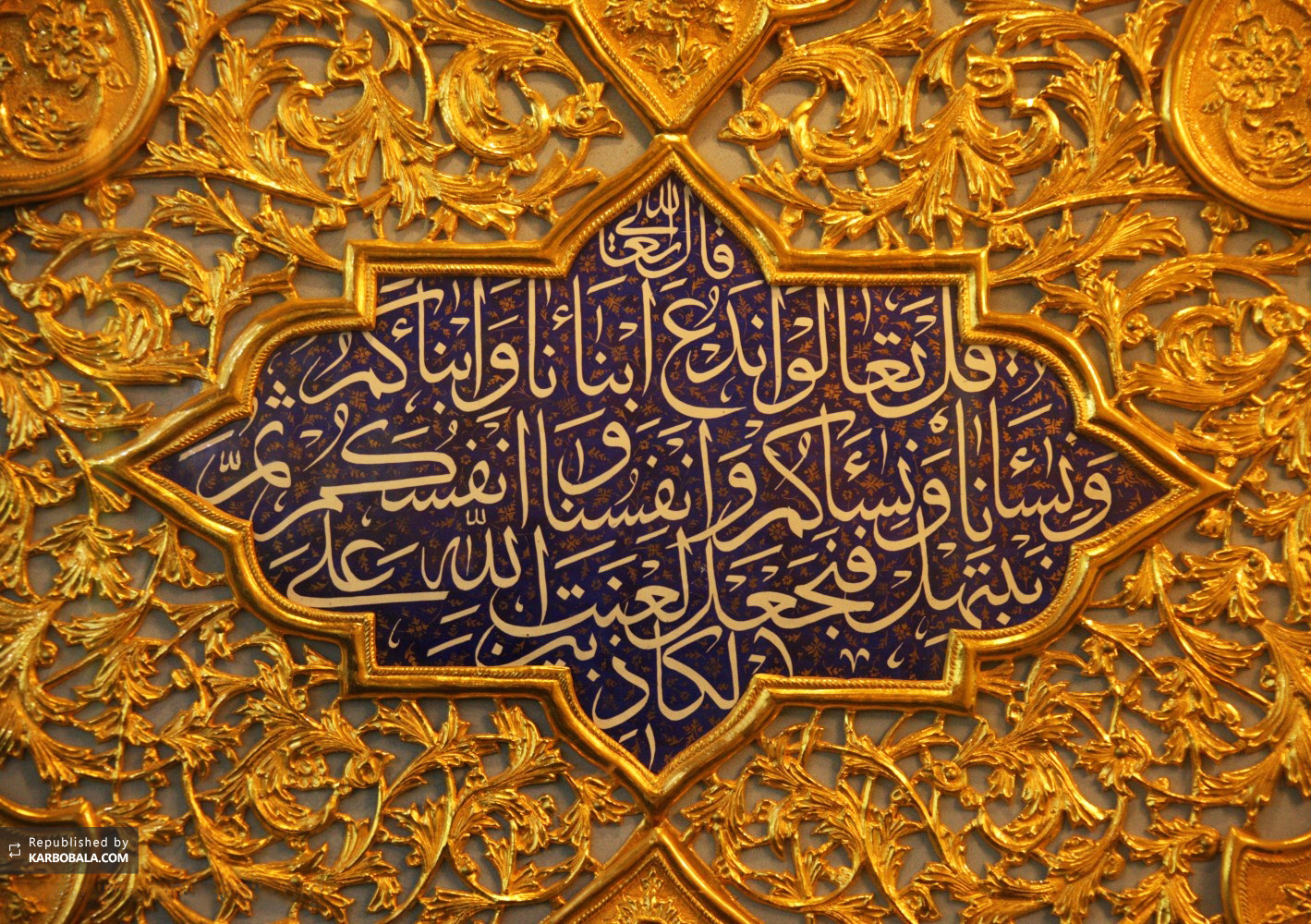
Verse 3:61 of the Quran, also known as the verse of mubahala, inscribed at the Imam Husayn Shrine in Karbala.

That Muhammad was accompanied to the mubahala by the above four is also the Shi'a view, and Shia sources are unanimous that the term 'our sons' (Arabic: أَبْنَآءَنَا, romanized: abna'ana) in the verse of mubahala refers to Hasan and Husayn, the term 'our women' (Arabic: نِسَآءَنَا, romanized: nisa'ana) therein refers to Fatima, and that the term 'ourselves' (Arabic: أَنفُسَنَا, romanized: anfusana) is a reference to Muhammad and 'Ali. By contrast, most reports presented by the Sunni exegete al-Tabari (d. 923) are silent about the matter, whereas some other Sunni authors agree with the Shia reports.

The verse of mubahala is often cited by Shi'a scholars to support their claims concerning the prerogatives of the ahl al-kisa. In particular, if the word 'ourselves' in the verse is a reference to 'Ali and Muhammad, as Shi'a authors argue, then the former naturally enjoys a similar authority as the latter. Likewise, the Shi'a exegete Muhammad Husayn Tabataba'i (d. 1981) contends that the participation of these four, to the exclusion of other Muslims, necessitates their partnership with Muhammad in his prophetic claims, for otherwise there could have been no negative consequence to their participation as the verse of mubahala targets only the liars.

=== Eid of the mubahala ===
Eid of the mubahala (عِيْد ٱلْمُبَاهَلَة) is the Shi'a commemoration of the prophet Muhammad's mubahala with the Christians of Najran, celebrated annually on 21, or 24 Dhu'l-Hijja of the Islamic calendar, although the date in the Gregorian calendar varies from year to year because the former calendar is lunar and the latter is solar. The equivalent Gregorian date to 24 Dhu'l-Hijja is shown below for a few years.

Islamic year	1443	1444	1445	1446	1447
Eid of mubahala	23 July 2022	12 July 2023	1 July 2024	20 June 2025	10 June 2026

== Christian interpretation of the mubahala ==
Giulio Basetti-Sani, a Franciscan Islamicist, argued that St. Francis's meeting with Sultan Malik al-Kamil was an act of reparation for the failure of the Christians of Najran to bear witness to Christ.
