= Cretan archers =

Historical class of warrior

Cretan archers were a well known class of warrior whose specialist skills were extensively utilized in both ancient and medieval warfare. They were especially valued in armies, such as those of the Greek city-states, (notably Athens, Sparta, Eretria, and Macedonia) and those of ancient Rome, which could not draw upon substantial numbers of skilled archers from their native populations.

== History ==
The use of bows and arrows by Cretan hunters is indicated as early as 2200 BC, in a Minoan seal. A mosaic discovered in Knossos and dated about 1700 BC portrays warriors armed with bows of both simple and double-convex designs.

During the classical Greek era Cretan archers carried composite bows, consisting of a wooden core with laminated layers of sinew and horn. These weapons, while difficult to string and use, gave the professional Cretan archers greater range than the simple wooden bows of the citizen levies of mainland Greece.

Though Cretan archers could be theoretically outranged by Rhodian slingers, they were widely recognized as being amongst the best light missile troops in the ancient world, and as such found employment as mercenaries in many armies, including Alexander the Great's and those of many of the Diadochi. During the Retreat of the Ten thousand following the Battle of Cunaxa in 401 BC Xenophon's hoplites were able to hold off pursuing Persian troops, with the aid of the Cretan archers who formed part of the Greek mercenary army. On this occasion the Cretans, cut off from supplies, were able to gather and reuse the spent Persian arrows while seizing bowstrings from local peasantry. Xenophon records that Cretan archers were outranged by their Persian counterparts and suffered losses because they wore no armour. Eurybotas was the toxarch (τοξάρχης), meaning captain of the archers, in the army of Alexander the Great.

Following the conquest of Macedonia and of the independent Greek city-states, Cretan archers served as auxiliaries in the Roman army as reformed by Gaius Marius under the Republic, and that of the Empire. Mediterranean light archers in Roman service from the 3rd through the 5th centuries A.D. might wear leather caps or be bare-headed. The chain-mail of earlier periods was replaced by leather jerkins or long-sleeved tunics, in favor of increased mobility and economy. Secondary weapons for use at close quarters included light axes and small round shields slung from a belt and suitable for parrying. An auxiliary unit of mounted Cretan archers: Cohors I Cretum Sagittariorum Equitata; fought in the Dacian Wars of 102–105 AD and continued to serve in that province until at least 161 AD.

Although the Roman archers of the late-Republican era had been mainly recruited from Crete, those of the Imperial Roman army were increasingly drawn from more thickly populated provinces such as Syria, Anatolia and Thrace. By the middle of the 2nd century AD 32, auxiliary units designated as sagittarii (archers) had Syrian titles and only one Cretan.

Crete remained part of the Byzantine Empire until seized by Venice in the aftermath of the Fourth Crusade. During much of this period the island was a theme (military province), providing both archers and sailors for the Byzantine forces.

In 1452, Venice granted specific permission for Byzantium to resume recruitment of Cretans. One of the last occasions on which Cretan archers are known to have played a significant role was as part of the garrison defending Constantinople against the Turkish army of Mehmet II in May 1453.

== Defensive armour and equipment ==
Normally Greek archers fought unarmored, yet some sources show archers wearing Linothorax or leather armor (like on the Nereid Monument), helmets, or even a cuirass. Ancient Cretan archers were said to also wear small shields, which implies, that they were capable of defending themselves in close combat. This also implies that they were probably also equipped with swords. Due to the mass of Cretan archers in use during the Hellenistic era it is possible, that at least in some cases, "Cretan" means "in the Cretan fashion", like "Tarantine" in Tarantine cavalry often denotes a type of tactics and equipment, rather than actual cavalry from Tarantas. At least some other Hellenes tried to imitate Cretan archers, as some sources talk about archers "armed in the Cretan style".

== In popular culture ==
Cretan archers are included in the video games Rome: Total War, Total War: Rome II & Total War: Arena, where they are available to be hired as mercenaries.
