= Paul Mulla =

Turkish priest and scholar (1882–1959)

Monsignor Paul Mulla
- Native name: Ali Mehmet Mulla Zade
- Church: Catholic Church
- Archdiocese: Aix-en-Provence

Orders
- Ordination: 29 June 1911 by Edwin Bonnefoy

Personal details
- Born: September 6, 1883 Kandiye, Ottoman Crete
- Died: March 3, 1959 (aged 75) Rome, Italy
- Buried: Campo Verano
- Occupation: Islamicist
- Education: University of Aix-en-Provence

Paul Ali Mehmet Mulla Zade (6 September 1882 – 3 March 1959) was a Turkish-French Catholic priest, Islamicist and convert from Islam. He was the godson of Maurice Blondel and served as a professor of Islamic studies in Rome.

== Life ==
=== Early life ===
Ali Mehmet Mulla Zade was born in Kandiye on 6 September 1881. He was the eldest son of Pertev Ibrahim Mulla Zade, a doctor and journalist. He was raised bilingual in Turkish and Greek, and became fluent in Arabic, Persian, and French at school. By the year 1895, he had already published Turkish poetry in a journal published in İzmir. In 1895, he was sent to high school in Bouches-du-Rhône. After graduating, he enrolled in the University of Aix-Marseille where he studied under Maurice Blondel.

He was descended of a clerical family from Konya who migrated to Crete after the surrender of the Venetians to the Ottomans in 1669.

=== Conversion to Christianity ===
In 1904, Mulla experienced a personal crisis brought on by the death of his twenty-two year old sister Fetine and subsequently failing his doctoral exams in law. During this period, he received the hospitality of his teacher Maurice Blondel, whom he then asked to be his godfather. Blondel accepted without hesitation and Mulla was baptized Paul Marie-Joseph on 25 January 1905 at the chapel of the major seminary of Aix-en-Provence. His godmother, Félicie Boissard, was a labor organizer. During this period of conversion, he was influenced by his study of John Henry Newman, Blaise Pascal, Augustine of Hippo, and Maine de Biran. Mulla's conversion alienated him from his father, who during a visit by Mulla to Crete shortly after his baptism made remarks about killing him.

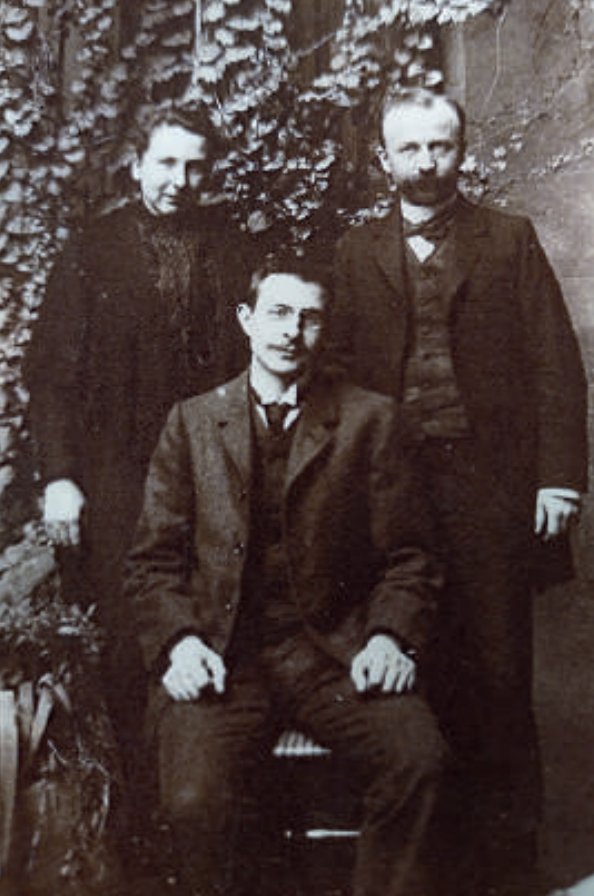
Mulla with godparents on the day of his baptism.

In a 1945 interview with Eugenio Pellegrino, he recounted his conversion to Christianity. He described a process of having been "shook inside" by an "experience of the natural irreparability of sin and the natural incurability of a sinner." In his conversion from Islam, he experienced a need in order "to recognize the God-man" to "discard the Islamic image of Christ", which he described as having "vaporous features" and an "unreal Passion". This was accompanied by a rejection of a "rationalist prejudice" which "gratuitously rejects, a priori" the possibility of God entering human history. He found belief in the Trinity credible due to a perception of "coherence and unity" among the "divine processions" and described being moved by the Christian belief in divine providence.

In a 1947 autobiographical letter, Mulla describes exploring the various religious and political movements of turn-of-the-century France, including student organizations promoting laicism and anticlericalism, organizations promoting monarchism and integral nationalism, Protestant churches as well as the social Catholicism of Marc Sangnier and Le Sillon. According to Mulla, studying with Maurice Blondel and reading Blondel's dissertation clarified his understanding of modern philosophy. He stated that his decision to convert came after four years of study and personal experience under Blondel's care.

=== Ordination to the priesthood ===
After returning to France from Crete, Mulla began seminary studies in Miramas for the Archdiocese of Aix. He was ordained to the priesthood on 29 June 1911 by Edwin Bonnefoy. His first assignment was as a parochial vicar in Fuveau. Mulla remained a Turkish subject at this time, but pursued French citizenship after Ahmet Rıza warned him that people would not understand his way of life and that there would be no place for him in a liberal Turkey. He obtained French citizenship on 3 March 1913, having been at risk of statelessness due to the First Balkan War.

Mulla was then assigned as a parochial vicar at Église Saint-Jean-de-Malte. During the First World War, he was conscripted and served in military hospitals as a nurse in Aix. In 1917, he was promoted to sub-lieutenant and assigned to Beirut where he served as an interpreter for French troops in the Levant. In Beirut, he met Louis Massignon and Eugène Tisserant. During this period, Mulla began to discern his future in the priesthood. Three possibilities set before him were serving Propaganda Fide, further study in Paris, or joining the Jesuits in the Middle East. Due to a papal decree requiring priests in military service to return to their home dioceses, he served as a professor of philosophy at the diocesan college of Aix from 1919 to 1924.

=== Later life ===
With the assistance of Maurice Blondel recommending him to Michel d'Herbigny, Mulla was hired in 1924 as a professor at the recently established Pontifical Oriental Institute, where he taught the university's first course in Islamic studies.

From 1924 until his death in 1959, Mulla taught coursework in all areas of Islamic studies. In 1928, Mulla was named a Prelate of Honour of His Holiness by Pope Pius XI and mentioned indirectly in a papal encyclical:

As to the education of the students, besides the dogmatic theology of the dissidents, the explanation of the Oriental Fathers, and of all that appertains to Oriental studies, whether of history, liturgy, archaeology, or other sacred branches of learning, and the languages of various nations, we recall with special gratification how We have been enabled to add to the Byzantine Institutions a chair of Islamic Institutions, a thing hitherto unheard of in Roman centers of learning. By a special favor of Divine Providence, We have been able to place at the head of this Department a man who, born a Turk, and after many years of study, having by God’s help professed the Catholic religion and been ordained to the priesthood, seemed capable of teaching those among his compatriots who were to be destined to the sacred ministry how to present, as well to scholars as to the ignorant, the cause of the One Individual God, and of the Gospel law.

— Pope Pius XI, Rerum Orientalium

In 1927, Mulla began a lifelong correspondence with Jean-Mohammed Abd-el-Jalil, a Moroccan student who was baptized in France and became a Franciscan priest. Henri de Lubac described the relationship between Mulla and Abd-el-Jalil as a "quasi-filiation."

He maintained also from 1924 until his death correspondence with Louis Massignon. He was a friend of Giovanni Battista Montini, who participated in a Badaliya prayer group Mulla led in Rome.

Notable students of Mulla included Ignatius Antony II Hayyek, Eugene Bossilkov, Paul II Cheikho, Ignace Abdo Khalifé, Giuseppe Mojoli, Giulio Basetti-Sani, Yves de Montcheuil, and René Voillaume.

=== Death ===
Mulla died suddenly in Rome on 3 March 1959 at the beginning of a celebration of Mass. He is buried in Campo Verano alongside two Papal Zouaves.

== Bibliography ==
- "Doit-on admettre le vote obligatoire?", Provence Universitaire, April 1902, p. 70.
- "De la logique des institutions. Esquisse d'une histoire naturelle de la loi", Paul Pourcel 1903.
- "Sur la manie dogmatique", Provence Universitaire, July 1913, p. 111-113.
- "La Turquie Nouvelle", Le Petit Éclaireur des Alpes et de Provence, September 1908.
- "Les Jeunes Turcs", L'Éveil démocratique, August 1909.
- "La Question crétoise", Le Petit Éclaireur des Alpes et de Provence, September 1909.
- "Semaines et Semaniers", in Le Faisceau, August 1909.
- "Impressions d'un Jeune Turc à la Semaine Sociale [de Saint-Étienne]", in Le Petit Démocrate, August 1911.
- "La conversion du monde musulman", Toulouse, Editions de l'Apostolat de la Prière, 1923, p. 12.
- "À propos de l'Apologie contre Renan de Nâmiq Kémal", Orientalia Christiana 16 (1929), n. 55, рр. 47-53.
- "Élites des peuples islamisés et des nations européennes modernes", August 1930.
- "Le devoir des nations européennes et de leurs classes élevées envers les peuples de l'Islam", February 1930.
- "Popoli islamici e nazioni europee: La via dell'intervento europeo" in L'Osservatore Romano, 21 February 1931, p. 3.
- "La sagesse coranique d'après un livre récent", in Orientalia Christiana Periodica 2 (1936), pp. 254–260.
- "Perspectives d'après-guerre en pays de mission et conditions d'une évangélisation libre et efficace", in Studia Missionalia 1 (1943) pp. 137–165.
- "Hürriyet", in Le Flambeau, Istanbul, 1949.
