= Le Parc, Manche =

Le Parc
- Commune
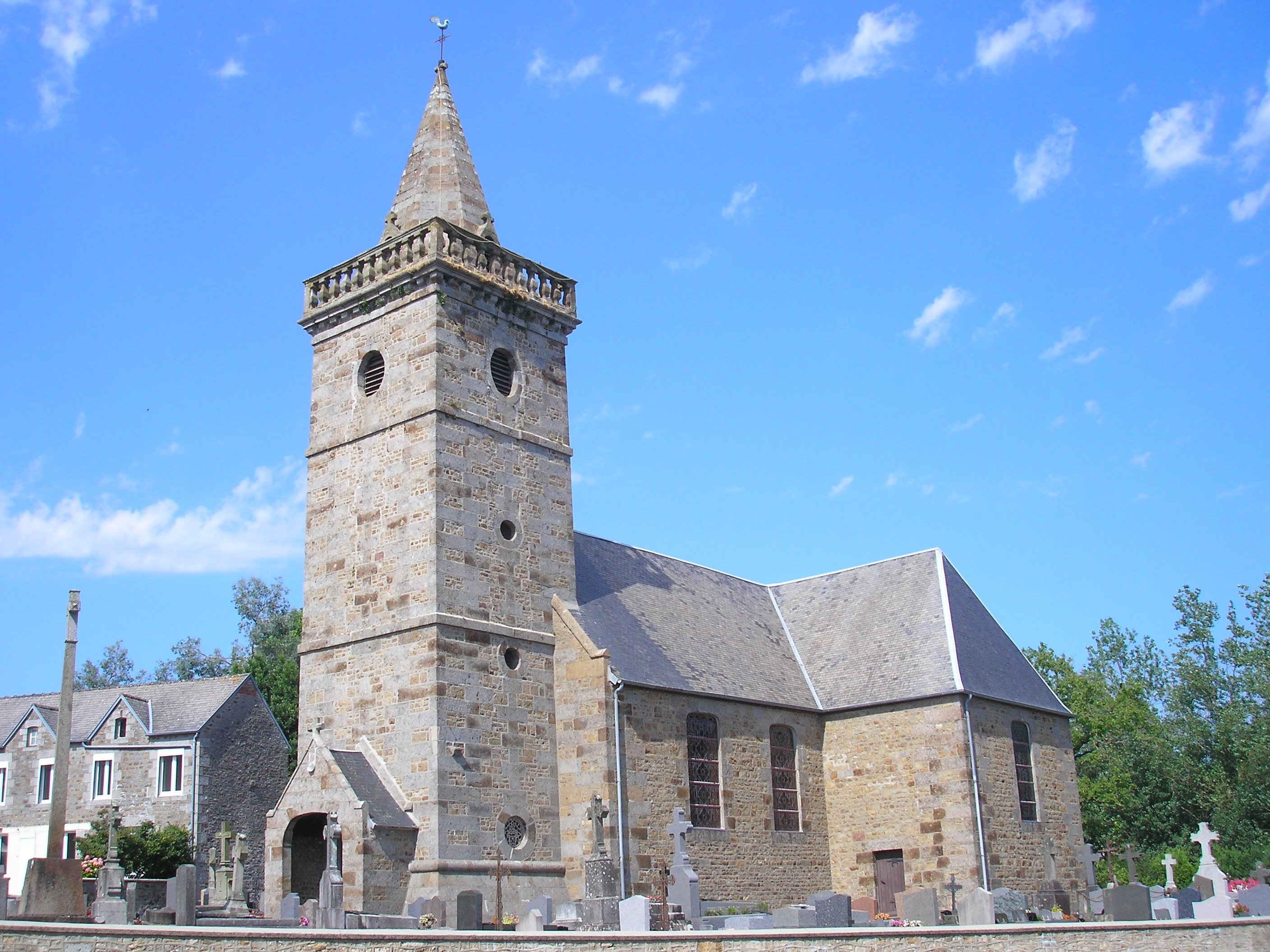
- The church in Sainte-Pience
- Location of Le Parc
- Location within France Location within Normandy
- Coordinates: 48°45′47″N 1°18′07″W
- Country: France
- Region: Normandy
- Department: Manche
- Arrondissement: Avranches
- Canton: Avranches
- Intercommunality: CA Mont-Saint-Michel-Normandie

Government
  - Mayor (2020–2026): Marc Leneveu
- Area^{1}: 22.63 km^{2} (8.74 sq mi)
- Population (2023): 921
  - Density: 40.7/km^{2} (105/sq mi)
- Time zone: UTC+01:00 (CET)
  - Summer (DST): UTC+02:00 (CEST)
- INSEE/Postal code: 50535 /50870
- ^{1} French Land Register data, which excludes lakes, ponds, glaciers > 1 km^{2} (0.386 sq mi or 247 acres) and river estuaries.

Le Parc (French pronunciation: [lə paʁk]) is a commune in the department of Manche, northwestern France. It was established on 1 January 2016 by merger of the former communes of Braffais, Plomb and Sainte-Pience (the seat).

== See also ==
- Communes of the Manche department
