= Passport (Nana Mouskouri album) =

Compilation album by Nana Mouskouri
- Released: 1976
- Label: Philips
- Producers: André Chapelle; Snuff Garrett; Roger Cook; Roger Greenaway

Passport is a compilation album by Greek singer Nana Mouskouri, released in 1976 by Philips Records. Containing 21 tracks, it is Mouskouri's highest-charting album in the United Kingdom, where it reached number three in the UK Albums Chart and was certified Gold by the BPI. The album was initially released on LP, cassette and 8-track cartridge formats before later being released on CD.

== Critical reception ==
Professional ratings
Review scores
Source	Rating
AllMusic	2.5/5 stars

Stewart Mason of AllMusic wrote that that the album's appeal depends on the listener's tolerance for Eurovision-style easy pop, noting that the singer was among the best in this genre in the 1960s and 1970s. Despite some overly lush arrangements, he praised her voice and musical judgment, highlighting "The Loving Song" and "Four and Twenty Hours" as standout tracks.

== Track listing ==
Side one

No.	Title	Writer(s)	Length
1.	"The White Rose of Athens"	Manos Hatzidakis; Hans Bradtke; Norman Newell; Archie Bleyer	2:37
2.	"I Have a Dream"	Michel Fugain; Pierre Delanoë; Georges Blaness; Herbert Kretzmer	3:37
3.	"Day Is Done"	Peter Yarrow	3:38
4.	"Never on Sunday"	Hatzidakis; Billy Towne	3:08
5.	"My Friend the Sea"	Delanoë; Georges Petsilas; Hal Shaper	3:14
6.	"Plaisir d'amour"	Jean-Pierre Claris de Florian; Jean-Paul-Égide Martini	3:21
7.	"The Loving Song"	Lee Pockriss; Elaine Laron	2:36
8.	"Try to Remember"	Harvey Schmidt; Tom Jones	3:12
9.	"Turn On the Sun"	Mitch Murray; Peter Callander	2:50
10.	"Odos Oniron"	Hatzidakis	2:54
11.	"Milisse Mou"	Hatzidakis; Nikos Gatsos	2:50

Side two

No.	Title	Writer(s)	Length
1.	"Enas Mythos"	Hatzidakis; Thrasyvoulos Stavrou	4:16
2.	"Bridge over Troubled Water"	Paul Simon	4:15
3.	"And I Love You So"	Don McLean	4:00
4.	"If You Love Me"	Marguerite Monnot; Édith Piaf; Geoffrey Parsons	3:30
5.	"Seasons in the Sun"	Jacques Brel; Rod McKuen	4:00
6.	"The Last Rose of Summer"	Thomas Moore; Georges Newton (arr.)	3:21
7.	"Over and Over"	Petsilas; Michel Jourdan; David Fennell; Paul Chapman	3:00
8.	"Four and Twenty Hours"	Franco Reitano; Mino Reitano; Vito Pallavicini; Roger Cook; Roger Greenaway	3:37
9.	"Cu-Cu-Rru-Cu-Cu Paloma"	Tomás Méndez	4:04
10.	"Amazing Grace"	John Newton	3:10

== Charts ==
Chart performance for Passport
Chart (1976)	Peak position
Dutch Albums (Album Top 100)	9
UK Albums (Official Charts)	3

== Certifications ==
Region	Certification	Certified units/sales
United Kingdom (BPI)	Gold	100,000^{^}
^{^} Shipments figures based on certification alone.
