= Nana Mouskouri =

Greek singer

Nana Mouskouri OQ
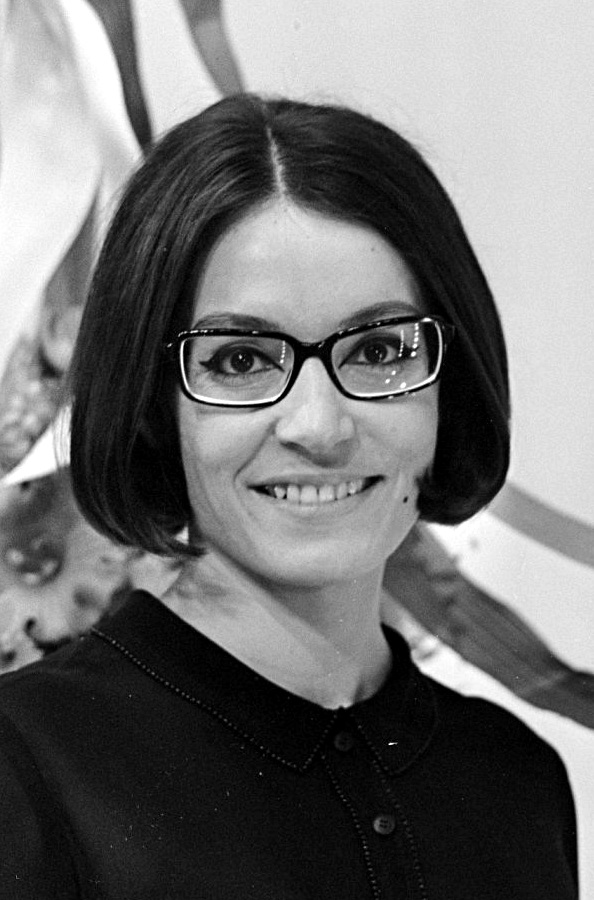
- Mouskouri in 1966

Background information
- Born: Ιωάννα Μούσχουρη (Ioánna Moúschouri); 13 October 1934 (age 92); Chania, Crete, Greece
- Genres: Jazz; pop; easy listening; folk; Greek folk; world music
- Occupation: Singer
- Instrument: Vocals
- Years active: 1958–2008; 2011–present
- Labels: Fontana; Polydor; Mercury; Verve; Philips; PolyGram; Universal Music France
- Website: Universal Music France, Official site
Nana Mouskouri
Member of the European Parliament for Greece
- In office 1994–1999
Personal details
- Party: New Democracy

Ioanna "Nana" Mouskouri OQ (Greek: Ιωάννα "Νάνα" Μούσχουρη [i.oˈana ˈnana ˈmusxuri]; born 13 October 1934) is a Greek singer and politician. Over the span of her career, she has released an estimated 450 albums in at least thirteen languages, including Greek, French, English, German, Dutch, Portuguese, Italian, Japanese, Spanish, Hebrew, Welsh, Mandarin Chinese and Corsican.

Mouskouri became well known throughout Europe for the song "The White Rose of Athens", recorded first in German as "Weiße Rosen aus Athen" as an adaptation of her Greek song "Σαν σφυρίξεις τρείς φορές" (San sfyríxeis tris forés, "When you whistle three times"). It became her first record to sell over one million copies. Later, in 1963, she represented Luxembourg at the Eurovision Song Contest with the song "À force de prier", finishing eighth. Her friendship with the composer Michel Legrand led to the recording by Mouskouri of the theme song of the Oscar-nominated film The Umbrellas of Cherbourg. From 1968 to 1976, she hosted her own TV show produced by BBC, Presenting Nana Mouskouri. Her popularity as a multilingual television personality and distinctive image, owing to the then unusual signature black-rimmed glasses, turned Mouskouri into an international star.

"Je chante avec toi Liberté", recorded in 1981, is perhaps her biggest hit, performed in at least five languages – French, English as "Song for Liberty", German as "Lied der Freiheit", Spanish as "Libertad" and Portuguese as "Liberdade". "Only Love", a song recorded in 1984 as the theme song of TV series Mistral's Daughter, gained worldwide popularity along with its other versions in French (as "L'Amour en Héritage"), Italian (as "Come un'eredità"), Spanish (as "La dicha del amor"), and German (as "Aber die Liebe bleibt"). It became her only UK hit single when it reached number two in February 1986.

Mouskouri became a spokesperson for UNICEF in 1993. She was elected to the European Parliament as a Greek deputy from 1994 to 1999. In 2006, she was a special guest on Eurovision Song Contest 2006's final, presented as the best selling artist of all time. In 2015, she was awarded the Echo Music Prize for Outstanding Achievement by the German music association Deutsche Phono-Akademie. At the French 41st Victoires de la Musique ceremony held on 13 February 2026 in Paris, Mouskouri was honored with the special "Honorary Victory" (Victoire d'honneur).

== Early years ==
Nana Mouskouri was born on 13 October 1934 in Chania, Crete, where her father, Constantinos, worked as a film projectionist in a local cinema; her mother, Aliki, worked in the same cinema as an usher. When Mouskouri was three, her family moved to Athens.

Mouskouri's family sent her and her older sister Eugenía (Jenny) to the Athens Conservatoire. Although Mouskouri had displayed exceptional musical talent from age six, Jenny initially appeared to be the more gifted sibling. Financially unable to support both girls' studies, the parents asked their tutor which one should continue. The tutor conceded that Jenny had the better voice, but Nana was the one with the true inner need to sing. Mouskouri has said that a medical examination revealed she has only one functioning vocal cord and this could well account for her remarkable singing voice (in her younger years ranging from a husky, dark alto, which she later dropped, to a ringing coloratura mezzo), as opposed to her breathy, raspy speaking voice.

Mouskouri's early childhood was marked by the German Nazi occupation of Greece. Her father became part of the anti-Nazi resistance movement in Athens. Mouskouri began singing lessons at age 12. As a child, she listened to radio broadcasts of singers including Frank Sinatra, Ella Fitzgerald, Judy Garland, Charles Trenet, Billie Holiday, and Édith Piaf.

In 1950, she was accepted at the Conservatoire. She studied classical music with an emphasis on singing opera. After eight years at the Conservatoire, Mouskouri was encouraged by her friends to experiment with jazz music. She began singing with her friends' jazz group at night. However, when Mouskouri's Conservatory professor found out about Mouskouri's involvement with a genre of music that was not in keeping with her classical studies, he prevented her from sitting for her end-of-year exams.

During an episode of Joanna Lumley's Greek Odyssey, shown on the UK ITV channel in the autumn of 2011, Mouskouri told the actress Joanna Lumley how she had been scheduled to sing at the amphitheatre at Epidauros with other students of the Conservatoire, when upon arrival at the amphitheatre word came through from the Conservatoire in Athens that she had just been barred from participating in the performance there owing to her involvement in light music. Mouskouri subsequently left the Conservatoire and began performing at the Tzaki club in Athens.

She began singing jazz in nightclubs with a bias towards Ella Fitzgerald's repertoire. In 1957, she recorded her first song, "Fascination", in both Greek and English for Odeon/EMI Greece. By 1958 while still performing at the Tzaki, she met Greek composer Manos Hadjidakis. Hadjidakis was impressed by Nana's voice and offered to write songs for her. In 1959 Mouskouri performed Hadjidakis' "Κάπου υπάρχει η αγάπη μου" (Kápou ipárchi i agápi mou, "Somewhere my love exists"; co-written with poet Nikos Gatsos) at the inaugural Greek Song Festival. The song won first prize, and Mouskouri began to be noticed.

At the 1960 Greek Song Festival, she performed two more Hadjidakis compositions, "Τιμωρία" (Timōría, "Punishment") and "Κυπαρισσάκι" (Kyparissáki, "Little cypress"). Both these songs tied for first prize. Mouskouri performed Kostas Yannidis' composition, "Ξύπνα αγάπη μου" (Xýpna agápi mou, "Wake up, my love"), at the Mediterranean Song Festival, held in Barcelona that year. The song won first prize, and she went on to sign a recording contract with Paris-based Philips-Fontana.

In 1961, Mouskouri performed the soundtrack of a German documentary about Greece. This resulted in the German-language single "Weiße Rosen aus Athen" ("White Roses of Athens"). The song was originally adapted by Hadjidakis from a folk melody. It became a success, selling over a million copies in Germany. The song was later translated into several languages and it went on to become one of Mouskouri's signature tunes.

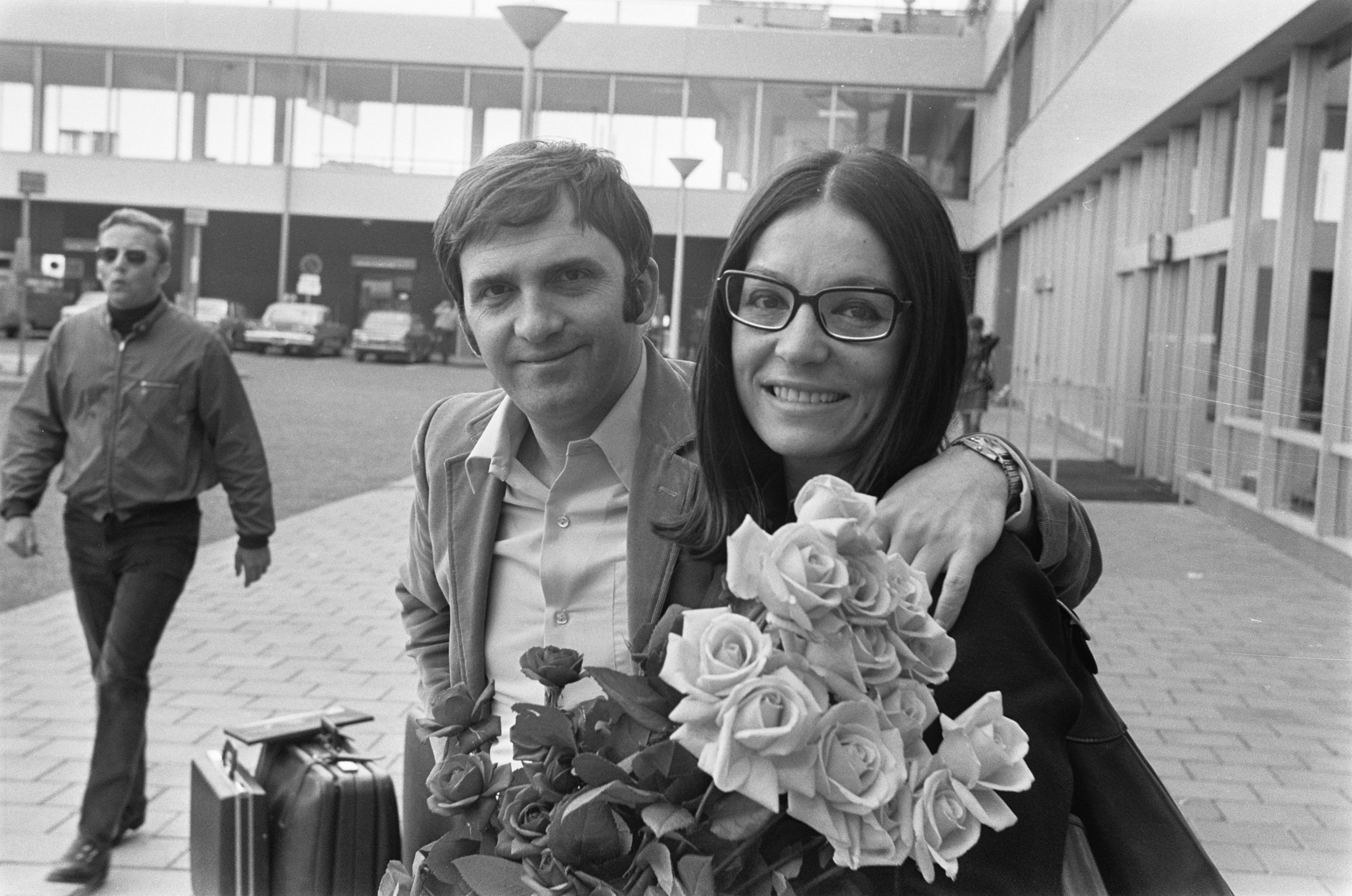
Nana Mouskouri with her first husband Georges Petsilas in the Netherlands in 1971

== Personal life ==
Mouskouri has been married twice: first at age 25, to Yorgos (George) Petsilas, a guitarist in her backing band (the trio "The Athenians"). They had two children (Nicolas Petsilas in 1968 and Hélène (Lénou) Petsilas in 1970); the couple divorced in 1973. Shortly afterward, she began a relationship with her record producer André Chapelle; However, they did not marry at that time because she 'didn't want to bring another man into the family', and divorce went against her conservative upbringing. They eventually married on January 13, 2003, and live primarily in Switzerland.

== Life outside Greece ==
In 1960, Mouskouri moved to Paris.

In 1962, she met Quincy Jones, who persuaded her to travel to New York City to record an album of American jazz titled The Girl from Greece Sings. Following that she scored another hit in the United Kingdom with the song "My Colouring Book" (later included in her 1973 album Songs from her TV series).

She performed Luxembourg's entry in the Eurovision Song Contest 1963, "À force de prier". Although the song achieved only eighth place in the contest, in a field of sixteen, it achieved commercial success, and helped win her the prestigious Grand Prix du Disque in France. Mouskouri soon attracted the attention of French composer Michel Legrand, who composed two songs which became major French hits for her: "Les Parapluies de Cherbourg" (1964) and an arrangement of Katherine K. Davis's "Carol of the Drum", "L'Enfant au Tambour" (1965).

In 1965, she recorded her second English-language album to be released in the United States, entitled Nana Sings. American singer Harry Belafonte heard and liked the album. Belafonte brought Mouskouri on tour with him through 1966. That year, they collaborated on an album entitled An Evening With Belafonte/Mouskouri released by RCA Victor. On the album's cover photo, Mouskouri is noticeably not wearing her signature black-rimmed glasses; during the tour, Belafonte suggested that Mouskouri remove her glasses while on stage. She was so unhappy with the request that she wanted to quit the show after only a few days. Finally, Belafonte relented and respected her wish to perform while wearing her glasses.

On September 15, 1965, Mouskouri appeared for the first time on American television with Harry Belafonte on the Danny Kaye Show. While on the show Mouskouri performed "Telalima" followed by "Σήκω χόρεψε κουκλί μου" (Siko horepse koukli mou) accompanied by Harry Belafonte and Danny Kaye.

Mouskouri's 1967 French album Le jour où la colombe raised her to super-stardom in France. This album featured many of her French songs, "Au cœur de septembre", "Adieu Angélina", "Robe bleue, robe blanche" and the French pop classic "Le Temps des cerises". Mouskouri made her first appearance at Paris' legendary Olympia concert theatre the same year, singing French pop, Greek folk, and Hadjidakis numbers.

=== BBC-TV series ===
These successes across Europe and elsewhere impressed Yvonne Littlewood, the BBC producer who had first met Mouskouri at the 1963 Eurovision Song Contest in London. Following several successful guest appearances on British TV after her Eurovision performance, the BBC invited Mouskouri and her backing group, The Athenians, to start hosting a TV series called Presenting Nana Mouskouri from 1968 onwards. A typical episode of her series contained contemporary British, American and French pop and folk music, popular classical pieces, and the Greek songs which had originally made her famous. The shows also featured European and world music stars of the time as guests, making it one of the first BBC TV series to do so regularly. Despite the fact that stars from mainland Europe singing in languages other than English have tended to find it difficult to break into the British market, Mouskouri's series proved very popular with viewers of the new BBC-2 channel, and it ran until 1976. As well as performing songs known to British viewers, Mouskouri welcomed the television audience, chatted to her guest stars and gave spoken introductions to her French and Greek songs in fluent English. These introductions, along with a modest stage presence and her bespectacled appearance, made her a very distinctive star, as Yvonne Littlewood later explained:

I suppose it was unusual to see a singer wearing glasses. She didn't look like everyone else. She didn't have blonde hair, and she was very distinctive in her appearance. […] You know, we should remember that, in those days, we didn't have all the holiday programmes, so Greek music and anything Greek wasn’t as well known to the average public as it is now. […] She would give the gist [in English] of the subject of the song before she sang it, and that was really quite unique and quite charming.

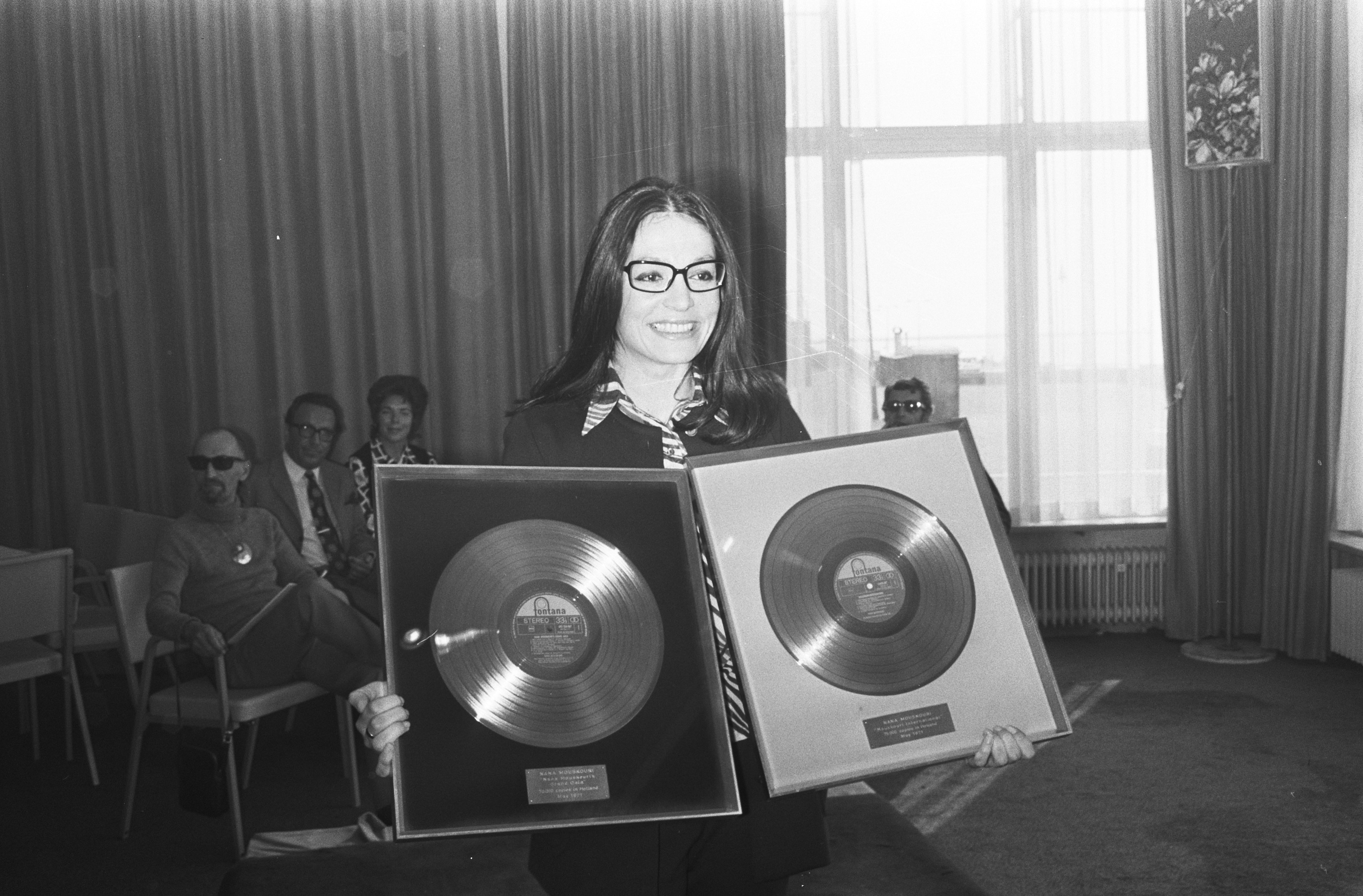
Nana Mouskouri receiving a gold and a platinum disc for record sales in Netherlands (1971)

Mouskouri's international appeal encouraged the BBC to sell her programmes to television stations across the world, a fact which she acknowledged in a BBC interview in 2014:

For about 10 years, I was doing every year the series on BBC2… and they went everywhere… in Asia… of course in the Commonwealth… but even in South America… so that I think that I owe to the BBC a lot. And to Yvonne Littlewood, really.

Mouskouri also hosted her own shows for French and West German broadcasters during this period. At a time when TV programmes could attract huge audiences, her popularity as a multilingual television personality turned her into a truly international star.

Although music series such as hers started to become less common on British TV as the 1970s wore on, the BBC continued to engage Mouskouri regularly for one-off television specials and guest appearances on other programmes until the mid-1980s, by which time she had been a regular contributor to British TV for more than 20 years.

=== Success as an album artist ===
In 1969, Mouskouri released her first British LP, Over and over, which reached number 10 and spent a total of 102 weeks in the UK album charts. This began a series of albums for the UK market which, boosted by her TV appearances, sold extremely well during the early 1970s, including The exquisite Nana Mouskouri (1969), Turn on the sun (1970), A place in my heart (1971) and Presenting Nana Mouskouri - Songs from her TV series (1973), while concerts from two of her British tours were also recorded and released as LPs: British Concert (1972) and Live at the Albert Hall (1974).

During the 1970s, Mouskouri - always a prolific recording artist - had two hit LPs in West Germany: Sieben schwarze Rosen (1975) and Lieder, die die Liebe schreibt (1978). Spiti mou, spitaki mou (1972) returned Mouskouri to prominence in Greece, and she continued to release a series of top-selling records in France, including Comme un soleil (1971), Une voix qui vient du cœur (1972), Vieilles chansons de France (1973), and Quand tu chantes (1976). Meanwhile, Passport, a compilation including her most popular songs in English, reached number 3 in the UK album charts in 1976 and won for her a gold disc.

In August 1974, while in Australia, Mouskouri was presented with a plaque representing the sale of twenty Gold Records.

As her fame began spreading outside her fan base in Europe, the United States, and the Commonwealth, Mouskouri was asked to record songs for the Japanese and Taiwanese markets. In 1976, a renowned Taiwanese author, Echo, heard her music and introduced it to one of her female radio DJ friends. Mouskouri's records then became popular in Taiwan, especially among high school and college students, with one of her British albums, Nana's book of songs (1974) becoming particularly popular.

== Middle years ==
In 1979, Mouskouri released another English-language album named Roses and Sunshine. This album consisted largely of folk and country material, and included work from sources including Neil Young, Dolly Parton, Bob Dylan and John Denver. It was well received in Canada, and one of the album's tracks, "Even Now" (not the same song as the 1978 Barry Manilow hit), became a staple on beautiful music radio stations in the United States. She scored a worldwide hit in 1981 with "Je chante avec toi Liberté", which was translated into several languages after its success in France. The momentum from this album also helped boost her following German album, Meine Lieder sind mein Leben. In 1984, Mouskouri returned to Greece and performed to a large audience at the Odeon of Herodes Atticus; her first performance in her homeland since 1962.

In 1985, Mouskouri recorded "Only Love", the theme song to the American TV series Mistral's Daughter – based upon the novel by Judith Krantz – which reached number 2 in the UK charts. The song was also a hit in its other versions: L'Amour en héritage (French), Come un'eredità (Italian), La dicha del amor (Spanish), and Aber die Liebe bleibt (German). The German version was also recorded with an alternative set of lyrics under the title Der wilde Wein; it was withdrawn in favour of Aber die Liebe bleibt.

That same year, Mouskouri made a play for the Spanish-language market with the hit single Con Toda el Alma. The song was a major success in Spain, Argentina and Chile.

Mouskouri released five albums in different languages in 1987, and the following year returned to her classical conservatory roots with the double LP The Classical Nana (a.k.a. Nana Classique), which featured adaptations of classical songs and excerpts from opera. By the end of 1987, she had performed a series of concerts in Asia, including South Korea, Taiwan, Singapore, Hong Kong, Malaysia and Thailand.

== Later years ==
Mouskouri's 1991 English album, Only Love: The Best of Nana Mouskouri, became her best-selling release in the United States. She spent much of the 1990s touring the globe. Among her early 1990s albums were spiritual music, Gospel (1990), the Spanish-language Nuestras Canciones, the multilingual, Mediterranean-themed Côté Sud, Côté Coeur (1992), Dix Mille Ans Encore, Falling in Love Again: Great Songs From the Movies. Falling in Love featured two duets with Harry Belafonte.

In 1993, Mouskouri recorded the album Hollywood. Produced by Michel Legrand it was a collection of famous songs from films, and served not only as a tribute to the world of cinema, but also as a personal reference to childhood memories of sitting with her father in his projection room in Crete.

She recorded several more albums in 1996 and 1997, including the Spanish Nana Latina (which featured duets with Julio Iglesias and Mercedes Sosa), the English-language Return to Love, and the French pop classics, Hommages. In 1997, she staged a high-profile Concert for Peace at the Cathedral of St. John the Divine in New York. This concert was later released as an album, and aired as a TV special on PBS in the United States.

On 30 May 2013, Mouskouri was awarded an honorary degree by McGill University, Canada.

== UNICEF and politics ==
Mouskouri was appointed a UNICEF Goodwill Ambassador in October 1993. She took over from the previous ambassador, the recently deceased actress Audrey Hepburn. Mouskouri's first U.N. mission took her to Bosnia to draw attention to the plight of children affected by the Bosnian war. She went on to give a series of fund-raising concerts in Sweden and Belgium.

She was a Member of the European Parliament for Greece through the centre-right New Democracy party from 1994 until 1999, when she resigned from her position as an MEP. Several reasons have been given for the resignation, one being her pacifism, and another being that she felt ill-equipped for the day-to-day work of a politician.

== 21st century ==
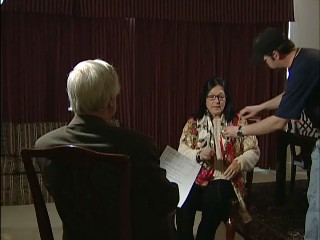
Nana Mouskouri, waiting for an interview in 2006

Mouskouri lives in Switzerland with Chapelle, and, until her final performance in 2008, performed hundreds of concerts every year throughout her career. In 2004, her French record company released a 34-CD box set of more than 600 of Mouskouri's mostly French songs. In 2006, she made a guest appearance at that year's Eurovision Song Contest which was held, for the first time ever, in her native Greece.

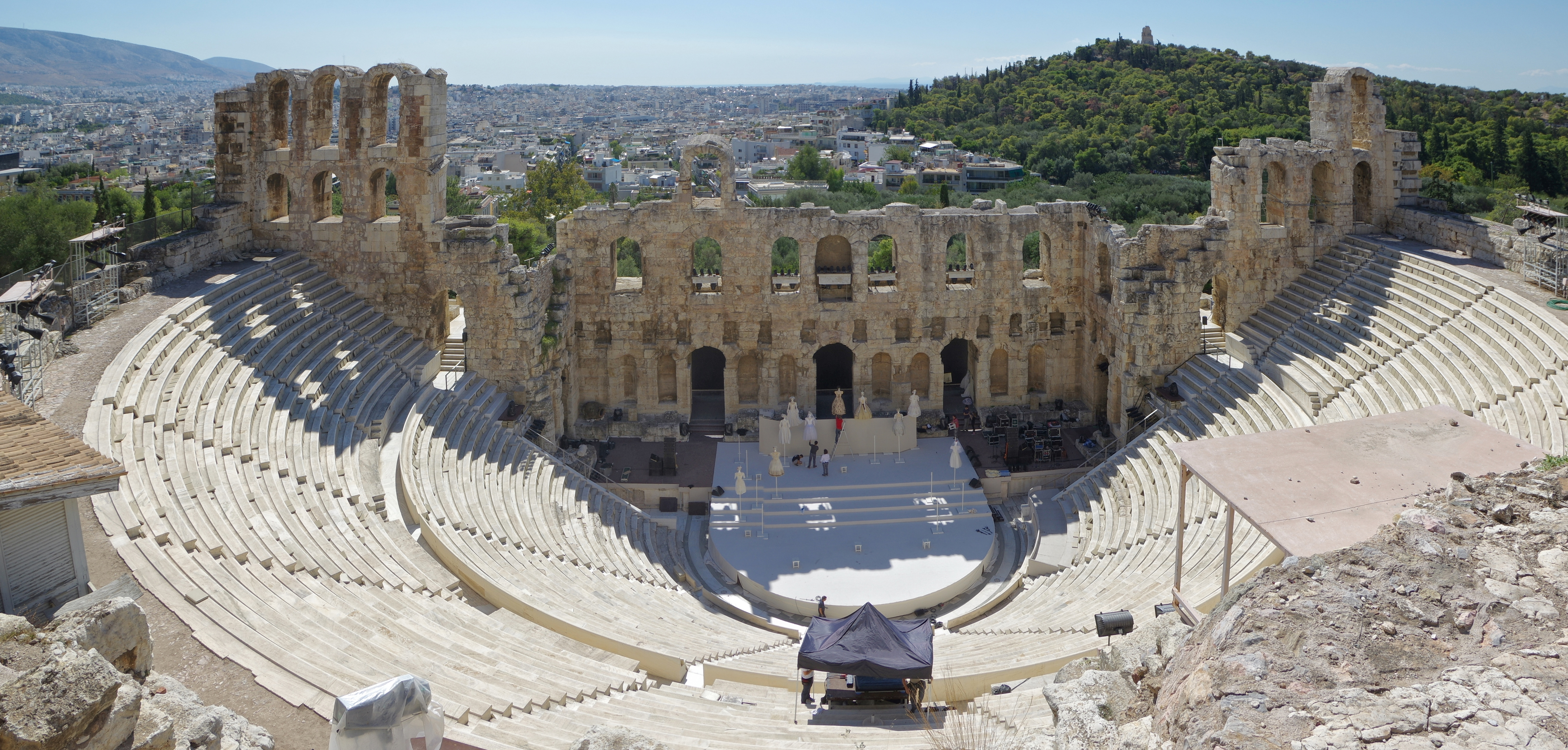
The ancient Herodes Atticus Theatre, in Athens, Greece

In the same year, she announced her plans to retire. From 2005 until 2008, she conducted a farewell concert tour of Europe, Australia, New Zealand, Asia, South America, the United States, and Canada. On July 23 and 24, 2008, Mouskouri gave her two final 'Farewell Concert' performances at the ancient Herodes Atticus Theatre, in Athens, Greece, before a packed stadium, including Greece's Prime Minister and the mayor of Athens, plus the mayors of Berlin, Paris and Luxembourg, along with fans from around the world and thousands of her Athenian admirers.

In 2010, in response to the Greek government-debt crisis, Mouskouri announced that she would forgo her pension to contribute to the country's recovery. She commented: "Everywhere I see stories about my country going bankrupt. And people are aggressive about it. It's frightening. And it's painful for me. Nobody wants their country to be treated badly. It's frustrating and very sad."

In late 2011, Mouskouri released two newly recorded CDs, the first featuring songs of the Greek Islands, recorded with other Greek singers, and the second featuring duets with French contemporaries. In late November 2011, Mouskouri sang again at a single concert, with guests, in Berlin, commemorating the 50th anniversary of her hit single "The White Rose of Athens". She then did a concert tour in Germany in 2012. At age 80, she embarked on a three-year Happy Birthday Tour; in 2018 she had booked a five-month Forever Young Tour through parts of Europe and North America.

In 2015, she was awarded with the Echo Music Prize for Outstanding achievements by the German music association Deutsche Phono-Akademie.

Despite her 'farewell tour' and 'final concert', she continues to make occasional appearances on TV shows, especially in Germany, though increasingly using 'le playback' (miming), which, unlike many other singers, she rarely used through most of her career; the most recent at time of writing was the 2023-12-2 German (ARD1) 'Das Adventsfest der 100 000 Lichter' (advent celebration of 100,000 lights - coincidentally the show's title partially reflecting one of her early [1965] German hits), in which she duetted one song and participated in the finale.

In 2024, at the age of 89, Nana performed ‘’La Marseillaise’’ and the Greek anthem at the Olympic Handover in Athens - a ceremony in which Greece handed the Olympic flame to the 2024 Summer Olympics host, Paris.

Commemorating her 90th birthday, 4 new albums were released - "Happy Birthday, Nana" in Germany with the Royal Philharmonic Orchestra; "90th Birthday" in England; "90 Cumpleaños" in Spain and "90e anniversaire" in France. A new version of the Greek song "Pios échi Dakria" is included in the albums.

In 2025, her song "Guten Morgen, Sonnenschein" became a viral hit amongst younger generation after being played in the Netflix series - Cassandra. Since the show’s debut, the song has had over 37 million streams on Spotify, 15 million YouTube views, and a staggering 1027% increase in listens on Deezer in France alone. On TikTok over 30 000 fan-made videos with the song were created, reimagining the eerie wake-up scenes or dancing to its beat.

== In popular culture ==
The British comedian Benny Hill impersonated Mouskouri on The Benny Hill Show. Wearing a long dress, large glasses and long black hair, he talked and sang with a slow and quiet voice. He introduced a song with a long translation into English of all the events supposedly mentioned in the song; he then sang just a single line of "Greek".

Andrea Martin played Mouskouri in a sketch, 'The Nana Mouskouri Story', during the 1981–1982 season of SCTV (later included in a DVD compilation).

In 2015, Liina Vahtrik parodied her song "Only Love" on the Estonian version of Your Face Sounds Familiar.

== Chart records and certifications ==
United Kingdom

In the UK, Mouskouri performed quite successfully. Her 1976 release titled Passport was certified Gold while her 1977 album The Magic of Nana Mouskouri also attained Gold status a year after it was released. She also had two other silver certified albums, Alone (1986) and At Her Very Best (2001).

France

In France, Mouskouri achieved her first gold certification in 1995 with her 1987 release titled Nana Mouskouri 1. Three years after, she scored her second Gold record with her 1987 album Master Serie Vo. 1.

Germany

In Germany, Mouskouri has six albums that received certifications from BVMI.Nana Mouskouri In New York received 5× Gold in 2015 for selling over 50,000 in Germany. Other albums that received 1× Gold certification includes the albums Die schönsten deutschen Weihnachtslieder, Lieder, die die Liebe schreibt, Alles Liebe, Die Welt ist voll Licht and Sieben schwarze Rosen.

United States

In the US, her album titled Only Love - The Best of Nana Mouskouri charted and peaked at No. 141 on Billboard 200, spending six weeks on chart. This is her highest charting project in the country. In 2007, I'll Remember You peaked at No. 22 on Billboard Traditional Jazz Albums and No. 42 on Billboard Jazz Albums. In 1998, Concert for Peace peaked at No. 7 on Billboard World Albums and charted for six weeks.

Canada

In Canada, Live at the Albert Hall (1974) reached No. 49, Songs Of The British Isles (1976) reached No. 89. Je Chante Avec Toi Liberte was certified platinum in 1985 for selling over 100,000 copies in the country. When I Dream (1983) reached No. 65. Her 2018 and most recent album Forever Young debuted at No. 73 on Billboard Canadian Albums.

Others

The single "White Roses from Athens” was released in 1961, which stayed at number 1 on the charts for 39 weeks and sold more than 1.5 million copies within six months.

Nana Mouskouri won a World Music Award for Best-Selling Greek Recording Artist two years in a row, in 1991 and 1992.

In 1992, Spin magazine included Mouskouri on their list of "7 chart-toppers you won't see on MTV" and stated that Mouskouri sells two million records each year worldwide and has released about 800 albums in seven different languages.

In 1996, Platinum Europe Awards handed Mouskouri a special award saying "Europe is a great musical culture". She also received a Golden Disc Award for "Weisse Rosen Aus Athen" and became the first Philip artist to reach one million sales.

In 2003, Arion Greek Music Awards honored Mouskouri with a Lifetime Achievement Award.

In 2015, Echo Awards honored Mouskouri with a Lifetime Achievement Award for her undeniable impact and legacy.

== Discography ==
=== Notable albums ===
List of albums, with selected chart positions, sales, and certifications
Title	Album details	Peak chart positions										Sales	Certifications
Title	Album details	GRE	AUT	BEL	CAN	FRA	GER	NLD	NZ	SPA	UK	Sales	Certifications
In New York the Girl from Greece Sings	Released: 1962; Label: Mercury; Formats: LP	7	—	—	—	—	—	—	—	—	—		BVMI: 5× Gold
Le Disque d'or de Nana Mouskouri	Released: 1964; Label: Fontana; Formats: LP, cassette	—	—	—	—	—	—	—	—	—	—		CRIA: Gold
Over and Over	Released: 1969; Label: Fontana; Formats: LP	—	—	—	—	—	—	—	—	—	10		
The Exquisite Nana Mouskouri	Released: 1969; Label: Fontana; Formats: LP	—	—	—	—	—	—	—	—	—	10		
Recital 70	Released: 1970; Label: Fontana; Formats: LP	—	—	—	—	—	—	—	—	—	68		
Turn on the Sun	Released: 1970; Label: Fontana; Formats: LP	—	—	—	—	—	—	—	—	—	16		
Nana Mouskouri's Grand Gala	Released: 1970; Label: Fontana; Formats: LP	—	—	—	—	—	—	5	—	—	—		
Comme un soleil	Released: 1971; Label: Fontana; Formats: LP	—	—	—	—	—	—	—	—	—	—	FRA: 130,000	CRIA: Gold
British Concert	Released: 1972; Label: Fontana; Formats: LP	—	—	—	—	—	—	—	—	—	29		CRIA: Platinum
Greatest Hits	Released: 1972; Label: Fontana; Formats: LP	—	—	—	—	—	—	6	—	—	—		
Une voix qui vient du cœur	Released: 1972; Label: Fontana; Formats: LP, cassette	—	—	—	—	—	—	—	—	—	—		SNEP: Gold; CRIA: Gold
Christmas with Nana Mouskouri	Released: 1972; Label: Fontana; Formats: LP, cassette	—	—	—	—	—	—	—	—	—	—		CRIA: Platinum
Vieilles chansons de France	Released: 1972; Label: Fontana; Formats: LP, cassette	—	—	—	—	—	—	—	—	—	—		SNEP: Gold
Songs from Her TV Series	Released: 1973; Label: Fontana; Formats: LP	—	—	—	—	—	—	—	—	—	29		
Spotlight on Nana Mouskouri	Released: 1973; Label: Fontana; Formats: LP	—	—	—	—	—	—	—	—	—	38		CRIA: Gold
Nana Mouskouri's Greatest Hits	Released: 1973; Label: Fontana; Formats: LP	—	—	—	—	—	—	—	15	—	—		
Nana Mouskouri I	Released: 1974; Label: Impact; Formats: LP	—	—	—	—	—	—	—	—	—	—		SNEP: Gold
Nana's Book of Songs	Released: 1974; Label: Fontana; Formats: LP	—	—	—	—	—	—	3	—	—	—		
Sieben schwarze Rosen	Released: 1975; Label: Philips; Formats: LP, cassette, CD	—	—	—	—	—	18	—	—	—	—		BVMI: Gold
Een Stem Uit Het Hart	Released: 1975; Label: Philips; Formats: LP	—	—	—	—	—	—	14	—	—	—		
Die Welt ist voll Licht	Released: 1976; Label: Philips; Formats: LP, cassette, CD	—	5	—	—	—	14	—	—	—	—		BVMI: Gold
Nana Mouskouri singt die schönsten deutschen Weihnachtslieder	Released: 1976; Label: Philips; Formats: LP, cassette, CD	—	—	—	—	—	—	—	—	—	—		BVMI: Gold
Nana in Holland	Released: 1976; Label: Philips; Formats: LP	—	—	—	—	—	—	12	—	—	—		
Passport	Released: 1976; Label: Philips; Formats: LP, cassette, CD	—	—	—	—	—	—	9	—	5	3		BPI: Gold
Glück ist wie ein Schmetterling	Released: 1978; Label: Philips; Formats: LP, cassette, CD	—	—	—	—	—	31	—	—	—	—		
Lieder, die die Liebe schreibt	Released: 1978; Label: Philips; Formats: LP, cassette, CD	—	—	—	—	—	24	—	—	—	—		BVMI: Gold
Roses & Sunshine	Released: 1979; Label: Cachet Records; Formats: LP	—	—	—	37 (4wks)	—	—	—	—	—	—		CRIA: 2× Platinum
Come with Me	Released: 1980; Label: Grand Records; Formats: LP, cassette	—	—	—	23	—	—	—	—	—	—		CRIA: Platinum
Je chante avec toi Liberté	Released: 1981; Label: Philips; Formats: LP, cassette	—	—	—	42 (3wks)	—	—	—	—	—	—		CRIA: Platinum
Meine Lieder sind mein Leben	Released: 1981; Label: Philips; Formats: LP, cassette	—	—	—	—	—	26	—	—	—	—		
Alles Liebe...	Released: 1981; Label: Philips; Formats: LP, cassette	—	2	—	—	—	2	—	—	—	—		BVMI: Gold
The Very Best of Nana Mouskouri	Released: 1981; Label: Fontana; Formats: LP	—	—	—	—	—	—	—	10	—	—		
Song for Liberty	Released: 1982; Label: Philips; Formats: LP, cassette	—	—	—	—	—	—	—	—	—	—		CRIA: Gold
Ma vérité	Released: 1985; Label: Philips; Formats: LP, cassette	—	—	—	—	—	—	—	—	—	—		CRIA: Gold
Alone	Released: 1985; Label: Fontana; Formats: LP	—	—	—	—	—	—	14	—	—	19		BPI: Silver; NVPI: Gold
Con Toda El Alma	Released: 1986; Label: Philips; Formats: LP, CD, cassette	—	—	—	—	—	—	—	—	1	—		Promusicae: 3× Platinum
Libertad	Released: 1986; Label: Philips; Formats: LP, CD, cassette	—	—	—	—	—	—	—	—	3	—		CAPIF: 2× Platinum; Promusicae: Gold
Kleine Wahrheiten	Released: 1986; Label: Mercury; Formats: LP, CD, cassette	—	—	—	—	—	49	—	—	—	—		
Only Love Songs	Released: 1986; Label: Philips; Formats: LP	—	—	—	—	—	—	28	—	—	—		
Why Worry	Released: 1987; Label: Philips; Formats: LP, CD, cassette	—	—	—	—	—	—	50	—	—	—		
Tierra Viva	Released: 1987; Label: Philips; Formats: LP, CD, cassette	—	—	—	—	—	—	—	—	5	—		
Nana	Released: 1987; Label: Philips; Formats: LP, CD, cassette	—	—	—	—	—	—	—	—	3	—		Promusicae: Gold
Master Serie	Released: 1987; Label: Philips; Formats: CD	—	—	—	—	—	—	—	—	—	—		SNEP: Gold
A Voice from the Heart	Released: 1988; Label: Philips; Formats: LP, CD, cassette	—	—	—	—	—	—	—	—	1	—		NVPI: Gold
The Magic of Nana Mouskouri	Released: 1988; Label: Philips; Formats: LP, CD, cassette	—	—	—	—	—	—	—	—	—	44		BPI: Gold
The Classical Nana	Released: 1989; Label: Philips; Formats: LP, CD, cassette	—	—	—	—	—	—	—	—	—	—		CAPIF: Platinum
Concierto en Aranjuez	Released: 1989; Label: Philips; Formats: LP, CD, cassette	—	—	—	—	—	—	—	—	8	—	SPA: 425,000	Promusicae: Platinum
Nuestras Canciones	Released: 1991; Label: Philips; Formats: LP, CD, cassette	—	—	—	—	—	—	—	—	8	—		Promusicae: Platinum
The Best of Nana Mouskouri	Released: 1992; Label: Philips; Formats: CD	—	—	—	—	—	—	—	—	—	—		CRIA: Platinum
Recuerdos	Released: 1994; Label: Philips; Formats: LP, CD, cassette	—	—	—	—	—	—	—	—	—	—		Promusicae: Gold
Les triomphes de Nana Mouskouri	Released: 1995; Label: Philips; Formats: CD	—	—	49	—	—	—	—	—	—	—		
Hommages	Released: 1997; Label: Philips; Formats: CD	—	—	—	—	46	—	—	—	—	—		
Classic	Released: 2001; Label: Mercury; Formats: CD	—	—	—	—	70	49	—	—	—	—		
At Her Very Best	Released: 2001; Label: Philips; Formats: CD	—	—	—	—	—	—	—	—	—	39		BPI: Silver
Erinnerungen – meine grössten Erfolge	Released: 2001; Label: Mercury; Formats: CD	—	—	—	—	—	68	—	—	—	—		
Boleros Canciones Recuerdos	Released: 2002; Label: Mercury; Formats: CD	—	—	—	—	—	—	—	—	50	—		
Fille du soleil	Released: 2002; Label: Mercury; Formats: CD	—	—	—	—	98	—	—	—	—	—		
Ich hab gelacht, ich hab geweint	Released: 2004; Label: Koch Universal; Formats: CD	—	40	—	—	—	61	—	—	—	—		
Gold: Greatest Hits	Released: 2002; Label: Philips; Formats: CD	—	—	—	—	—	—	—	—	—	—		CRIA: Gold
The Definitive Collection	Released: 2005; Label: Mercury; Formats: CD	—	—	—	—	—	—	—	20	—	—		
I'll Remember	Released: 2005; Label: Mercury; Formats: CD	22	—	—	—	—	—	—	37	—	—		
Meine schönsten Welterfolge	Released: 2008; Label: Mercury; Formats: CD	—	—	—	—	—	99	—	—	—	—		
Rendez-vous	Released: 2011; Label: Mercury; Formats: CD	—	—	46	—	14	—	—	—	—	—		
Tragoudia Apo Ta Ellinikia	Released: 2011; Label: Mercury; Formats: CD	2	—	—	—	—	—	—	—	—	—		
Happy Birthday Tour	Released: 2014; Label: Mercury; Formats: CD	—	—	63	—	112	—	—	—	—	—		
Forever Young	Released: 2018; Label: Mercury; Formats: CD	—	—	66	73	83	99	—	—	—	—		
Quand on s'aime – Tribute to Michel Legrand	Released: 2019; Label: Mercury; Formats: CD	—	—	126	—	—	—	—	—	—	—		
Chants sacrés	Released: 2019; Label: Mercury; Formats: CD	—	—	76	—	106	—	—	—	—	—		
Happy Birthday, Nana	Released: 2024; Label: Electrola; Formats: CD	—	47	—	—	—	67	—	—	—	—		

== Autobiographies ==
- Chanter ma vie, by Nana Mouskouri, Grasset ed., Paris 1989. ISBN 2-246-39211-X and ISBN 978-2-246-39211-8 (in French).
- Το όνομά μου είναι Νάνα (To ónomá mou eínai Nána, "My Name Is Nana"), by Nana Mouskouri, Livani Publishing, Athens 2006. ISBN 960-14-1341-3, ISBN 978-960-14-1341-9 (in Greek).
- Mémoires: La fille de la chauve-souris, by Nana Mouskouri with Lionel Duroy, XO Éditions, Paris 2007. ISBN 2-84563-311-4 and ISBN 978-2-84563-311-7 (in French).
  - Memoirs, by Nana Mouskouri with Lionel Duroy, translated by Jeremy Leggatt, Weidenfeld & Nicolson, London 2007. ISBN 0-297-84469-5 and ISBN 978-0-297-84469-3 (in English).
  - Stimme der Sehnsucht: Meine Erinnerungen, by Nana Mouskouri with Lionel Duroy, translated by Ulrike Lelickens, Schwarzkopf & Schwarzkopf, Berlin 2008. ISBN 3-89602-848-0 and ISBN 978-3-89602-848-8 (in German).

== See also ==
- List of Greek musical artists
- List of multilingual bands and artists
- List of people from Crete

Preceded by Camillo Felgen	Luxembourg in the Eurovision Song Contest; 1963	Succeeded by Hugues Aufray
