= Sainte-Pience =

- Part of Le Parc
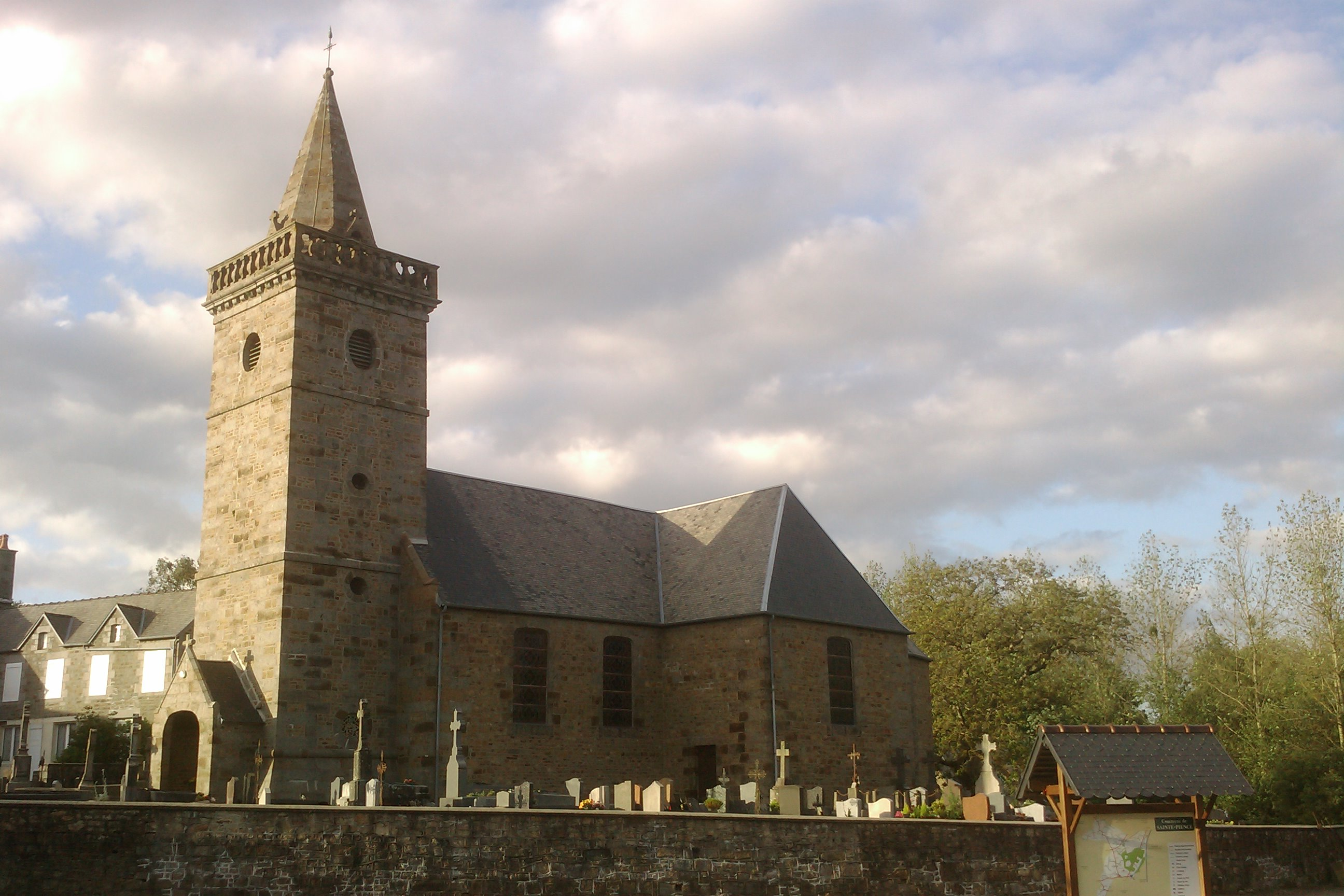
- The church of Sainte-Pience
- Location of Sainte-Pience
- Location within France Location within Normandy
- Coordinates: 48°45′52″N 1°18′05″W
- Country: France
- Region: Normandy
- Department: Manche
- Arrondissement: Avranches
- Canton: Bréhal
- Commune: Le Parc
- Area^{1}: 8.68 km^{2} (3.35 sq mi)
- Elevation: 203 m (666 ft)
- Highest elevation: 201 m (659 ft)
- Lowest elevation: 105 m (344 ft)
- Population (2013): 318
  - Density: 36.6/km^{2} (94.9/sq mi)
- Time zone: UTC+01:00 (CET)
  - Summer (DST): UTC+02:00 (CEST)
- Postal code: 50870
- ^{1} French Land Register data, which excludes lakes, ponds, glaciers > 1 km^{2} (0.386 sq mi or 247 acres) and river estuaries.

Sainte-Pience (French pronunciation: [sɛ̃t pjɑ̃s]) is a former commune in the Manche department in Normandy in north-western France. On 1 January 2016, it was merged into the new commune of Le Parc.

== See also ==
- Communes of the Manche department
