= Je chante avec toi Liberté =

1981 song by Nana Mouskouri

"Je chante avec toi Liberté" (1981) also known in English as "Song for Liberty" (1970) is a song written by Pierre Delanoë and Claude Lemesle, arranged by Alain Goraguer and performed by Nana Mouskouri. The melody is from "Va, pensiero" (Italian: [va penˈsjɛro]) also known in English as the "Chorus of the Hebrew Slaves" from the opera Nabucco (1842) by Giuseppe Verdi.

Nana Mouskouri has performed this song in at least five languages; French ("Je chante avec toi liberté"), English ("Song for Liberty"), German ("Lied der Freiheit"), Spanish ("Libertad") and Portuguese ("Liberdade").
