= Cohors I Cretum sagittaria =

Cohors I Cretum quingenaria peditata sagittaria
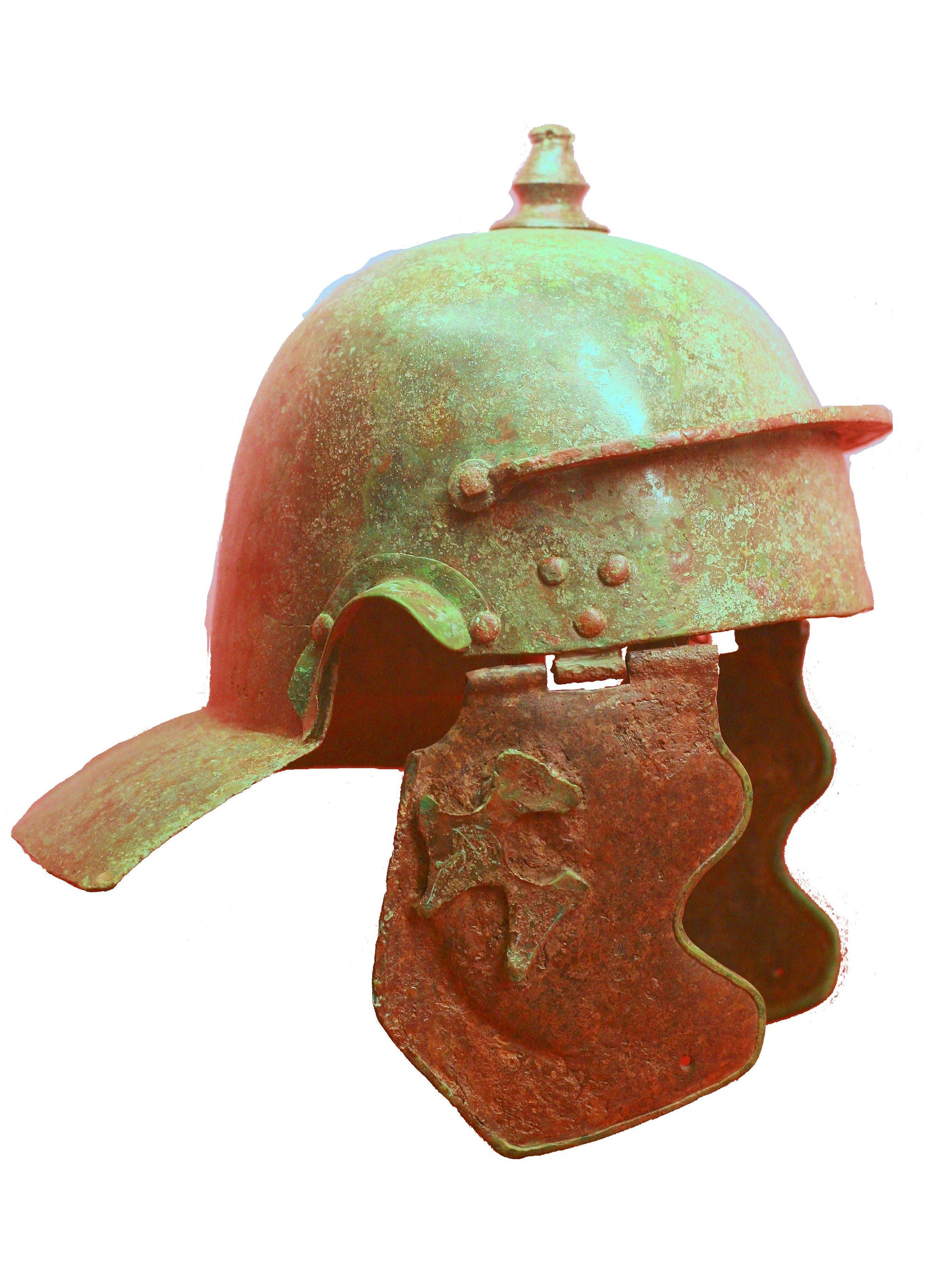
- Roman infantry helmet (late 1st century)
- Active: ?
- Country: Roman Empire
- Type: Roman auxiliary cohort
- Role: infantry
- Size: 480 men (480 infantry)

Cohors [prima] Cretum [quingenaria peditata] sagittaria ("[1st infantry 500 strong] archer cohort of Cretans") was a Roman auxiliary archers regiment. The cohort was stationed in Dacia at castra Drobeta.

== See also ==
- List of Roman auxiliary regiments
