= Eurybotas =

Eurybotas (Ancient Greek: Ευρυβώτας) of Crete was the toxarch (τοξάρχης), meaning captain of the archers, in the army of Alexander the Great, a position to which he may have been summoned already by the Philip II, when he planned his Asiatic campaign. Eurybotas was killed, along with seventy of his men, in the Siege of Thebes in 335 BC. His successor appears to have been Ombrion (Ὀμβρίον) of Crete.

Cretan archers were highly skilled and were an essential part of Greek military tactics. The Cretan archers were generally mercenaries.
