= Yves de Montcheuil =

French Jesuit philosopher and resistance member (1900–1944)

The Reverend Yves de Montcheuil SJ
- Born: January 30, 1900; Paimpol, France
- Died: August 8, 1944 (aged 44); Grenoble, France
- Education: Jesuit universities of Jersey and Fourvière and Rome
- Occupation: Priest
- Years active: 1932–1944
- Notable work: Malebranche et le quiétisme, Témoignage chrétien
- Theological work
- Tradition or movement: Nouvelle théologie
- Notable ideas: Ecclesiology as counter-totalitarian

Yves Moreau de Montcheuil SJ (French pronunciation: [iv mɔ.ʁo də mɔ̃ʃœj]; 30 January 1900 – 8 August 1944) was a Jesuit priest, philosopher, and theologian. He was a close friend of Henri de Lubac. De Montcheuil joined the French Resistance during World War II and was executed by the Gestapo.

== Biography ==
De Montcheuil was born 30 January 1900, in Paimpol, Brittany. He entered the Jesuits in 1917 after abandoning plans to enter the École Navale following his brother's disappearance during the Battle of Verdun. He studied at the novitiate in Jersey under Pedro Descoqs, whose support of Action Française and opposition to the emergent nouvelle theólogie and thought of Maurice Blondel led to discord. He went on to study at the Jesuit house in Fourvière from 1929 to 1932, was ordained a priest in 1932, completed doctoral studies in 1935 with a dissertation on Nicolas Malebranche, and was a professor at the Institut Catholique de Paris from 1935 until his death in 1944. He professed his final vows as a Jesuit in 1935. As a member of the French Resistance, he served as a chaplain at the Battle of Vercors and was executed by the Gestapo.

== Thought ==
As a student, De Montcheuil felt stifled by the Neo-Scholastic intellectual climate of the Jesuit college in Jersey.

De Montcheuil was deeply influenced by Maurice Blondel and maintained a correspondence with him. He believed that imitation of Thomas Aquinas's intellectual spirit was more important than strict fidelity to Aquinas's works. De Montcheuil's 1935 dissertation L’Intervention de Malebranche dans la querelle du pur amour, in a manner evocative of his Jesuit predecessor Pierre Rousselot, focused on Malebranche's debate with Bernard Lamy over quietism. De Montcheuil reads Malebranche's contribution to the debate along the lines of Blondel and Rousselot, arguing implicitly that Malebranche anticipates their thought by seeking a harmony between nature and the supernatural and between philosophy and theology. Maurice Blondel's views and nouvelle théologie were initially deeply controversial and some of De Montcheuil's works were briefly censored after his death and the publication of the encyclical Humani generis.

De Montcheuil also wrote on ecclesiology, emphasizing the mystical union of the church in a manner similar to that of the Catholic Tübingen school. De Montcheuil felt this view of ecclesiology provided theological opposition to totalitarianism.

== Political activity ==
De Montcheuil served as a chaplain to the Jeunesse Étudiante Chrétienne. Along with his classmates Henri de Lubac, Gaston Fessard, and Pierre Chaillet, De Montcheuil would launch the anti-Nazi journal Témoignage chrétien.

== Legacy ==
De Montcheuil is considered a forerunner of liberation theology, as Gustavo Gutierrez studied his work and argued that De Montcheuil's rejection of the nature-grace dualism of Neo-Scholasticism provided the basis for a political theology superior to that of Jacques Maritain, whose alternative to the Neo-Scholastic paradigm in politics Gutierrez still found insufficient.
