= Jules Lebreton =

French professor

Jules Marie Lebreton (20 March 1873 in Tours – 6 July 1956 in Neuilly-sur-Seine) was a Jesuit and professor of the History of Christian Origins at the Institut catholique de Paris.

Lebreton entered the Society of Jesus in 1890. He received the degree of Docteur des lettres in 1901, and was ordained in 1903. In 1905 he was appointed a professor of Dogmatic Theology in the faculty of theology at the Institut catholique de Paris. Two years later, he was appointed chair of the History of Christian Origins in the same faculty, a post that he held until his retirement in 1943. His magisterial Histoire du dogme de la Trinité, Vol. 1: Les Origines was published in 1910. Vol. 2: De saint Clement à saint Irenée came out in 1928. Although other preoccupations prevented the continuance of the work as originally projected, Henri de Lubac judged it "one of the great theological works of our time".

== Works ==
- Le Dieu Vivant (The Living God), Beauchesne, (1919).
- Histoire Du Dogme De La Trinite Des Origines Au Concile De Nicee (History of the Dogma of the Trinity from its Origins to the Council of Nicaea), Beauchesne, (1927).
- The History Of The Primitive Church, Volume I, Books I And II, Macmillan, (1944).
