= Sotades of Crete =

Ancient Olympic runner

Sotades of Crete was an ancient Olympic runner.

== Career ==
Winner in the long distance race, the dolichos of 384 BC.

Afterwards Sotades was bribed by the Ephesians to be proclaimed as a citizen of Ephesos (Ephesus) and was subsequently exiled by the Cretans.

Sotades competed again as a citizen of Ephesus in 380 BC.
