= Braffais =

- Part of Le Parc
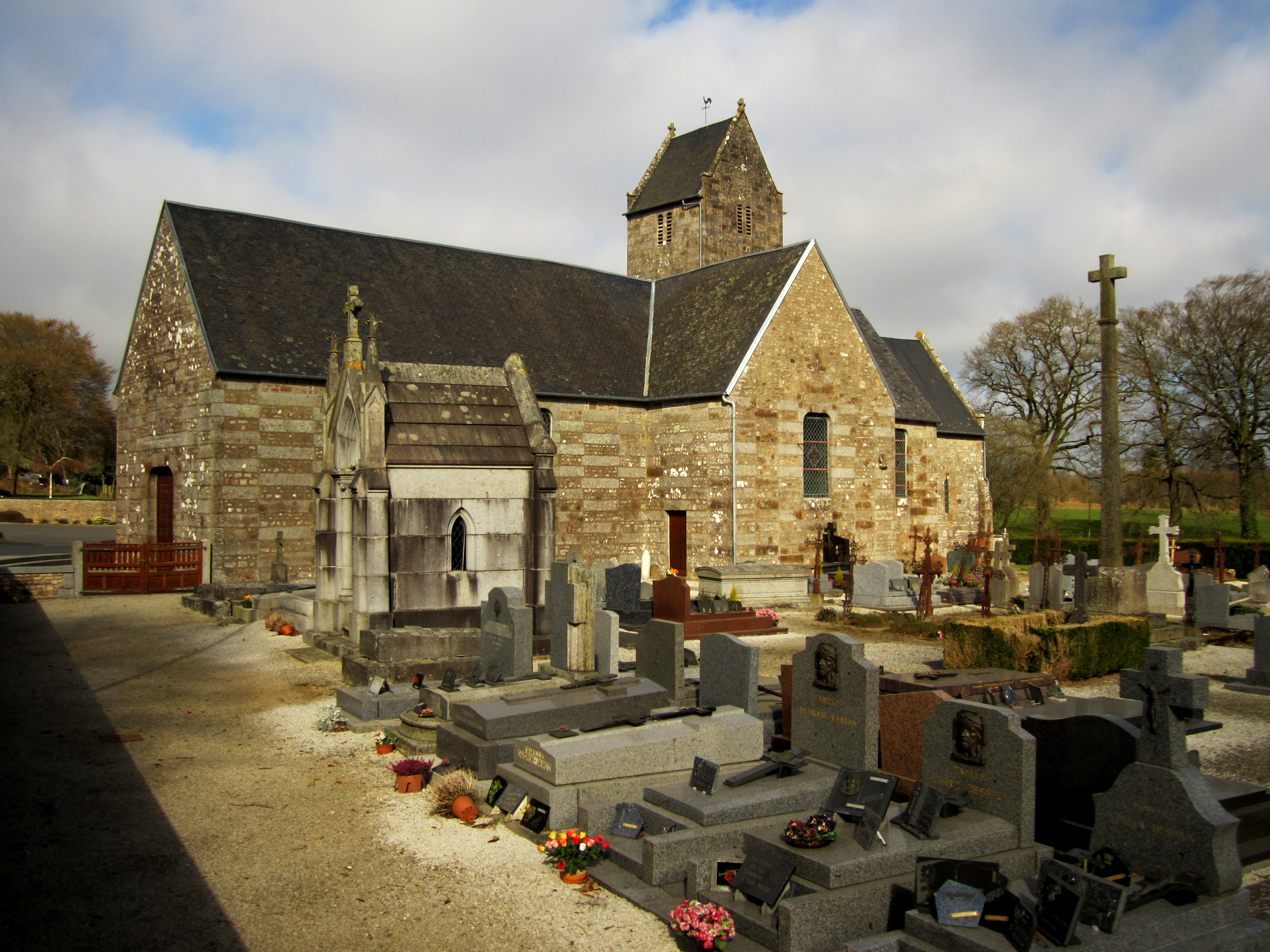
- The church of Saint-Martin
- Location of Braffais
- Location within France Location within Normandy
- Coordinates: 48°45′28″N 1°15′36″W
- Country: France
- Region: Normandy
- Department: Manche
- Arrondissement: Avranches
- Canton: Isigny-le-Buat
- Commune: Le Parc
- Area^{1}: 5.79 km^{2} (2.24 sq mi)
- Elevation: 178 m (584 ft)
- Highest elevation: 182 m (597 ft)
- Lowest elevation: 56 m (184 ft)
- Population (2013): 192
  - Density: 33.2/km^{2} (85.9/sq mi)
- Time zone: UTC+01:00 (CET)
  - Summer (DST): UTC+02:00 (CEST)
- Postal code: 50870
- ^{1} French Land Register data, which excludes lakes, ponds, glaciers > 1 km^{2} (0.386 sq mi or 247 acres) and river estuaries.

Braffais (French pronunciation: [bʁafɛ]) is a former commune in the Manche department in Normandy in northwestern France. On 1 January 2016, it was merged into the new commune of Le Parc.

== See also ==
- Communes of the Manche department
