= Plomb =

- Part of Le Parc
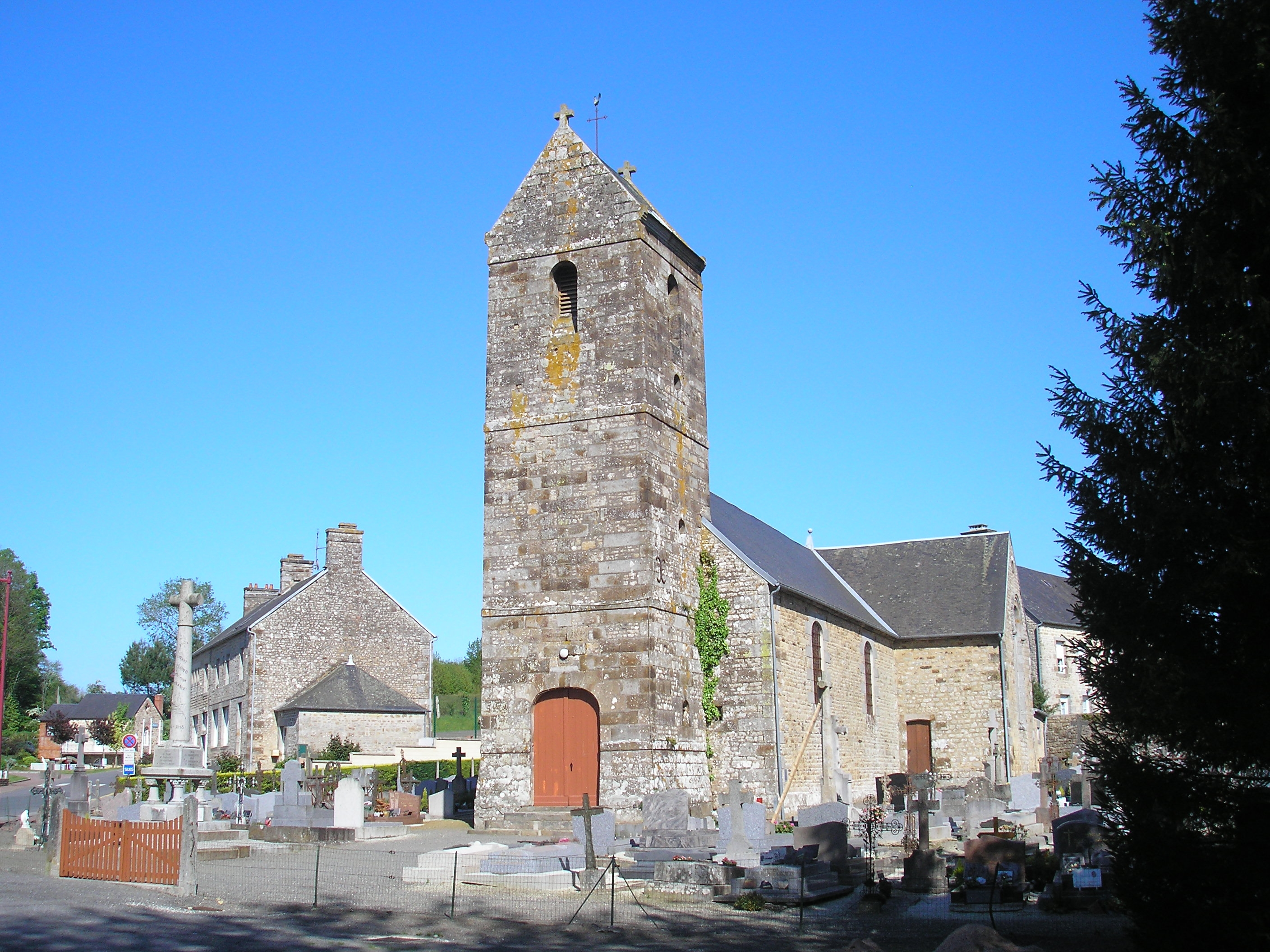
- The church of Saint-Martin
- Location of Plomb
- Location within France Location within Normandy
- Coordinates: 48°43′52″N 1°18′03″W
- Country: France
- Region: Normandy
- Department: Manche
- Arrondissement: Avranches
- Canton: Avranches
- Commune: Le Parc
- Area^{1}: 8.16 km^{2} (3.15 sq mi)
- Elevation: 133 m (436 ft)
- Highest elevation: 148 m (486 ft)
- Lowest elevation: 14 m (46 ft)
- Population (2013): 394
  - Density: 48.3/km^{2} (125/sq mi)
- Time zone: UTC+01:00 (CET)
  - Summer (DST): UTC+02:00 (CEST)
- Postal code: 50870
- ^{1} French Land Register data, which excludes lakes, ponds, glaciers > 1 km^{2} (0.386 sq mi or 247 acres) and river estuaries.

Plomb (French pronunciation: [plɔ̃]) is a former commune in the Manche department in Normandy in north-western France. On 1 January 2016, it was merged into the new commune of Le Parc.

== See also ==
- Communes of the Manche department
