= Louis Briffa =

Maltese poet

- Born: 1971 (age 54–55); Attard, Malta
- Occupation: Poet
- Website: www.louisbriffa.com/%20www.louisbriffa.com

Louis Briffa (born in Attard 1971) is a Maltese poet.

== Education ==
Briffa received his education at the Precision Engineering Centre, Marsa (1990–1991) and at the Technical Institute, George Grognet De Vasse, Naxxar (1992). He joined the Public Service of Malta in 1989 as an apprentice as he continued studying privately.

== Literary career ==
Briffa started writing poetry at the age of nine. His literary works have appeared in periodicals, magazines and Maltese newspapers.

Louis Briffa shows great awareness of the need to choose the right word, and his rhythmic patterns closely reflect the content. For him, rhythm complements the sense and it frequently engages him in figurative language to convey psychological states.

He was literary editor of Kullħadd, a weekly Maltese newspaper, between 1994 and 1998. He worked as narrator and producer of a literary programme, Nixxiegħa (PBS). In 1994 he joined forces with a fellow writer and poet Carmel Scicluna to set up a new literary movement for budding poets and writers. Louis Briffa was elected president of the Għaqda Letterarja Maltija for 2007-08. Some of his patriotic poems have been recited in activities held to commemorate national events, such as Independence day (21 September) and Freedom day (31 March).

He is represented in the book Jiflu Żmienhom (2003), an anthology of poems, by Poeżijaplus, published by Klabb Kotba Maltin. Bil-Varloppa (2006) is a collection of poems and prose poetry written between 1985 and 2005. "The Tale of a Grasshopper and a Tomato and other poems" is a bilingual edition of Briffa's best poems published in 2009. Poems in this book were translated in English by Rose Marie Caruana.

Throughout his literary career, he won various prizes - the main highlights being:

"Premju Ġieħ Ġuzè Aquilina" (1998)
"Premju Letterarju Patri Marjanu Vella" (2000)
National Book Prize Awards for poetry in Maltese for "Bil-Varloppa" (2007)
National Poetry Competition Mons. Amante Buontempo (2016)

Professor Oliver Friggieri called Briffa "A poet of love". Dr Paul Buhagiar described him as "the most original poetic voice of the first years of the 21st century.

== Personal life ==
As from 2014 to date, Louis Briffa is the Assistant Director at the Restoration Unit within the Ministry of Infrastructure, Transport, and Planning.

Briffa has a son, Bertrand born in 2007.
