= Jean-Mohammed Abd-el-Jalil =

Moroccan Catholic priest (1904–1979)

The Reverend Jean-Mohammed Abd-el-Jalil OFM
- Abd-el-Jalil in 1965
- Church: Catholic Church

Orders
- Ordination: 7 July 1935

Personal details
- Born: Mohammed ben Abd-el-Jalil; 17 April 1904 Fez, Morocco
- Died: 24 November 1979 (aged 75) Villejuif, Paris, France
- Education: University of al-Qarawiyyin; University of Paris; Institut Catholique de Paris

Jean-Mohammed Abd-el-Jalil, OFM, born Mohammed ben Abd-el-Jalil (Arabic: جون محمد بن عبد الجليل) (17 April 1904 – 24 November 1979) was a Moroccan Catholic priest, a convert from Islam, and Islamicist. He is considered a pioneer of interreligious dialogue in the Catholic Church.

== Biography ==
=== Early life ===
Mohammed ben Abd-el-Jalil was born 17 April 1904, in Fez, Morocco. He was born to a religious noble family of Andalusian descent, his father serving as a high-ranking government official. Abd-el-Jalil would later speak of his family being "poor and honorable." He was one of ten children, of whom only three survived to adulthood. His brother, Omar, served as a minister of education and agriculture in newly independent Morocco. At the age of nine years old in 1913 or 1914, Abd-el-Jalil accompanied his family on Hajj.

=== Education and conversion to Christianity ===
Abd-el-Jalil received an Islamic education in Moulay Idriss Zerhoun at the University of al-Qarawiyyin. As a young Muslim, Abd-el-Jalil was a disciple of the teachings of the Egyptian Salafi and modernist, Muhammad Abduh. He then received a Catholic secondary education at École Charles de Foucauld in Rabat, a Franciscan high school, with the insistence of his father that his son's religious identity be respected. The headmaster Clément Étienne took notice of his academic talents and recommended him for higher education in Paris. Abd-el-Jalil was brought to the attention of Hubert Lyautey, Resident-General in Morocco, and through him Étienne secured an education at the Sorbonne for Abd-el-Jalil and his brother Omar. In addition, Abd-el-Jalil received permission to take coursework at the Institut Catholique de Paris.

Despite his firm anti-Christian beliefs, he sought to study with Catholic professors in Paris, encountering Louis Massignon, Jacques Maritain, and Maurice Blondel. Moved by a mystical experience accompanying the family of his landlord to Midnight Mass and disquieted by apparent refutations of Islamic claims of textual corruption of the Bible, he began to investigate Christianity more seriously, initiating a correspondence with Paul Mulla, a Cretan Turkish priest and convert from Islam. Abd-el-Jalil decided to convert to Catholicism, taking Massignon as his godfather. On 7 April 1928, he was baptized Jean Clément Joseph Louis Mohammed after John the Baptist (mentioned in the Quran), Clément Étienne, Joseph (mentioned in the Quran), Louis Massignon, and – with explicit permission from Pope Pius XI – Muhammad. His conversion permanently alienated him from his father, who held a funeral for him in an empty casket and ignored his frequent letters. He then completed a critical edition of Shakwā al-Gharīb 'an al-Awtān ilā 'Ulamā' al-Buldān (lit. 'The Complaint of a Stranger Exiled from Home to the Scholars of the Lands') by Ayn al-Quzat Hamadani for his doctorate, which was translated into English by Arthur John Arberry as A Sufi Martyr: The Apologia of 'Ain al-Qudat al-Hamadhani.

=== Religious and academic life ===
On 17 September 1929, the feast day of the stigmata of Francis of Assisi, Abd-el-Jalil entered the Order of Friars Minor. He was ordained to the priesthood on 7 July 1935. His ordination card featured a calligraph of Quran 5:114, which speaks of Jesus bringing down a table from heaven to the disciples. Appointed a professor at the Institut Catholique de Paris in 1936, he published several books on Arabic and Islamic studies as well as Christian–Muslim relations, and numerous articles. In 1961, Abd-el-Jalil suffered a nervous breakdown and fled from Paris on 27 April to be with his brother in Fez, having seemingly reverted to Islam and this being reported in the Moroccan press. Believing he had made a mistake, he returned to Paris by 15 May, with the assistance of the Franciscan community in Morocco.

Abd-el-Jalil's ordination card featuring Quran 5:114

Abd-el-Jalil retired from teaching in 1964, having been diagnosed with tongue cancer. His work had a significant influence on the Second Vatican Council and its positive reassessment of Islam. Abd-el-Jalil was received in a private audience with Pope Paul VI in 1966. For the final fifteen years of his life, he was increasingly disabled and unable to participate in community life or public ministry, living as a virtual hermit. He died of his illness on 24 November 1979.

== Spirituality ==
Abd-el-Jalil was a member of the Badaliya prayer movement of Louis Massignon.

== Bibliography ==
- Shakwa l-gharib 'an al-awtan ila' 'ulama' al-buldan, de 'Ayn al Qudat al-Hamadani (mort en 525/1131), éd. et trad. avec introd. et notes, par Mohammed ben Abd El-Jalil [Shakwa al-Gharib ... by 'Ayn al-Qudat al-Hamadani (died 525/1131), edited and translated with introduction and notes, by Mohammed ben Abd-el-Jalil]. Journal asiatique (January–March and April–June 1930), pp. 1–297; Paris, Geuthner, 1933. (in French)
- Petite Anthologie Arabe [Little Arab Anthology]. Also published as al-Wajiz fi'l-adab al-'Arabi [Concise Arabic Literature]. Tunis, IBLA, 1938.
- Le Maroc [Morocco]. Illustrated brochure, Paris, Éditions Franciscaines, 1942. (in French)
- Brève histoire de la Littérature Arabe [A Brief History of Arabic Literature]. Paris, P.-G. Maisonneuve, 1943. (in French)
- L'Islam et Nous [Islam and Us]. Abbaye Saint-André-lez-Bruges et Paris, Le Cerf, 1947. (in French)
- Aspects Intérieurs de l'Islam [Inner Aspects of Islam]. Paris, Le Seuil, 1949. (in French)
- Marie et l'Islam [Mary and Islam]. Paris, Beauchesne, 1950. (in French)
