= Gaston Fessard =

French Jesuit and theologian (1897–1978)

Gaston Fessard (1897–1978) was a French Jesuit and theologian.

Father Fessard was the author of the first issue of Cahiers du Témoignage chrétien in November 1941, titled "France, Beware the Loss of Your Soul," which opposed Nazism in the name of Christian values. He also argued against the obligation to obey the Vichy government, elaborating his theory of the "slave prince," borrowed from Clausewitz: it is useful to obey the prince while he is sovereign and acts in the common interest, but resistance becomes necessary when the sovereignty of the slave-prince is limited and actions are dictated by the occupier. For this reason, the historian Roland Hureaux saw Fessard as "the theoretician of Gaullism" because of the importance that he accorded to the legitimacy of political power.

His rigorous analyses, his attention to engagement with the contemporary world—in the light of his Catholic faith—gave Fessard an exceptionally clear view of the future (for example, temporality and original sin) in political philosophy (he foresaw the failure of both Nazism and Communism). His approach is characteristically dialectical, drawing, for example, on the Master-Slave dialectic (inspired by Hegel) or the Man-Woman and Pagan-Jew dialectics.

Over the course of the twentieth century, Gaston Fessard was a noted analyst of important global political phenomena, the equal of Raymond Aron; the two were friends for almost half a century, and Fessard even baptized Aron's daughter. At a lecture in Rome, Aron said of Father Fessard: "If one recalls the series of positions he has taken, it is difficult not to admire his courage and his foresight."

Social ethics has an important place in Fessard's thought, but the essential focus is on history and historicity.
