= Mosque and Mausoleum of Imam al-Layth bin Sa'ad =

13th-century Islamic building in Cairo, Egypt

Mosque and Mausoleum of Imam al-Layth bin Sa'd
- Arabic: مسجد ومقام الإمام الليث بن سعد
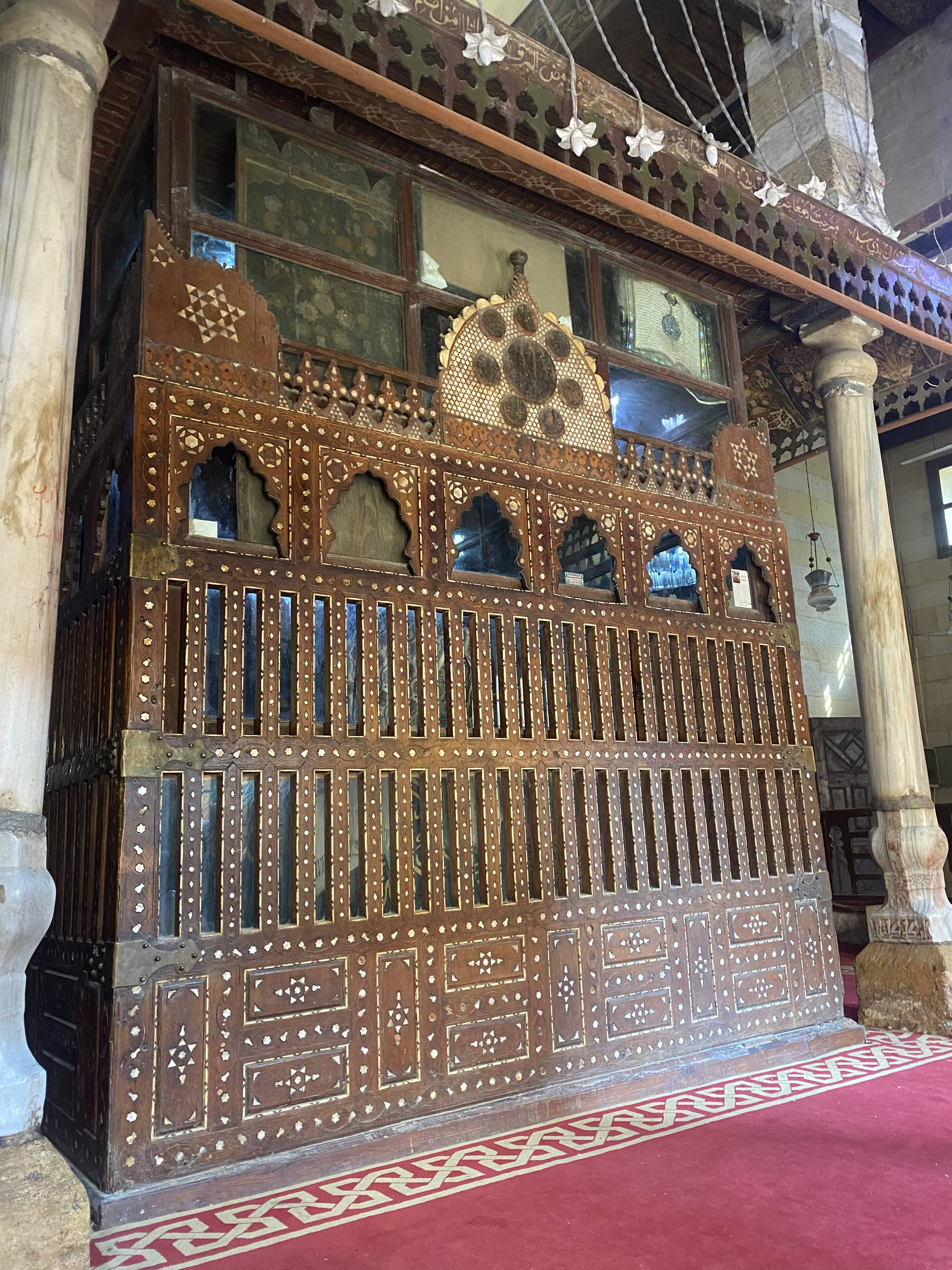
- Wooden enclosure surrounding the shrine of Imam al-Layth ibn Sa'd inlaid with mother of pearl

Religion
- Affiliation: Sunni Islam
- Ecclesiastical or organizational status: Mosque; Mausoleum

Location
- Location: Cairo
- Country: Egypt

Architecture
- Style: Islamic; Ayyubid; Mamluk
- Completed: 640 AH (1242/1243 CE)

Specifications
- Dome: One
- Minaret: One

The Mosque and Mausoleum of Imam al-Layth bin Sa‘ad (Arabic: مسجد ومقام الإمام الليث بن سعد, romanized: Masjid wa-maqām al-Imām al-Layth bin Saʿad) is a small Sunni Islam mosque and mausoleum dedicated to the Muslim jurist Imam Al-Layth bin Sa'ad, located in the southern portion of the City of the Dead (Cairo) of the Dead near to the Mausoleum of Imam al-Shafi'i, in Cairo, Egypt.

A shrine was first built in 640 AH (1242/1243 CE), four centuries after the death of Imam al-Layth in 791 CE, and has slowly expanded over time. Today the site functions as a regular mosque and sees a steady stream of visitors and pilgrims who come to pay their respects to Imam al-Layth.

== Name ==
The site is named after the Egyptian jurist and imam Imam al-Layth bin Sa‘d whose full title, according to his tombstone, was al-Layth bin Sa’ad bin Abd al-Rahman Abu al-Harith al-Misri the Mufti of the Egyptians. The site appears to have sat unnoticed for four centuries until it was successively patronised by Ayyubid, Mamluk, and Ottoman rulers and began to gain a name and reputation as a pilgrimage site.

== History ==
Imam al-Layth died in 175 AH (791/792 CE) and, according to Al-Maqrizi who provides most of the historical information that we have about the first few centuries in the development of the shrine, was buried with a simple gravestone at the far (southern) end of an area called the Pearl Domes, most likely referring to what is called today the Southern Cemetery (or in Arabic [al-qarāfa]). Al-Maqrizi claims that the first person to build some sort of significant structure around the grave was Abu Zayd al-Misri in 640 AH (1242/1243 CE). Unfortunately, no foundation inscription appears to have survived from the 13th century nor is it mentioned in any textual sources.

The reason for its construction may be clearer however if historical context is taken into account. Earlier in the Ayyubid period Salah al-Din sanctioned the construction of a mausoleum for Imam Al-Shafi'i under the auspices of the sheikh Najm al-Din al-Khabushani that would be finished in the early 13th century. This architectural project appears to be a special favour to al-Khabushani which he used the opportunity to promote the Ash'ari theological view as much as he sought to quietly purge that of the Isma'ili Fatimid dynasty. In this context, the decision to build a shrine around the Imam al-Layth is based on the Imam's symbolic importance as the founder of an Ash’ari/rationalist school of Islamic law. Based on the hoards of visitors to the shrine of Imam al-Shafi’i nearby the Ayyubid patrons would have assumed that the shrine of Imam al-Layth would also attract pilgrims.

This point of attracting pilgrims would continue to play importance into the Mamluk period where patronage of the site continued under three sultans; Qalawun, Faraj ibn Barquq, and Al-Mu'ayyad Shaykh, leaving the building with the majority of its medieval core that we see today apart from the four marble Ayyubid columns holding up the large dome. Al-Maqrizi's sources of information for the shrine suggests that literature was circulating in the Mamluk period that ascribed importance to the site as a pilgrimage destination. Contemporary to his own lifetime, al-Maqrizi also reports the various activities, for better or for worse, of the pilgrims who frequent the site:

يجتمع بهذا القبة في ليلة كلّ سبت جماعة من القرّاء، فيتلون القرآن الكريم تلاوة حسنة حتى يختسموا ختمة كاملة عند السحر، ويقصد المبيت عندهم للتبرّك بقراءة القرآن عدّة من الناس، ثم تفاحش الجمع، وأقبل النساء والأحداث والغوغاء، فصار أمرا منكرا، لا ينصتون لقراءة ولا يتعظون بمواعظ، بل يحدث منهم على القبور ما لا يجوز. ثم زادوا في التعدّي حتى حفروا ما هنالك خارج القبة من القبور، وبنوا مباني اتخذوها مراحيض وسقايات ماء

Every Saturday evening a group of Quran readers gather at the dome chamber to recite the Quran in full late into the night. Some people seek blessings by staying overnight and reading the Quran. Many people behave obscenely, take an interest in the women, the young men, and the general riffraff making the whole thing objectionable. They don't listen to the Quran nor take heed of the sermons but do things at the domes that aren't permissible. Their excesses became more frequent to the extent that they dug around some of the domes and built structures to be used as toilets and water fountains.

In the early 18th century there seems to have been a revival of interest in the shrine of Imam al-Layth. In 1726 the Ottoman amir Musa Jurbaji Mirza completed a renovation and decorative programme around the main shrine, and most likely commissioned the small collection of paintings in the smaller shrine of Imam al-Layth's son. Based on the style it is most likely that the amir added the wooden enclosure inlaid with mother of pearl and according to the inscriptions we know that he was the patron of the expansive paintings underneath the canopy of the enclosure, the rim of the dome's square base, and the Quranic inscriptions along the stone wall on the western wall opposite the shrine.

== Architecture ==
=== Layout ===
What remains of the medieval core of the building appears to be mostly Ayyubid and Mamluk in origin. Entrance to the site is from the north by a large stone portal flanked by two mastabas and a square-cut door. Inside is a long straight room with a high wooden beamed ceiling where today the southern wall has been knocked down to make room for a larger prayer space. The medieval core is made mostly of ashlar.

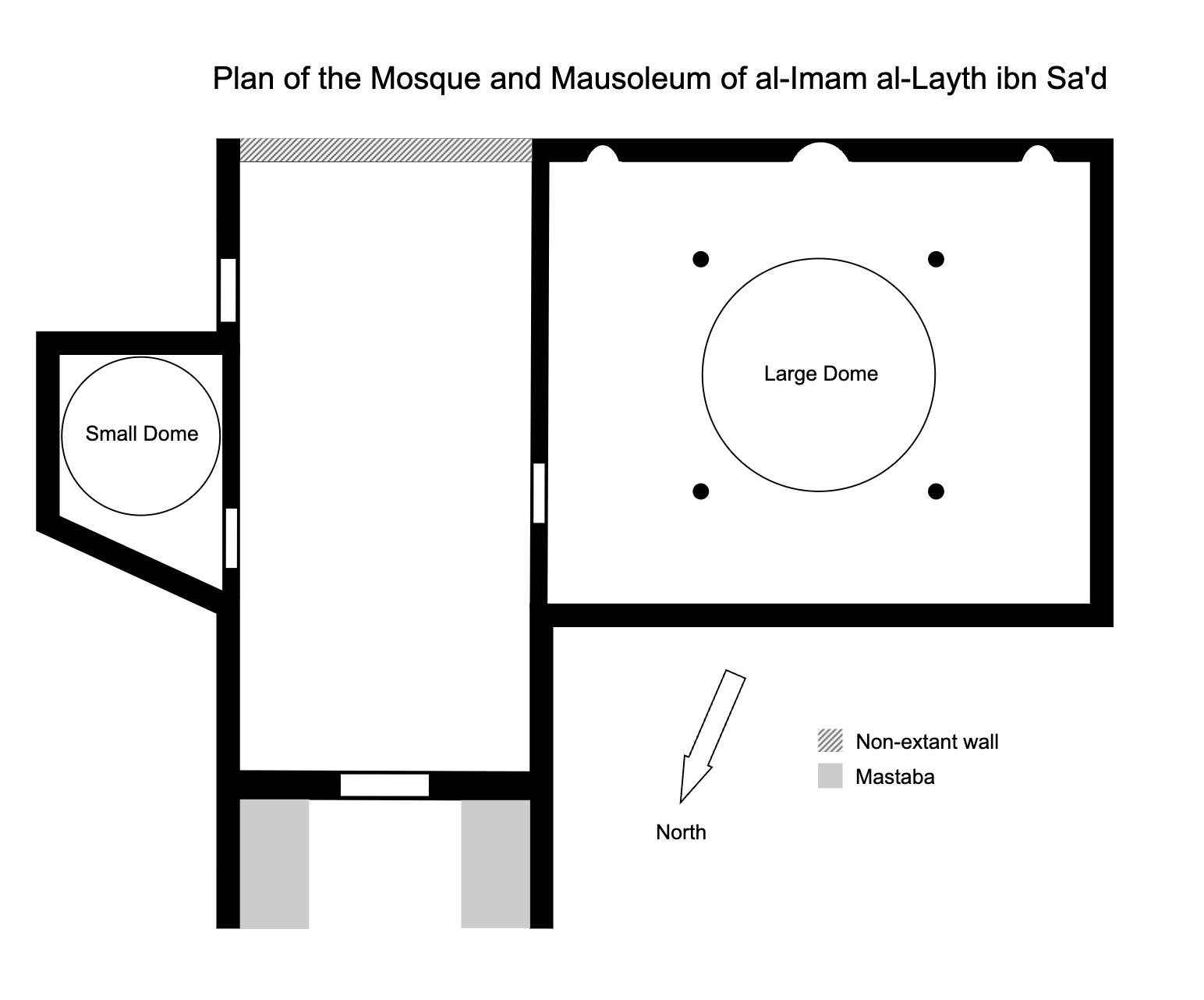
An approximate plan of the medieval core of the mosque and mausoleum. Not to scale

To the west is a small opening that leads one step down into the main mausoleum. This room is square and is dominated in the centre by the shrine of the Imam inside, an elaborately decorated wooden enclosure under a large dome supported by four marble columns. On the south are three mihrabs of which the central only exists as a single layer of stone from the original wall that was knocked through to make a larger prayer space today. The two mihrabs to the left and right are intact both with engaged columns and arches whose stones are painted alternately red and white.

To the east is a small domed room containing another, smaller, shrine. The northern wall is neither perpendicular nor parallel to the remainder of the original medieval structure and is made of red brick with supporting wooden beams providing some hints about the original layout of the Ayyubid building. The room contains an ancient slab of stone inscribed in Kufic most likely dating from the Ayyubid period whilst the walls bear some beautiful paintings of plant life in the Ottoman style.

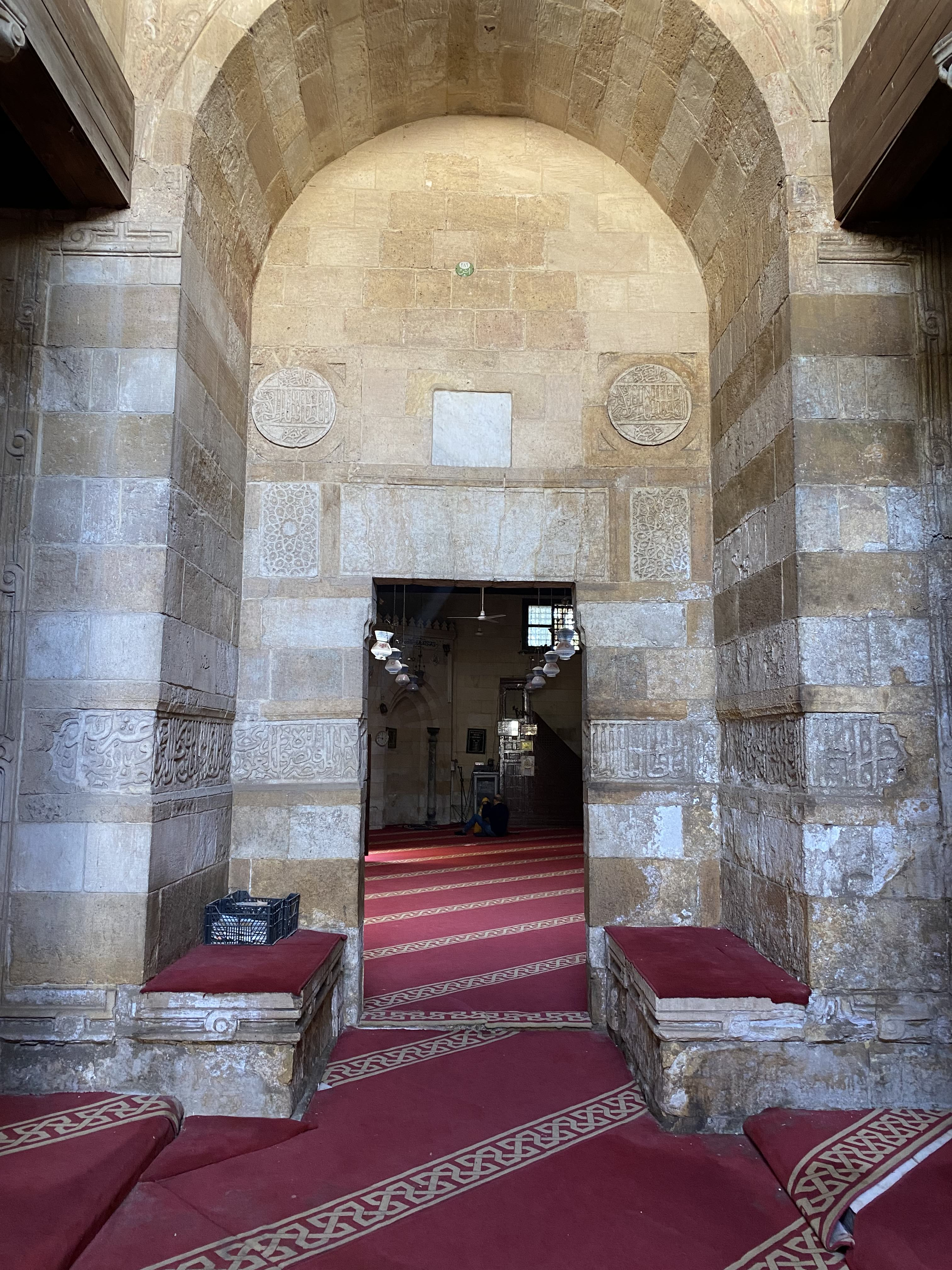
Main portal of Qansuh al-Ghawri dating from 1505 CE

=== Portal ===
At the entrance to the medieval core of the building is a grand portal made of large square-cut blocks of the yellow limestone that is characteristic of many of the pre-modern buildings around Cairo. The portal appears striped as alternate layers of stone are covered with a thin layer of plaster giving them a grainy white colour. Projecting out of either side of the door are two mastabas.

At head height is a horizontal band of inscription in the thuluth script from the reign of Qansuh al-Ghawri (1501-1516) that reads:

أمر بإنشاء هذا الباب الشريف من فضل الله تعالى سيدنا ومولانا وملك رقابنا السلطان المالك الملك الأشرف أبو النصر قانصوه الغورى عز نصره وكان الفراغ من هذا المكان في مستهل رجب الفرد سنة إحدى عشرة وتسعمائة.

Through the grace of God the Sublime, our lord and master, dominant over us, the Sultan, the sovereign, al-Malik al-Ashraf Abu al-Nasr Qansuh al-Ghawri, may his victory be glorified, ordered the construction of this noble portal. The completion of this edifice was at the beginning of Rajab al-Fard in 921 AH (1515/1516 CE).

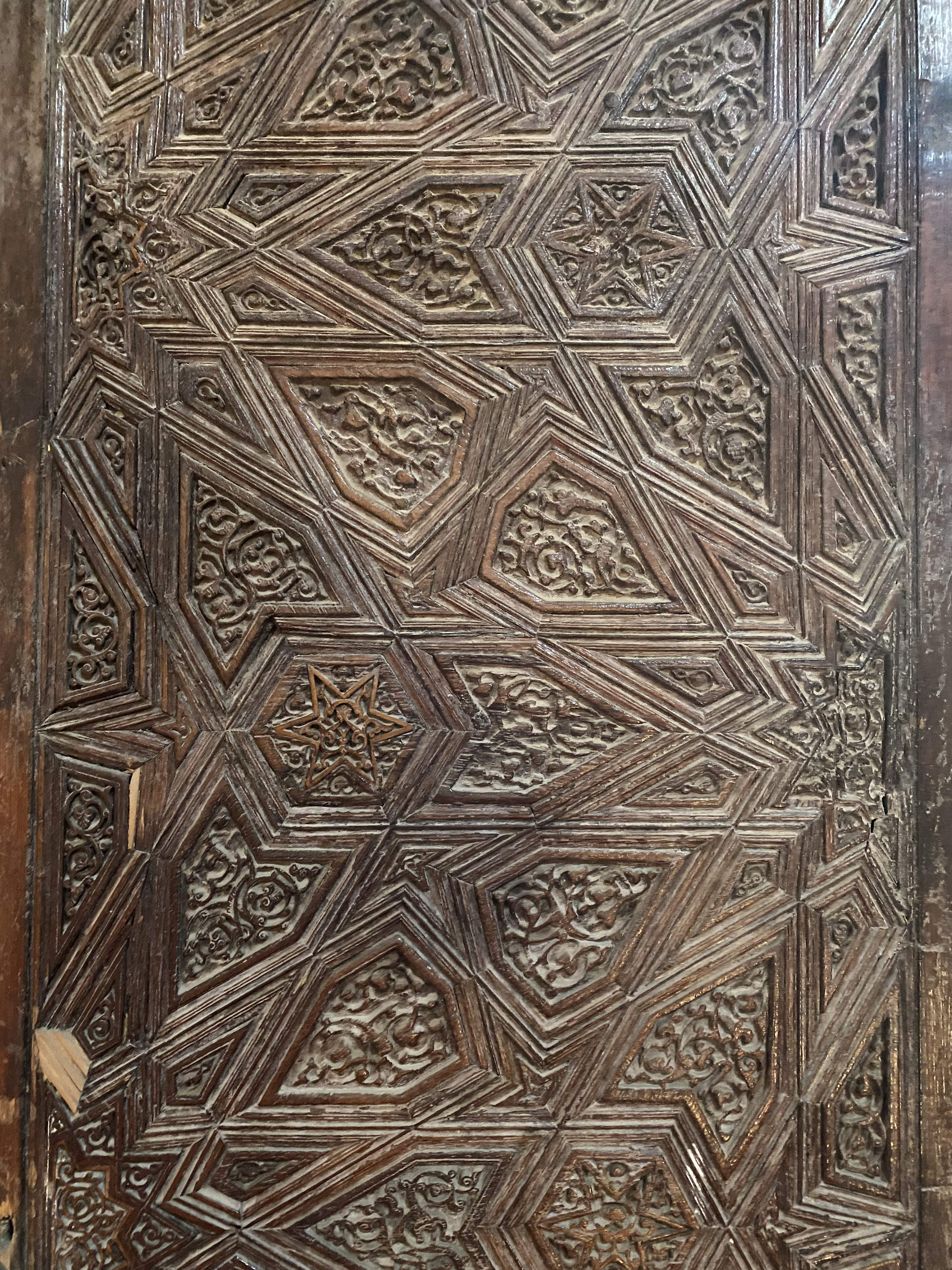
Wooden door currently at Imam al-Layth (originally from Imam al-Shafi'i)

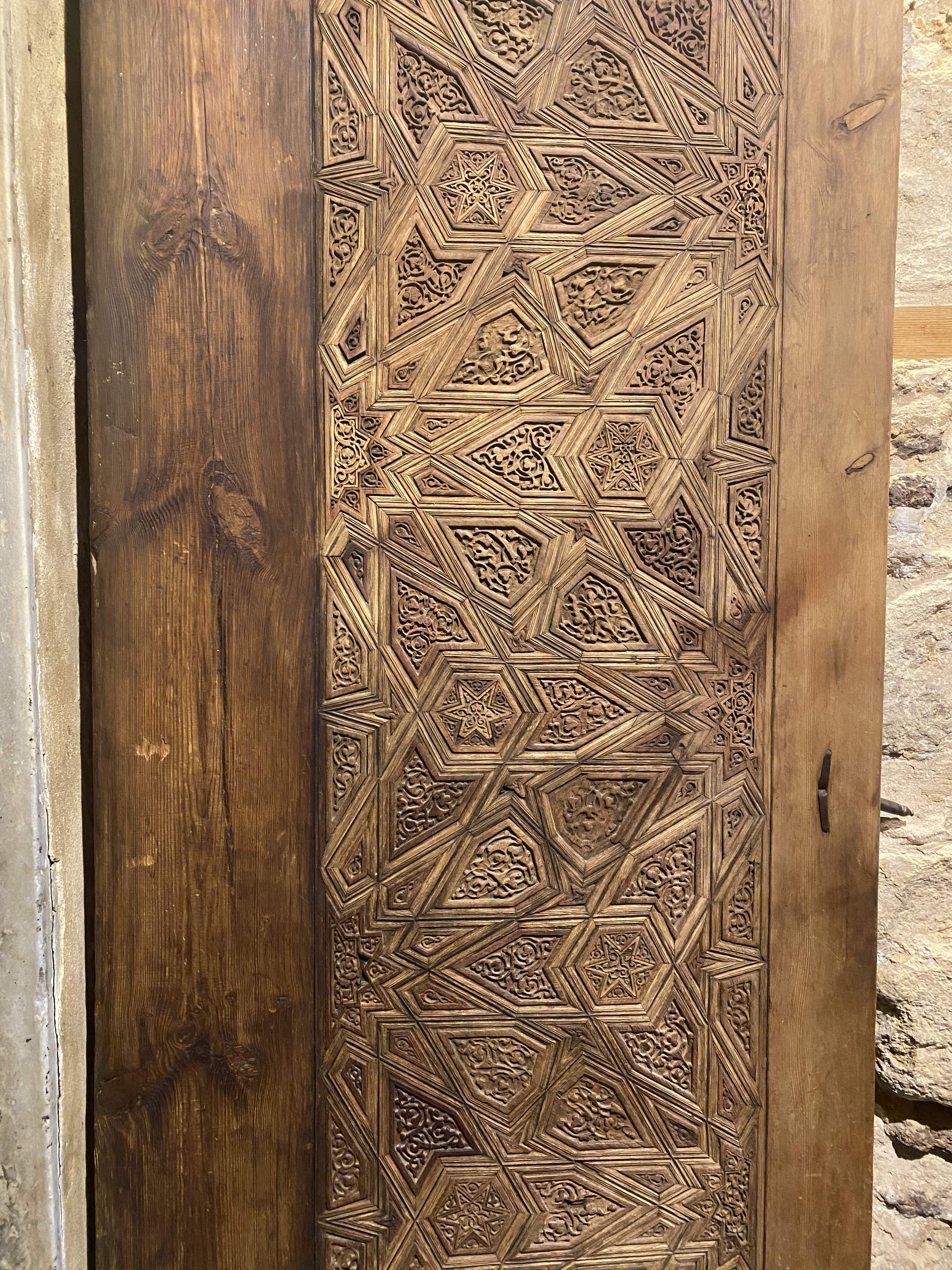
Wooden door at the Mausoleum of Imam al-Shafi'i

This inscription shows that the construction of the portal was one of the later Mamluk additions to the mausoleum. Qansuh al-Ghawri's patronage of the portal is reinforced by the placement of two identical epigraphic blazons just underneath the plain tympanum of the arch and adjacent to the left and right walls which read “the sultan al-Malik al-Ashraf Qansuh al-Ghawri may his victory be glorified”. Under each roundel is a rectangular stucco panel that plays with an intricate geometric pattern based on a dodecagon characteristic of the complexity of late Mamluk geometric decoration.

The lintel above the doorway appears as a white façade of seven blocks of stone locked into place by a joggled voussoir. Meanwhile, the top of the doorway itself is embellished by a simple double-tiered muqarnas pattern. On the interior of the portal is a magnificently carved wooden double door (upper image) that plays with a complex geometric pattern of a dodecagon to create a variety of shapes (arrows, hexagons, triangles) that are filled with arabesque carvings. The design is identical to a double door at the nearby mausoleum of Imam al-Shafi’i (lower image) that is the second (inner) of a double set of doors at the entrance to the mausoleum. The inscription spread across the four rectangular panels at the top and bottom of the Imam al-Layth door confirm its provenance from Imam al-Shafi’i. It reads that “al-Shafi’i is the Imam of all the people” and that the door was completed in 608 AH (1211/1212 CE) roughly thirty years before the foundation of the mausoleum of Imam al-Layth. In fact, the exact same inscription exists on the aforementioned door at the Mausoleum Imam al-Shafi’i suggesting that the door moved to Imam al-Layth was the first (outer) one.

=== Dome ===
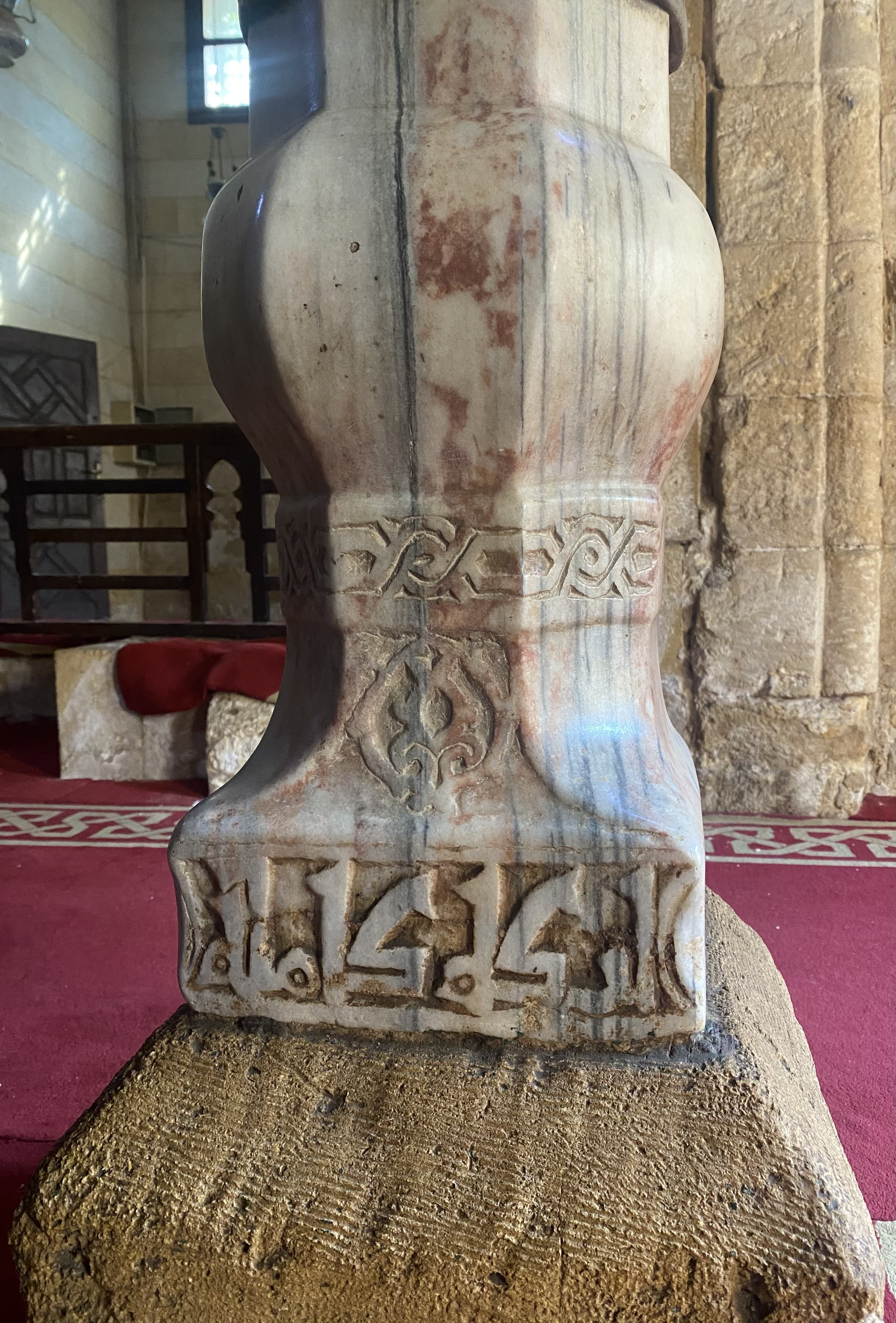
SE column of the dome with Kufic inscription reading "baraka kāmila [complete blessings]"

Above the main shrine of Imam al-Layth is a lofty dome that stands on four slim marble columns arranged as the four vertices of a square space containing the wooden structure of the shrine. Each column stands on a bevelled limestone pedestal above which the plinth is inscribed with short supplications in plain Kufic script that read:

Column	Arabic Inscription	English Translation
SW (lower) NE (upper) NW (lower) SE none	بركة كاملة نعمة شاملة	Complete blessings Complete goodness

The fact that these columns are carved in the Kufic script is an indication that they originate from the Ayyubid era as Kufic largely went out of fashion in the Mamluk period and naskh or thuluth took its place. The base of the marble column has a bevelled octagonal shape around which wraps a band of interlacing geometric patterns. Above the band is a bulbous area which leads into the main column that is cylindrical in shape. The roof of the wooden enclosure is supported by the marble columns but a stacked stone pillar takes the height of the column up to the square base of the pendentive dome.

Around the four interior sides of the base of the dome are four painted wooden panels dating from the renovations of Musa Jurbaji Mirza in 1726 that read “in the name of God the most Compassionate the most Merciful [Quran] the most Great spoke the Truth as did His Prophet. May God pray for Muhammad, his family and his companions and grant them salvation.” This verse above the resting place of a revered and pious individual is standard in that its themes match the quest for deliverance and mercy of he who lies below. Above the panels the zone of transition begins almost immediately in the four squinches that feature a tiered muqarnas pattern. The space between each squinch contains a stacked arch window grill that allows light to pass into the chamber below. Above the squinches sits the drum of the dome punctuated by eight arched windows which leads into the simple but elegant pointed dome sporting a stacked copper finial.

The smaller dome on the eastern wall of the site stands above the shrine of Shuʿayb ibn al-Imam al-Layth, the son of Imam al-Layth, and features a simple zone of transition made up of two tiers of muqarnas in each corner with four windows. The drum features sixteen windows of which eight are alternately filled in. The dome itself is plain and is crested with a simple finial. The northern wall of the room is different from the rest of the structure because it is made of red brick and mortar fixed by wooden beams. Furthermore, it doesn't appear aligned with the rest of the building.

=== Main shrine ===
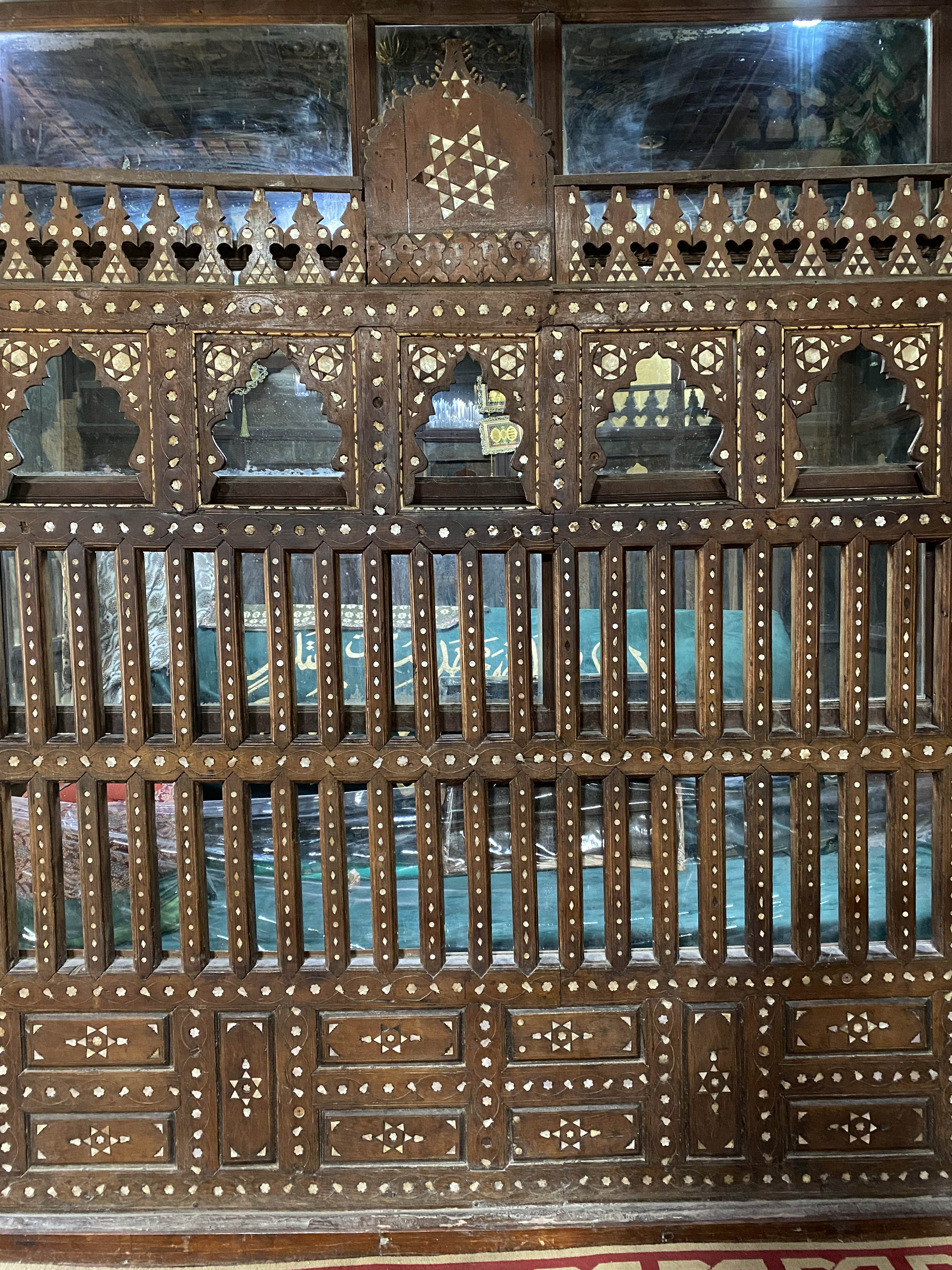
Wooden enclosure of the shrine

The enclosure that houses the tomb of Imam al-Layth itself is an incredibly elaborate wooden structure inlaid with mother of pearl. Based on the various inscriptions that adorn the wooden panels the structure appears to have been built in the early 18th century under the patronage of the Amir Musa Jurbaji. The lowest section of the enclosure wall features a pattern of alternating vertical and horizontal panels each embedded with a triangular star pattern around which flow floral mother of pearl inlay. Above are two rows of window grills and then a row of wider arches windows. The top of the enclosure wall is adorned with a row of crenelations.

The enclosure has an overhanging canopy with a crenelated border painted green and burgundy. Above the dagger board along the external fascia around the entire enclosure inscribed Qasidat Al-Burda is painted white. The poem is a 13th-century ode in praise of the Prophet Muhammad written by the Egyptian Sufi mystic Al-Busiri who was of the Shādhilī order. The internal fascia is painted with Quranic verses whilst the beams that support the central ceiling of the cenotaph are painted with another poem, this time a panegyric in praise of Imam al-Layth dating from 1138 AH (1725-6 AD).

=== Paintings ===
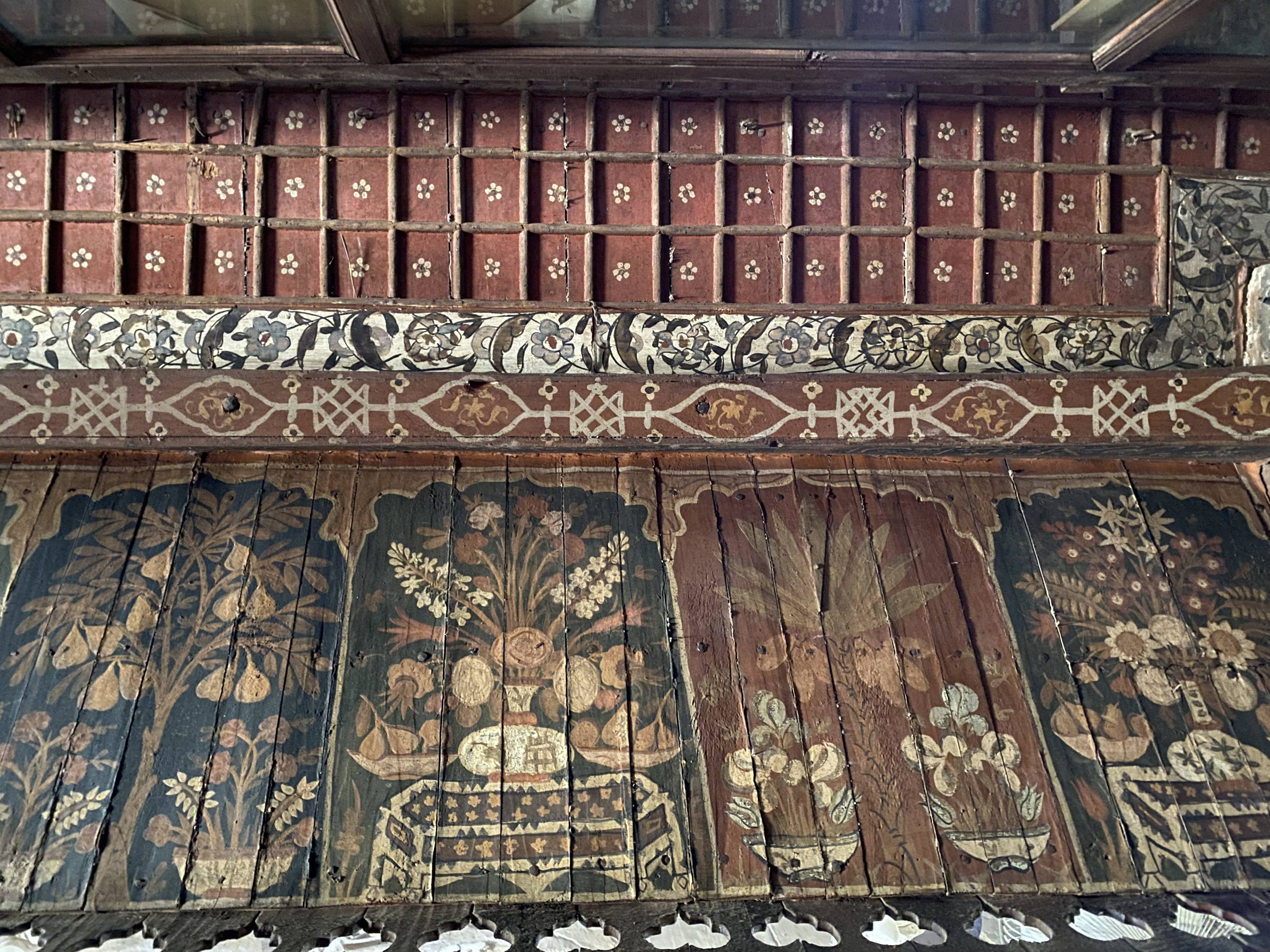
Painted canopy of wooden enclosure of shrine of Imam al-Layth bin Sa'ad

The ceiling of the canopy that hangs over the cenotaph of Imam al-Layth is decorated with beautiful Ottoman paintings of plant life. The overhang itself features a row of rectangular panels each of which contains a depiction of a fruit tree, or bouquet of flowers, or a palm tree bursting with dates. Its upper border features a white and yellow painted continuous geometric pattern whilst the adjacent border on the roof itself features a repeated flower pattern in blues and greens on a white background. The roof is a grid of dainty white flowers on a chalky red background.

Such Ottoman paintings are also visible on the plaster wall of the small shrine. Hidden underneath a band of painted Quranic inscription is a typical Ottoman motif of a plant arrangement in light grey with some red ornamentation flanked by two cypress trees. On the opposite wall is a set of six rectangular panels that almost resemble book covers. They are a made up of a doubled green frame between which runs a curving floral pattern. The central panel consists of a small golden flower in each corner from which sprouts thin green stems coalescing around a central red circle. The style bears some resemblance to the informal wall paintings found on the upper floor of the Madrasa of Umm al-Sultan Sha'ban in Al-Darb al-Ahmar. With flaking plaster, the paintings aren't in great condition.

=== Quranic inscriptions ===
The western interior façade of the main chamber features a band of painted Ottoman Quranic inscription with a green and red painted crenelated border. The band features the first three verses from Surāt al-Insān which read as follows:

هَلْ أَتَىٰ عَلَى ٱلْإِنسَـٰنِ حِينٌۭ مِّنَ ٱلدَّهْرِ لَمْ يَكُن شَيْـًۭٔا مَّذْكُورًا

إِنَّا خَلَقْنَا ٱلْإِنسَـٰنَ مِن نُّطْفَةٍ أَمْشَاجٍۢ نَّبْتَلِيهِ فَجَعَلْنَـٰهُ سَمِيعًۢا بَصِيرًا

إِنَّا هَدَيْنَـٰهُ ٱلسَّبِيلَ إِمَّا شَاكِرًۭا وَإِمَّا كَفُورًا

Is there not a period of time when each human is nothing yet worth mentioning?

For indeed, We alone created humans from a drop of mixed fluids, in order to test them, so We made them hear and see.

We already showed them the Way, whether they choose to be grateful or ungrateful.

The fact that the style of calligraphy, the colour scheme, and semantic themes of the verses match those of the paintings on the wooden enclosure of the cenotaph suggest that this inscription is part of the decorative project that Amir Musa Jurbaji patronised in the early 18th century AD. Similar are the painted inscriptions above the two intact mihrabs to the left and right of the central mihrab. The verse to the right features the beginning of the Quranic verse 33:23 which mentions believers who have fulfilled their pledge to God and the rewards they will receive, fitting in well with the themes of reverence associated to Imam al-Layth through the architecture of the mausoleum. The painting to the left speaks about how God has spoken the truth which was disseminated by the Prophet.

=== Doorways ===
There are doorways of significance on the site, two internal and one external, that date from the Mamluk period. Both the internal doorways feature a tight scroll in the final stone block just under the head of the frame. Above all the lintels are small windows cut right through the thick walls. The lintels themselves all have highly stylised naskh calligraphic inscriptions that provide interesting information about the Mamluk period and the various renovation projects that took place during that era and the motives for its patronage.

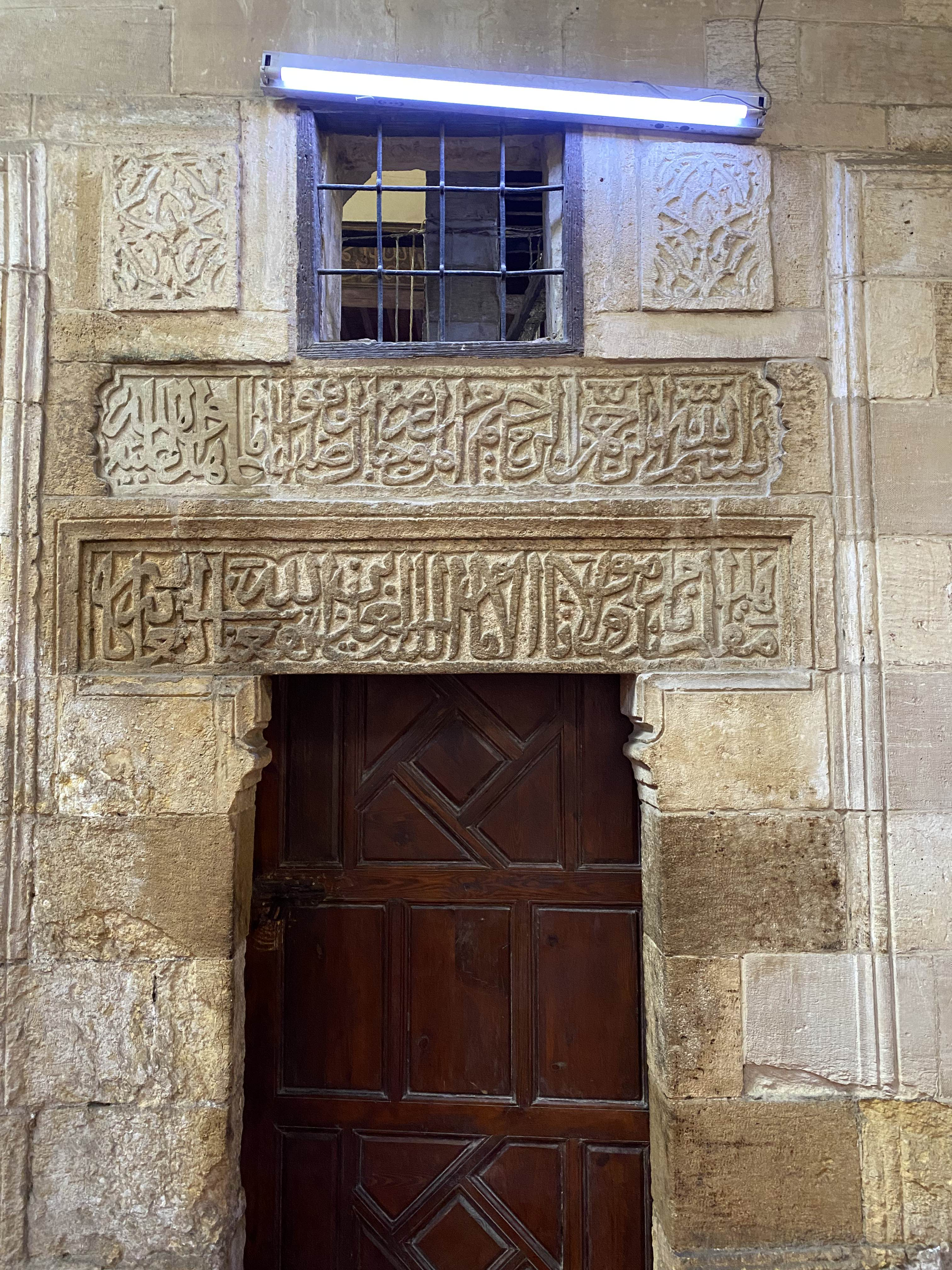
Entrance to the main shrine of Imam al-Layth ibn Sa'ad

Above the doorway to the main shrine of Imam al-Layth are two rows of calligraphy. The first includes Quran 33:23 which is the same verse that the Amir Musa Jurbaji later had painted above the small mihrab to the right of the main central one. The top left section of the upper line shows evidence of a recent reconstruction. The second line welcomes the visitor to the shrine: “This is the shrine of our master and lord Imam al-Layth bin Saʿad, may God the Sublime benefit us with his blessings.” This section may give us a hint about the use of the shrine in the Mamluk era as a destination of Sufi gatherings whereby people sought the blessings of the Imam.

Opposite is the doorway to the second, smaller shrine that sits under the small dome. Its inscription reveals that it is the resting place of Imam al-Layth's son Shuʿayb whose blessings are also sought by frequenters of the site.

The third lintel is on the exterior of the original medieval structure and has for the most part been reconstructed in comparison to the right-hand side which shows signs of serious damage. It includes the renovation inscription of the Sultan Muhammad al-Zahir who completed the works in 811 AH (1408 AD). The lintel is bordered by a swirling floriated pattern that also frames the window higher up. There appears to be evidence of earlier paintings in green and red that has now been lost due the location's exposure to the weather. A band of calligraphy with an intricate floriated background also straddles the doorway much of which has been lost.

=== Minaret ===
The current minaret stands separate from the core building to the south west and dates from the year 1479. Doris Behrens-Abouseif has suggested that the minaret may once have been attached to another structure belonging to the mosque. The inscription just below the first balcony reveals that the minaret was constructed under the patronage of Sultan Qaitbay's dawadar (Great Secretary) Yashbak min Mahdy. To date there exists no evidence to confirm or deny the existence of an earlier minaret connected to the mausoleum complex. The Mamluk minaret consists of two tiers. The first shaft is a stout octagonal shape made of plain ashlar stone featuring the foundation inscription and four arched windows alternating with decorative medallions. This leads into the first balcony which appears as a double carved band decorated with arabesque. The second part of the minaret is cylindrical and decorated with a simple geometric pattern based on a hexagram. The top of the cylinder widens into a standard Mamluk muqarnas that would have formed the base of the third, but no longer extant, shaft.

=== Tombstones ===
The shrine contains two gravestones, both loose from their respective graves, that shed some light on the importance accorded to Imam al-Layth and his burial place. The first one is located in the corner of the small shrine and the bottom right corner is partially missing. It is written in the Kufic script and displays the Āyat al-Kursī and Sūrat Al-Ikhlas. Based on the script it could be from the Ayyubid period.

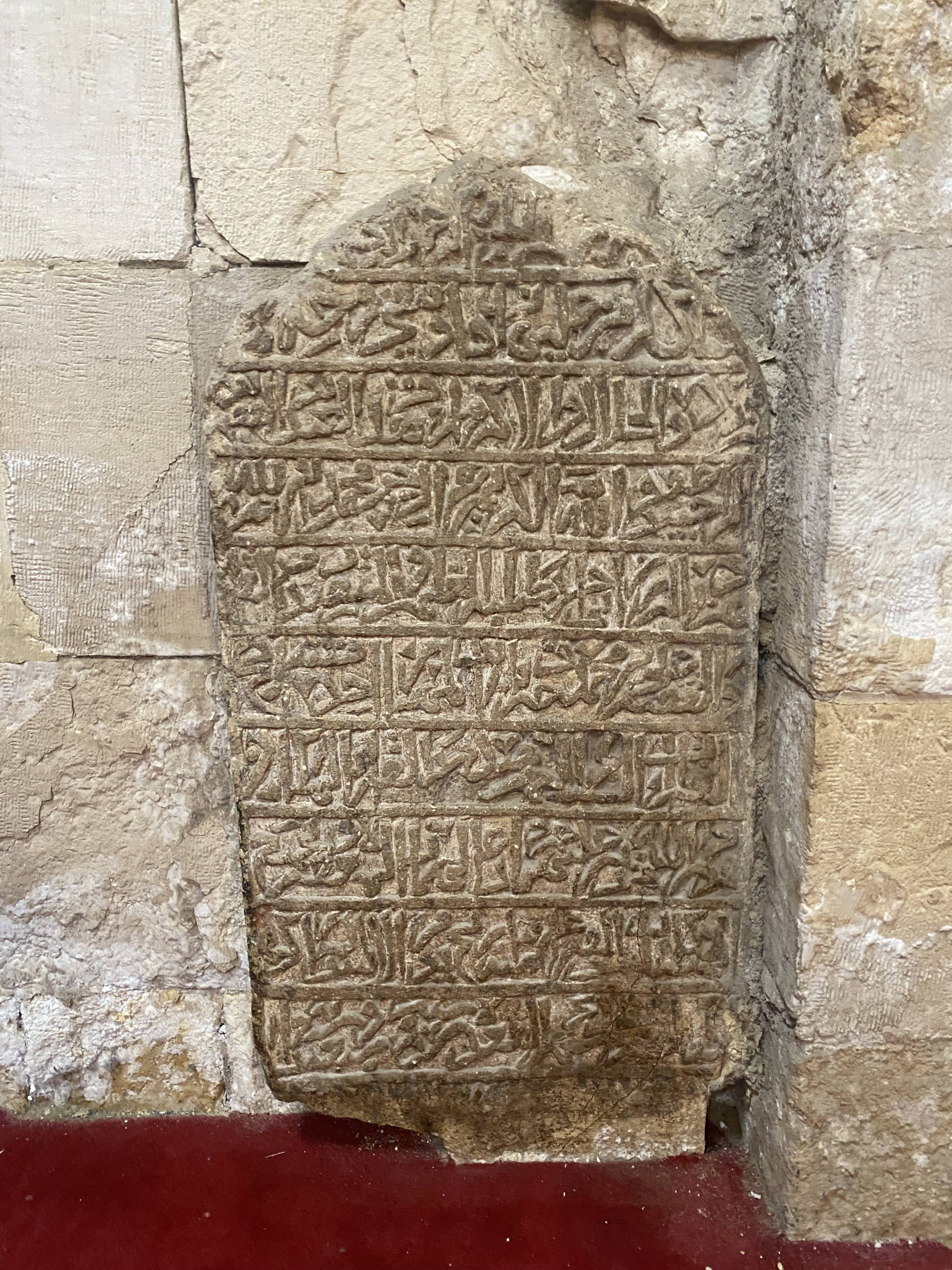
Mamluk tombstone written in thulth script

The second gravestone dates from the Mamluk era based on the naskh calligraphy and the date mentioned in the inscription from 776 AH (1375 AD). It includes the names of two students of Imam al-Layth and their commitment to learning providing an insight into how disciples of the Imam wished to be buried near their master. The inscription reads as follows:

بسم الله الرحمن الرحيم

كل من عليها فانٍ ويبقى وجه ربك

ذو الجلال والإكرام هذا قبر العبدين الفقيرين

الراجين عفو الله الكريم عبد الرحمن بن محمد بن عبدالله

عرف بالزرزارى أحد طلبة العلم والمتصدرين

والفقير على بن محمد عرف بابن المهتار أحد مشايخ

القراءات السبع..............

فرحم الله من ترحم عليهما ودعا لهما بالمغفرة ولجميع

المسلمين وكان الفراغ منه بتاريخ يوم الاثنين المبارك

الثالث عشر ذي القعدة سنة ست وسبعين وسبعمائة

In the name of God the most Compassionate the most Merciful

All that is in this world is ephemeral whilst the Face of Your Lord remains

In all its majesty and honour. This is the grave of two ascetic servants

Seeking the repentance of our Noble Lord; Abd al-Rahman ibn Muhammad ibn Abdallah

Known as al-Zarzari a student of ‘ilm and honourable leaders

And the ascetic Ali ibn Muhammad known as Ibn al-Muhtar one of the sheikhs

Of the seven readings.......

May God have mercy on those who wished mercy on them and prayed for their forgiveness

And for all Muslims. They departed this world on the blessed Tuesday of

The thirteenth of Dhu al-Qa’da in the year 776.

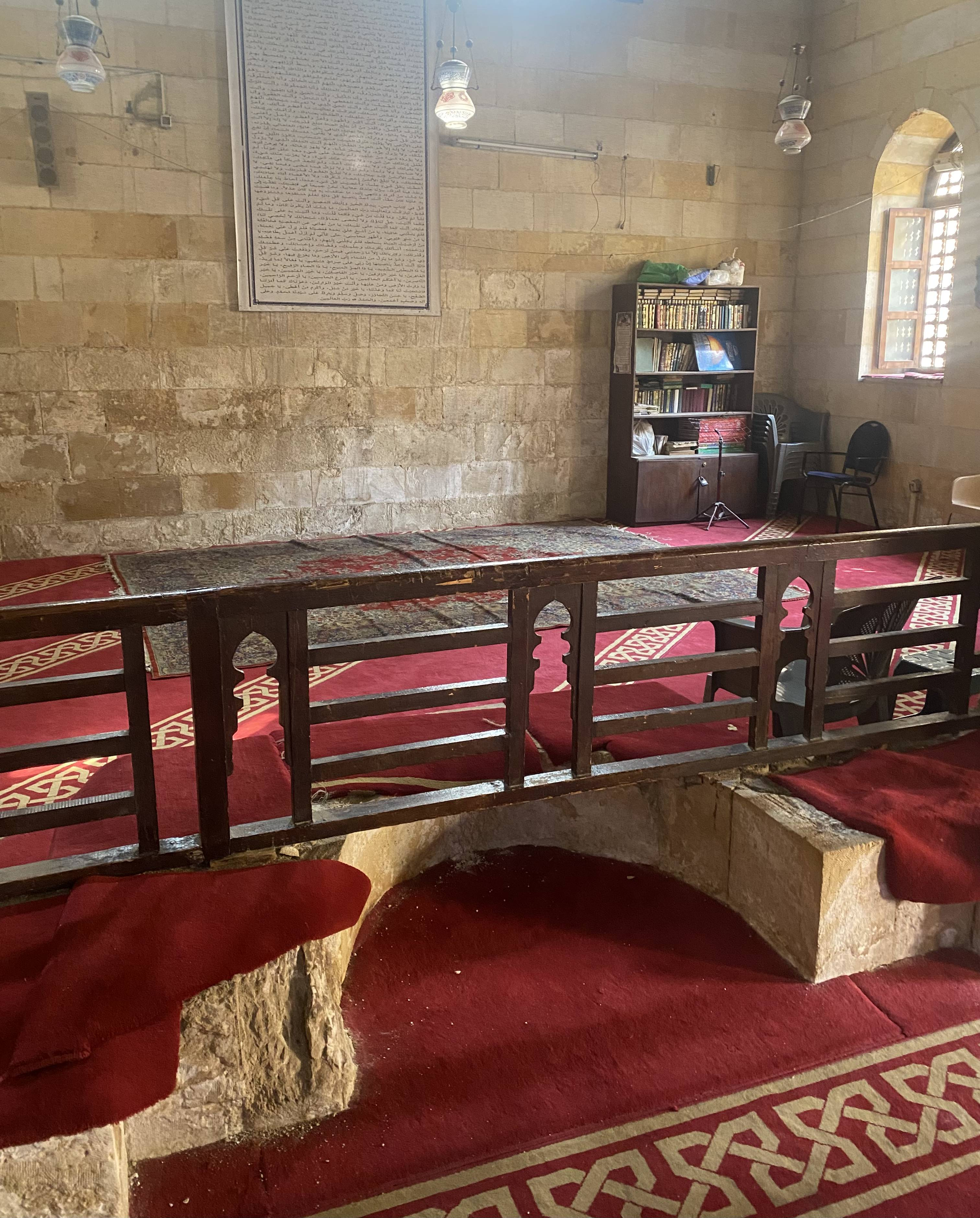
Remains of original mihrab in the mausoleum of Imam al-Layth bin Sa'ad

=== Modern extensions ===
Since the 19th century the mosque and mausoleum have been subject to some serious extensions and renovations. On all but the western side of the original structure the site has been expanded to include more expansive prayer spaces, a new mihrab to correct the qibla direction, and even the construction of an additional shrine to the west of Qansuh al-Ghawri's portal. The entrance hall leading up to the portal is now carpeted and flanked by two arcades of marble columns with a corrugated iron roof. A number of modern inscription plaques reveal the various stages of renovation and extension in the 20th century.

== Mosque and mausoleum today ==
Today the mosque sits in a quiet corner of the Southern Cemetery almost under the Civilisation Museum Bridge overpass that has severed the Southern Cemetery in two since the mid 2010s. It receives a slow, but steady stream of worshippers and visitors coming to pay their respects to the Imam al-Layth in a tranquil environment. The mosque management offers a free Egyptian breakfast to anyone who should need it.

== See also ==
- Islam in Egypt
- List of mausoleums in Egypt
- List of mosques in Egypt
