= Hadith of Jabir =

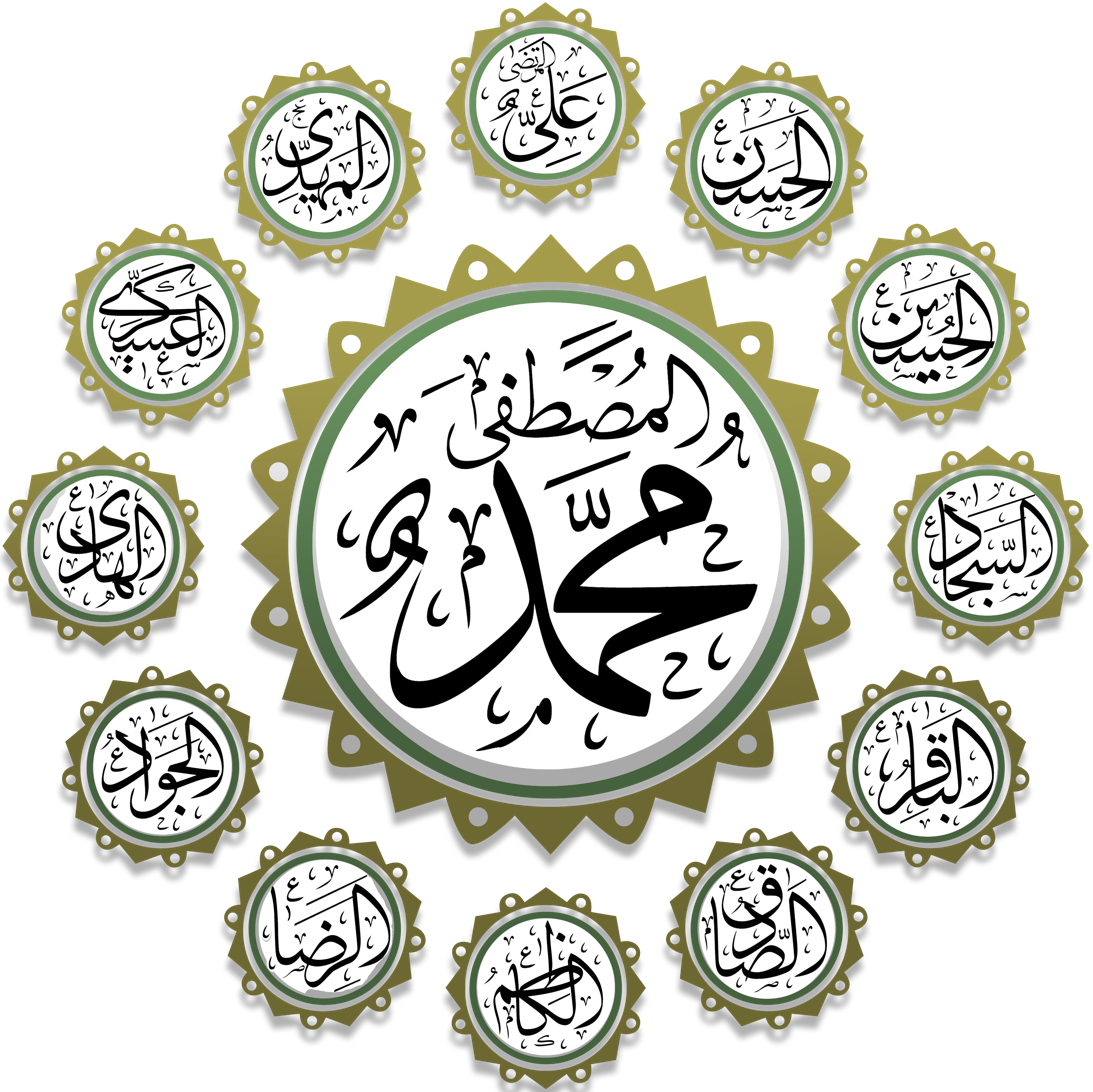
he Twelve Imams of Twelver Shia Islam whose names are mentioned in the Hadith of Jabir.

Jabir's hadith is a well-known narration in Shia sources that has been used to support and explain the Imamate of the Twelve Imams. This hadith is named after Jabir ibn Abdullah al-Ansari, a companion of the Islamic prophet. According to this narration, the Islamic prophet told Jabir the names of the Imams who would come after him and also mentioned Imam al-Mahdi, the last Imam.

== Text of the Hadith of Jabir ==
After the revelation of the Verse of Obedience, “O you who have believed, obey Allah and obey the Messenger and those in authority among you,” Jabir ibn Abdullah asked the Prophet: “O Messenger of Allah, we have known Allah and His Messenger, but who are those in authority whose obedience Allah has placed together with obedience to you?” The Prophet replied: “They are my successors and the leaders of the Muslims after me. The first of them is Ali ibn Abi Talib, then Hasan, Husayn, Ali ibn al-Husayn, Muhammad ibn Ali known as al-Baqir, Ja‘far ibn Muhammad, Musa ibn Ja‘far, Ali ibn Musa, Muhammad ibn Ali, Ali ibn Muhammad, Hasan ibn Ali, and then the one who has the same name and kunyah as me, the Proof of Allah on earth and the son of Hasan ibn Ali.” The Prophet said that he would be hidden from his Shi‘ites, and his Shi‘ites would benefit from him during his absence, just as people benefit from the sun when clouds cover it.

== Chain of transmission of the Hadith of Jabir ==
This hadith was narrated by different people. In Usul al-Kafi, al-Kulayni mentioned three narrations of this hadith:

The first narration is from Muhammad ibn Yahya, from Abdullah ibn Ja‘far, from al-Hasan ibn Zarif, from Bakr ibn Salih, from Abd al-Rahman ibn Salim, from Abu Basir, from Abu Abdullah (peace be upon him). The second narration is from Muhammad ibn Abdullah, from Abdullah ibn Ja‘far, from al-Hasan ibn Zarif, from Bakr ibn Salih, from Abd al-Rahman ibn Salim, from Abu Basir, from Abu Abdullah (peace be upon him). The third narration is from Ali ibn Muhammad, from Salih ibn Abi Hammad, from Bakr ibn Salih, from Abd al-Rahman ibn Salim, from Abu Basir, from Abu Abdullah (peace be upon him). This hadith is also found in the Sunni books Sahih al-Bukhari and Sahih Muslim.

In Kamal al-Din wa Tamam al-Ni‘mah, Shaykh al-Saduq mentions the chain of narration of the Hadith of Jabir as follows: from Muhammad ibn Hammam, from Ja‘far ibn Muhammad ibn Malik al-Fazari, from Hasan ibn Muhammad ibn Sama‘ah, from Ahmad ibn al-Harith, from Mufaddal ibn Umar, from Yunus ibn Zabyan, from Jabir ibn Yazid al-Ju‘fi, from Jabir ibn Abdullah al-Ansari.

In the book Al-Du‘afa’ min Rijal al-Hadith by Husayn Sa‘edi, published in 1426 AH, the following is mentioned about some of these narrators:

- Ja‘far ibn Muhammad ibn Malik al-Fazari: Ja‘far ibn Muhammad ibn Malik was considered unreliable in transmitting hadiths and was accused of fabricating hadiths and having corrupt beliefs. Scholars such as Ibn Walid, Ibn Nuh, Shaykh al-Saduq, Ibn al-Ghada’iri, and al-Najashi considered him weak. However, Abu Ghalib considered him trustworthy, while al-Khusaibi and Abu al-Qasim al-Kufi praised him. The author also considers him among those who fabricated and invented hadiths and held extreme beliefs.
- Ahmad ibn al-Harith al-Anmati: He was among the companions of Mufaddal ibn Umar al-Ju‘fi and later followed the Waqifiyya.
- Yunus ibn Zabyan: He was described as someone who exaggerated in beliefs, was very weak, a liar, and who fabricated hadiths. Scholars such as al-Ayyashi, al-Fadl ibn Shadhan, al-Kashshi, Ibn al-Ghada’iri, al-Najashi, al-Allamah, Ibn Dawud, al-Jaza’iri, Muhammad Taha Najaf, and al-Bahbudi considered him weak.

== See also ==
- Hadith of the Twelve Successors
- Hadith of the thaqalayn
- Imamate in Shia doctrine
- Twelve Imams
- Occultation (Islam)
- Hadith al-Nujum
