= Najm al-Din al-Khabushani =

Shafi'i jurist (1116–1191)

Najm al-Din Abu'l-Barakat Muhammad ibn al-Muwaffaq ibn Sa'id ibn Ali ibn al-Hasan ibn Abdallah al-Khabushani was a Shafi'i jurist (faqih) of Persian origin who was active in Egypt.

According to Ibn Khallikan, he was born on 13 Rajab 510 AH (21 November 1116) in the environs of Khabushan (modern Quchan). He studied jurisprudence under Muhammad ibn Yahya al-Janzi. He settled in Fustat, Egypt, then ruled by the Isma'ili Shi'a Fatimid Caliphate. There he lived as an ascetic. When Saladin became vizier of the Fatimid Caliphate, Najm al-Din rose in his favour and became his close friend and advisor. He was among the chief proponents of a juridical opinion that urged Saladin to depose and even execute the last Fatimid caliph, al-Adid, on account of his heretical beliefs and those of his family.

On Najm al-Din's advice, Saladin opened a Shafi'i law college in the area of al-Qarafah, next to the tomb of the school's founder, al-Shafi'i. When the building was completed in 1176/7, Najm al-Din became the college's first director. His fame exceeded Egypt and reached even al-Andalus, as the Andalusi traveller Ibn Jubayr went to receive his blessing during his visit to Fustat. Najm al-Din died on 12 Dhu'l-Qa'dah 587 AH (1 December 1191) and was buried at the foot of the tomb of al-Shafi'i.

== Sources ==
- Ibn Khallikan (1843). Ibn Khallikan's Biographical Dictionary, Translated from the Arabic. Vol. II. Translated by Baron Mac Guckin de Slane. Paris: Oriental Translation Fund of Great Britain and Ireland. OCLC 832287342.
- Lev, Yaacov (1999). Saladin in Egypt. Leiden, Boston, Köln: Brill. ISBN 90-04-11221-9.
