= Hadith al-Nujum =

Hadith al-Aman, also known as the Hadith al-Nujum, is a narration attributed to the Prophet Muhammad. It describes his Ahl al-Bayt as a source of safety and protection for people, just as the stars are described as a source of safety for the people of the heavens. The hadith has been narrated in different forms in a number of Shia and Sunni hadith sources. Some versions also discuss the status of the Ahl al-Bayt and the Imams after the Prophet.

== Text of the hadith ==
قال رسول اللّه صلّى اللّه عليه وآله : « النجوم أمان لأهل السماء ، إذا ذهبت النجوم ذهب أهل السماء ، وأهل بيتي أمان لأمّتي فإذا ذهب أهل بيتي ذهب أهل الأرض »

The Prophet Muhammad said:

“The stars are a source of safety for the people of the heavens. When the stars disappear, the people of the heavens will also disappear, and my Ahl al-Bayt are a source of safety for my community. When my Ahl al-Bayt disappear, the people of the earth will also disappear.”

== Hadith al-Nujum in Islamic sources ==
=== Shia sources ===
In Shia sources, this hadith has been narrated in similar wording. Allama Majlisi cited several narrations with this meaning from the Prophet Muhammad in Bihar al-Anwar. These include narrations from Jabir ibn Abd Allah, Abu Musa al-Ashari, and Ibn Abbas, as well as a narration from Imam al-Rida, who quoted the Prophet through his forefathers.

In a narration from Muhammad al-Baqir, the Prophet Muhammad described his Ahl al-Bayt as a source of safety for the people of the earth and said that when his Ahl al-Bayt disappear, unpleasant things will befall the people of the earth. In the continuation of this narration, the Ahl al-Bayt are interpreted as the “Imams.”

Also, in a narration attributed to Ali ibn Abi Talib, the Prophet Muhammad describes his Ahl al-Bayt as a source of safety for the people of the earth. Majlisi also mentioned a narration with similar wording in the Musnad of Ahmad ibn Hanbal, as well as a narration by Muwaffaq ibn Ahmad al-Maliki from Ali ibn Abi Talib and Ibn Abbas.

In another narration cited by Allama Majlisi in Bihar al-Anwar, Imam Ja'far al-Sadiq described the Ahl al-Bayt as “a source of safety for the people of the earth,” just as the stars are “a source of safety for the people of the heavens.” In the continuation of this narration, the Ahl al-Bayt are described as God's proofs on earth, and it says that the earth is never without a proof from God.

Another narration of this hadith is from Abu Sa'id al-Khudri, in which the Prophet Muhammad described his Ahl al-Bayt as a source of safety for the people of the earth, just as the stars are a source of safety for the people of the heavens. In the continuation of the narration, the Prophet is asked about the Imams after him. In response, he says that there will be twelve Imams, nine of whom are descendants of Husayn ibn Ali:

«أهل بيتي أمان لأهل الأرض كما أن النجوم أمان لأهل السماء، قيل: يا رسول الله فالأئمة بعدك من أهل بيتك؟ قال: نعم، الأئمة بعدي اثنا عشر، تسعة من صلب الحسين، أمناء معصومون، ومنا مهدي هذه الأمة، ألا إنهم أهل بيتي وعترتي من لحمي ودمي، ما بال أقوام يؤذونني فيهم؟ لا أنالهم الله شفاعتي.»

“My Ahl al-Bayt are a source of safety for the people of the earth, just as the stars are a source of safety for the people of the heavens.” It was asked, “O Messenger of God, are the Imams after you from your Ahl al-Bayt?” He replied, “Yes. There are twelve Imams after me; nine of them are descendants of Husayn, who are trustworthy and infallible. The Mahdi of this community is also one of us.” “Know that they are my Ahl al-Bayt and my descendants, and they are from my flesh and blood.” “What is wrong with some people that they hurt me because of them? May God keep them from my intercession.”

=== Sunni sources ===
al-Hakim al-Nishapuri, in al-Mustadrak, narrated this hadith from Ibn Abbas:

قَالَ رَسُولُ اللَّهِ صَلَّى اللهُ عَلَيْهِ وَسَلَّمَ: «النُّجُومُ أَمَانٌ لِأَهْلِ الْأَرْضِ مِنَ الْغَرَقِ، وَأَهْلُ بَيْتِي أَمَانٌ لِأُمَّتِي مِنَ الِاخْتِلَافِ، فَإِذَا خَالَفَتْهَا قَبِيلَةٌ مِنَ الْعَرَبِ اخْتَلَفُوا فَصَارُوا حِزْبَ إِبْلِيسَ»

“The stars are a protection for the people of the earth from drowning, and my Ahl al-Bayt are a protection for my community from division. If a tribe of the Arabs opposes them, they will fall into division and become the party of Satan.”

al-Tabarani narrated a hadith from Salamah ibn al-Akwaʿ in which the Prophet Muhammad described his Ahl al-Bayt as a source of protection for his community.

== Interpretation of the hadith ==
In interpreting the hadith, Naser Makarem Shirazi refers to Quranic verses about the role of the stars in guiding people. These include the verse, “And by the stars they are guided” (Quran 16:16), and the verse, “And it is He who made the stars for you so that you may be guided by them in the darkness of the land and the sea” (Quran 6:97). He points to the role of the stars in keeping Satan away from the heavens and says this helps explain the meaning of “protection” in the hadith. He then compares the Prophet's Ahl al-Bayt to the stars, as they keep people away from misguidance and guide them to the right path, and stand against the efforts of Satan among the jinn and humans to distort the Quran and Sunnah. He considers the Ahl al-Bayt a shield for the community against division and says that if the division continues, people will fall into following Satan. He also understands from this hadith that the guidance of the Ahl al-Bayt will continue until the end of time.

According to Makarem, this hadith also shows that the Ahl al-Bayt are free from error and sin, because if they could make mistakes or commit sins, they could not be a complete protection for people from division and misguidance.

Makarem compares the Ahl al-Bayt to stars that appear one after another to guide people. For this point, he cites a statement by Ali ibn Abi Talib in Nahj al-Balagha:

«ألا أن مثل آل محمد صلى الله عليه و آله كمثل نجوم السماء إذا هوى‌ نجمٌ طلع نجمٌ»

“The example of the family of Muhammad is like the stars in the sky: when one star sets, another star rises.”

He also says that the Ahl al-Bayt in these narrations does not mean the Prophet's wives. According to him, they are the people who guide the community and save it from misguidance, and this role is not limited to a specific time.

== Narrators ==
The Hadith of al-Nujum was narrated from the Prophet Muhammad by at least seven narrators and companions: Ali ibn Abi Talib, Jabir ibn Abd Allah, Abu Sa'id al-Khudri, Anas ibn Malik, al-Munkadir, Salamah ibn al-Akwaʿ, and Ibn Abbas.

== See also ==
- Hadith of the Ark
- Hadith of the Cloak
- Hadith of Jabir
- Hadith of the Twelve Successors
- Hadith of the thaqalayn
- Ahl al-Bayt
