= Hadith of the ark =

Saying attributed to the Islamic prophet Muhammad

The hadith of the ark (Arabic: حدیث السفینة, romanized: ḥadīth al-safīna) is a saying (hadith) attributed to the Islamic prophet Muhammad that likens his household (Ahl al-Bayt) to Noah's ark; whoever turns to them is saved and whoever turns away from them perishes. Reported by both Shia and Sunni authorities, this hadith is of particular significance in Shia Islam, where the Ahl al-Bayt are viewed as the spiritual and political successors of Muhammad.

== Hadith of the ark ==
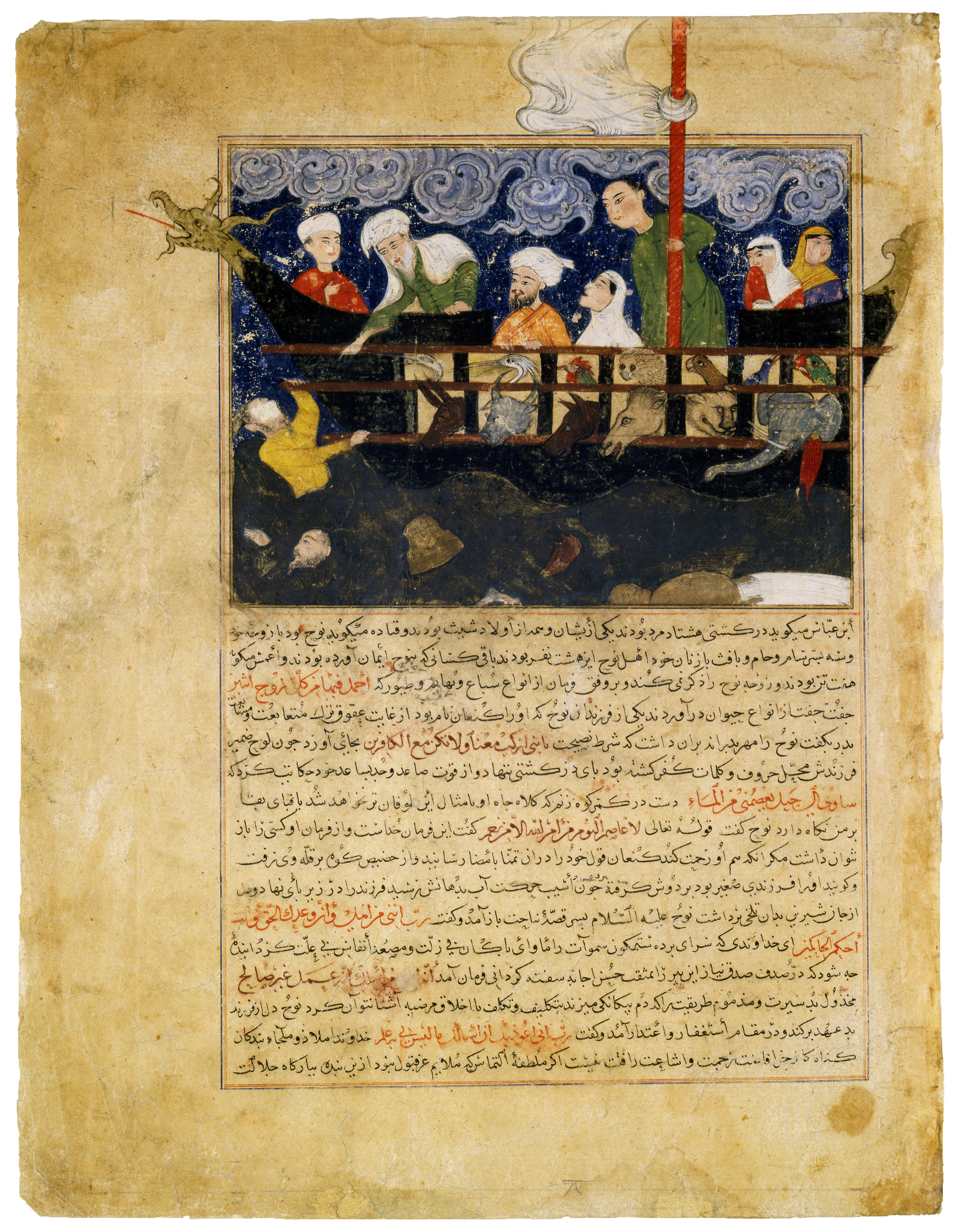
Noah's Ark, a miniature from Majma' al-tawarikh, authored by the Persian historian Hafiz-i Abru (d. 1430)

In the hadith compilation Ghayat al-maram, the Shia theologian al-Bahrani (d. c. 1695) cites eleven chains of transmission for the hadith of the ark from Sunni sources and seven from Shia sources. In particular, al-Mustadrak, a Sunni collection of prophetic traditions, includes the following version of the hadith,

Truly the people of my house (ahl bayti) in my community (umma) is like Noah's ark: Whoever takes refuge therein is saved and whoever opposes it is drowned.

Minor variations of this statement appear also in the works of the Sunni scholars Ibn Hajar (d. 1449), Ibn Abd-Allah al-Tabari (d. 1295), al-Suyuti (d. 1505), and al-Shablanji (nineteenth century), while the modern Shia theologian Muhammad Husayn Tabatabai (d. 1981) narrates this hadith on the authority of Muhammad's cousin, Ibn Abbas. Shia Islam limits the Ahl al-Bayt to the Ahl al-Kisa, namely, Muhammad, his daughter Fatima, her husband Ali, and their two sons, Hasan and Husayn. There are various interpretations in Sunni Islam, though a typical compromise is to also include Muhammad's wives in the Ahl al-Bayt. A related prophetic hadith likens the Ahl al-Bayt to celestial objects, "As the stars in the sky are the source of guidance for the travelers, the Ahl al-Bayt are the source of guidance for the people," although a Sunni variant of this latter hadith replaces the Ahl al-Bayt with the companions of Muhammad.

== Significance in Shia Islam ==
For the Shia cleric Ja'far Sobhani, the hadith of the ark suggests that the leadership of the Muslim community is not an issue to be settled by the Muslims themselves. Rather, the divine leadership of the Muslim community rests with the Ahl al-Bayt whose guidance is the only refuge from "delusion and confusion." He also views this hadith as evidence of the infallibility of the Ahl al-Bayt, lest their followers are led astray. Tabatabai similarly cites this and similar hadiths to highlight the significance of the Ahl al-Bayt in Islam.

The Islamic author Reza Shah-Kazemi cites verse 29:64 of the Quran, "the abode of hereafter—that is the true life, if only they knew," to argue that being saved in the hadith of the ark refers to eternal salvation, namely, entering the paradise in the hereafter and everything in this world that contributes to that outcome. In particular, he contends, being saved does not mean being spared the trials and afflictions of this world; it instead means being granted the capacity to endure these trials and afflictions. He thus concludes that the saving ark in this hadith is piety (zuhd), which can be achieved by following the teachings of the Ahl al-Bayt. Zuhd, he adds, shields us from anxiety, misery, and terror when we are inevitably hit by the calamities of this world.

== See also ==
- Hadith of the thaqalayn
- Hadith of Golden Chain
- Hadith of the warning
- Hadith al-Nujum
- Ghadir Khumm
