= Muhammad ibn Yahya al-Janzi =

Shafi'i scholar (1083–1154)

Muhammad Ibn Yahya al-Janzi

Personal life
- Born: 476H/1083 AD
- Died: 549H/1154 AD
- Era: Islamic Golden Age
- Region: Persia
- Main interest: Fiqh

Religious life
- Religion: Islam
- Jurisprudence: Shafi'i
- Creed: Ash'ari

Muslim leader
- Influenced by: Al-Ghazali
- Influenced: Ibn al-Sam'ani

Muhammad Ibn Yahya al-Janzi (Arabic: محمد بن يحيى الجنزي) was a Persian scholar, who was born in Nishapur. He was a student of Al-Ghazali and was responsible for spreading his teachings of Shafite Law in Nishapur.

== Biography ==
Muhammad Ibn Yahya al-Janzi was an Imam, Mufti, and Shafite Scholar. Just like al-Ghazali, he also had expertise in debates and silencing one's opponents.

During his lifetime, he became an esteemed scholar & was appointed as a head teacher in Nizamiyya The famous historian Ibn al-Sam'ani also studied under him. Imam Fakhar-ud-din al-Razi is linked with al-Ghazali through Abu Nasr Ahmad ibn Zirr ibn Aqil al-Kamal al-Simnani (d. 575), who was also the student of Yahya al-Janzi.

== Works ==
Just like al-Nawawi wrote a commentary, of a commentary (written by his teacher Ibn al-Salah), of al-Ghazali's "al-Wasit Fil Madhab" titled "Rawdat al-Talibin" & al-Rafi wrote "al-Fath al-azeez fi sharh al-Wajiz", Yahya al-Janzi also wrote a commentary titled "al-Muhit fi Sharh al-Wasit".

He said about al-Ghazali:

He is the second al-Shafi.

== Students ==
Amongst the famous students of Yahya al-Janzi were:

- Ibn al-Sam'ani
- Abu Mansur Muhammad Ibn Muhammad al-Tusi (d. 567)
- Abu Fath Muhammad Ibn Mahmud al-Tusi (d. 596)
- Abu Nasr Ahmad ibn Zirr ibn Aqil al-Kamal al-Simnani
- Najm al-Din al-Khabushani

== Death ==
Yahya al-Janzi died in 549H/1154 AD in Nishapur.

== See also ==
- List of Ash'aris and Maturidis
