= Ahmad ibn Muhammad ibn al-Sari Ibn al-Salah =

Najm al-Dīn Abū al-Futūḥ Aḥmad ibn Muḥammad ibn al-Sarī, called Ibn al-Ṣalāḥ (died 1154), was a scholar who wrote critical commentaries on logic and mathematics. In total at least 17 works by Ibn al-Ṣalāh are extant today.

Ibn al-Ṣalāḥ was born either at Samsat or Hamadan. He trained as a physician. He served as court physician to Ilghazi (r. 1107–1122), the Artuqid ruler of Mardin. He ended his life in Damascus. He is known for his critique of errors in the transmission of Ptolemy's Almagest, for which he examined one Syriac and four Arabic manuscripts. He wrote a Treatise on Projection, commentaries on Galen and eight tracts on Euclid's Elements.
