= Mausoleum of Imam al-Shafi'i =

Burial site of al-Shafi'i in Cairo, Egypt

- قبة الإمام الشافعي
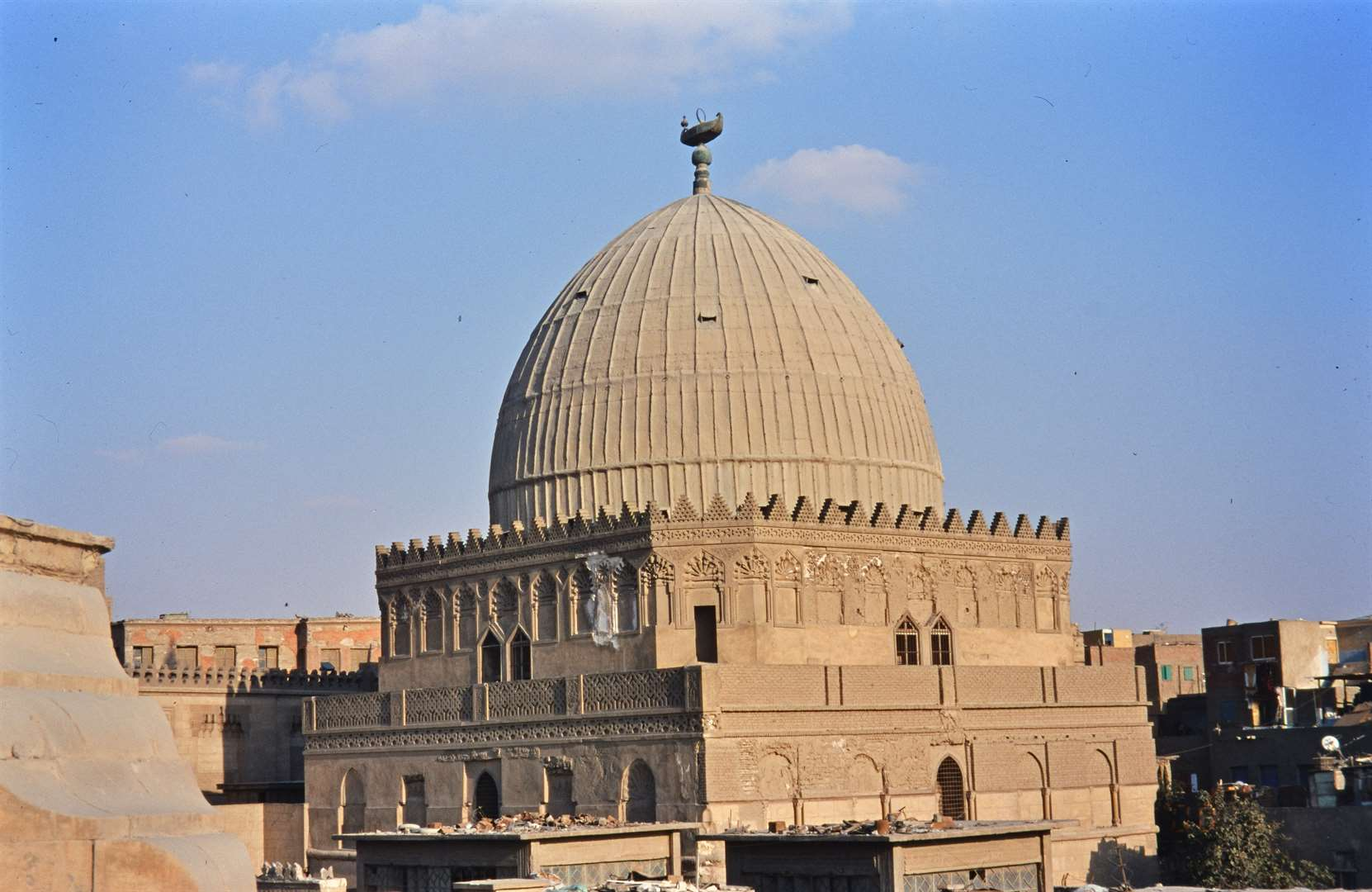

- Location of the mausoleum in Egypt

Religion
- Affiliation: Sunni Islam
- Patron: Imam al-Shafi'i

Location
- Location: City of the Dead, Cairo
- Country: Egypt
- Interactive map of Mausoleum of Imam al-Shafi'i
- Coordinates: 30°00′42″N 31°15′29″E

Architecture
- Style: Islamic architecture
- Founder: Salah ad-Din Ayyubi
- Established: 1178

Specifications
- Dome: One
- Shrine: One: al-Shafi'i
- Inscriptions: Quranic verses

The Mausoleum of Imam al-Shafi'i (Arabic: قبة الإمام الشافعي) is a mausoleum dedicated to al-Shafi'i, founder of the homonymous school (madhhab) of Sunni Islamic jurisprudence. Located at the Imam Shafi'i Street in the City of the Dead, Cairo, the mausoleum is a hallmark of Ayyubid style architecture and historical significance.

Imam al-Shafi'i travelled to Cairo in 813, where he taught at the Mosque of Amr ibn al-As, before his death in 819. He was buried by his child Ibn Abdulhakim in the place of turbah in the City of the Dead. Later, the Ayyubid sultan Salah ad-Din built a turbah and madrasa for Shafi'i in 1176, marking the first establishment on his grave. In 1178, a wooden coffin was created with decorations of Islamic geometric patterns and inscriptions of the Qur'anic verses and the life of Shafi'i in Kufic and Ayyub scripts. The decorations were created by Abid al-Najar.

In 1211, after the death of mother of the Ayyub Sultan al-Kamil, the sultan built a mausoleum for her near the site, and simultaneously built a dome and a building which covers the entire area as well as the grave of al-Shafi'i. This had become the current structure, consisted of wooden dome, and later added muqarnas and marble decorations furnished by the Mamluk Sultan Qaitbay in 1480. The building was restored during the era of the Mamluk Sultan al-Ghuri and the Ottoman wali Ali Bey al-Kabir in 1772 who added colored decorations for the inner wall, muqarnas and dome.

== History ==
=== Imam al-Shafi'i ===
Abū ʿAbdullāh Muḥammad ibn Idrīs al-Shāfiʿī, also known as Imam al-Shafi’i, was a Sunni theologian, writer, scholar, and Imam who was one of the first main contributors towards the Islamic principles of jurisprudence, Uṣūl al-fiqh. He was born in Gaza in 150 AH/769 AD. His father died when he was very young and his mother consequently moved them to Mecca, where his father’ s tribe was from. He began his education in Mecca by sitting in on the lectures of many scholars. It is said that he had memorized the entire Quran by age seven and the entire Muwatta of Imam Malik by age ten. He spent time among the Hazeel tribe outside of Mecca to learn Arabic language and poetry, where he also gained skill in archery and horse riding.

Around the age of 20, al-Shafi’i left Mecca for Medina to study religion under the great Imam Malik. It was very difficult to get a position learning from Imam Malik at the time, so the governor of Mecca wrote al-Shafi’i a letter of recommendation. However it was through later demonstration of his speaking skills that al-Shafi’i would be admitted to Imam Malik’s school. He studied with Imam Malik for 10 years and learned from other great scholars of Medina while there.

He founded his own Shafi’i madhhab or school of fiqh in Cairo where he taught his students his life’s work until his death in 819 in Egypt. Al-Shafi’i was buried in a tomb in the cemetery of Ibn ‘Abd al-Hakam in the al-Qarafa al-Sughra (City of the Dead) in Cairo.

=== Construction of the mausoleum ===
Nearly four hundred years after the Imam’s death, the new Ayyubid sultan, Salah al-Din (Saladin), established a Sunni madrasa, an educational institution, in the cemetery near the tomb of Imam al-Shafi’i and commissioned a magnificent wooden cenotaph intricately carved of teak over the grave of Imam al-Shafi’i in 1178.

The construction and sponsorship of both the madrasa and the cenotaph were a part of the Ayyubid efforts to consolidate Sunnism after the fall of the Shi’i Fatimid Caliphate and abolish all traces of Shi’ism in Egypt. Another motivation behind the construction of the madrasa near the grave of a Sunni jurist wasn’t only towards the revival of Sunnism but also a reflection of an intra-Sunni conflict between Shafi’i Asharites and the Hanbalis at the time.

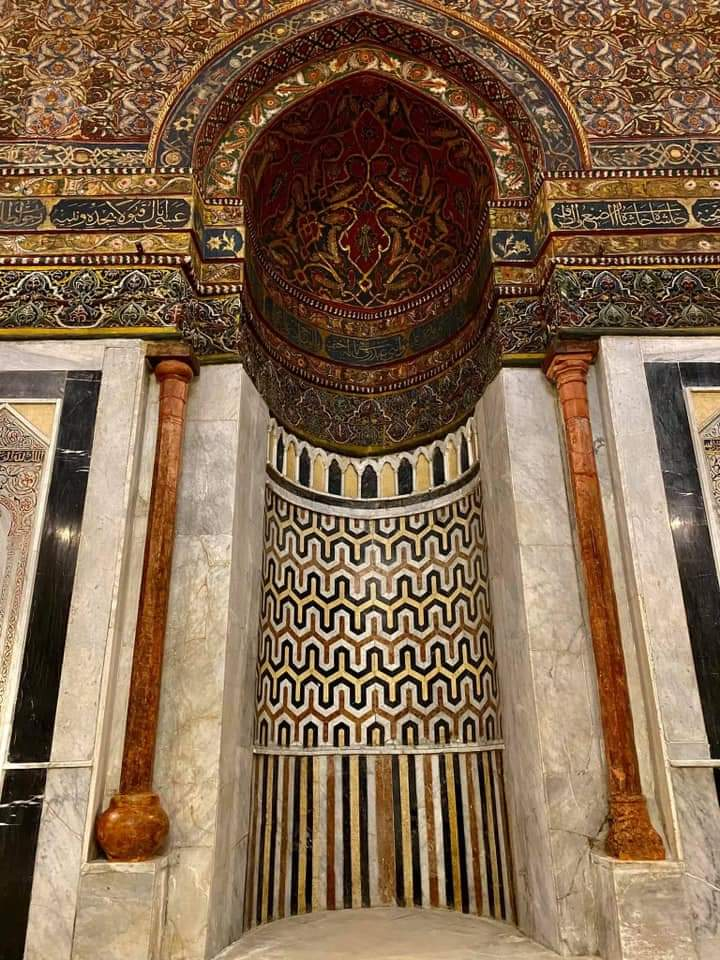
One of the six mihrabs inside the dome

In 1211, after the death of his late mother, the Ayyub Sultan al-Malik al-Kamil erected a mausoleum near the burial site of both al-Shafi’i and his mother. The sultan also adorned the top of the mausoleum with a large qubba or dome. The dome itself is made from wood and was one of the largest domes constructed during its time, second only to the Dome of the Rock in Jerusalem. The mausoleum itself is considered to be the largest freestanding tomb in Egypt. Some scholars argue that this commemorative and pious monument was built with the purpose of increasing the Sultan al-Kamil’s dynastic prestige as a place of entombment for himself and his family.

=== Later restorations ===
Much of the present structure still dates from the time of al-Kamil, but the wood dome and several decorative elements such as the muqarnas were the works of sultan Qaytbay. The complex was also altered by Sultan Qaytbay with renovations on the outer layer of the dome and the addition of a fourth mihrab. Renovations continued to be made between 1501-16 by Sultan Qansuh al-Ghuri and again to the dome and ornamental carvings by the governor Ali Bek al-Kabir in 1772.

The most recent conservation initiative began in 2016 due to centuries of natural exposure and weathering. This work was funded by the US Ambassadors’ Fund for Cultural Preservation and mainly focused on the dome, though new lighting was installed as well as an updated drainage system. Architectural deterioration like cracks and damaged fixtures were also addressed during this time with major work on the building’s exterior and interior stucco and masonry.

== Architecture ==
=== Exterior ===
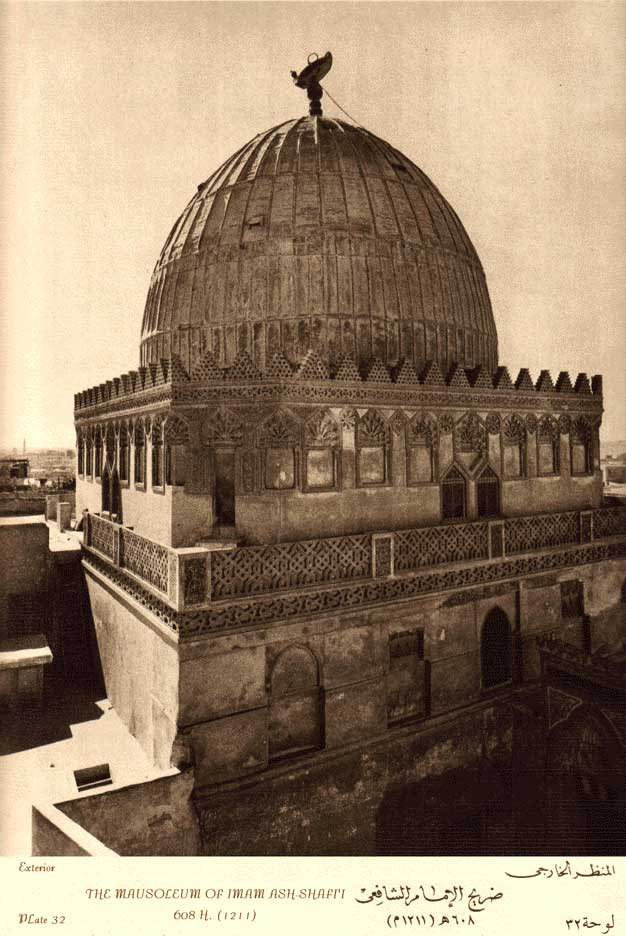
The dome or qubba on top of the Mausoleum of Imam Al-Shafi'i

The mausoleum’s base is a 15-meter stone square that supports a wooden dome topped with lead. Construction of the dome was completed under the fourth Ayyubid Sultan of Egypt, Al-Malik al-Kamil (1218–38). The dome is topped with a copper boat that is said to be filled with birdseed, an architectural feature carried over from early Fatimid dynasty. The Shafi’i dome has a vertical, rounded shape, unlike earlier Fatimid-era domes, which took on more pointed forms. Some elements of the exterior of the building is in Andalusian style, with extensive stucco decoration, carved colonnettes, as well as geometric patterns and tessellations that decorate the exterior.

=== Interior ===
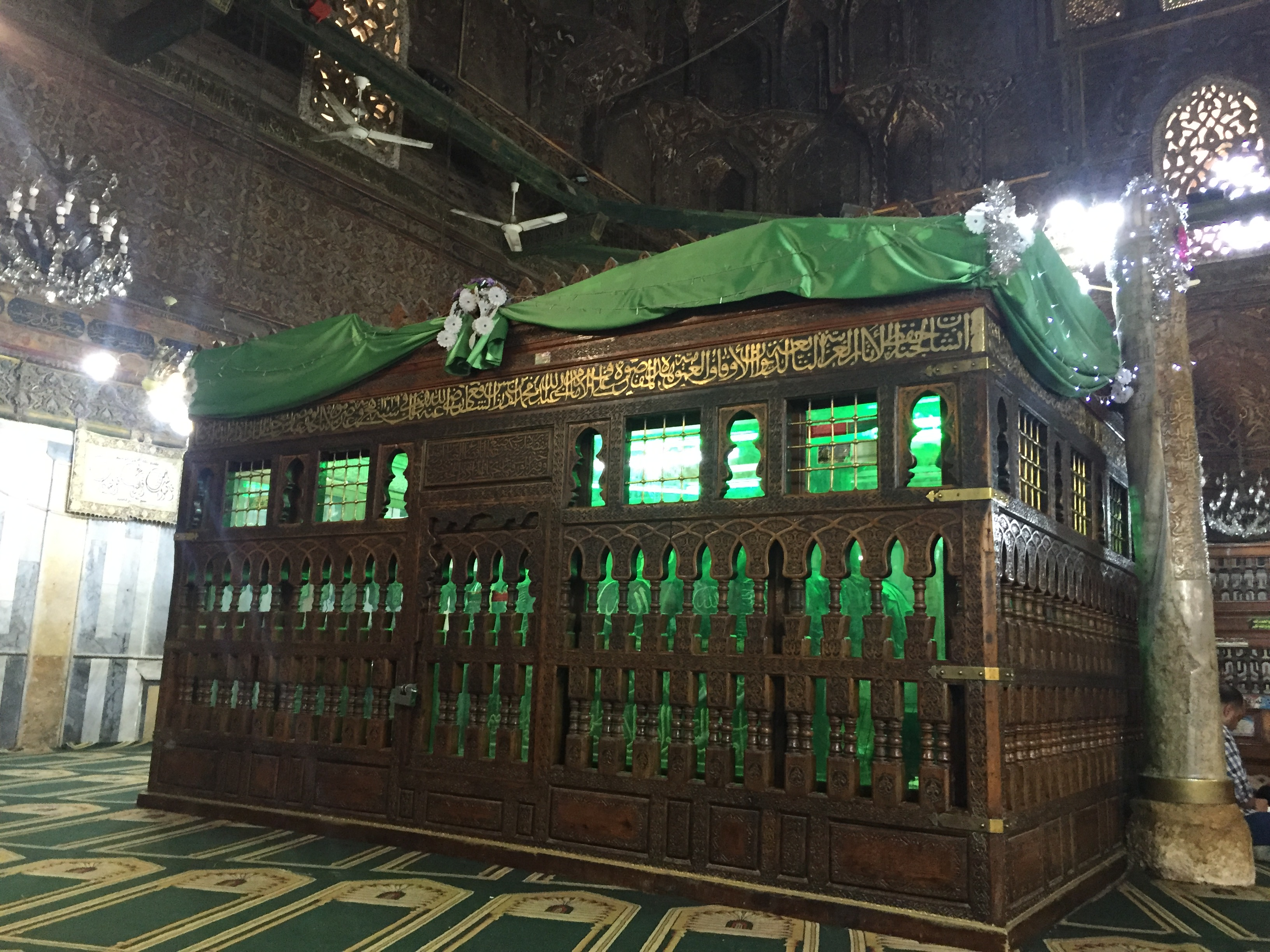
Large wooden Zarih built over the grave of al-Shafi'i before the renovation.

Inside the mausoleum, some of the original details from the Ayyubid era include a wooden frieze along the walls and the wooden beams that would have supported lamps. Additionally, Imam Shafi'i's cenotaph was added by Salah-al Din, founder of the Ayyubid dynasty. It was made by the woodworker Ubayd al-Najjar Ibn Ma’ali and is dated to 574 Hijra (1178 AD). The cenotaph is decorated with inscriptions in both Kufic and Naskhi script containing Qur’anic verses, accounts of al-Shafi'i's life, and the woodworker’s name. It is also decorated with panels of geometric ornamentation carved into the wood, featuring Ayubbid-style use of tessellations and geometric shapes. One of the Arabic inscriptions on the cenotaph reads: "This cenotaph was made for the Imam al-Shafi'i by Ubayd the carpenter, known as Ibn ma'am, in the months of the year five hundred seventy four. May God have mercy on him; may he [also] have mercy on those who are merciful toward him, those who call for mercy upon him, and upon all who worked with him--the woodworkers and carvers--and all the believers."

Renovations in the mausoleum were done in the late fifteenth century under Sultan Qaytbay, which included a painted interior dome and the addition of colored marble on the lower wall panels. Qaytbay also restored the building’s three prayer niches, adding Ayyubid-style muquarnas on the dome’s interior.

== See also ==
- Sayyida Zainab Mosque, Cairo
- High medieval domes
