= Khubayb ibn Adi =

Companion (Sahabah) of Muhammad

Khubayb ibn ʿAdi (Arabic: خبيب بن عدي) was a Sahabi (companion) of the Islamic prophet Muhammad. He was killed during the Expedition of Al Raji.

== Background to death ==
In 625, some men requested Muhammad to send instructors to teach them about Islam, but the men were bribed by the two tribes of Khuzaymah. The tribes wanted revenge for the assassination of Khalid bin Sufyan by Muhammad's followers because Khalid bin Sufyan planned to attack the Muslims in Medina. To accomplish this, they killed the Muslims. After killing Asim ibn Thabit, Hudhayl wanted to sell his head.

According to William Montgomery Watt, an Anglican priest and orientalist, the most common version of the event states that the motives of the Banu Lahyan for attacking Muslims was that the Banu Lahyan wanted to get revenge for the assassination of their chief. So they bribed the two tribes of Khuzaymah to say they wanted to convert to Islam. Watt also said that the seven men Muhammad sent may have been spies for Muhammad and instructors for the Arab tribes. He also said that it is difficult to verify the exact date the assassination of their chief took place.

According to the Muslim scholar Safiur Rahman Mubarakpuri, the Quraysh ordered Khubayb bin Adi to be crucified by Uqba bin al-Harith because he had killed Uqba bin al-Harith's father.

Muhammad ordered The Mission of Amr bin Umayyah al-Damri to assassinate Abu Sufyan to avenge Khubayb bin Adi.

== Death ==
Khubaib ibn Adi was taken captive and escorted in a procession of thousands which was led by men like Abu Sufyan ibn Harb, and Safwan ibn Umayah, and which included Said ibn Amir.

The women and children pushed him to the place set for his death. Khubaib's death was to be in revenge for Quraysh losses in the Battle of Badr. When the assembled throng arrived at the appointed place with him, the prisoner, Khubaib said in a firm but quiet voice amid the shouting of women and children:

"If you would, leave me to pray two rakaats before my death."

Khubaib ibn Adi requested and was granted permission to offer two rak'ahs (units) of salah (prayer) before he was executed by crucifixion. He then prayed, "Had I not feared that you would think that I was afraid (of being executed), I would have prolonged the prayer". Khubaib ibn Adi thus established a tradition for Muslims facing death in captivity to pray two rak'ahs before their execution.

This the Quraysh allowed. Khubaib faced the Ka'bah and prayed two rakaats. Then Khubaib faced the Quraysh leaders.

"By God, if you thought that I asked to pray out of fear of death, I would think the prayer not worth the trouble," he said. Khubaib's act set a precedent for other Muslims sentenced to death in captivity to offer a two-rak'ah prayer before their execution.

Then the Meccans set about dismembering Khubayb's body while he was yet alive and taunting him in the process.

"Would you like Muhammad to be in your place while you go free?"

With his blood flowing, he replied, "By God, I would not want to be safe and secure among my family while even a thorn hurts Muhammad." People shook their fists in the air and the shouting increased.

"Kill him. Kill him!"

Khubaib lifted his eyes to the heavens above the wooden cross.

"O Allah, send my salam to my prophet Muhammad"

Thereafter it could not be counted the number of swords and spears which cut through Khubaib's body.

== See also ==
- List of battles of Muhammad
- Sahaba
