= Dawah =

Proselytizing or preaching of Islam

Daʿwah (Arabic: دعوة, Arabic: [ˈdaʕwah], "invitation") (Note: Romanized in different languages as dâvah, daawa, dawah, daawah or dakwah) is the act of proselytizing people to Islam. The plural is daʿwāt (دَعْوات) or daʿawāt (دَعَوات). A preacher who engages in dawah is known as a da'i.

== Etymology ==
Daʿwah [ˈdæʕwæh] literally means "issuing a summons" or "making an invitation". Grammatically, the word represents a gerund of a verb with the triconsonantal root d-ʕ-w (د-ع-و) meaning variously "to summon" or "to invite". A Muslim who practices daʿwah, either as a religious worker or in a volunteer community effort, is called a dāʿī (داعي, plural duʿāh دعاة [dʊˈʕæː]).

A dāʿī, is a person who helps people to understand and accept Islam through debates and other techniques, who may be regarded as a missionary inviting people to the faith, prayer, and manner of Islamic life.

== Early Islam ==
The term daʿwah has other senses in the Qur'an. In surah (chapter) 30:25, for example, it denotes the call to the dead to rise on the Day of Judgment. When used in the Qur'an, it generally refers to Allah's invitation to live according to his will. Thus, when used in the first centuries of Islam, it usually referred to that message and was sometimes used interchangeably with Sharia and dīn.

Daʿwah is also described as the duty to "actively encourage fellow Muslims in the pursuance of greater piety in all aspects of their lives", a definition which has become central to contemporary Islamic thought.

== During Muhammad's era ==
During the Expedition of Al Raji in 625, Muhammad sent some men as missionaries to various different tribes. Some men came to Muhammad and requested that Muhammad send instructors to teach them Islam, but the men were bribed by the two tribes of Khuzaymah, who wanted revenge for the assassination of Khalid bin Sufyan (Chief of the Banu Lahyan tribe) by Muhammad's followers. A number of missionaries were killed in this expedition, either eight or, according to another account, ten.

Then during the Expedition of Bir Maona in July 625 Muhammad sent some missionaries at the request of some men from the Banu Amir tribe, but the Muslims were again killed in revenge for the assassination of Khalid bin Sufyan by Muhammad's followers. 70 Muslims were killed during this expedition.

During the Expedition of Khalid ibn al-Walid (Banu Jadhimah) in January 630, Muhammad sent Khalid ibn Walid to invite the Banu Jadhimah tribe to Islam. This is mentioned in the Sunni Hadith Sahih al-Bukhari, 5:59:628.

Mus'ab ibn 'Umair was the first Muslim envoy in September 621. He was sent to Yathrib (now Medina) to teach the people the doctrines of Islam and give them guidance.

=== Post-Muhammad ===
For a period of time after Muhammad's death in 632, Muslims engaged little in daʿwah. Inhabitants of places conquered by Muslims did convert to Islam, but daʿwah did not play a major part in that. Daʿwah was first organized for missionary purposes in the 9th century by Isma'ilis, though their focus was on other Muslims at first.

== Purpose ==
In Islamic theology, the purpose of daʿwah is to invite people, Muslims and non-Muslims, to understand the worship of God as expressed in the Qur'an and the sunnah of Muhammad and to inform them about Muhammad.

Daʿwah as the "Call towards God" is the means by which Muhammad began spreading the message of the Qur'an to mankind. After Muhammad, his followers and the Ummah (Muslim community) assumed responsibility for it. They convey the message of the Qur'an by providing information on why and how the Qur'an preaches monotheism. Muhammad saw Islam as the true religion and mission of all earlier prophets. He believed that their call had been limited to their own people but that his was universal. His mission as the final prophet was to repeat to the whole world this call and invitation (daʿwah) to Islam. Muhammad wrote to various non-Muslim rulers, inviting them to convert.

== Scriptural basis ==
The importance of daʿwah has been emphasised many times in the Quran:

Who is better in speech than one who calls to Allah, does righteous deeds and says indeed I am among the Muslims.

— Quran, Sura 41 (Fussilat), ayah 33

You are the best nation raised up for humankind. You enjoin righteousness, forbid corruption and you believe in Allah.

— Quran, Sura 3 (Al-Imran), ayah 110

Let there arise among you a group inviting to all that is good, enjoining righteousness and forbidding evil. Those are the successful ones.

— Quran, Sura 3 (Al-Imran), ayah 104

Call to the way of your Lord with wisdom and good preaching.

— Quran, Sura 16 (An-Nahl), ayah 125

In the Hadith ("sayings") of Muhammad, daʿwah is mentioned to emphasise importance and virtues:

"Whoever directs someone to do good will gain the same reward as the one who does good."
"Whoever calls to guidance will receive the same reward as the one who follows him without any decrease in the reward of his follower."
"For Allah to guide someone by your hand is better for you than having red camels."
(In ancient Arabia, camels – especially of a reddish hue – were considered particularly valuable property.)
"Convey from me, even if it be only a single verse."

Muhammad sent Muadh ibn Jabal to Yemen and told him "You will be going to Christians and Jews, so the first thing you should invite them to is the assertion of the oneness of Allah, Most High. If they realize that, then inform them that Allah has made five daily prayers obligatory on them. If they pray them, then inform them that Allah has made the payment of charity from their wealth obligatory on their rich to be given to their poor. If they accept that, then take it from them and avoid the best part of people's property."

The 256th verse (ayah) of Al-Baqara, in the Quran, includes the phrase that "there is no compulsion in religion". The Quran says that, since the revelation has clearly distinguished righteousness from unrighteousness, the people must choose which to follow. This verse immediately follows The Verse of the Throne.

== Methods ==
=== Gentleness ===
With regard to Muhammad's mild nature in preaching Islam, the Quran says:

And by the mercy of Allah you dealt with them gently. If you were harsh and hardhearted, they would have fled from around you. (Quran 3:159).

The Quran says about Moses and Aaron who preached to Pharaoh, the claimant of God:

So speak to him, both of you, mildly in order that he may reflect or fear God. (Quran 20:44).

Muhammad was reported by his wife Aisha to have said "Whenever gentleness is in a thing, it beautifies it, and whenever it is withdrawn from something, it defaces."

Muhammad was quoted by Jareer as saying, "One deprived of gentleness is deprived of all good."

=== Wisdom ===
"Invite to the way of your Lord with wisdom and good instruction, and argue with them in a way that is best. Indeed, your Lord is most knowing of who has strayed from His way, and He is most knowing of who is [rightly] guided ...". (Quran 16:125).

A classical example of diversion in daʿwah can be seen in the case of Yusuf in prison when two prisoners asked him to interpret their dreams. One of them said: "I saw myself pressing wine." The other said: "I saw myself carrying bread on my head and birds were eating from it." They asked: "Inform us of the interpretation of these things. Indeed, we believe you are one of the righteous." He replied: "Whenever food came to you as your provision, I informed you about it before it came. That is from what my Lord has taught me ... As for one of you, he will pour wine for his lord to drink, and as for the other, he will be crucified and birds will eat from his head. This is the case judged concerning which you both inquire." (Quran 12:35–41)

=== Location ===
Doing daʿwah in the right location. For example, Mount Safa in the time of Muhammad was used for announcements. So Muhammad went there to make his point. He chose that particular location because he knew the people who he was inviting to Islam. He knew their nature and characteristics, so he chose Mount Safa. He climbed up to its summit and addressed his people saying: "O people of Quraysh, if I were to tell you there was an army behind this hill would you listen to me?"

== Daʿwah training workshops ==
Various Islamic institutions provide elaborate manuals, trainings and workshops to daʿi to prepare them for successful daʿwah.

Daʿis are given trainings in the form of physical workshops and training sessions. Daʿwah trainings are also provided in the form of online video lessons, webinars, online discussion forums, handouts and quizzes.

== Movements ==
Modern daʿwah movements are varied in their objectives and activities. Examples include:

- The Muslim Brotherhood has focused on a methodology of building grassroots institutions and funding welfare projects, which has helped it survive decades of repression under hostile governments in many Middle Eastern countries, with the group and its many offshoots still enjoying popular support and power.
- Jamaat-e-Islami has focused on presenting Islam as a complete way of life and on the methodology of building grassroots institutions and funding welfare projects.
- Tablighi Jamaat works on trying to bring the Muslims back to the fundamental practices of Islam such as worship; they do this by encouraging members to speak and to teach them the virtues of good actions. The movement has a following of between 20 and 80 million people and, though it originated in India, now has a global following.
- Ahmed Deedat was a notable debater who was a revolutionary figure among Muslims for his effort in debating Christian polemics. Many Muslim debaters from popular debaters to grassroots daʿwah campaigners use his books and videos as reference material.
- Zakir Naik was a student of Ahmed Deedat and followed in his teacher's footsteps by debating Christian polemics and by holding Q&A sessions with Christians. Zakir Naik is particularly notable for taking the effort of debating Christian polemics to the Muslim mainstream with his popular channel Peace TV.
- iERA is a research institute based in London which seeks to debate Muslim and non-Muslim intellectuals, help new Muslims, train speakers and produce academic research papers on daʿwah issues. iERA was founded by Abdurraheem Green (Anthony Green) and Yusuf Chambers, British converts to Islam. It developed the GORAP method for daʿwah: God's Oneness, Revelation and Prophethood. GORAP is a framework for holding daʿwah conversations and conveying the message of Islam in stages.
- The Murabitun World Movement is a movement in Spain that advocates pledging allegiance to an emir and the revival of the Islamic gold dinar as currency for zakat.
- Discover Islam Centre established in Cape Town, South Africa, 2005 by Dr Abdullah Hakim Quick from Canada. Conveying the message of Islam to people of all walks of life. Offering classes to Non Muslims and New Muslims to learn more about the fundamentals of Islam.
- Uplift Dawah is a Dawah non-profit based in Seattle, Washington, with chapters in Seattle and Africa.
- Northwest Dawah Foundation is a daʿwah non-profit based in Portland, Oregon with activities in Southwest Washington and Oregon.
- Al Furqaaan Foundation is a daʿwah non-profit based in Chicago which focuses on distributing Qur'an through partner daʿwah organizations across the United States.
- The Latino American Dawah Organization is a grassroots organization founded in 1997 to propagate Islam within the Hispanic American community. LADO frequently makes references to the history of Islamic Spain in their works.

Methods may also depend upon specific creeds. For instance, among Ismailis, al-Naysaburi's Code of Conduct depicts the values in which dais should spread the word of Islam to Muslims and non-Muslims. Idris Imad al-Din's work presents us with an indigenous account of the traditions of the daʿwa in Yaman. His account of the Nizari–Musta'li succession dispute reflects the official view of the Tayyibis. Similarly, modern-day platforms designated for open-air public speaking in the western world also provide platforms for debate between different denominations in Islam, with documented instances of dialogue being reported between demographics such as Quranists and Mahdi'ist based creeds such as Mahdavia.

There are also Da'wah inspired movements that do not focus on the dissemination of Islamic creed, but rather on the promotion of secularism. Termed by Maya Mikdashi as evangelical secularism, these evangelical secularists in Lebanon attempt to encounter the sectarian state of their country by increasing the space of robust Secularism in a sectarian Lebanon. During the Laïque Pride, the organizers of the pride, referred to the Islamic Da' wah to describe the tactics of expanding their ideology.

== See also ==
- Tabligh
- Spread of Islam
- Islamic missionary activity
- Jizyah – a tax on non-Muslim population
