= Abd Allah bin Tariq =

Companion of Muhammad

Abdullah Bin Tariq was a companion of the Islamic Prophet Muhammad. He was killed during the Expedition of Al Raji. In 625 some men requested that Muhammad send instructors to teach them Islam, but the men were bribed by the two tribes of Khuzaymah who wanted revenge for the assassination of Khalid bin Sufyan by Muhammad's followers and they killed the Muslims After killing Asim ibn Thabit, Hudhayl wanted to sell his head.

However, the Muslims refused to believe the promise of the polytheists and fought back. All the Muslims, except Zayd bin al-Dathinnah, Khubyab bin Adi and Abd Allah bin Tariq were killed. These three Muslims surrendered and were taken as prisoners to be sold in Mecca.

== See also ==
- List of battles of Muhammad
