= Abdullah ibn Unais =

Companion (Sahabah) of Muhammad

Abdullah ibn Unais was a companion of the Islamic prophet Muhammad. He participated in several military campaigns ordered by Muhammad. The first was to kill Khalid ibn Sufyan al-Hudhali who belonged to the Banu Lahyan tribe. Muhammad said that he was planning on attacking Madinah and inciting the people of Nakhla and Uranah to attack him. Therefore he sent Abdullah ibn Unais to assassinate him in 625 during the Expedition of Abdullah Ibn Unais.

Abdullah ibn Unais found Hudayr in the company of his wife, when asked about his identity. Unais replied, "I am an Arab tribesman who has heard of you and the army you are raising to fight Muhammad, so I have come to join your ranks."

Then Muhammad sent him on the Expedition of Al Raji. Some men requested that Muhammad send instructors to teach them Islam, but the men were bribed by the two tribes of Khuzaymah who wanted revenge for the assassination of Khalid bin Sufyan by Muhammad's followers.

== See also ==
- 7th century in Lebanon § Ṣaḥāba who have visited Lebanon
- List of battles of Muhammad
- List of Sahabah
