= Bilal: A New Breed of Hero =

- Directed by: Khurram H. Alavi; Ayman Jamal
- Screenplay by: Alex Kronemer; Michael Wolfe; Khurram Alavi; Yassin Kamel
- Story by: Ayman Jamal
- Produced by: Ayman Jamal; Arif Jilani
- Starring: Adewale Akinnuoye-Agbaje; Ian McShane; China Anne McClain; Jacob Latimore; Thomas Ian Nicholas; Fred Tatasciore; Michael Gross
- Edited by: Patricia Heneine
- Music by: Atli Örvarsson
- Production company: Barajoun Entertainment
- Distributed by: Gulf Film
- Release dates: 9 December 2015 (Dubai Film Festival); 8 September 2016 (Dubai); 2 February 2018 (United States)
- Running time: 109 minutes
- Country: United Arab Emirates
- Languages: English, Turkish, Arabic, French, Persian, Italian, Ukrainian, Bengali Russian, Italian, German, Spanish, Urdu
- Budget: $30 million
- Box office: $4.3 million

Bilal: A New Breed of Hero is a 2015 English-language Emirati 3D animated action-adventure film about the birth of Islam, produced by Barajoun Entertainment and co-directed by Khurram H. Alavi and Ayman Jamal. With a story by Jamal, the screenplay was written by Alavi, Alex Kronemer, Michael Wolfe and Yassin Kamel. With this film, Jamal aimed to depict heroes from the history of the Arabian Peninsula.

The film depicts the life of Bilal ibn Rabah, who, known for his beautiful voice, was freed from slavery and rose to a position of prominence in 632 AD. The voice cast features Adewale Akinnuoye-Agbaje, Ian McShane, China Anne McClain, Jacob Latimore, Thomas Ian Nicholas, Fred Tatasciore, Cynthia McWilliams, Jon Curry, Dave B. Mitchell and Michael Gross.

Bilal premiered on December 9, 2015, at the 12th Annual International Dubai Film Festival. Starting September 8, 2016, the film released throughout the MENA region. The film began an international rollout in February 2018.

Bilal won "Best Inspiring Movie" on Animation Day at the 2016 Cannes Film Festival. It won "Best Innovative Movie" at the BroadCast Pro Middle East Award 2016. Bilal was nominated for Best Animated Feature Film at the 2016 Asia Pacific Screen Awards, the region's highest accolade for film.

== Plot ==
Bilal lives a peaceful life with his mother and his younger sister on the outskirt of the village until the Byzantine soldiers come, enslave them, and kill his mother.

During his childhood, he is sold as a slave to the richest man in the city of Mecca, Umayyah, one of the Quraysh's leaders. While getting water for his master, he encounters Okba, another of Quraysh's leaders, who is persuading the people of Mecca to come to his shop and buy various types of idols from him, and the mysterious and masked Charlatan Priest, who tricks people to give their money to him with promises that the idols will grant them all of their desires.

In another part of the city, Safwan, Umayyah's son, is bullying Ghufaira, Bilal's sister, along with his friends and is about to shoot her with an arrow when Bilal intervenes and saves her. Umayyah hears about this from one of his merchants and reminds Bilal of his status with brutality before ordering the guards to whip him. After that, Umayyah slaps Safwan for losing to a slave and embarrassing him.

One day, Bilal meets and befriends a white horse, whom he rides until adulthood. He becomes friends with Saad, a skilled archer. On his way back to Umayyah's mansion, he stops a hungry young boy from stealing from the idol's bowl to spare him a beating from the Meccan Priest's guards. He gives the boy his own food instead. His act of kindness is seen by Abu Bakr, a man who believes in equality for everyone and sees greatness in Bilal. However, Bilal doubts him and his beliefs, unable to see a future where slaves are treated fairly. Unbeknownst to both of them, Safwan's servant had been watching them while they had their conversation.

After receiving a gift from Sohaib, a slave of Persian origin purchased from the Roman lands, which is actually the gift from his master to Umayyah, Bilal is told to sing at Umayyah's feast at night. He leaves after his song to the sound of his master's friends mockingly praising, laughing, and insulting his late mother. The next day, Bilal goes back to Abu Bakr to ask for clarity and accepts his belief that there is only one God. He also learns that even people like Umayyah are slaves as well, their master being "greed".

At the next feast celebrating Safwan's first success as a merchant, another Quraysh leader named Abu al-Hakam, warned Umayyah of the new movement opposing them. Upon learning from al-Hakam that some of his fellow merchants are beginning to join the new movement, Umayyah is enraged by this and demands to know of any more traitors among his ranks. Seeing the opportunity, Safwan accuses Bilal of being part of the new movement. After being questioned by his master, Bilal then defies Umayyah and is taken to a cage where he is tortured every day to force him to renounce his claims. One day, Umayyah comes and offers him an opportunity to be a spy against the movement. Bilal does not yield and is then taken out to the public where he is chained in front of the Meccans. A large boulder is put on top of him to slowly crush him, but he was saved by Abu Bakr who buys him from his oppressive master.

Ghufaira, however, was given to Safwan by his father as a gift. He chooses not to sell her just to torture Bilal mentally. Three months later, after being sold off to his new master, Abu Bakr frees Bilal. Bilal is then taught how to fight with a sword by Hamza, who is the foster brother, paternal uncle, and also one of the companions of the movement's leader, while also traveling with them up north, fleeing from the persecution of the Meccans. One year later, after the migration to the great city of Yathrib, now renamed as Medina, Safwan sends Bilal a lock of Ghufaira's hair. Bilal immediately rides back to Mecca after receiving it, followed by Hamza. They find a part of the city on fire, where many who are part of the new movement are slaughtered by the order of Umayyah and his fellow corrupted merchants. Bilal hurries to Umayyah's mansion and is caught by the guards. Safwan then shows him a coin that Ghufaira had been keeping safe for Bilal. However, the coin is drenched in blood, implying that Ghufaira has been killed. Just as the guards are about to execute Bilal, Hamza steps in and saves him, after which they both successfully escape back to Medina.

A year later, two more cities join the new movement like Medina, resulting in Umayyah and his merchants deciding to declare war on them for threatening the Meccans' power. Amid the battle, Bilal faces Umayyah and asks that they end the war for the sake of peace. However, Umayyah refuses and is killed by Bilal. Due to the deaths of Umayyah and al-Hakam in the battle as well as help from divine warriors who come to the movement's aid, the army of Qurayshi Meccans quickly fall into disorganization and are subsequently defeated.

The death of Umayyah spreads fast in every city and the angry Safwan prepares for revenge with his troops from various allying cities of the peninsula. A year later, Hamza dies in another battle against the Qurayshi warriors of Mecca, becoming a martyr along with those who were killed in the battle.

Many years later, most of the cities in Arabia have fallen and only Mecca remains opposing the newly-emerged and unified polity. The High Priest of Mecca is dead after an attempt to please the idols by fasting. However, his attempt ends in vain and all idols of Mecca have proven to be powerless. Bilal confronts Safwan during the conquest of Mecca and asks why he had to kill Ghufaira. It was then revealed that Ghufaira was alive. Safwan reiterates Bilal's words, that a man is judged by his actions, and says that freeing Ghufaira will be his one act of morality. Bilal spares Safwan, leaves his chamber, and encourages him to continue on this path.

After Bilal and Ghufaira reunite, Safwan hears the noise coming from the city's holy site and comes out to see Bilal call for prayer at the Kaaba after the statue of Hubal and the other idols have been removed.

== Cast ==
- Adewale Akinnuoye-Agbaje as Bilal
  - Jacob Latimore as Bilal (teenager):
- Ian McShane as Umayyah
- Dave B. Mitchell as Hamza
- Cynthia McWilliams as Hamama
- Fred Tatasciore as Al Siddiq
- Fred Tatasciore as Charlatan Priest
- Thomas Ian Nicholas as Saad
- China Anne McClain as Ghufaira
- Jon Curry as Sohaib
- Al Rodrigo as Abu al-Hakam
- Mick Wingert as Safwan
- Michael Gross as Okba

=== Arabic version ===
- Qusay Khader as Bilal bin Rabah
- Jamal Suliman as Umayya bin Khalaf
- Asaad Khalifa in the role of Hamza bin Abdul Muttalib
- Jihad Al-Atrash as Abu Bakr Al-Siddiq
- Ola Al-Fares in the role of Ghufaira bint Rabah and Hamamah Umm Bilal
- Faisal Al-Zahrani as Safwan bin Umayya
- Yasser Al-Saqqaf as Suhaib Al-Rumi

=== Turkish version ===
- Engin Altan Duzyatan as Bilal

=== Bengali version ===
- Raisul Islam Asad as Abu Bakr
- Arman Parvez Murad as Hamza
- Shatabdi Wadud as Safwan (young and old)

== Animation ==
=== The Falcon ===
As a character the presence of the Falcon was as a companion of Hamza the warrior. The Falcon in Arabic literature and culture is a representation of authenticity, pride and bravery.

Special Programming Scripts were used in order to achieve the hyper realistic animation of the falcon as it folded (and spread) its wings. The falcon rig setup was made up of a number of joints and controls which allowed the animators to deliver a hyper realistic animation performance for the bird's neck movement. Each wing hosted close to 150 controls for the feather sets only. Getting the wings to look correct during the action of folding and unfolding was no easy challenge either.

The rig is undoubtedly the most complex setup Barajoun built for the film. Each shot of the falcon in the film took over 5 terabytes.

=== Battle of Badr ===
This battle scene in Bilal is the longest in animation history. Conventionally, each frame can only hold 7 items in animation.

The battle scene held a grand total of 310 figures, including weaponry, warriors, and horses. It was so ambitious that many crew members left believing that it could not be done. The remaining team, however, did not give up. They hired actual Chinese warriors to act out the battle for the perfect animation.

=== Hamza's Horse ===
Apart from the technical mastery it took to create them, the animals that appear in the movie create a symbolic message. The horse to Bilal was a representation of courage, power and strength. The idea of having a wooden horse toy as a child represented a dream of being a warrior. He grew up trying to master a white horse in the stable, and up until he learnt how to gallop through sand dunes and tread long distances, he had to be patient. This whole process of waiting and enduring being thrown off the horse many times is the process of Bilal turning into a warrior himself.

The production team at Barajoun researched and created case studies of horses that were available at that historical era. The team went later to Shaikh Mohammad Bin Rashid equestrian club, as he holds one of the most extensive horse collections in the world, and they built the horse's research database there. The Arabian horse was a point of reference, so the art team took it from there, visualizing stylized interpretation of the majestic animal. Numerous patterns and landmarks were incorporated into the design of these beasts, so that every horse had a presence of its own. Heavy research on the mannerisms of actual horses were undertaken by Barajoun's animation wing for a span of three months. The same was employed by the FX team taking them two years to develop the complex fur, rig, and animation.

Every horse has more than two million hair strands, making it take over four hours to render a single frame. The complex rig contained nearly 1000 controls along with the skeletal and muscle systems. The epic “Battle of Badr” used anywhere from 50 to 1000 of these horses in most of its shots.

== Music ==
The music was composed by Atli Örvarsson, with additional music by Claudio Olachea, performed by the London Symphony Orchestra at Abbey Road Studio. Örvarsson employed a unique blend of Icelandic music fused with Oriental music in order to develop a language that spoke to a wider audience. Music recording and mixing engineering on the show was done by Steve McLaughlin. Stephen Gallagher performed mix duties during the final mix of the show, also producing the song "Distant Shadows", with lyrics by Khurram H. Alavi.

The musical score and sound design were mixed and finalised at Peter Jackson's Park Road Post in Wellington, New Zealand. The final mix was handled by academy award-winning Michael Hedges and his team of seasoned PRP engineers.

== Release ==
A special screening was held at the Ajyal Youth Film Festival in Doha, Qatar on November 9, 2015. The film premiered at the 12th Annual Dubai International Film Festival on December 9, 2015. It continued its festival circuit over the course of 2016 being screened in Berlin, Cannes, Annecy, and Toronto. It was released in cinemas all across the MENA region. It was scheduled to be released in the US and other parts of the world on February 2, 2018.

The film has been also released in Turkey dubbed the lead character Bilal by Engin Altan Duzyatan. Turkish president Recep Tayyip Erdogan attended the premiere show and highly praised the film.

=== Critical reception ===
On review aggregator website Rotten Tomatoes, the film holds an approval rating of 59% based on 39 reviews, and an average rating of 5.8/10. On Metacritic, the film has a weighted average score of 52 out of 100, based on 11 critics, indicating "mixed or average reviews".

== Awards and nominations ==
The film was officially selected at the Annecy International Animated Film Festival under Best Feature Film. It was also nominated for APSA, the region's highest accolade in film for Best Animated Feature Film after winning "Best Inspiring Movie" in Animation Day in Cannes Festival and "Best Innovative Movie" at the BroadCast Pro Middle East Award. The film was also nominated for “Best Animated Feature Film” at the Asia Pacific Screen Awards (APSA) and screened at the United Nations Headquarters in New York, USA last March 2017. The film is currently in the list for 100 best animated feature films by USA Today, as well as in the Top 10 of 2018 list of animated movies on IMDB.

== See also ==
- List of Islamic films
- List of animated Islamic films
- Muhammad in film
