= Zayd bin al-Dathinnah =

Companion (Sahabah) of Muhammad

Zayd bin al-Dathinnah (Arabic: زيد بن الدثنة) was a companion of the Islamic Prophet Muhammad. He was killed during the Expedition of Al Raji. In 625 some men requested that Muhammad send instructors to teach them Islam, but the men were bribed by the two tribes of Khuzaymah who wanted revenge for the assassination of Khalid bin Sufyan by Muhammad's followers and they killed the Muslims

After killing Asim ibn Thabit, Hudhayl wanted to sell his head. Zayd bin al-Dathinah was sold to Safwan bin Umaiyah, Abu Sufyan wanted to spare his life in exchange for the life of Muhammad. But Zayd's love for Muhammad was so great that he did not want Muhammad to be hurt even by a "thorn prick".

According to the Muslim scholar Safiur Rahman Mubarakpuri, Zayd bin al-Dathinnah was purchased by Safwan ibn Umayya, and he killed Zayd bin al-Dathinnah because he murdered his father.

== See also ==
- List of battles of Muhammad
