= Feint =

French term in swordsmanship and fencing

Feint, a French term that entered English via the discipline of swordsmanship and fencing, is a maneuver designed to distract or mislead. A feint is achieved by giving the impression that a certain maneuver will take place, while in fact another, or even none, will. In military tactics and many types of combat, there are two types of feints: feint attacks and feint retreats.

== Attacks ==
A feint attack is designed to draw defensive action towards the point under assault. It is usually used as a diversion to force the enemy to concentrate more manpower in a given area, to weaken the opposing force in another area. Unlike a related diversionary maneuver, the demonstration, a feint involves actual contact with the enemy.

== Retreats ==
A feint retreat, or feigned retreat, is performed by briefly engaging the enemy, then retreating. It is intended to draw the enemy pursuit into a prepared ambush, or to cause disarray. For example, the Battle of Hastings was lost when Saxons pursued the Norman cavalry. That forfeited the advantage of height and the line was broken, providing the opportunity to fight in single handed combat on a neutral vantage point, a battle for which the Saxons were not ready. The Parthian shot is another example of a feint retreat in which mounted Parthian archers would retreat from a battle and, still riding, they would turn their bodies back to shoot at the pursuing enemy.

== Historic use ==
=== Arabia during Muhammad era ===
Muhammad made extensive use of feints. One of the earliest examples was during the Invasion of Banu Lahyan. Muhammad set out in Rabi‘ Al-Awwal, or Jumada Al-Ula, in the 6 AH (July 627 AD) with 200 Muslim fighters and made a feint of heading for Syria and then soon changed route towards Batn Gharran, where 10 Muslims were killed in the Expedition of Al Raji. Bani Lahyan were on alert and got the news of his march. The tribe then immediately fled to the mountaintops nearby and thus remained out of his reach. On his way back, Muhammad despatched a group of ten horsemen to a place called Kura‘ Al-Ghamim, in the vicinity of the habitation of Quraish, in order to indirectly confirm his growing military power. All the skirmishes took 14 days, after which he left back for home.

Muhammad also ordered the Expedition of Abu Qatadah ibn Rab'i al-Ansari (Batn Edam) in December 629 to divert the attention from his intention of attacking Mecca. He dispatched eight men to attack a caravan passing through Edam.

=== China during the end of the Han dynasty ===
During the Battle of Fancheng general Xu Huang of Cao Wei was sent to oppose Guan Yu at Fancheng District. Knowing that most of his enemy's soldiers were composed of new recruits without training, Xu Huang did not go into battle straight away but camped behind the enemy to impose a deterrent effect. Meanwhile, he instructed his subordinates Xu Shang (徐商) and Lü Jian (呂建) to oversee the digging of trenches around the nearby enemy stronghold of Yancheng (偃城) to deceive the enemy into thinking that it was trying to cut off supplies into Yancheng. The deception worked, with the position being abandoned, which yielded Xu Huang a foothold on the battlefield. By then, a total of twelve camps had been gathered under the flag of Xu Huang. With the strengthened army, Xu Huang finally unleashed an attack on Guan Yu's camp. The enemy encirclement had five camps and so Xu Huang spread news that he was planning to attack the main camp. He secretly attacked the other four side camps instead. When Guan Yu saw that the four side camps had been destroyed, he personally led 5,000 horsemen to meet the attackers but was eventually outmatched. Many of his soldiers were forced into the nearby Han River and drowned. The siege on Fancheng was then lifted.

== See also ==
- Head fake
- Ruse of war
- Military deception
- Telegraphing in sporting terminology, the unintentional act of giving away one's intention or planned actions to the opponent
