= Invasion of Banu Lahyan =

627 military campaign in the early Muslim period

Date	September, 627 AD in Rabi' Al-Awwal or Jumada Al-Ula, 6 AH
Location	Batn Gharran
Result	Muslim victory: Banu Lahyan tribe members escape

Belligerents
First Islamic State	Banu Lahyan

Commanders and leaders
Muhammad	Unknown

Strength
200	Unknown

The Invasion of Banu Lahyan took place in September, 627 AD in Rabi' al-awwal or Jumada Al-Awwal, 6 AH of the Islamic calendar .

== Background ==
The Islamic prophet Muhammad wanted to get justice for the killing of 10 Muslims in Expedition of Al Raji. The Banu Lahyan were situated deep in the heart of Hijaz on the borders of Mecca, and due to deep-seated blood-revenge between the Muslims on the one hand, and Quraish and the Arabians on the other.

When the power of the allied Confederates collapsed and they began to slacken and resign to the current unfavourable balance of power, Muhammad seized this rare opportunity and decided that it was time to take justice on Banu Lahyan.

== Invasion ==
Muhammad set out in Rabi‘ Al-Awwal or Jumada Al-Ula in the year six Hijri (July 627 AD) with 200 Muslim fighters and made a feint of heading for Syria, then soon changed route towards Batn Gharran, the scene of where 10 Muslims were killed in the Expedition of Al Raji. Bani Lahyan were on Alert and got the news of his march, the tribe then immediately fled to the mountain tops nearby and thus remained out of his reach. On his way back, Muhammad despatched a group of ten horsemen to a place called Kura‘ Al-Ghamim, in the vicinity of the habitation of Quraish in order to indirectly confirm his growing military power. All these skirmishes took 14 days, after which he left back for home.

== Islamic sources ==
=== Hadith literature ===
The event is mentioned in the Sahih Muslim hadith collection:

It has been narrated (through a still different chain of transmitters) on the authority of Abu Sa'id Khudrl that the Messenger of Allah (may peace be upon him) despatched a force to Banu Lihyan. (and said: ) One man from every two should join the force. Then he said to those who stayed behind: Those of you who will look well after the family and wealth of those who are going on the expedition will be getting half the reward of the warriors.Sahih Muslim, 20:4672

== See also ==
- List of battles of Muhammad
- Military career of Muhammad
- Muslim–Quraysh War
- Banu Quraysh
