= Batn Gharran =

Batn Gharran was a location in Saudi Arabia during the Islamic Prophet Muhammad's era. Muhammad ordered the Invasion of Banu Lahyan which took place here. Muhammad set out in Rabi‘ Al-Awwal or Jumada Al-Ula in the year six Hijri (July 627 A.D) with 200 Muslim fighters and made a feint of heading for Syria, then soon changed route towards Batn Gharran, the scene of where 10 Muslims were killed in the Expedition of Al Raji.

== See also ==
- List of battles of Muhammad
