= Al-Raji =

Location near al-Najdiyya, Saudi Arabia

Al-Raji is a location in Saudi Arabia near al-Najdiyya. During the Islamic Prophet Muhammad's era the Expedition of Al Raji took place here. Some men requested that Muhammad send instructors to teach them Islam, but the men were bribed by the two tribes of Khuzaymah who wanted revenge for the assassination of Khalid bin Sufyan by Muhammad's followers. According to William Montgomery Watt, the seven men Muhammad sent may have been spies for Muhammad and instructors for Arab tribes. Watt's claim that they were spies and not missionaries is mentioned in the Sunni hadith collection Sahih al-Bukhari

== See also ==
- List of expeditions of Muhammad
