= Khalid ibn Sufyan al-Hudhali =

Khalid ibn Sufyan al-Hudhali (Arabic: خالد بن سفيان الهذلي) belonged to the Banu Lahyan tribe at the time of the Islamic Prophet Muhammad. Muhammad said that Khalid was planning on attacking Madinah and instructed the people of Nakhla and Uranah to attack him in return [Sunan Abu Dawud 1249]. Therefore, he sent Abdullah ibn Unais to assassinate him in 625 during the Expedition of Abdullah Ibn Unais.

Abdullah ibn Unais found Hudayr in the company of his wife, when asked about his identity. Unais replied:

"I am an Arab tribesman who has heard of you and the Army you are raising to fight Muhammad, so I have come to join your ranks."

Sufyan ibn Khalid trusted him. Then Unais asked to talk to him privately, once, while conversing, Abdullah ibn Unais walked a short distance with ibn Khalid, and when an opportunity came he struck him with his sword and killed him. After killing ibn Khalid, he cut off his head, brought that to Muhammad, Muhammad gave him his staff as a reward and said:

This will function as a sign of recognition for you and me, on the day of resurrection Musnad Ahmad 3:496

This assassination had the effect of silencing the Banu Lahyan, for some time. But another branch of Banu Lahyan wanted to take revenge for the killing of their leader, Khalid ibn Sufyan, and were thinking of the means to do so.

== See also ==
- List of battles of Muhammad
