= Bilal ibn Rabah =

Companion of Prophet Muhammad and first Islamic mu'azzin (c. 580–640)

Bilāl بِلَال
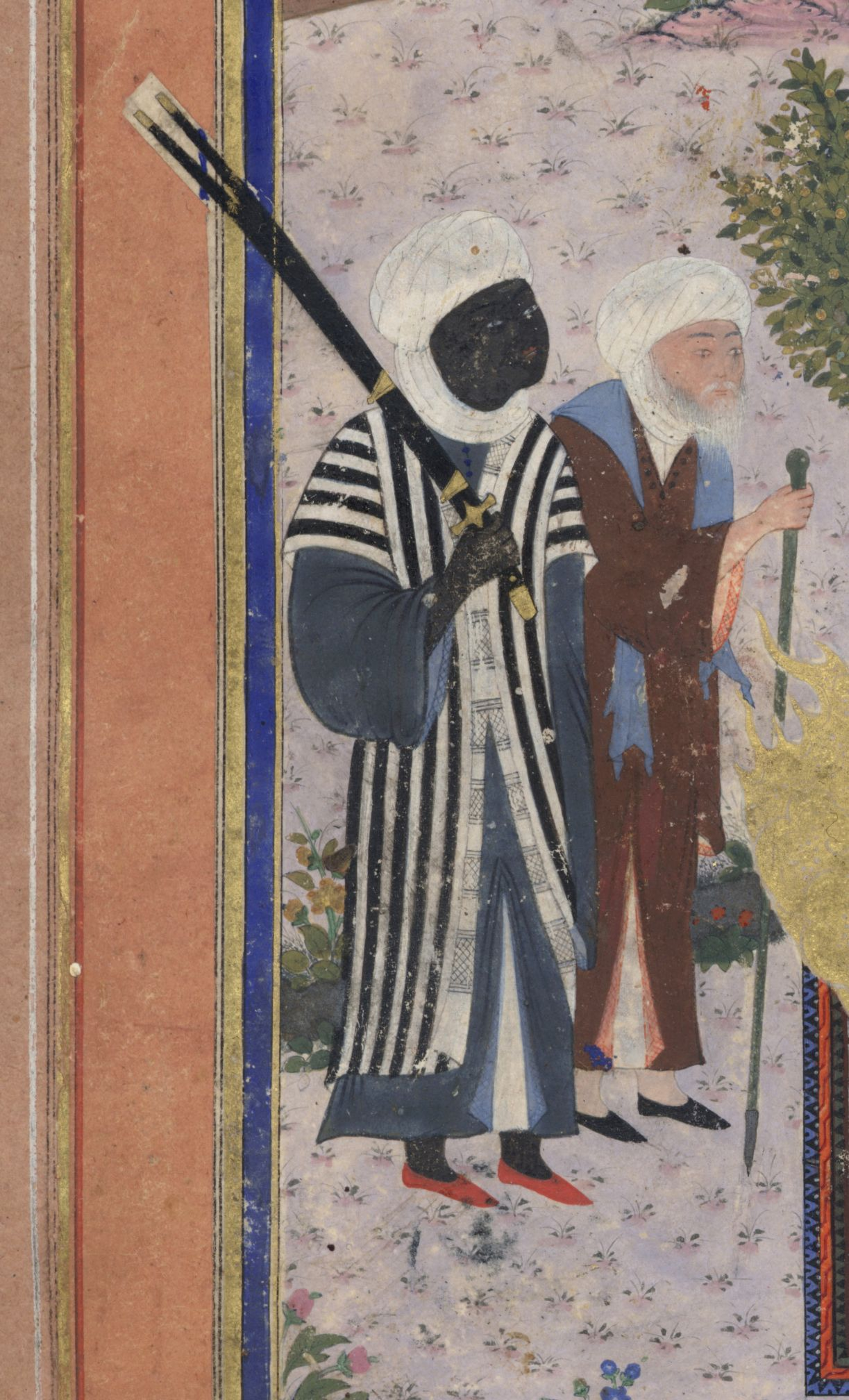
- 15th Islamic miniature depicting Bilal (left) from Musa va 'Uj
- Title: Sayyid-ul-Mu'azzinun

Personal life
- Born: Bilāl ibn Rabāḥ بلال بن رباح; 5 March, 580 Mecca, Hejaz, Arabia (present-day KSA)
- Died: 2 March 640 (aged 59) (Dhu al-Hijjah 19 AH) Damascus, Bilad al-Sham, Rashidun Caliphate (present-day Syria)
- Resting place: Bab al-Saghir Cemetery, Damascus
- Parent(s): Rabah (father); Hamamah (mother)
- Known for: First Mu'azzin appointed by the Prophet Muhammad

Religious life
- Religion: Islam
- Lineage: Banu Jumah (disputed)

Bilal ibn Rabah (Arabic: بِلَال بْن رَبَاح, romanized: Bilāl ibn Rabāḥ; 5 March 580 – 2 March 640 CE), also known as Bilāl al-Ḥabashī or simply Bilal, was a close companion of the Islamic prophet Muhammad. Born in Mecca, he was formerly enslaved. He is considered the first muʾazzin (caller to prayer) in Islam, personally chosen by Muhammad for his deep and melodious voice. He is often regarded as the first African or Black Muslim.

== Birth and early life ==
Bilal ibn Rabah was born in Mecca in the Hejaz in the year 580. There are differing accounts to the racial identity of his father according to historians. One account states that his father was an Abyssinian prisoner of war who had been given the name of Rabah, in Arabic meaning profitable, he had been handed over as a slave to the Quraishi Arab clan of Banu Jumah, this account is highly contested. Another account states that Bilal's father Rabah was in reality just an Arab who had been taken as a slave and given to the Banu Jumah for service, with some saying that Rabah was actually from the Banu Jumah itself but had somehow become a slave, while some maintain that Rabah was not even a slave and just so happened to have a child with an Abyssinian slave which was very frequent amongst Arabs of higher standing. Yet Bilal was born as a slave as slave-status is determined by the mother in Mecca. The notion of Bilal's father being of Arab ethnicity is further supported by the fact that Bilal was derogatorily called 'Ibn Sawda', son of the black woman by the nobles of the Quraish. Should the nobles of the Quraish have simply wanted to belittle him for being of an African background, they would have simply made of his race, not his mother as in Arab custom, ethnicity is determined by the father, indicating that his father Rabah was an Arab by race and not an Abyssinian captured as a war prisoner, supporting the latter opinion. It is unclear whether Rabah was a Quraishi of Banu Jumah or just an Arab slave from a different clan with some saying that Rabah was an Arab descended from the tribes settled in Abyssinia for trade purposes. However, this can be challenged by the fact that Bilal was seen as an Abyssinian by historians but other notable people such as Usama bin Zayd who are considered as Arab despite having an Abyssinian slave mother, favouring the former account. This in turn can be opined as being a confusion as since Bilal was a slave of Abyssinian origin on his maternal side, the nobles of the Quraish, his owners refused to acknowledge him as a fellow Arab due to the longstanding political discord between the people of Arabia and Abyssinia, especially after the sack of the Kaaba by the Abyssinian army. His mother Hamamah, was a princess of Abyssinia who was captured and enslaved after the event of the Year of the Elephant. Being born into slavery, Bilal had no other option but to work for his master, Umayyah ibn Khalaf. Through hard work, Bilal became recognised as a good slave and was entrusted with the keys to the Idols of Arabia. However, racism and sociopolitical statutes of Arabia prevented Bilal from achieving a great position in society.

== Bilal's appearance ==
In his book, Bilal ibn Rabah, Muhammad Abdi-Rauf states that Bilal "was of a handsome and impressive stature, dark complexion with sparkling eyes, a fine nose and bright skin. He was also gifted with a deep, melodious, resonant voice. He wore a beard which was thin on both cheeks. He was endowed with great wisdom and a sense of dignity and self esteem." Similarly, in his book The Life of Mahomet, William Muir states that Bilal "was tall, dark, and with African feature and bushy hair." A source states that Bilal had a nose described as 'ajna', meaning as being a raised nose with hair that was thick and not curly, and eyes that were sparkling and hazel-colored. His skin was described as being 'adam shadid al-udmah', extremely dark brown. Bilal's Arabic appearance of having a raised nose, bushy thick non-curly hair with slightly lightly colored eyes, yet having been very strongly built with his chest being prominent, raised height, dark-skinned, features associated with having African ancestry can be attributed to the fact that his father Rabah was an Arab, and his mother Hamamah was an Abyssinian. Muir also states that noble members of the Quraysh despised Bilal and called him "Ibn Sawda" meaning, son of the black woman.

== Conversion to Islam ==
When Muhammad announced his prophethood and started to proselytize, Bilal renounced idolatry, becoming one of the earliest converts to the faith. Incensed at Bilal's refusal, Umayyah ordered that Bilal be whipped and beaten while spread-eagled upon the Arabian sands under the desert sun, his limbs bound to stakes.

=== Torture by Umayyah ===
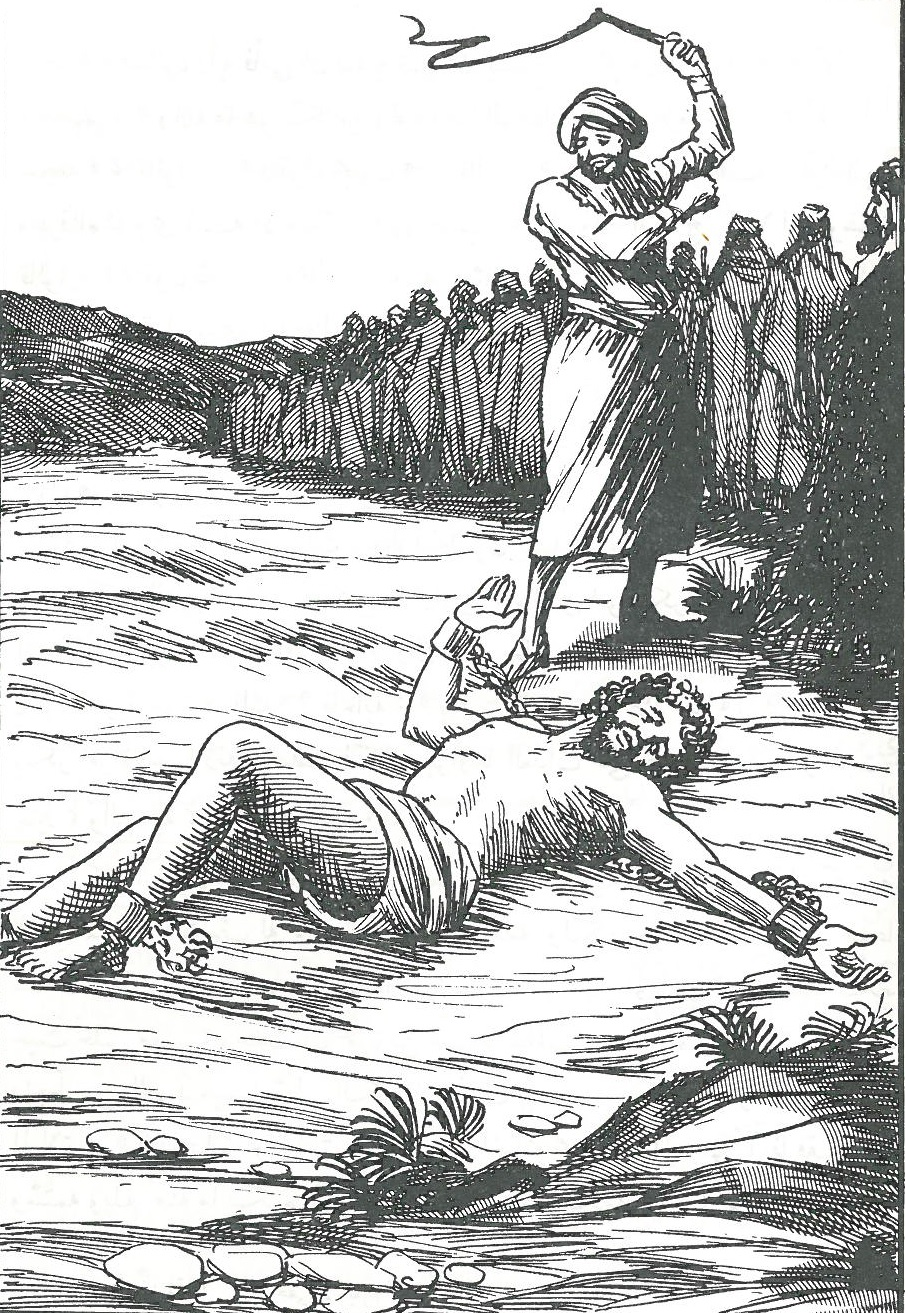
Bilal ibn Rabah being whipped after he declared his Islamic faith

When Bilal's master, Umayyah ibn Khalaf, found out about his faith, he began to torture Bilal. He put a big rock with iron on top on his chest. The iron was so that the sun's heat reaches him. But he did not give up on his new religion. He had great faith. At the instigation of Abu Jahl, Umayyah bound Bilal and had him dragged around Mecca as children mocked him. Bilal refused to renounce Islam, instead repeating "ahad, ahad" meaning one, one, i.e., one God. Incensed at Bilal's refusal, Umayyah ordered that Bilal be whipped and beaten while spread-eagled upon the Arabian sands under the desert sun, his limbs bound to stakes. When Bilal still refused to recant, Umayyah ordered that a hot boulder be placed on Bilal's chest. However, Bilal remained firm in belief and continued to say "ahad, ahad".

=== Emancipation ===
News of the persecution of Bilal reached some of Muhammad's companions, who informed him. Muhammad sent Abu Bakr to negotiate for the emancipation of Bilal, who manumitted him after either purchasing him or exchanging him for coins.

== Bilal in Medina ==
In the newly formed Islamic state of Medina, Bilal had become a prominent contributing member of the Muslim society taking on important roles.

=== Adhan ===
Muhammad chose Bilal as the first mu'azzin (reciter of the Adhan).

==== Sunni view ====
The majority of mosques around the world recite the Athan according to the Sunni tradition. A dream was seen by Abdullah ibn Zaid where an angel in the form of a man wearing a green garment taught the words of the adhan. Muhammad then instructed Abdullah to teach those words to Bilal because he had a louder voice than him. Umar ibn al-Khattab also saw the same dream. The detail of this story is mentioned below.

It is narrated in Sunan Ibn Majah that Abdullah ibn Zaid said the following:

The Messenger of Allah was thinking of a horn, and he commanded that a bell be made and it was done. Then 'Abdullah bin Zaid had a dream. He said: "I saw a man wearing two green garments, carrying a bell. I said to him, 'O slave of Allah, will you sell the bell?' He said; 'What will you do with it?' I said, 'I will call (the people) to prayer.' He said, 'Shall I not tell you of something better than that?' I said, 'What is it?' he said, 'Say:

Allahu Akbar Allahu Akbar, Allahu Akbar Allahu Akbar; (Allah is The Most Great, Allah is The Most Great)
Ash-hadu an la ilaha illallah, Ash-hadu an la ilaha illallah; (I bear witness that there is no god except Allah, I bear witness that there is no god except Allah.)
Ash-hadu anna Muhammadan Rasulullah, Ash-hadu anna Muhammadan Rasulullah; (I bear witness that Muhammed is the Messenger of Allah, I bear witness that Muhammed is the Messenger of Allah)
Hayya 'alas-salah, Hayya 'alas-salah; (Come to the Prayer, Come to the Prayer)
Hayya 'alal-falah, Hayya 'alal-falah; (Come to the prosperity, Come to the prosperity)
Allahu Akbar Allahu Akbar; (Allah is the Most great, Allah is the Most Great)
La ilaha illallah (There is no god except Allah)."

'Abdullah bin Zaid went out and came to the Messenger of Allah, and told him what he had seen. He said, "O Messenger of Allah, I saw a man wearing two green garments carrying a bell," and he told him the story. The Messenger of Allah said, "Your companion has had a dream. Go out with Bilal to the mosque and teach it to him, for he has a louder voice than you." I ('Abdullah) went out with Bilal to the mosque, and I started teaching him the words and he was calling them out. 'Umar Al-Khattab heard the voice and came out saying, "O Messenger of Allah! By Allah, I saw the same (dream) as him." (Hasan) Abu 'Ubaid said: "Abu Bakr Al-Hakami told me that 'Abdullah bin Zaid Al-Ansari said concerning that: 'I praise Allah, the Possessor of majesty and honor, A great deal of praise for the Adhan. Since the news of it came to me from Allah, So due to it, I was honored by the information. During the three nights. Each of which increased me in honor.'"

==== Shia view ====
Shias, in contrast, do not accept Abdullah ibn Ziyad's story. They state that the Adhan was revealed to Muhammad just as the Qur'an al-Majid was revealed to him. Shias believe that the Adhan could not be left to the dreams or reveries. Furthermore, Sayed Ali Asgher Razwy states, "If the Prophet could teach the Muslims how to perform prostrations, and how, when, and what to say in each prayer, he could also teach them how and when to alert others before the time for each prayer." According to the Shia traditions, the angel who taught Muhammad how to perform ablutions preparatory to prayers and how to perform prayers also taught him the Adhan.

=== Treasury ===
Bilal rose to prominence in the Islamic community of Medina, as Muhammad appointed him minister of the Bayt al-Mal (treasury). In this capacity, Bilal distributed funds to widows, orphans, wayfarers, and others who could not support themselves.

== Military campaigns during Muhammad's era ==
He participated in the Battle of Badr. Muhammad's forces included Ali ibn Abi Talib, Hamza ibn Abd al-Muttalib, Ammar ibn Yasir, Abu Dharr al-Ghifari, Abu Bakr, Umar, Mus`ab ibn `Umair, and Az-Zubair bin Al-'Awwam. The Muslims also brought seventy camels and two horses, meaning that they either had to walk or fit three to four men per camel. However, many early Muslim sources indicate that no serious fighting was expected, and the future Caliph Uthman stayed behind to care for his sick wife Ruqayyah, the daughter of Muhammad. Salman the Persian also could not join the battle, as he was still not a free man.

== Conquest of Makkah ==
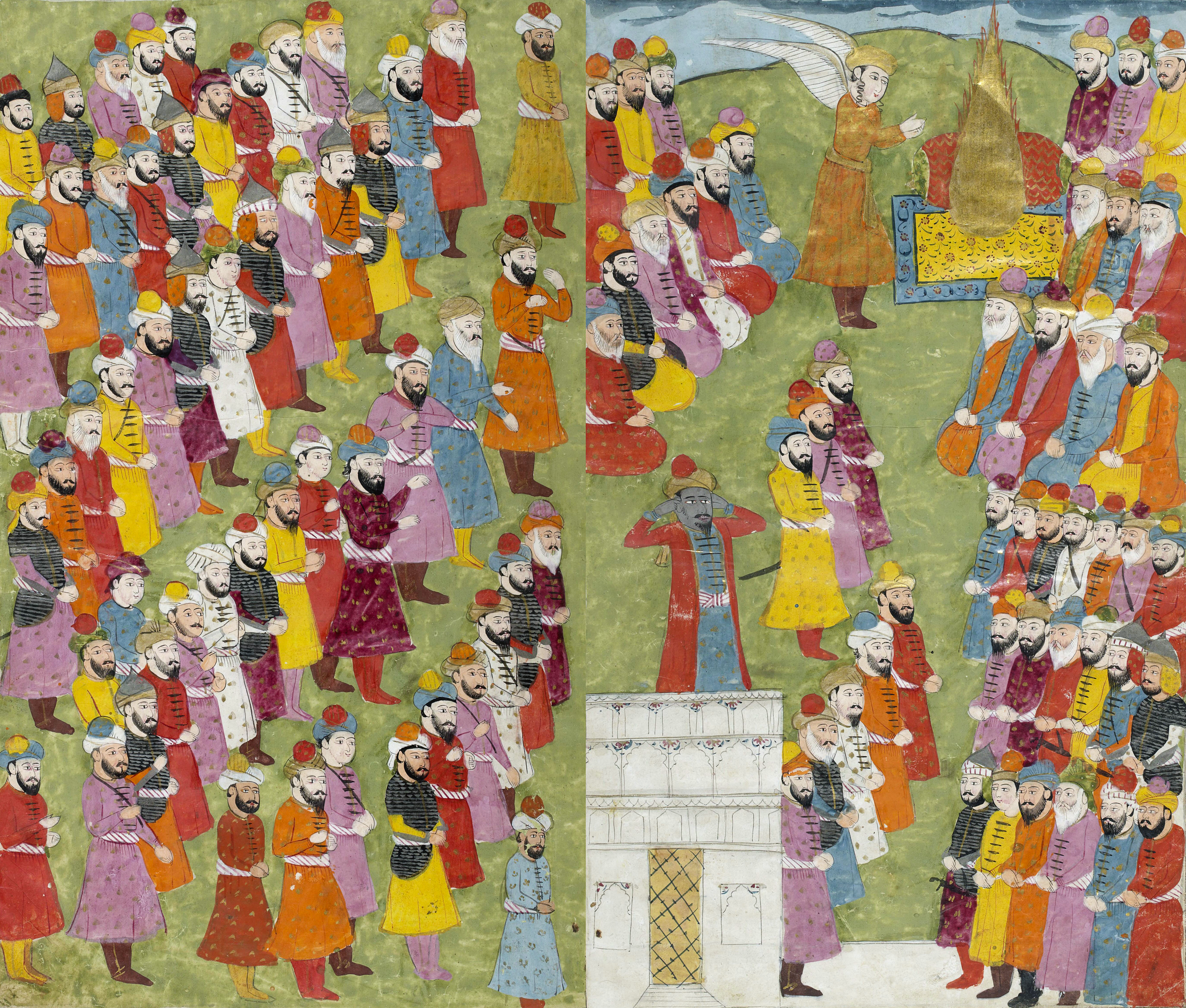
Islamic miniature depicting Jibril providing instructions on how to perform the call to prayer to Muhammad (golden flame) as well as Bilal ibn Rabah the first muezzin calling the Muslims to prayer from atop the Kaaba

During the Conquest of Makkah in 630 CE, Bilal played a significant role in the events that marked the triumph of Islam in the city. As one of Muhammad’s closest companions, Bilal was chosen to perform the adhan (call to prayer) from the Kaaba after the city was peacefully captured by the Muslim forces. Bilal's act of calling the adhan from the Kaaba is a historic moment, symbolizing the end of idolatry in Makkah and the establishment of Islam as the central faith in the region. His association with the adhan, which he had famously recited during the early days of Islam, now took on an even greater significance as it marked a moment of Muslim victory and the peaceful conquest of Makkah.

Ibn Kathir mentioned in Al-Bidayah wan-Nihayah from Malik ibn Anas states:

The Messenger of Allah, sallallaahu ‘alayhi wa sallam, ordered Bilal to call the azan on the day of the Conquest on top of the Ka'bah, so a man from Quraysh said to Al-Harith ibn Hisham, "Do you not see unto where this slave has ascended?" He said, "Leave him, for if Allah dislikes it, He will change it."

Bilal's role in the Conquest of Makkah was not just symbolic; it also represented the recognition of his loyalty and dedication to the faith from its earliest days, despite the hardships he had endured as a slave in Makkah. This momentous occasion is often remembered as one of the most significant events in early Islamic history.

== His piety ==
Bilal was among the sahabah promised Paradise in this world, as mentioned in the story of his footsteps being heard in paradise.

At the time of the Fajr prayer the Prophet (ﷺ) asked Bilal, "Tell me of the best deed you did after embracing Islam, for I heard your footsteps in front of me in Paradise." Bilal replied, "I did not do anything worth mentioning except that whenever I performed ablution during the day or night, I prayed after that ablution as much as was written for me."

== Poetry ==
Bilal reportedly recited the following poem in praise of Muhammad in his native Abyssinian language:

اَرَه بَرَهْ کَنْکَرَهْ
کِرَا کِرِی مِنْدَرَهْ

ara barah kankarah
kirā kirī mindarah
[When noble traits are described in our country,
thou art pointed out as a model among us.]

Alternatively, it has been claimed that this poem is actually in the Sindhi language and was written in praise of either Yahya al-Baramaki or his son Al-Fadl. However, the language of the poem does not match any known dialect of Sindhi.

== After Muhammad ==
=== Sunni view ===
In the Sīrat Abī Bakr Al-Ṣiddīq that compiled many narrations and compiled historical circumstances regarding the rule of Caliph Abu Bakr, Bilal accompanied the Muslim armies, under the commands of Said ibn Aamir al-Jumahi, to Syria.

Purnam Allahabadi, a Sufi poet from Pakistan, composed a Qawwali named Bhar Do Jholi Meri Ya Muhammad which was sung by Sabri Brothers in which he mentioned how time had stopped when some companions blocked Bilal from delivering the Adhan (which he had seen in his dream), and appealed that it was incorrect. Because the companion Bilal was of an Abyssinian origin, he could not pronounce the letter "Sh" (Arabic: Shin ش). A hadith of Muhammad reports that he said, "The 'seen' of Bilal is 'sheen' in the hearing of Allah," meaning God does not look at the external but appreciates the purity of heart.

=== Shia view ===
After Muhammad died in 632 CE, Bilal was one of the people who did not give bay'ah (the oath of allegiance) to Abu Bakr. It is documented that when Bilal did not give bay'ah to Abu Bakr, Umar ibn al-Khattab grabbed Bilal by his clothes and asked, "Is this the reward of Abu Bakr; he emancipated you and you are now refusing to pay allegiance to him?

Bilal replied, "If Abu Bakr had emancipated me for the pleasure of Allah, then let him leave me alone for Allah; and if he had emancipated me for his service, then I am ready to render him the services required. But I am not going to pay allegiance to a person whom the Messenger of God had not appointed as his caliph." Similarly, al-Isti'ab, a Sunni source, states that Bilal told Abu Bakr: "If you have emancipated me for yourself, then make me a captive again; but if you had emancipated me for Allah, then let me go in the way of Allah."

This was said when Bilal wanted to go for Jihad. Abu Bakr then let him go."

The following is a poem by Bilal on his refusal to give Abu Bakr bay'ah:

By Allah! I did not turn towards Abu Bakr,
If Allah had not protected me,
hyena would have stood on my limbs.
Allah has bestowed on me good
and honoured me,
Surely there is vast good with Allah.
You will not find me following an innovator,
Because I am not an innovator, as they are.

Being exiled from Medina by Umar and Abu Bakr, Bilal migrated to Syria.

Abu Ja'far al-Tusi, a Shia scholar, has also stated in lkhtiyar al-Rijal that Bilal refused to pay allegiance to Abu Bakr.

== Death ==
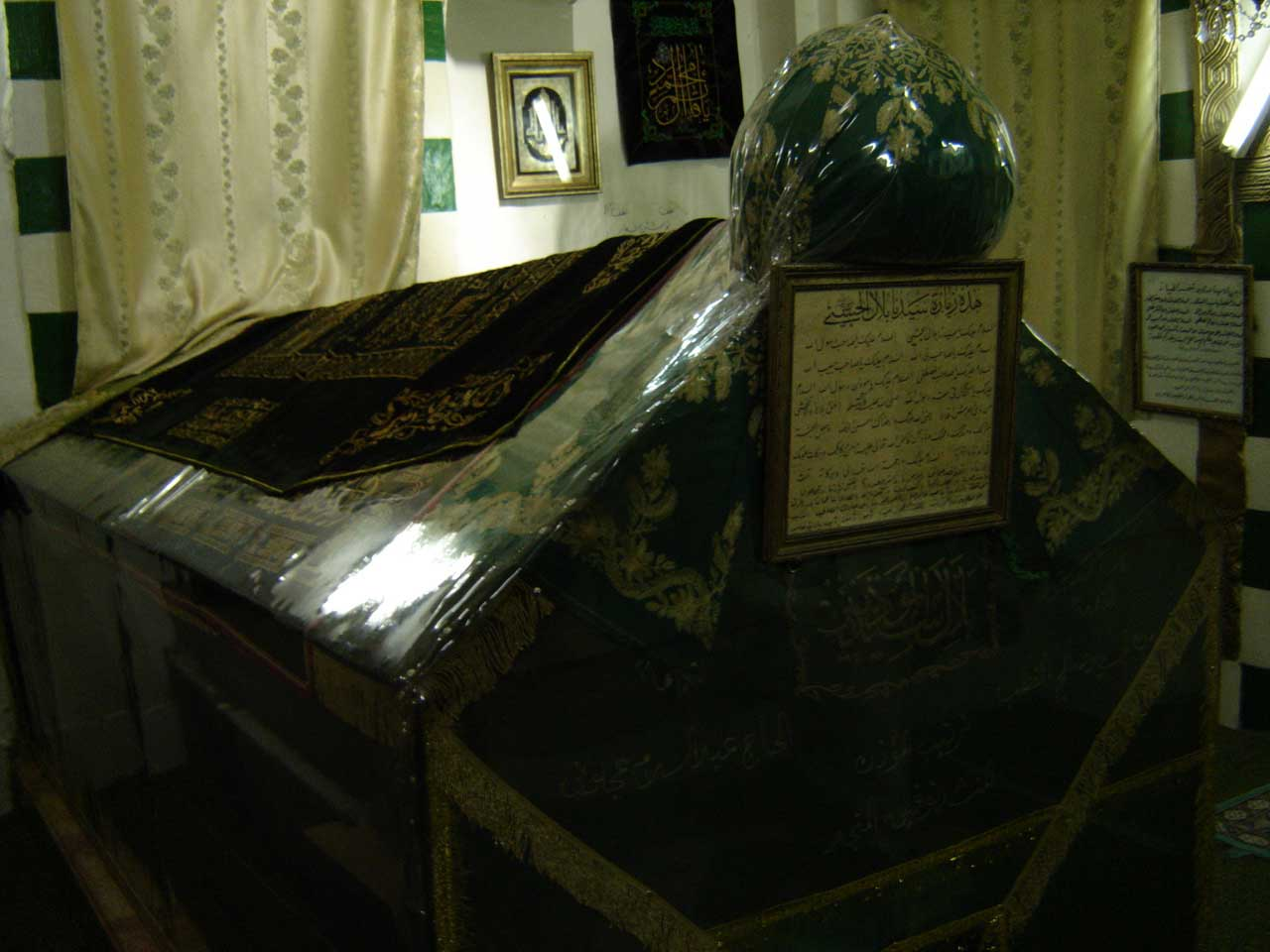
Grave of Bilal in Bab al-Saghir Cemetery, Damascus

The Sunni scholar al-Suyuti in his Tarikh al-khulafa wrote: "He (Bilal) died in Damascus in 17 or 18 AH, but some say 20 AH, or even 21 AH when he was just over sixty years old. Some said he died in Medina, but that is wrong. That is how it is in al-Isabah and other works such as the Tahdhib of an-Nawawi."

When Bilal's wife realized that death was approaching Bilal, she became sorrowful. It is documented that she cried and said, "What a painful affliction!" However, Bilal objected to his wife's opinion by stating, "On the contrary, what a happy occasion! Tomorrow I will meet my beloved Muhammad and his faction (hizb)!"

He is believed to have been buried in the Bab al-Saghir cemetery, Damascus. However, there exists another shrine, believed to be the burial of Bilal, near a small village called al-Rabahiyya, in Amman, Jordan.

== Descendants and legacy ==
The descendants of Bilal ibn Rabah al-Habashi are said to have migrated to the land of Ethiopia in East Africa. The Keita dynasty who ruled the Empire of Mali in West Africa also claimed descent from him. According to Mali oral tradition "Bilali Bounama" had seven sons and the oldest Lawalo migrated to Mali. In Morocco, Bilal became the patron saint and mythological ancestor of the Gnawa. In Essaouira, they built the shrine Zawiya Sidna Bilal despite him being buried in Syria. Because of this, they also venerate local saints.

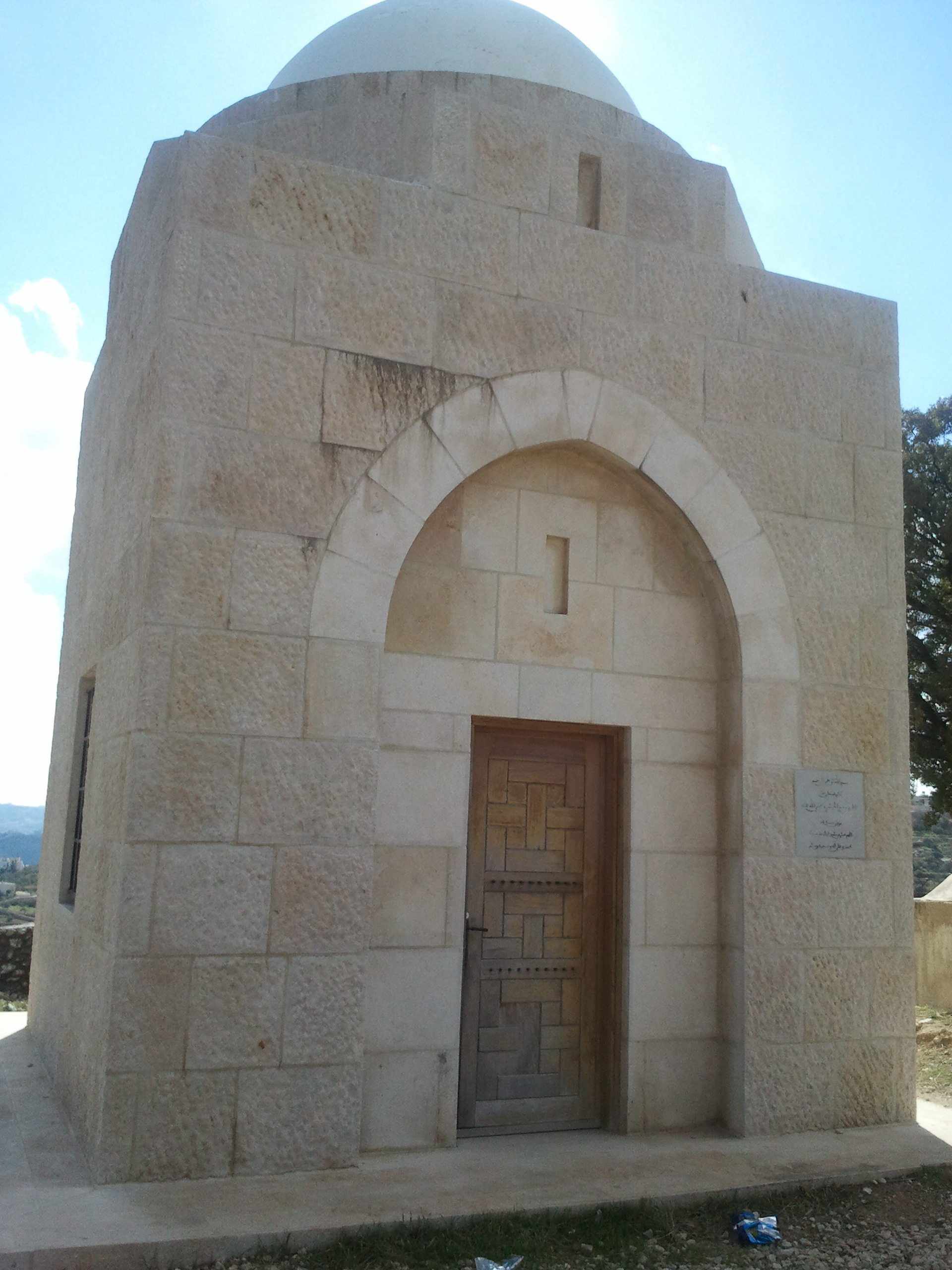
Another alleged tomb of Bilal in Amman, Jordan

Though there are some disagreements concerning the hard facts of Bilal's life and death, his importance on a number of levels is incontestable. Mu'azzins, especially those in Turkey and Africa, have traditionally venerated the original practitioner of their profession. The story of Bilal is the most frequently cited demonstration of Islam measuring people not by their nationality nor social status nor race, but by their Taqwah (piety).

In 1874, Edward Wilmot Blyden, a former slave of African descent, wrote: "The eloquent Adzan or Call to Prayer, which to this day summons at the same hours millions of the human race to their devotions, was first uttered by a Negro, Bilal by name, whom Mohammed, in obedience to a dream, appointed the first Mu'azzin. And it has been remarked that even Alexander the Great is in Asia an unknown personage by the side of this honoured Negro."

== See also ==
- Zayd ibn Harithah
- Abdullah ibn Umm-Maktum
- List of expeditions of Muhammad
- Bilal: A New Breed of Hero, a 2015 animated film about Bilal's life
