= Asim ibn Umar =

Son of Umar and hadith scholar (c.628–c.689)

- عاصم بن عمر

Personal life
- Born: c. 628 CE Medina, Hejaz, Arabia
- Died: c. 689 CE Medina, Umayyad Caliphate
- Resting place: Medina
- Children: Hafs ibn Asim, Umar ibn Asim, see more below
- Parents: Umar ibn al-Khattab (father); Jamila bint Thabit (mother)
- Era: Islamic golden age
- Known for: Senior Tabi‘in and one of the narrators of hadith

Religious life
- Religion: Islam

Asim ibn Umar ibn al-Khattab (Arabic: عَاصِم بْنُ عُمَرَ بْنُ الْخَطَّاب, romanized: ʿĀṣim ibn ʿUmar ibn al-Khaṭṭāb; c. 628–c. 689) was the son of Jamila bint Thabit and Umar ibn al-Khattab, the second Rashidun caliph. Asim was a famous early hadith scholar.

Asim was also a Army soldier. As a soldier, He participated in military campaigns of the Caliphate, including the early Arab conquests in Maghreb, Battle of Sufetula in 647.

== Biography ==
Asim was the son of Umar ibn al-Khattab, the senior companion of Muhammad; his mother was also one of the companions.

His father, Umar was born in Mecca to the Banu Adi clan, which was responsible for arbitration among the tribes. His mother, Jamila was the daughter of Thabit ibn Abi al-Aqlah and Al-Shamus bint Abi Amir, who were both from the 'Amr ibn Awf clan of the Aws tribe in Medina. Her brother Asim was among those who fought at Badr.

His mother, Jamila, was one of Medina's first converts to Islam. She and her mother were among the first ten women to pledge allegiance to Muhammad in 622. On hearing that her name was Asiya ("disobedient"), Muhammad renamed her: "No, you are Jamila" ("beautiful").

She married Umar about five years later, between May 627 and May 628. They had one son, Asim ibn Umar. On one occasion, Jamila asked Umar for money, and, as he afterwards reported to Muhammad: "I slapped her with a blow that floored her, because she asked me for what I did not have."

The marriage ended in divorce. Jamila and Asim returned to her family in the suburb of Quba. One day Umar arrived in Quba and saw Asim playing in the mosque courtyard. He picked him up and placed him on his mount. Jamila's mother Al-Shamus saw that Umar was taking her grandson away and came up to protest. They could not agree who should have custody of Asim and so they brought their dispute before Abu Bakr. When Abu Bakr ruled, "Do not interfere between a child and its mother," Umar dropped his case and allowed Jamila to keep her son.

Later Jamila was married to Yazid ibn Jariya, and they had one son, Abd al-Rahman. Thus, Asim had a Maternal half-brother from his mother.

Asim was four years old when Muhammad died and he was almost six or seven when caliph Abu Bakr al-Siddiq died. After the death of Abu Bakr (died 634) his father became the next Caliph.

=== Events in his life ===
His father became caliph in 634. Under Umar, the caliphate expanded at an unprecedented rate, ruling the Sasanian Empire and more than two-thirds of the Byzantine Empire. his father became most powerful and influential Muslim caliphs in history. However at the height of his power, In 644, Umar was assassinated by a Persian slave named Abu Lu'lu'a Firuz. His motivations for the assassination are not clear. Asim was a very young man when his father died.

After his father's death, Muslim community selected Uthman, who ruled from 644 until his assassination in 17 June 656. During Uthman's caliphate, Asim also participated in military campaigns, including the early Arab Muslim conquests in Magreb, fighting alongside his brothers Abd Allah and Ubayd Allah in the Battle of Sufetula in 647. Uthman was succeeded by Ali, who was selected as caliph in 656. He ruled until his assassination in 661. After the unfortunate death of Ali the Muslim community selected al-Hasan as the Caliph, however he abdicated the throne in favour of Mu'awiya ibn Abi Sufyan the governor of Syria, to end the civil war by a pact. Mu'awiya I was recognized as the new Caliph, this marked the end of Rashidun era and beginning of Umayyad era. Mu'awiya was succeeded by Yazid then by Mu'awiya II after that Marwan I in 684 became Caliph because of unexpected premature death of Mu'awiya II. Caliph Marwan was facing major political crisis, however Umayyads emerged victorious under him and his son Abd al-Malik.

Asim died during the early reign of Umayyad caliph Abd al-Malik in 689.

=== Legacy ===
Asim ibn Umar was one of the famous Tabi‘in and one of the notable narrators of hadith.

A hadith attributed to Malik from Yahya ibn Said reports:

A woman of the Ansar was married to Umar ibn al-Khattab. She bore Asim ibn Umar to him, and then he separated from her. Umar came to Quba and found his son Asim playing in the courtyard of the mosque. He took him by the arm and placed him before him on his mount. The grandmother of the child saw him and argued with Umar about the child so they went to Abu Bakr as-Siddiq. Umar said, 'My son.' The woman said, 'My son.' Abu Bakr said, 'Do not interfere between a child and its mother.' Umar did not repeat his words. Yahya said that he heard Malik say, "This is what I would have done in that situation.

== Family ==
Among his children are:

- Hafs ibn Asim, who in Sahih al-Bukhari alone relates eleven hadith.
- Umar ibn Asim, had a daughter named Umm Miskin bint Umar. She had a freed slave named "Abu Malik"
- Umm Asim Layla bint Asim, the mother of Umar II, the eight Umayyad Caliph.
