= Jamila bint Thabit =

Companion of Muhammad

Jamila bint Thabit جميلة بنت ثابت
- Born: Medina, Hejaz
- Died: Medina, Hejaz
- Other names: bint Thabit; Asiya
- Spouses: Umar (divorced. 629); Yazid ibn Jariya
- Children: Asim ibn Umar; Abd al-Rahman ibn Yazid
- Parents: Thabit ibn Abi al-Aqlah (father); Al-Shamus bint Abi Amir (mother)
- Relatives: Asim ibn Thabit (brother)
- Family: Banu Aws (tribe)

Jamīla bint Thābit (Arabic: جميلة بنت ثابت), originally named ʿĀṣiya (Arabic: عاصية), was a wife of Umar. She was among the disciples (known in Arabic as Sahaba or companions) of Islamic prophet Muhammad.

== Biography ==
She was the daughter of Thabit ibn Abi al-Aqlah and al-Shamus bint Abi Amir, who were both from the 'Amr ibn Awf clan of the Aws tribe in Medina. Her brother Asim was among those who fought at Badr.

Jamila was one of Medina's first converts to Islam. She and her mother were among the first ten women to pledge allegiance to Muhammad in 622 CE. On hearing that her name was Asiya ("disobedient"), Muhammad renamed her: "No, you are Jamila" ("beautiful").

She married Umar about five years later, between May 627 and May 628. They had one son, Asim. On one occasion, Jamila asked Umar for money, and, as he afterwards reported to Muhammad: "I slapped her with a blow that floored her, because she asked me for what I did not have." The marriage ended in divorce.

Jamila and Asim returned to her family in the suburb of Quba. One day Umar arrived in Quba and saw Asim playing in the mosque courtyard. He picked him up and placed him on his mount. Jamila's mother Al-Shamus saw that Umar was taking her grandson away and came up to protest. They could not agree who should have custody of Asim and so they brought their dispute before Abu Bakr. When Abu Bakr ruled, "Do not interfere between a child and its mother," Umar dropped his case and allowed Jamila to keep her son.

Later Jamila was married to Yazid ibn Jariya, and they had one son, Abd al-Rahman.
