= Head fake =

Type of feint in sports in which a change in direction is faked with a head movement

In sports, a head fake is a type of feint in which someone moves the head to fake an intended change in direction and thereby deceive opponents.

The term originated in sports, but it has become applied metaphorically in other senses. In financial markets, a "head fake" refers to a time when the market appears to be moving in one direction, but ends up moving in the opposite direction. For example, the price of a stock may initially move up, and all indications are that it will continue to move up, but shortly afterward, it reverses direction and starts moving down.

On September 18, 2007, in his "Last Lecture" at Carnegie Mellon University, entitled "Really Achieving Your Childhood Dreams", Randy Pausch referred extensively to "head fakes". He described as a "head fake", for example, the phenomenon of parents encouraging their children to play football. Parents tell their children to play sports not because they really want them to become football stars, he said, but to help them develop collaboration and socializing skills.

== See also ==
- Pump and dump
