= Uqba ibn al-Harith =

Uqba ibn al-Harith (Arabic: عقبة بن الحارث) was a companion of Muhammad, but used to be an enemy of him when he was a Pagan. According to the Muslim scholar Safiur Rahman Mubarakpuri, when he was still a Pagan, the Quraysh ordered Khubayb bin ‘Adiy to be crucified by Uqba ibn al-Harith during the Expedition of Al Raji, because he had killed Uqba ibn al-Harith's father.

The killing of Khubyab bin Adi by Uqba ibn al-Harith is mentioned in Sahih al-Bukhari as follows:

The person who killed Khubaib was Abu Sarua (i.e. 'Uqba bin Al-Harith). Sahih al-Bukhari, 5:59:413

== See also ==
- List of battles of Muhammad
