= Ibn Umm Maktum =

Companion (Sahabi) of Muhammad

Abdullah ibn Umm-Maktum (Arabic: عبد الله بن أم مكتوم) (died 636) was a companion of Islamic prophet Muhammad, and one of the two muezzins of Medina. In some traditions his name has also appeared as `Amr ibn Umm-Maktum. The first verses of Abasa, the 80th chapter of Qur'an, are considered to be revealed in an incident connected to him.

== Biography ==
Abdullah Ibn Umm-Maktum was the son of Qays Ibn Zayd and Aatikah Bint Abdullah. He was blind by birth and hence his mother was called Umm-Maktum (Mother of the concealed one). Ibn Umm-Maktum was a cousin of Khadijah bint Khuwaylid, Muhammad's first wife.

Abdullah Ibn Umm-Maktum was among the first converts to Islam. Muhammad sent him and Mus`ab ibn `Umair to Medina for teaching Qur'an to the inhabitants before the Hijra took place. He and Bilal Ibn Rabah were chosen as muezzins in Medina by Muhammad. When Muhammad left Medina for participating in battles, he was given the responsibility of leading the prayers.

Abdullah Ibn Umm-Maktum requested Umar, the second Caliph of Islam, to let him take part in Jihad in spite of his blindness. Umar allowed him to take part in the Battle of al-Qadisiyyah in 636 C.E. He served in the battle as the standard bearer for the Muslim side, and he was martyred in the fighting.

== Qur'anic verses ==
According to traditional Sunni narration, the story behind the revelation of the first ten verses of Abasa is as follows : Muhammad was preaching Islam to Walid ibn al-Mughira and other Quraysh chieftains in Mecca. Abdullah ibn Umm Maktum came along and asked Muhammad about something. Muhammad did not want to turn his attention away from the chieftains and frowned at ibn Umm Maktum. Allah admonished Muhammad for this action via the first ten verses of Abasa :

(The Prophet) frowned and turned away, because there came to him the blind man (interrupting)...

After this incident, Muhammad used to greet Abdullah ibn Umm-Maktum thus :

Welcome to him on whose account my Sustainer has rebuked me.

However, Shias and Sufis do not agree that the verses were admonishing Muhammad. The Shia do not accept the authenticity of the hadith either.

Another verse based on an incident involving ibn Umm-Maktum is the 95th verse of An-Nisa. As related by Ibn Kathir in his exegesis of the Qur'an, Al-Bukhari recorded that Sahl bin Sa`d As-Sa`di said, "I saw Marwan bin Al-Hakam sitting in the Masjid. I came and sat by his side. He told us that Zayd bin Thabit told him that Allah's Messenger dictated this Ayah to him, Not equal are those believers who sit (at home) and those who strive and fight in the Cause of Allah. Ibn Umm Maktum came to the Prophet as he was dictating that very Ayah to me. Ibn Umm Maktum said, `O Allah's Messenger! By Allah, if I had power, I would surely take part in Jihad.' He was a blind man. So Allah sent down revelation to His Messenger while his thigh was on mine and it became so heavy for me that I feared that my thigh would be broken. That ended after Allah revealed, ... except those who are disabled and those who strive and fight in the cause of Allah.^{[Quran 4:95]}

== See also ==
- Bilāl al-Ḥabashī
