= Uranah =

Uranah is a location in Saudi Arabia. The Expedition of Abdullah Ibn Unais took place here in the year 625. Muhammad sent Abdullah ibn Unais to kill Khalid bin Sufyan, because there were reports he considered an attack on Madinah and that he was inciting the people on Nakhla or Uranah to fight Muslims.

During Hajj, Muhammad stopped at Uranah and gave a Khutbah (speech).

== See also ==
- List of battles of Muhammad
