= Rabi'a ibn Umayya ibn Khalaf =

Rabi'a ibn Umayya ibn Khalaf ibn Wahb ibn Hudhafa ibn Jumah al-Jumahi (Arabic: ربيعة بن أمية) was a companion (Arabic: Sahaba) of Muhammad. His father was Umayya ibn Khalaf, his mother was Karima bint Ma'mar ibn Habib, and his brother was Safwan ibn Umayya. He helped Muhammad in his The Farewell Sermon and was involved in an episode with during Umar's caliphate: A hadith attributed to Qurtubi from Abd-al-Rahman ibn Awf reports:

One night I went out with Omar Ibn Al-Khattab, may Allah be pleased with him, touring Al-Madina when we sighted a lamplight in a house whose facing door shut off some people with loud voices and clamour. "This is the house of Rabi'a Ibn Umayya, Ibn Khalaf, and they are now drinking; what do you think?" Asked Omar, may Allah be pleased with him, I said I think we have done what is prohibited by Allah; He said, highly glorified be He, (And espy not), but we have spied, upon which Omar turned away and left them.

Rabi'a ibn Umayya was also involved in the Hadith of Umar's speech of forbidding Mut'ah.

== See also ==
- Islam
