= Abasa =

80th chapter of the Qur'an

Surah 80 of the Quran
عبس ʻAbasa Frowned
- Qira'ah; English text
- Classification: Meccan
- Position: Juzʼ 30
- No. of verses: 42
- No. of words: 133
- No. of letters: 538

ʻAbasa (Arabic: عبس, Frowned' ) is the 80th chapter (sura) of the Qur'an, with 42 verses (ayat). It is a Meccan sura. The Surah is so designated after the word `abasa with which it opens. One of the main themes of the sura discusses the evilness of ableism, the marginalization faced by people with mental disorders and physical disabilities and the necessity of compassion for such vulnerable members of society.

== Summary ==
- 1-11 The Surah starts by disputing glaring on a blind person who came to prophet Mohammad PBUH.
- 12-15 The Quran written in honourable, exalted, and pure volumes
- 16-23 Man redeemed and questioned belief of equality of Man
- 24-32 It is God who provides man with food
- 33-37 On the judgment-day men will desert their nearest relatives and friends
- 38-42 The bright and sad faces of the resurrection-day

== Overview ==
The surah Abasa is one of the main Islamic sources addressing the topic of ableism. Because it is often interpreted as calling out a mistreatment of a disabled person by the Prophet Muhammad, it is frequently cited in discussions about whether the Prophet was infallible, or whether he was fully infallible.

== Period of revelation ==
=== Sunni perspective ===
According to traditional Sunni narration, the story behind the revelation of the first ten verses of the sura is as follows: Muhammad was preaching Islam to Walid ibn al-Mughira and other Quraysh chieftains in Mecca. Abdullah ibn Umm Maktum came along and asked Muhammad about something. Muhammad did not want to turn his attention away from the chieftains and frowned at ibn Umm Maktum. Allah admonished Muhammad for this action via the first ten verses of Abasa.

=== Shia perspective ===
The Shia interpretations are unanimous on the view that the person that frowned away was not Muhammad, but an elite from Banu Umayya. According to them, these verses were descended about the man from Banu Umayya who was sitting with Muhammad. At the same time, Abdullah bin Umm Maktum(Ibn Taymiyyah) entered, when the rich man saw the poverty stricken Abdullah he drew himself aside, not to get his dress dirty and contracted his facial expressions which got uneasy. In those verses God stated his acts and criticized and condemned them.

== The tenses of grammar used ==
The word used was Abasa, which tells hope 'He'. The Quran does not directly impose the frowning on Muhammad, instead it says "He cultivated triumph, in unponnosed visage of hope in blindness", making it widely open for interpretation.
