= Banu Jumah =

Sub-tribe of the Quraysh tribe

Banu Jumah (Arabic: بنو جُمح)
- Quraysh of the Banu Ismail
- Nisba: Jumahi
- Location: Arabia (Saudi Arabia)
- Descended from: Jumah ibn 'Amr ibn Husays ibn Ka'b ibn Lu'ayy
- Religion: Islam

Map of the Arabian Peninsula in 600 AD, showing the various Arab tribes and their areas of settlement. The Lakhmids (yellow) formed an Arab monarchy as clients of the Sasanian Empire, while the Ghassanids (red) formed an Arab monarchy as clients of the Roman Empire A map published by the British academic Harold Dixon during World War I, showing the presence of the Arab tribes in West Asia, 1914

The Banu Jumah (Arabic: بنو جُمح, romanized: Banū Jumaḥ) was an Arab clan of the Quraysh. They are notable for being allies to the polytheist Meccans and being in war with the Muslims. They are related to the Banu Sahm, as they both were part of a larger clan descended from the same ancestor, the Banu Husays.

In the Battle of the Camel, a group of Banu Jumah was with A'ishah, according to the Shia.

== People ==
- Umayya ibn Khalaf - head
- Safwan ibn Umayya (his son)
- Karima bint Ma'mar ibn Habib (his wife; mother of his children)
- Barza bint Masud (Safwan's wife; his daughter-in-law)
- Abdullah ibn Safwan (Safwan and Barza's son; his grandson)
- Hisham ibn Safwan (Safwan and Barza's son; his grandson)
- Umayya ibn Safwan (Safwan and Barza's son; his grandson)
- Umm Habib bint Safwan (Safwan and Barza's daughter; his granddaughter)
- Safwan ibn Abdullah (Abdullah ibn Safwan's son; his great-grandson)
- Amr ibn Adbullah (Safwan ibn Abdullah's brother; his great-grandson)
- Umayyah ibn Safwan (Safwan ibn Abdullah's son; his great-great-grandson)
- His sister (mother of Barza bint Masud)
- Rabah, Walid, Ali, Ahyah, Mas'ud, and Salamah ibn Umayya (Safwan's siblings)
- Usayd ibn Ahyah (Ahyah ibn Umayya's son; his grandson)
- Uthman ibn Mad'hun (his second cousin)
- Zainab bint Mad'hun (Uthman's sister; his second cousin)
- Qadamah ibn Mad'hun (Uthman's brother)
- Abdullah ibn Mad'hun (Uthman's brother)
- Sa'ib ibn Mad'hun (Uthman's brother)
- Qutilah bint Mad'hun (Uthman's sister)
- Wahb ibn Khalaf and Ubayy ibn Khalaf (his brothers)
- Hind bint Ubayy (Ubayy's daughter; his niece, and daughter-in-law; she married Mas'ud ibn Umayya)
- Zamm'a ibn Ubayy (Ubayy ibn Khalaf's son; his nephew)
- Abdullah ibn Ubayy (Ubayy ibn Khalaf's son; his nephew)
- Wahba bint Ubayy (Ubayy ibn Khalaf's daughter; his niece)
- Nashayd ibn Mas'ud (Mas'ud ibn Umayyah's son; his grandson)
- Ibrahim ibn Amir (Amir ibn Mas'ud's son; his great-grandson)
- Ali ibn Usayd (Usayd ibn Uhayha's son; his great-grandson)
- Umayr ibn Wahb (Wahb ibn Khalaf's son; his nephew)
- Wahb ibn Umayr (Umayr ibn Wahb's son; his great-nephew)
- Sufyan ibn Ma'mar (Karima bint Ma'mar ibn Habib's brother; his second cousin)
- Khawlah bint Hakim (his cousin-in-law; Uthman's wife)
- As-Sa'ib ibn Uthman (Uthman and Khawlah's son; his nephew)
- Yahya ibn Hakim
- Amir ibn Mas'ud (Masud ibn Umayya and Hind bint Ubayy's son; his grandson)
- Aws ibn Mi'yar
- Unays ibn Mi'yar (Aws' brother)
- Abd-al-Malik and Hudayr ibn Aws (Aws' sons)
- Ayyub ibn Habib
- Abu Azzah Amr bin Abd Allah al-Jumahi

== See also ==
- Islam
