= Safwan ibn Umayya =

Companion of Muhammad

- Born: Safwan ibn Umayya ibn Khalaf ibn Wahb ibn Hudhafa ibn Jumah al-Jumahi; Mecca, Hijaz, Arabia
- Died: 661; Mecca, Rashidun Caliphate or Umayyad Caliphate
- Spouse(s): Barza bint Mas'ud; Fakhita bint al-Walid al-Baghum bint al-Muadhdhil; Umm Kulthum bint Jarwal; Umayma bint Abi Sufyan
- Children: Abdullah the Elder; Hisham; Umayya; Abdullah the Younger; Umm Habib; Abdulrahman
- Relatives: Umayya ibn Khalaf (father); Karima bint Ma'mar (mother); Rabi'a ibn Umayya (brother); Umayr ibn Wahb (cousin); Banu Jumah (clan)
- Military career
- Allegiance: Mushrikites; Rashidun Caliphate
- Service years: 625–636
- Conflicts: Muslim–Mushrikite wars; Against Muslims: Battle of Uhud (625); Battle of the Trench (627); For Muslims: Battle of Hunayn (628); Muslim conquest of Syria; Battle of the Yarmuk (636)

Ṣafwān ibn Umayya ibn Khalaf ibn Wahb ibn Hudhafa ibn Jumah al-Jumahi (Arabic: صفوان بن أمية; died 661) was a sahabi (companion) of the Islamic prophet Muhammad.

== Family ==
He was from the Banu Jumah clan of the Quraysh in Mecca. His father was Umayya ibn Khalaf, one of the elders of the Quraysh; his mother was Karima bint Ma'mar ibn Habib. He had a paternal brother named Ali and a maternal brother named Jabala ibn al-Hanbal.

Safwan married at least five times.

1. Barza bint Mas'ud, from the ruling family of the Thaqif tribe in Ta'if. She was the daughter of his father's sister and the mother of his children, Abdullah "the Elder", Hisham ibn Safwan, Umayya ibn Safwan, and Umm Habib bint Safwan.
2. Fakhita bint Al-Walid ibn Al-Mughira, from the Makhzum clan of the Quraysh in Mecca.
3. al-Baghum bint al-Muadhdhil ibn Kinana. She was the mother of his son Abdullah "the Younger".
4. Umm Kulthum bint Jarwal (also known as Mulayka), from the Khuza'a tribe.
5. Umayma bint Abi Sufyan, from the Umayya clan of the Quraysh. She was the mother of his son Abdulrahman.

On request, he once loaned Muhammad 50,000 dirhams.

== Opposition to Muhammad and military campaigns ==
Safwan's father, Umayya ibn Khalaf, opposed Muhammad in Mecca. He was involved in the plot to assassinate Muhammad, after which Muhammad left for Medina. It was only after the Battle of Badr in March 624 that Safwan's opposition became active.

=== Battle of Badr ===
Safwan did not fight at Badr (March 624). When the news that the Quraysh army had been routed there first reached Mecca, Safwan said that the messenger was out of his mind. But when the messenger was asked, "What happened to Safwan ibn Umayya?" he replied: "There he is, sitting in the hijr, and I witnessed the killing of his father and his brother!"

In reaction to this, Safwan conspired with his cousin, Umayr ibn Wahb, to kill Muhammad. Safwan paid off Umayr's debts and took care of his family while Umayr went to Medina with his sword "sharpened and poisoned". Safwan promised the Quraysh that they would soon hear good news from Medina. But his plan backfired, for at the gate of the mosque, the Muslims recognized Umayr and brought him to Muhammad, who already knew the details of the plot. Umayr converted to Islam and returned to Mecca to preach and to "make difficulties for them in their religion as I used to make difficulties for your companions in theirs." Safwan swore that he would never speak to Umayr again. Umayr was violent towards those who opposed his preaching, "so that through him many became Muslims."

In November or December, Safwan took a merchant-caravan of silver vessels worth 100,000 dirhams towards Iraq. Zayd ibn Harithah led a raid on this caravan, and they seized all the silver, although the Quraysh men escaped.

=== Battle of Uhud ===
Safwan then conferred with Abdullah ibn Abi Rabia and Ikrimah ibn Abi Jahl. They "walked with the men whose fathers, sons and brothers had been killed at Badr, and they spoke to Abu Sufyan and those who had merchandise in that caravan, saying, 'Men of the Quraysh, Muhammad has wronged you and killed your best men, so help us with this money to fight him, so that we may hope to get our revenge for those we have lost.'" Safwan paid the poet Abu Azza to call up the Kinana tribes to rally to the Quraysh. The Quraysh "gathered together to fight the apostle" in March 625 in the event that became the Battle of Uhud.

Many of the Quraysh commanders brought women to cheer on the army: Safwan took his two wives, Barza bint Mas'ud and al-Baghum bint al-Muadhdhil. During the battle he struck the death-blow to the injured Kharija ibn Zayd (father-in-law of Abu Bakr) and mutilated his body because Kharija had attacked Safwan's father at Badr. He also killed Aws ibn Arqam and Ibn Qawqal.

In August 625 men from Adal and Al-Qara brought to Mecca three Muslims whom they had captured. Safwan bought one of them, Zayd ibn Al-Dathinna, so that he could kill him in revenge for the death of his father at Badr. He sent him to Tanim to be killed outside the sanctuary there. Abu Sufyan asked him, "Don't you wish, Zayd, that it was Muhammad who was in your place about to be killed and that you were at home with your family?" Zayd replied, "I would not wish so much as a thorn-prick on Muhammad, even if it would take me home to my family!" As Safwan's servant Nistas killed Zayd, Abu Sufyan remarked, "I never saw anyone as completely loved as Muhammad's companions love him."

=== Battle of the Trench ===
Safwan actively supported Abu Sufyan in planning and fund-raising for the Battle of the Trench.

In autumn 627 a merchant-caravan returning from Syria was carrying "much silver" belonging to Safwan. This caravan was intercepted at Al-'Is by Zayd ibn Haritha and 170 riders, who took the silver and several prisoners.

=== Treaty of Hudaybiyyah ===
When the Quraysh heard that 1600 Muslims were approaching Mecca in March 628, Safwan was one of the three leaders tasked with dealing with the situation. He sent Ikrima ibn Abi Jahl with 200 cavalry to muster support from surrounding tribes. When their allies arrived in Mecca, Safwan's house was one of the four hospitality points where the visitors could be fed, and when Uthman entered the city, Safwan was among those who greeted him. These events led to the Treaty of Hudaybiyyah.

Shortly afterwards, Muhammad ordered Muslim men to divorce any of their wives who were still pagans. One woman so divorced was Umar's wife, Umm Kulthum bint Jarwal. When she returned to Mecca, Safwan married her.

Meanwhile, Muhammad besieged Khaybar. The Quraysh elders took bets on who would win this battle: Safwan bet five camels that Muhammad would lose, and was angry when Abu Sufyan expressed scepticism. Afterwards Khalid ibn Al-Walid converted to Islam and invited Safwan to accompany him to Medina because, "We are the main fodder. Muhammad is victorious over the Arabs and non-Arabs." Safwan refused "with great aversion," saying, "Even if I were the only Qurashi alive, I would never follow him!" According to the terms of the treaty, Muhammad arrived in Mecca in March 629 for the minor pilgrimage. When Bilal called the Muslims to prayer from the Kaaba, Safwan exclaimed, "Praise God for letting my father die before he could see this!"

When the Bedouin chiefs, Farwa ibn Hubayra al-Qushayri and Nawfal ibn Muawiyah al-Dili, visited Mecca, they met with Safwan and other Quraysh elders. The Bedouin suggested that the Quraysh could unite with various Bedouin tribes and "attack [Muhammad] in the heart of his homeland." Since it would be impracticable to plot against Muhammad before they had first suppressed his Meccan allies, the Khuza'a, the Bedouin said they should attack the Khuza'a first. But Safwan and the others said they dared not breach the treaty, so they did not accept the plot.

In 629 the Dil clan of the Bakr tribe took revenge against the Khuza'a. Safwan and his slaves lent them weapons and assisted the attack. As the Bakr were allied to the Quraysh and the Khuza'a to the Muslims in Medina, this was a breach of the Treaty of Hudaybiyyah, and it triggered the Conquest of Mecca.

== Conversion to Islam ==
As the Muslim army surrounded Mecca in January 630, Safwan joined Ikrima ibn Abi Jahl in the final resistance to Muhammad at Al-Khandama. There they encountered Khalid ibn al-Walid, who routed them.

Safwan's wife Fakhita converted to Islam, but Safwan fled to Jeddah, intending to sail to Yemen. Before his ship departed, he was intercepted by Umayr ibn Wahb, who presented him with Muhammad's turban and said, "Safwan, do not destroy yourself! I have brought you a token of safe-conduct from Allah's Messenger." At first Safwan told him to go away, but Umayr persisted, saying, "Your cousin is the most excellent, righteous and forbearing of men. His strength is your strength, his honour is your honour, and his dominion is your dominion." Safwan replied that he was "in mortal fear" of Muhammad, but Umayr repeated that he was too generous and forbearing to think of killing him, and in the end Safwan agreed to return to Mecca with Umayr. Muhammad confirmed that he had indeed granted safe-conduct to Safwan. When Safwan asked for two months to consider his options, Muhammad replied that he might have four months.

A few weeks later, Safwan received a message from Muhammad, asking for the loan of his weapons and armour "that we may fight our enemy tomorrow." Safwan asked if Muhammad intended to force him to hand over the weapons; but on being told that it was only a friendly request and that his possessions would be returned, he replied that he had no objection. He arranged for the transport of a hundred coats of mail and other weapons for Muhammad's attack on the Hawazin at Hunayn. Safwan fought for Muhammad both at Hunayn, during which battle he remarked to his brother, "I would rather be ruled by a man from Quraysh than a man from Hawazin," and at the Siege of Ta'if.

Soon afterwards Safwan was among the "certain men of eminence" to whom Muhammad gave gifts "in order to conciliate them and win over their hearts." Safwan received a hundred camels. After Safwan's conversion, his wife Fakhita returned to live with him.

== Later life ==
It was said that Safwan "always remained a good Muslim," and he narrated traditions about Muhammad. One example occurred when he went to a party hosted by the family of Muhammad ibn Al-Fadl ibn Al-Abbas. When the food was served, he said, "Eat the meat with your front teeth, for I heard the Prophet say, 'Eat meat with your front teeth, for it is more appetizing, more wholesome and more enjoyable like that.'"

Safwan participated in Muslim conquest of Syria and served as a commander of a battalion during the Battle of Yarmouk. However did not he emigrate to Medina but remained in Mecca until his death in 661.

== See also ==
- Sahaba
- Rab'ah ibn Umayah
- Bilal ibn Ribah
- Abu Fakih
- Khubayb ibn Adiy
- List of expeditions of Muhammad
