= Abu Azzah Amr bin Abd Allah al-Jumahi =

Poetrist

Abu Azzah Amr bin Abd Allah al-Jumahi (Arabic: عمرو بن عبد الله بن عُمير بن وهب بن حذافة بن جمح) was an Arab Pagan at the time of the Islamic Prophet Muhammad who was involved in conflict with him. He had been treated kindly by Muhammad after the Battle of Badr, being a poor man with daughters, he had no means to pay ransom, he was released after Battle of Badr, on the condition that he would not take up arms against Muslims again. But he had broken his promise and participated in Battle of Uhud. He pleaded for mercy again, but Muhammad ordered him to be killed. Zubayr ibn al-Awwam executed him, and in another version, Asim ibn Thabit.

He was an influential poet who used his poetry to mobilize the masses against Muhammad. During the Battle of Uhud he used his poetry again to mobilise the masses against Muhammad. He also accompanied other Arab Pagans to the Battle of Uhud. He was captured again and stated "O Muhammad let me free, I was forced to come".

== See also ==
- List of battles of Muhammad
- Banu Jumah
