= Umayya ibn Khalaf =

Arab slave master and major opponent of the early Muslims (d. 624)

Umayya ibn Khalaf أمية ابن خلف
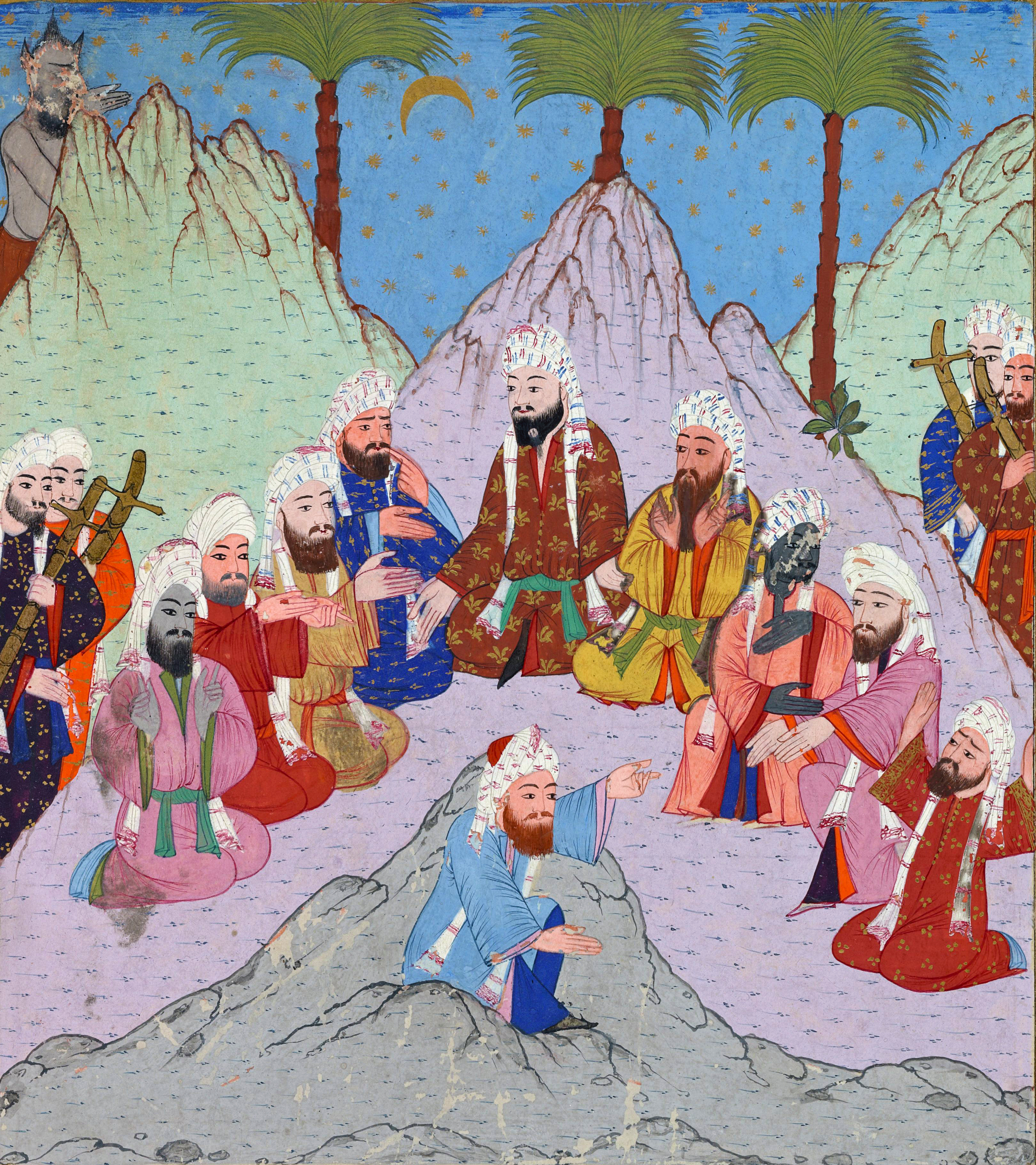
- Umayya and other Quraysh leaders discussing the second pledge at al-Aqabah being watched over by Iblis and spied on by Abu ʿĀmir al-Rāhib
- Born: Umayya ibn Khalaf ibn Wahb ibn Hudhafa ibn Jumah al-Jumahi; 563; Mecca, Hejaz, Arabia
- Died: March 13, 624 (aged 60–61); Badr, Hejaz, Arabia
- Cause of death: Killed at the Battle of Badr
- Known for: Opposition to Islam; Torturing the Muslim convert and companion of Muhammad, Bilal ibn Rabah
- Movement: Mushrikites
- Spouses: Karima bint Ma'mar; Layla bint Habib; Taw'ama bint Umayya
- Children: Safwan; Rabi'a
- Father: Khalaf ibn Wahb
- Family: Ubayy ibn Khalaf (brother); Banu Jumah

Umayya ibn Khalaf ibn Wahb ibn Hudhafa ibn Jumah al-Jumahi (Arabic: أمية ابن خلف, romanized: ʾUmayya ibn Khalaf) was an Arab slave master and the chieftain of the Banu Jumah of the Quraysh in the seventh century. He was one of the chief opponents against the Muslims led by the Islamic prophet Muhammad. Umayya is best known as the master of Bilal ibn Rabah, a slave he tortured for embracing Islam who eventually became the first mu'azzin.

== Family ==
Umayyah ibn Khalaf was the son of Khalaf ibn Wahb ibn Hudhafah ibn Jumah and he was a brother of Ubayy ibn Khalaf. He married three times:

- By his wife, Safiya bint Ma'mar ibn Habib, he had some sons: Safwan, Ahyah, and Salamah.
- By his wife, Karima bint Ma'mar ibn Habib, he had some sons: Walid (who was slain at Badr), Rabi'a, Muslim, Ma'bad and Mas'ud.
- By his wife, Layla bint Habib al-Tamimiyya from B. Tamim, he had a daughter, named al-Taw'ama bint Umayyah.

== Opposition to Islam ==
Umayyah was involved in the pagan religious ceremonies of Mecca, where he distributed perfume in the square of the Kaaba.

After Muhammad began to preach against idolatry, Umayyah became a staunch opponent of the new teaching. He used to slander Muhammad, and it is about him that the Surah Humaza refers: "Woe to the slanderer and backbiter". He subjected his slave Bilal ibn Rabah to torture for having adopted Islam. He forced Bilal to lie on hot desert sand and pinned him down with a heavy stone on his chest. When Bilal still refused to denounce Islam, a heavy person was to jump on the stone. Bilal kept repeating, "Ahad! Ahad!" (One (God)! One (God)!)

== Friendship with Abd al-Rahman ==
Ummayah had a very close and dear friend named Abdu Amr. Their friendship was strained when Abdu Amr converted to Islam and changed his name to Abd al-Rahman and later emigrated to Medina. Not only that, but to Ummayah's chagrin and dismay, Abdu Amr then gave his sister in marriage to Bilal ibn Rabah, Ummayah's former slave. All of these events caused pain and dismay, but in tribal societies at that time, ties of childhood friendship were extraordinarily strong and lasting. Ummayah retained affection and a sense of duty towards his old friend, which was reciprocated. Because of their friendship, the two friends formed a written agreement according to which Abdul Rahman was to protect Umayah's property and family in Medina, while Umayyah would protect Abd-al-Rahman's property and family in Mecca. While drafting the document, when Abd al-Rahman was referred to by his new (Islamic) name, Umayyah protested, saying "I do not know any Ar-Rahman" and requested that the pre-Islamic name, "Abdu Amr," be used. It is another measure of the reciprocity of affection between them that Abd al-Rahman yielded, and was referred to as "Abdu Amr" in the document.

== Friendship with Sa'd ==
Umayyah was also a good friend of Sa'd ibn Mua'dh. When Umayyah was in Medina on his way to Syria, he used to stay with Sa'd and when Sa'd was in Mecca, he used to stay with Umayah.

Prior to the Battle of Badr, Sa'd visited Mecca once to perform his Umrah. While he was with Umayyah, they came across Abu Jahl and had an argument. As the argument got heated, Sa'd threatened Abu Jahl with stopping the Meccan trade route to Syria. He then informed Umayyah that Umayyah's life was threatened by Muhammad.

== Battle of Badr ==
In the build-up to the battle of Badr, Umayyah received a visit from his childhood friend Sa'd, who had become a Muslim, emigrated to Medina, and was close to Muhammad. Sa'd had come to Mecca supposedly for Umrah ("minor" pilgrimage), but also to alert Umayyah; Sa'd told Umayyah in no uncertain terms that his life was in danger from the Muslims, including Muhammad, and that he should expect no mercy from either Muhammad or the Muslims in case he falls into their hands. The reason for this enmity and antipathy was Umayyah's former slave Bilal, who had by now become a favorite with Muhammad. When Bilal was a slave under Ummayah, he was heavily tortured prior to his emancipation by Abu Bakr.

In March 624, the Meccans decided to confront the Muslim forces that threatened a caravan from Syria led by Abu Sufyan ibn Harb. Abu Jahl rallied the people for war, saying, "Go and protect your caravan." Umayyah, who was anxious after having received Sa'd's warning, did not want to leave Mecca. However, Abu Jahl persisted: "O Abu Safwan! If the people see you staying behind, though you are the chief of the people of the Valley, then they will remain behind with you." Abu Jahl urged him until he said, "As you have forced me to change my mind, I will buy the best camel in Mecca." Umayyah told his wife: "O Umm Safwan, prepare what I need (for the journey)." She said to him, "O Abu Safwan! Have you forgotten what your Yathribi brother told you?" He said, "No, but I do not want to go with them except for a short distance." On the way to their engagement with the Muslims, Umayyah tied his camel wherever he camped and always remaining alert.

Although Abu Sufyan had informed the Meccan forces that the caravan was saved, the Meccan forces nonetheless proceeded to confront the Muslim forces. The battle commenced on 13 March 624 AD. The Meccan forces were routed by the Muslims and in the process, Umayyah was captured by his old friend Abdul Rahman ibn Awf, who went out of his way to look for and seize Umayyah in order to protect his life.

== Death ==
During the battle of Badr in 624, and despite his friend's best attempt at protecting him, Umayyah ibn Khalaf was swarmed and killed by the Ansar while fighting at the age of 61.

== See also ==
- List of expeditions of Muhammad
