= Asim ibn Thabit =

Sahabi (Companion) of Muhammad

Aasim ibn Thabit
- Born: Medina
- Died: 625
- Known for: Sahabi (Companion) of Muhammad; Muslim Military leader
- Parents: Thabit ibn Abi al-Aqlah (father); Al-Shamus bint Abi Amir (mother)
- Relatives: Asim ibn Umar (maternal nephew); Jamila bint Thabit (sister)
- Family: Banu Aws (tribe)

ʿAaṣim ibn Thābit (Arabic: عاصم بن ثابت) was one of the Ansar, a person belonging to one of the first generations of Muslims and who helped Muhammad after his migration to Medina.

== Military campaigns during Muhammad's era ==
He participated in the Battle of Badr. Muhammad's forces included Abu Bakr, Umar, Ali, Hamza, Mus`ab ibn `Umair, Az-Zubair bin Al-'Awwam, and Ammar ibn Yasir. The Muslims also brought seventy camels and two horses, meaning that they either had to walk or fit three to four men per camel. However, many early Muslim sources indicate that no serious fighting was expected, and the future Caliph Uthman stayed behind to care for his sick wife Ruqayyah, the daughter of Muhammad. Salman the Persian also could not join the battle, as he was still not a free man.

He also participated in the Invasion of Hamra al-Asad, After staying at Hamra al-Asad for three days, Muhammad returned to Medina. He captured Abu Azzah al-Jumahi as prisoner. Abu Azzah had previously been one of the prisoners of Badr. Abu Azzah Amr bin Abd Allah al-Jumahi had been treated kindly by Muhammad after the Battle of Badr, being a poor man with daughters, he had no means to pay ransom, he was released after Battle of Badr, on the condition that he would not take up arms against Muslims again. But he had broken his promise and participated in Battle of Uhud. He pleaded for mercy again, but Muhammad ordered him to be killed. Az-Zubair executed him, and in another version, Asim ibn Thabit.

The father of one of Umar's wives, Umm Kulthum bint Asim, was Asim ibn Thabit. It is not clear if that person is the same person as the subject of this article.

Asim ibn Thabit was killed during the Expedition of Al Raji. In 625 some men requested that Muhammad send instructors to teach them Islam, but the men were bribed by the two tribes of Khuzaymah who wanted revenge for the assassination of Khalid bin Sufyan by Muhammad's followers and they killed the Muslim's After killing Asim ibn Thabit, Hudhayl wanted to sell his head.

== Hadith ==
A hadith attributed to Abu Hurairah reports:

The Messenger of Allah, may Allah bless him and grant him peace, sent out ten men on a scouting expedition and put 'Asim ibn Thabit al-Ansari in command of them. They proceeded until they reached Had'a, which is between 'Usfan and Makka.

Their presence was reported to a branch of Hudhayl called the Banu Lihyan. About a hundred men, who were all archers, set out after them. They followed their tracks. When 'Asim and his companions perceived them, they took cover. The people surrounded them and said, 'Come down and give yourselves up! You have protection and assurance that we will not kill any of you!'

Asim ibn Thabit said, 'O people! As for me, I will not come down into the protection of an unbeliever! O Allah, inform Your Prophet about us!' They shot at them with arrows and killed 'Asim. A group of three came down, accepting the offer of protection and security. They included Khubayb al-Ansari, Zayd ibn Dathina, and another man.

…

The Prophet, may Allah bless him and grant him peace, informed his Companions about them on the day they fell. When they were informed that Asim ibn Thabit had been killed, some of the unbelievers of Quraysh were sent to bring part of him that could be recognised. He had killed one of their great men on the Day of Badr. Allah sent over 'Asim a swarm of bees like a cloud and it protected him from their messengers and they could not cut off any part of him."

== See also ==
- Asem, an Arabic name for males
- Thabit, an Arabic name for males
- List of battles of Muhammad
- List of Sahabah
