= Banu Lahyan =

Banu Lahyan (Arabic: بنو لحيان) were an Arab pagan tribe during the time of Muhammad and were involved in several military conflicts with him. The first was in 625 during the Expedition of Abdullah Ibn Unais, where Muhammad sent Abdullah ibn Unais to kill Khaled bin Sufyan Al-Hathali, who was the chief of the tribe. Muhammad alleged that he was planning to attack Madinah and incite the people of Nakhla and Uranah to attack him. Therefore, he sent Abdullah ibn Unais to assassinate him in 625 during the Expedition of Abdullah Ibn Unais. This was followed by the Invasion of Banu Lahyan in September 627 when Muhammad ordered his followers to attack the Banu Lahyan tribe to get revenge for the killing of 10 Muslims in the Expedition of Al Raji

== See also ==
- List of expeditions of Muhammad
