= Expedition of Al Raji =

635 CE Muslim mission

Expedition of al Raji
Date	625, 4th Hijri, after Battle of Uhud
Location	al-Raji
Result	Banu Lahyan Victory: Muhammad sends missionaries to preach Islam; Missionaries were set up and killed

Belligerents
Muslims	Banu Lahyan tribe Banu Hudhayl tribe

Strength
10	Unknown

Casualties and losses
10	0

The Expedition of al Raji occurred directly after the Battle of Uhud in the year AH 4 of the Islamic calendar.

== Background ==
Immediately after the Uhud battle, a group of men from Adal and al-Qarah came to Muhammad; requested him to send with them a few instructors to teach Islam to their people who had embraced Islam. Muhammad agreed to this, and promptly sent six men (or ten men as per Ibn Sa’d) with them. However, those emissaries were sent by the Banu Lahyan, who wanted to avenge the killing of their chief, Khalid bin Sufyan al-Hadhali in the Expedition of Abdullah Ibn Unais. Among the six missionaries selected by Muhammad was Asim bin Thabit, who was appointed the head of this delegation.

In a differing account in Sahih al-Bukhari, ten men were sent in all, and they were sent as spies, "to bring the enemy's secrets."

== Attack on Muslims ==
When the Muslim party arrived at al-Raji, the delegation took rest for the night. Then a completely surprising attack with swords was initiated on the six Muslims to extract money from them. They promised not to kill them, but to derive money as ransom.

However, the Muslims refused to believe the promise of the polytheists and fought back. All the Muslims, except Zayd bin al-Dathinnah, Khubyab bin Adi and Abd Allah bin Tariq were killed. These three Muslims surrendered and were taken as prisoners to be sold in Mecca. Zayd bin al-Dathinah was sold to Safwan ibn Umayya, Abu Sufyan wanted to spare his life in exchange for the life of Muhammad. But Zayd's love for Muhammad was so great that he did not want Muhammad to be hurt even by a "thorn prick". The Quraysh killed all three Muslims.

According to the Muslim scholar Safiur Rahman Mubarakpuri, the Quraysh ordered Khubayb bin Adi to be crucified by Uqba bin al-Harith because he had killed Uqba bin al-Harith's father. He also mentions Zayd bin al-Dathinnah was purchased by Safwan ibn Umayya, and he killed Zayd bin al-Dathinnah because he killed his father on the battlefield.

After killing Asim ibn Thabit, Hudhayl wanted to sell his head.

It was then that Khubaib (one prisoner) first set the tradition of praying in prostration before being executed. According to Ar-Raheeq Al-Makhtum (The Sealed Nectar), he then said:

"O Lord! Count them one by one, exterminate them to the last one."

== Motives for attacking Muslims ==
According to William Montgomery Watt, the most common version of the event states that the motives of the Banu Lahyan for attacking Muslims, was that the Banu Lahyan wanted to get revenge for the assassination of their chief at Muhammad's instigation. So they bribed the two tribes of Khuzaymah to say they wanted to convert to Islam. Watt also said that the seven men Muhammad sent may have been spies for Muhammad and instructors for Arab tribes. He also said that it is difficult to verify the exact date the assassination of their chief took place.

Watt's claim that they were spies and not missionaries is mentioned in the Sunni hadith collection Sahih al-Bukhari as follows:

The Prophet sent a Sariya of missionaries and appointed 'Asim bin Thabit, the grandfather of 'Asim bin 'Umar bin Al-Khattab, as their leader. So they set out, and when they reached (a place) between 'Usfan and Mecca, they were mentioned to one of the branch tribes of Bani Hudhail called Lihyan. So, about one-hundred archers followed their traces till they (i.e. the archers) came to a journey station where they (i.e. 'Asim and his companions) had encamped and found stones of dates they had brought as journey food from Medina. Sahih al-Bukhari, 5:59:412

=== Missionaries not spies ===
Although Sahih al-Bukhari, 5:59:412 mentions that the Muslims were actually spies and not missionaries, the Muslim scholar Safiur Rahman Mubarakpuri described the Muslims as people who will go to "instruct them in religion" and quoted part of Sahih al-Bukhari, 5:59:412 but failed to mention that they were spies. The 7th century Muslim scholar al-Waqidi also mentioned that they were spies but a tribe did come to them requesting to teach Islam but Muhammad decided to send them for spying to inform him about the Quraysh.

== Islamic Sources ==
=== Biographical literature ===
This event is mentioned by Muslim historians Tabari, Ibn Hisham. The Muslim jurist Ibn Qayyim Al-Jawziyya also mentions the event in his biography of Muhammad, Zad al-Ma'ad. and Ibn Sa’d also mentions the event in his book about Muhammad's battles. Modern secondary sources which mention this, include the award-winning book, Ar-Raheeq Al-Makhtum (The Sealed Nectar).

=== Hadith literature ===
The event is mentioned in the Sahih Muslim hadith collection as follows:

Anas reported that the Messenger of Allah (may peace be upon him) observed Qunut for one month invoking curse upon some tribes of Arabia (those who were responsible for the murders in Bi'r Ma'una and Raji'), but then abandoned it Sahih Muslim, 4:1442

According to Ar-Raheeq Al-Makhtum (The Sealed Nectar), the event is also mentioned in the Sahih al-Bukhari hadith collection. The killing of Khubyab bin Adi by Uqba bin al-Harith is mentioned in Sahih al-Bukhari as follows:

The person who killed Khubaib was Abu Sarua (i.e. 'Uqba bin Al-Harith). Sahih al-Bukhari, 5:59:413

== See also ==
- Military career of Muhammad
- List of expeditions of Muhammad
- Muslim–Quraysh War

== Notes ==
- Mubarakpuri, Saifur Rahman Al (2005), The sealed nectar: biography of the Noble Prophet, Darussalam Publications, ISBN 978-9960-899-55-8
- Mubarakpuri, Safiur Rahman Al (2005), The Sealed Nectar (Free Version), Darussalam Publications, ISBN 9798694145923. Note: This is the free version available on Google Books
