= Expedition of Abdullah Ibn Unais =

Expedition of Abdullah ibn Unais (Sirya of Muhammad)
Date	Muharram, A.H. 3 (624 CE)
Location	Nejd
Result	Abdullah ibn Unais beheads the Banu Lahyan chief, and brings his head back to Muhammad

Belligerents
Muslims	Banu Lahyan

Commanders and leaders
Abdullah ibn Unais	Khalid ibn Sufyan al-Hudhali

Strength
Unknown	Unknown

Casualties and losses
0	Chief of Banu Lahyan Killed

The Expedition of Abdullah ibn Unais, also known as the Assassination of Khaled bin Sufyan, was the first attack against the Banu Lahyan, which took place in the month of Muharram in the year A.H. 3. It was reported that Khalid ibn Sufyan al-Hudhali (also known as Hudayr, the chief of the Banu Lahyan tribe), considered an attack on Madinah and that he was inciting the people on Nakhla or Uranah to fight Muslims. So Muhammad sent Abdullah ibn Unais to assassinate him. After cutting off Khaled bin Sufyan's head at night, Unais brought it back to Muhammad.

== Attack on the chief of Banu Lahyan ==
After the migration to Medina Muhammed tried to gather information of possible attacks and acted to crush his enemies. This expedition was executed on a similar news. Abdullah ibn Unais found Khaled bin Sufyan Al-Hathali (also known as Hudayr, the chief of the Banu Lahyan tribe) in the company of his wife. Khaled bin Sufyan trusted him. Then Unais asked to talk to him privately, once, while conversing, Abdullah ibn Unais walked a short distance with ibn Sufyan, and when an opportunity came he struck him with his sword and killed him. After killing ibn Sufyan, he cut off his head and brought that to Muhammad. Muhammad gave him his staff as a reward and said:

This will function as a sign of recognition for you and me, on the day of resurrection (Musnad Ahmad 3:496)

Another branch of Banu Lihyan planned to take revenge for the killing of their leader, Khaled bin Sufyan.

== Islamic sources ==
=== Biographical literature ===
This event is mentioned in Ibn Hisham's biography of Muhammad. The Muslim jurist Ibn Qayyim Al-Jawziyya also mentions the event in his biography of Muhammad, Zad al-Ma'ad. Modern secondary sources which mention this, include the award winning book, Ar-Raheeq Al-Makhtum (The Sealed Nectar).

The Muslim jurist Tabari, also mentions the event in his biography of Muhammad:

"The Messenger of God called me and said, 'It has reached me that Khalid b. Sufyan b. Nubayh al-Hudhali is gathering a force to attack me. He is either in Nakhlah or 'Uranah, so go to him and kill him.'" Al-Tabari vol.9 p.121

=== Hadith literature ===
The incident is also mentioned in the Sunni Hadith collection Sunan Abu Dawud:

The Apostle of Allah (pbuh) send me to Khalid b. Sufyan al-Hudhali. This was towards 'Uranah and 'Arafat. He (the Prophet) said: Go and kill him. I saw him when the time of the afternoon prayer had come. I said: I am afraid if a fight takes place between me and him (Khalid b. Sufyan), that might delay the prayer. I proceeded walking towards him while I was praying making a sign. When I reached near him, he said to me: Who are you? I replied: A man from the Arabs; it came to me that you were gathering (an army) for this man (i.e. the Prophet). Hence I came to you in connection with this matter. He said: I am (engaged) in this (work). I then walked along with him for a while.; when it became convenient for me, I dominated him with my sword until he became cold (dead).
[Abu Dawud, book 2 no.1244]

The event is also mentioned in Musnad Ahmad 3:496.

== See also ==
- List of expeditions of Muhammad
- Military career of Muhammad
- Muslim–Quraysh War

== Notes ==
- Mubarakpuri, Saifur Rahman Al (2005), The sealed nectar: biography of the Noble Prophet, Darussalam Publications, ISBN 978-9960-899-55-8
