= Assault on Banu Bakra =

This is a sub-article to Muhammad in Medina

Assault on Banu Bakra was a military operation on Sha'aban 8 AH that ended the Treaty of Hudaybiyyah, resulting shortly in the Conquest of Mecca
