= Bay'ah =

Islamic oath of office

Bayʿah (Arabic: بَيْعَة, "Pledge of allegiance"), in Islamic terminology, is an oath of allegiance to a leader. It is known to have been practiced by the Islamic prophet Muhammad. In Bedouin culture it was a procedure for choosing the leader of the tribe, and is sometimes taken under a written pact given on behalf of the subjects by leading members of the tribe with the understanding that as long as the leader abides by certain requirements towards his people, they are to maintain their allegiance to him. Bayʿah is still practiced in countries such as Saudi Arabia and Sudan. In Morocco, bayʿah is one of the foundations of the monarchy.

== Etymology and definitions ==
Bay'ah derives from the Semitic triconsonantal root B-Y-’, related to commerce, and shows the contractual nature of the bond between caliph and the people. Bay'ah originally referred to the striking together of hands between buyer and seller to mark an agreement. According to Bernard Lewis, bay'ah originally referred not to an oath of allegiance but to an agreement between two parties, and in the language of government a contractual agreement between ruler and ruled. In time, however, when an agreement was reached, an oath of allegiance by the ruled came "to be a normal part of the proceedings".

=== Definitions ===
Muslim historian Ibn Khaldun described Bay'ah as

a pledge by the subject to obey the ruler and entrust him entirely with the conduct of his personal affairs and the affairs of the Moslem community without reservations. If the ruler applies the Law the subject has to execute his orders whether he agrees with them or not. The act of allegiance is accomplished by the subject placing his hands between the hands of the ruler.

Abu Hasan al-Mawardi (947-1058) maintained a bay'ah was a mandate "limited in time and authority" that could be revoked by those who pledged if the ruler abused his mandate.

According to Dr. Monir Ajalin, a bayah is more an acquiescence, and different from a mandate or an election. It is

the pledge by the people means that they show and display their acceptance of, and obedience to the new ruler. In no way is it, as some claim, a sort of election or a mandate to govern. It is an acceptance of what has already been done, a compliance with an accomplished fact a fait accompli represented by the seizure of power by the new ruler.

== In Islamic history ==
The tradition of bayʿah can be traced back to the era of Muhammad. From the beginning, bayʿah was taken by Muhammad as an oath of allegiance. Anybody who wanted to join the growing Islamic community did so by reciting the basic creed expressing faith in the oneness of God and the prophethood of Muhammad. However, this differed from the proclamation of faith necessary to become an individual Muslim. In addition to this, Muhammad formally took bayʿah from the people and tribes. Through this formal act, they were absorbed by the community and showed willingness to obey Muhammad. The text of the oath varies in different traditions, but often contains the Shahada and prayers of repentance.

It is reported that at annual gatherings outside Mecca, Muhammad met people from Yathrib (later renamed Medina), who accepted his call towards Islam. Muhammad then took bayʿah from them.

In Sunni Islam, the Bayʿah rite continued to be used throughout history to mark a caliph's accession, first in the Rashidun Caliphate (the Bayʿah of Abu Bakr occasioning the Shi'a-Sunni split), then throughout the Dynastic Caliphates (Umayyad, Abbasid and Ottoman). With the abolition of the Caliphate, Bayʿah remains in use today by some modern Muslim kingdoms such as Saudi Arabia and Morocco.

== In the Qur'an ==
Bayʿah Ceremony of the Commanders of Islamic Revolution Committees with Ali Khamenei, 8 June 1989

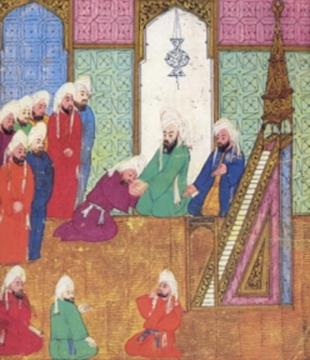
Bay'ah to Abu Bakr as the first Muslim caliph after 632 CE

After the Pledge of the Tree, which led to the Treaty of Hudaybiyyah, the following was revealed in the Qur'an commemorating and appreciating the pledge and those who made it:

Certainly Allah was well pleased with the believers when they swore allegiance to you under the tree, and He knew what was in their hearts, so He sent down tranquillity on them and rewarded them with a near victory,

— Sura Al-Fath, Ayah 18, Quran 48:18 ^{(Translated by Shakir)}

=== History ===
The bayʿah of Ridwan, a mass initiation of thousands of Muslims at the hands of Muhammad, is mentioned in the Qur'an. The tradition was continued by the caliphs.

In subsequent ages, it was associated with Sufi orders, and spiritual masters would initiate their followers. The practice still exists in Sufi orders around the world.

== See also ==
- Bay'ah (Ahmadiyya)
- Bay'ah Mosque

== Bibliography ==
- Chamieh, Jebran (1977). Traditionalists, Militants and Liberal in Present Islam. Research and Publishing House.
