= Al-Watir Raid =

- Part of Muslim-Quraysh War
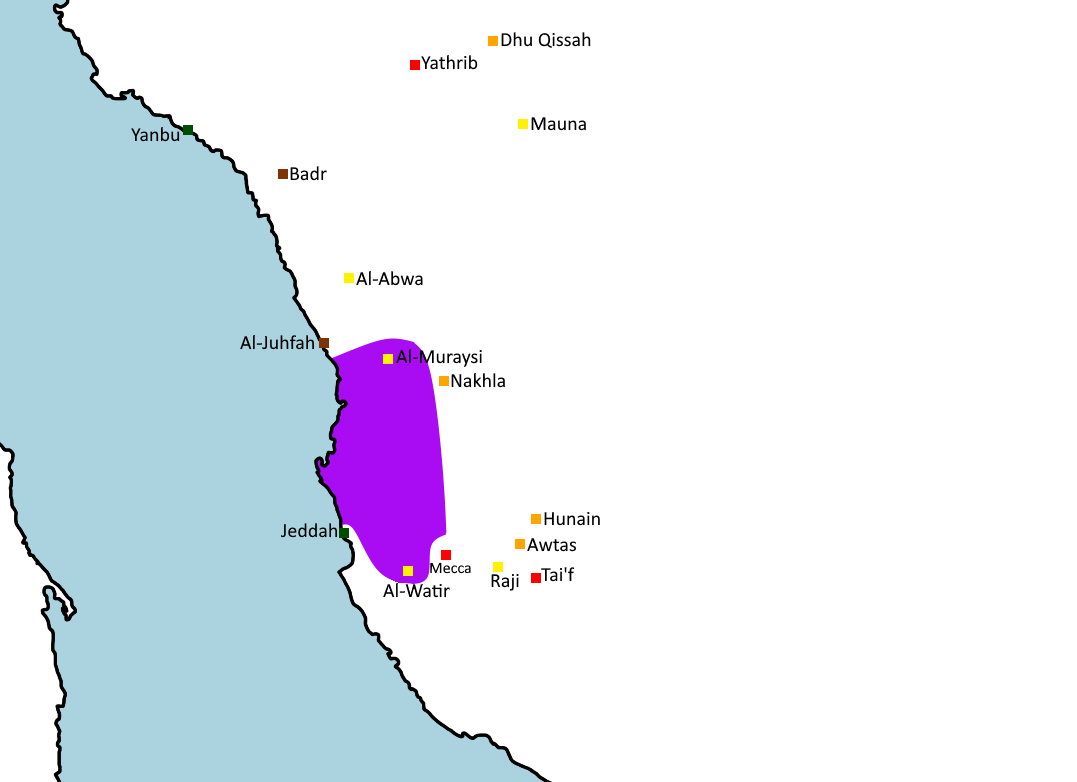
- Map of the Khuzaa tribe (in purple), including the al-Watir well (Southwest of Mecca)
Date	ca. December 629 CE (Sha'ban 8 AH)
Location	Al-Watir well, Khuzaa territory, Hejaz (Near modern–day Qudayd, Saudi Arabia)
Result	Banu Bakr victory: Breach of the Treaty of Hudaybiyyah; Eventual Conquest of Mecca by Muhammad

Belligerents
First Islamic state; Banu Khuza'ah	Banu Bakr; Quraysh

Commanders and leaders
Unknown	Nawfal ibn Muawiya al-Di'li; Ikrima ibn Amr; Safwan ibn Umayya; Suhayl ibn Amr

Casualties and losses
23 KIA (Mostly women, children and the elderly)	Unknown

The Al-Watir Raid (Arabic: الوتير) was a night ambush launched by the Banu Bakr ibn Abd Manat tribe. (Note: The Banu Bakr ibn Abd Manat are a subtribe of the Banu Abd Manat tribe, who are a subtribe of the Kinana, who are also the mother tribe of the Quraysh.) The attack was targeted against the Banu Ka'b ibn Amr, a sub tribe of the Khuzaa. This eventually led to the annulment of the Treaty of Hudaybiyyah, which subsequently led to the Conquest of Mecca by the Islamic prophet Muhammad a few months later.

== Background ==
=== Pre-Islamic conflict ===
Even before the rise of Islam, the Khuzaa and Banu Bakr tribes were engaged in ongoing conflict. The dispute began when a merchant from the Banu al-Hadrami tribe, Malik ibn ‘Ubad — an ally of the Banu Bakr — was killed by members of the Khuzaa, who then took his belongings. In response, the Banu Bakr killed a man from the Khuzaa, sparking a cycle of retaliation between the two tribes.

Shortly before the rise of Islam, the Khuza‘a launched a raid against the Banu Di'l, a branch of the Banu Bakr, in which they killed the children of al-Aswad ibn Ruzn al-Di‘li, who were among the prominent chiefs of the Kinana: Salma, Kulthum, and Dhu‘ayb. The conflict remained unresolved, even after the Treaty of al-Hudaybiya.

=== Treaty of Hudaybiya ===
After the Treaty of Hudaybiyyah was signed between the First Islamic state, led by Prophet Muhammad, and the Quraysh, represented by Suhayl ibn Amr, it was agreed that any tribe could choose to ally with either side. The Khuzaa joined the Muslims, while the Banu Bakr allied with the Quraysh. The treaty also established a ten-year ceasefire between the Muslims and the Quraysh, which temporarily brought an end to the conflict between the Khuza‘a and the Banu Bakr.

== Raid ==
Two years after the treaty, around 630 CE (8 AH), the chief of the Banu Bakr, Nawfal ibn Muʿawiya al-Diʿli, seeking revenge for the deaths of the Banu Bakr chiefs, gathered a force from his tribe and launched a surprise night attack on the Banu Kaʿb ibn Amr, a branch of the Khuzaʿa, at the al-Watir well. The Quraysh supported them with weapons and supplies, and even sent forces led by Ikrima ibn Amr, Safwan ibn Umayya, and Suhayl ibn Amr to aid in the assault.

As the raiders approached the well, they encountered an elderly and ill man named Munabbih and a tribesman Taym ibn Asad. Seeing the attackers advancing, Munabbih said to Taym:
“O Taym, save yourself. As for me, by God, whether they kill me or leave me, I am a dead man — my heart has already failed.” Soon after, Munabbih was killed, while Taym managed to escape.

After the killing of Munabbih, a large fight broke out, which resulted in the Khuzaa fleeing toward Mecca, pursued by the Banu Bakr. As they ran, the Khuzaʿa cried out: “We have entered the Haram — fear God!”
But Nawfal replied: “Today, there is no God for you! O Banu Bakr, take your revenge! You steal in the Haram, so why not take your revenge in it too?”

In Mecca, some of the Khuzaa found refuge in the house of Budayl ibn Warqaʿ al-Khuzaʿi, as well as in the house of their freedman Rafiʿ.

== Aftermath ==
Up to 23 people were killed during the raid, mostly women, children and the elderly.

=== Khuzaa's call for help and response in Medina ===
Upon hearing the news of the raid, Amr ibn Salim al-Khuzai, the chief of the Khuzaa, hurried from Mecca to Medinah to deliver the news to the prophet Muhammad. Entering the Prophet's Mosque, he saw Muhammad sitting with his companions, and addressed him with a poem:

"O Lord, I appeal to Muhammad,
By the covenant of our fathers, the ancient and steadfast,
You were a child among us, and we were your parents,
Then we embraced Islam and never withdrew our hand,
So grant, O Messenger of Allah, a mighty victory,
And call upon the servants of Allah to come as support,
Among them is the Messenger of Allah, prepared for battle,
White (pure) like the full moon, ascending high,
If he is threatened with humiliation, his face will change,
In an army like the sea, surging with waves,
Indeed, Quraysh have broken their promise to you,
And violated your confirmed treaty,
And set an ambush for me at Kadaa,
And claimed that I would not call upon anyone,
But they are more abased and fewer in number,
They attacked us at al-Wateer by night,
And killed us while we were bowing and prostrating."

Muhammad is said to have replied: "You are granted help, O Amr bin Salim". Then as a cloud appeared in the sky he said, "This cloud will provide help for the Banu Ka'b."

Soon after, Budayl, the Khuzaa that housed many of the fleeing Khuzaa also travelled to Medina to ask for help. Having done so, he made his way back to Mecca, but on his way, he met Abu Sufyan, who travelled to Medina to negotiate with Muhammad. Abu Sufyan accused him of secretly talking to Muhammad, but Budayl denied it and managed to get away.

=== Failed negotiations and Conquest of Mecca ===
Abu Sufyan attempts at negotiations as Muhammad and many of the companions ignored him. He returned to Mecca while Muhammad secretly began preparations for an invasion. A month later, in the month of Ramadan, Muhammad, with an army of 10,000 men, launched an invasion of Mecca and occupied the city without major resistance, thus ending the 8 year long conflict between the Muslims and the Quraysh.

== Sources ==
=== Bibliography ===
- Muhammad Sulayman al-Tayib (2020). موسوعة القبائل العربية [Encyclopedia of Arab tribes] (in Arabic). Vol. 9. دار الفكر العربي. pp. 741–746.
- Ibn Ishaq (1967). سيرة رسول الله [The Life of Muhammad]. Karachi: Oxford University Press. pp. 540–541.
- Ahmad Ahmad al-Ghulush (2004). السيرة النبوية والدعوة في العهد المدني [The Prophet’s Biography and Call during the Medinan Era] (in Arabic). مؤسسة الرسالة للطباعة والنشر والتوزيع. pp. 571–572.
- Akram, A.I. (2007). Sword of Allah: Khalid ibn al-Waleed. Birmingham: Maktabah publishers and distributors. p. 80.
- Muhammad Abu Shabah (1992). السيرة النبوية على ضوء القرآن والسنة [The Biography of the Prophet in the Light of the Qur’an and Sunnah] (in Arabic). Vol. 2. Damascus, Beirut: دار القلم. pp. 435–436.
