= Al-Mumtahanah =

60th chapter of the Qur'an

Surah 60 of the Quran
الممتحنة Al-Mumtaḥanah She That is to be Examined
- Qira'ah; English text
- Classification: Medinan
- Other names: Al-Imtihan ("The Examining"), Al-Mawaddah ("The Affection")
- Position: Juzʼ 28
- No. of verses: 13
- No. of Rukus: 2

Al-Mumtahanah
Recitation of Al-Mumtahanah in mujawwad.

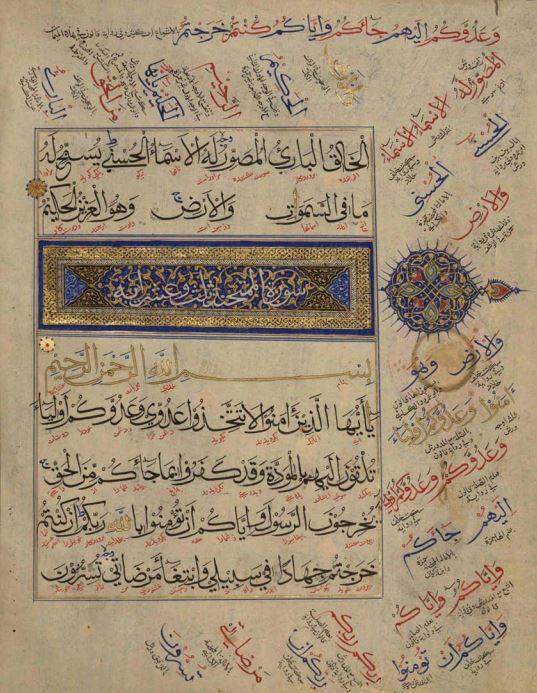
The beginning of Surat Al-Mumtahanah, in a 15th-century Qur'anic manuscript from Northern India.

Al-Mumtaḥanah (Arabic: الممتحنة, translated "She That Is To Be Examined", "Examining Her") is the 60th chapter (sura) of the Quran, a Medinan sura with 13 verses.

== Summary ==
The first verse warns Muslims not to make alliance with the enemies of God. Verses 4–6 provide Abraham as a model for this, as he distanced himself from the pagans of his own tribe, including his own father. Verses 7 to 9 declare the possibility that Muslims and their erstwhile enemy might have better relations ("It may be that God will forge affection between you and those of them with whom you are in enmity") if the former enemy stops fighting the Muslims. These verses provide basis for the relations of Muslims and non-Muslims according to the Quran: the basic relation is peace unless the Muslims are attacked, or when war is justified to stop injustice or protect the religion.

The next following verses (10–12) address some matters of Islamic law. They declare marriages between Muslims and polytheists to be no longer valid, and instruct Muslims on how to resolve the question of mahr when dissolving such marriages. The status of inter-religious marriages was very relevant at the time of the revelation of these verses, a time when multiple women from Mecca converted to Islam while their husbands did not, or vice versa.

== Verses ==
- 1-3 Muslims forbidden to make friends with the enemies of God
- 4-6 This precept enforced by the example of Abraham
- 7 Enemies of God may become friends of Muslims by conversion
- 8-9 Distinction between enemies and mere unbelievers
- 10 Female refugees, being true believers, are to be regarded as divorced from their heathen husbands
- 11 How to recover dowers of Muslim women who apostatise
- 12 The confession of faith required of converts from Arab idolatry
- 13 True believers not to make friends with infidels

== Revelation history ==
According to the Islamic tradition, Al-Mumtahanah is a Medinan sura, that is a chapter that is revealed after Muhammad's hijra to Medina. According to The Study Quran, the revelation likely took place at some point after the 6th year after the hijra (AH) or 628 CE. According to some commentators, the first verse was revealed during the conquest of Mecca in 8 AH (January 630 CE). Various of scholars of Islam, included Ibn Taymiyyah and Muhammad Sulaiman Al-Ashqar, tafsir expert from Islamic University of Madinah, has issued fatwa based on Hadith Qudse from Hatib ibn Abi Balta'ah and the revelation of first verse of Al-Mumtahanah, that every Companions of the Prophet who attended of battle of Badr has been elevated to the saints status by Allah Himself.

The traditional Egyptian chronology puts the chapter as the 91st chapter by the order of revelation (after Al-Tur), while the Nöldeke Chronology (by the orientalist Theodor Nöldeke) puts it as the 110th.

== Name ==
Quranic commentators Mahmud al-Alusi (d. 1854) and Abu 'Abdullah Al-Qurtubi (d. 1273) mentioned that this refers to Umm Kulthum bint Uqbah who was the subject of several of its verses. The chapter is also called al-Imtihan ("The Examining"): according to Al-Qurtubi, this is because the chapter examines the fault of mankind. It is also called al-Mawaddah ("The Affection"), because the first verse includes the phrase "you offer them affection", and the seventh includes "God will forge affection", and because affection of the Muslims is one of the themes in the chapter. In the 1730s, George Sale opines in his translation footnotes "this chapter bears this title because it directs the women who desert and come over from the infidels to the Moslems to be examined, and tried whether they be sincere in their profession of the faith."

== Bibliography ==
- Ernst, Carl W. (5 December 2011). How to Read the Qur'an: A New Guide, with Select Translations. Univ of North Carolina Press. ISBN 978-0-8078-6907-9.
- Nasr, Seyyed Hossein; Dagli, Caner K.; Dakake, Maria Massi; Lumbard, Joseph E.B. (2015). The Study Quran: A New Translation and Commentary. New York, NY: HarperCollins. ISBN 978-0-06-112586-7.
- Abdul Kader, A. H. (1969). "Islamic Involvement in the Process of History". In Edward J. Jurji (ed.). Religious Pluralism and World Community. Leiden, The Netherlands: E. J. Brill. pp. 93–112.
