= First Islamic state =

State established in Medina in 622

- 622–632
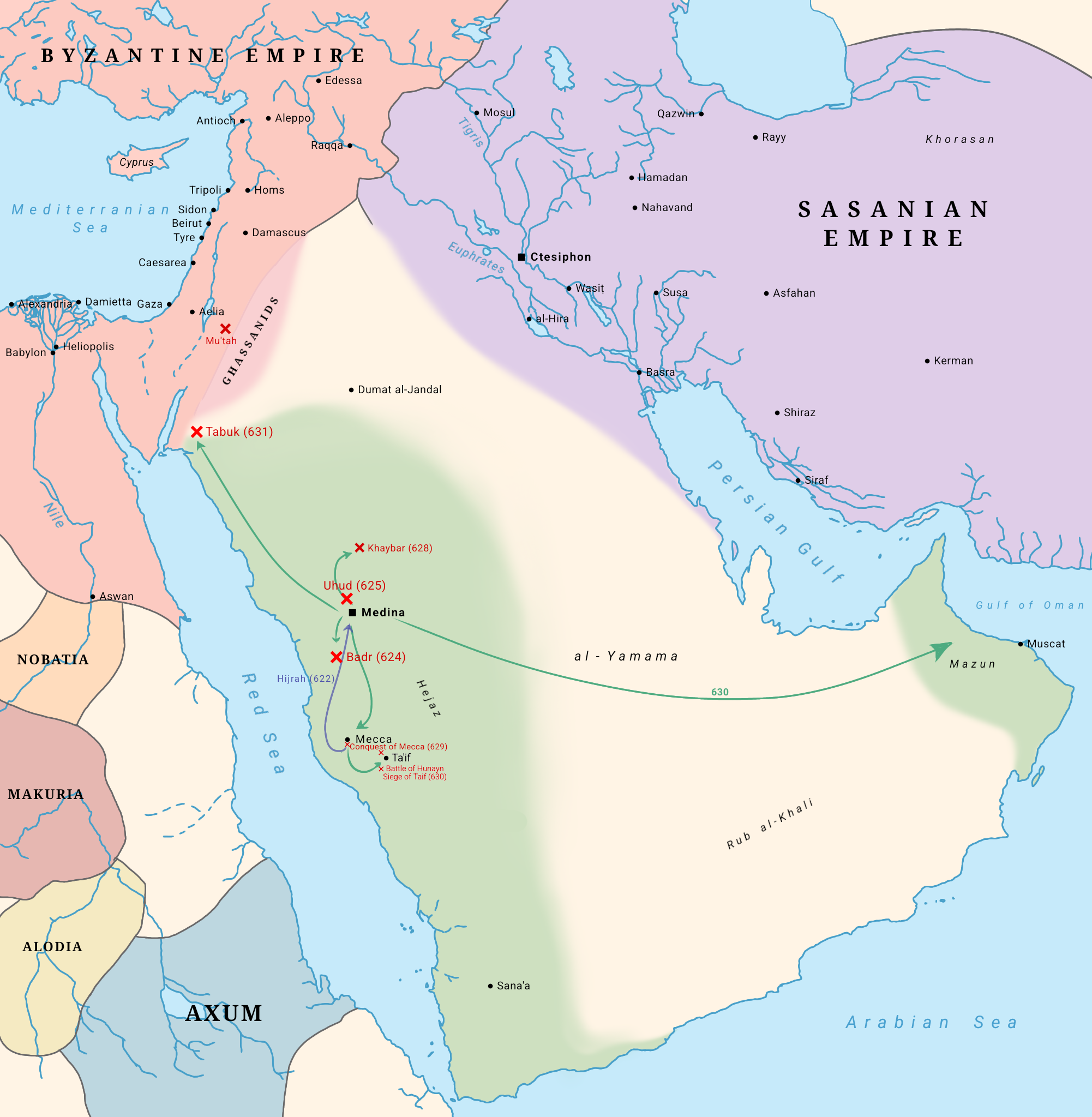
- The state of Medina (green) at the time of Muhammad's death, c. 632. It also shows the routes of early Muslim expeditions and conquests under Muhammad.
- Capital: Medina
- Largest city: Mecca
- Common languages: Classical Arabic
- Ethnic groups: Arabs, Habesha peoples, Jews, Persians, Byzantines
- Religion: Islam (state)
- Government: Islamic state
- Leader
  - 622–632: Muhammad
- Historical era: Late antiquity
  - Muhammad's migration to Medina: 622
  - Constitution of Medina: 622
  - Battle of Badr: 13 March 624
  - Battle of Uhud: 23 March 625
  - Battle of the Trench: 31 March – 14 April 627
  - Treaty of al-Hudaybiya: March 628
  - Conquest of Mecca: 31 December 629 – 10 January 630
  - Succession to Muhammad: 632
- Currency: Denarius; Dirham
Preceded by
Pre-Islamic Arabia
Sasanian Yemen
Mazun (historical region)
Muhammad in Mecca
Succeeded by
Rashidun Caliphate

The first Islamic state was established by the Islamic prophet Muhammad in the city of Medina in 622 CE/1 AH under the Constitution of Medina. It represented the political unity of the Muslim Ummah (nation). After Muhammad's death, his companions known as the Rightly Guided Caliphs (the Rashidun) founded the Rashidun Caliphate (632–661) which began massive expansion and motivated subsequent Islamic states, such as the Umayyad Caliphate (661–750) and Abbasid Caliphate (750–1258).

According to the traditional sirah account, Muhammad was born in Mecca—an important caravan trading center—around the year 570 CE/52 BH to a family belonging to the clan of Quraysh, which was the chief tribe of Mecca and a dominant force in Hejaz region. When he was about 40 years old, he began receiving at mount Hira' what Muslims regard as divine revelations delivered through the Archangel Gabriel, which would later form the Qur'an. These inspirations urged him to proclaim a strict monotheistic faith, as the final expression of Biblical prophetism earlier codified in the sacred texts of Judaism and Christianity; to warn his compatriots of the impending Judgement Day; and to castigate social injustices of his city. Muhammad's message won over a handful of followers and was met with increasing resistance from Meccan notables. He had been invited to Medina by city leaders to adjudicate disputes between clans from which the city suffered. Muhammad came to the city of Medina following the migration of his followers in what is known as the Hijrah in 622 and received positively by the city's Jewish and pagan residents as an arbitrator. As a result, he was accepted by popular consensus as the city's political leader, establishing the first Islamic state with his role.

The first Islamic state was governed largely by the Constitution of Medina—in modern terminology—which dictated Muhammad's unification of Medina's tribes and the muhajirun (Muhammad's followers).

== Historicity ==
Prophetic biography, known as sīra, along with attributed records of the words, actions, and the silent approval of Muhammad, known as hadith, survive in the historical works of writers from the second and third centuries of the Muslim era (c. 700−1000 CE), and give a great deal of information on Muhammad.

The general Islamic view is that the Quran has been preserved from the beginning by both writing and memorization, and its testimony is considered beyond doubt. The earliest Muslim source of information for the life of Muhammad, the Quran, gives very little personal information and its historicity is debated. A group of researchers explores the irregularities and repetitions in the Quranic text in a way that refutes the traditional claim that it was preserved by memorization alongside writing. According to them, an oral period shaped the Quran as a text and order, and the repetitions and irregularities mentioned were remnants of this period.

Historicity can be based on sealed documents, orders, treaty texts, archaeological findings and internal and external correspondence of neighboring states or communities, as well as the discovery of Muhammad's genetic makeup and kinship through his personal belongings and physical remains (hair, beard, etc.) that are among his alleged legacies. Although the sources concerning the Sasanian realm of influence for the 6th century AD, which represents the time period before the beginning of Islam, are poor, the sources for the Byzantine provinces of Syria and Iraq in the same period, complemented by Syriac Christian writings, provide a relatively superior quality.

Most Islamic history was transmitted orally until after the rise of the Abbasid Caliphate. At the same time the study of the earliest periods in Islamic history is made difficult by a lack of sources. The stories were written in the form of “founding conquest stories” based on nostalgia for the golden age then. Humphrey, quoted by Antoine Borrut, explains that the stories related to this period were created according to a pact-betrayal-redemption principle.

There are a relatively small number of contemporaneous or near-contemporaneous non-Muslim sources which attest to the existence of Muhammad and are valuable both in themselves and for comparison with Muslim sources. Non-Islamic testimonies about Muhammad's life describe him as the leader of the Saracens, believed to be descendants of Ishmael, lived in the regions Arabia Petrae and Arabia Deserta in the north. According to some sources, Muhammad is not a name but a title.

== History ==
=== Background ===
A delegation from Yathrib, consisting of the representatives of the twelve important clans of Medina, invited Muhammad as a neutral outsider to serve as the chief arbitrator for the community. There had been conflict in Yathrib between its Arab and Jewish tribes for around a hundred years prior. The recurring disagreements, fighting and killing over competing claims, especially after the Battle of Bu'ath in which all the clans were involved, rendered the tribal conceptions of blood-feud and eye for an eye justice unworkable without a neutral authority to adjudicate in disputed cases. The delegation from Medina pledged themselves and their fellow-citizens to accept Muhammad into their community and to protect him as one of their own.

Muhammad instructed his followers to emigrate to Medina until virtually all of his followers had left Mecca. Being alarmed at the departure of Muslims, according to the tradition, the Meccans plotted to assassinate him. He instructed his cousin and future son-in-law Ali to sleep in his bed to trick the assassins that he had stayed (and to fight them off in his stead) and secretly slipped away from the town. By 622, Muhammad had emigrated to Medina, then known as Yathrib, a large agricultural oasis. Following the emigration, the Meccans seized the properties of the Muslim emigrants in Mecca.

Among the things Muhammad did in order to settle the longstanding grievances among the tribes of Medina was drafting a document known as the Constitution of Medina (date debated), establishing a kind of brotherhood among the eight Medinan tribes and Muslim emigrants from Mecca, which specified the rights and duties of all citizens and the relationship of the different communities in Medina (including that of the Muslim community to other communities specifically the Jews and other "Peoples of the Book"). The community defined in the Constitution of Medina, umma, had a religious outlook but was also shaped by the practical considerations and substantially preserved the legal forms of the old Arab tribes.

==== Relationship with followers of Abrahamic religions ====
The first group of pagan converts to Islam in Medina were the clans who had not produced great leaders for themselves but had suffered from warlike leaders from other clans. This was followed by the general acceptance of Islam by the pagan population of Medina, apart from some exceptions. This was, according to Ibn Ishaq, influenced by the conversion to Islam of Sa'd ibn Mua'dh, one of the prominent leaders in Medina.

In the course of Muhammad proselytizing in Mecca, he viewed Christians and Jews (both of whom he referred to as "People of the Book") as natural allies, part of the Abrahamic religions, sharing the core principles of his teachings, and anticipated their acceptance and support. Muslims, like Jews, were at that time praying towards Jerusalem. In the Constitution of Medina, Muhammad demanded the Jews' political loyalty in return for religious and cultural autonomy in many treaties.

The Jewish clans however did not obey these treaties because of a feud with the Muslims though in the course of time there were a few converts from them. After his migration to Medina, Muhammad's attitude towards Christians and Jews changed "because of experience of treachery". Norman Stillman states:

During this fateful time, fraught with tension after the Hijra [migration to Medina], when Muhammad encountered contradiction, ridicule and rejection from the Jewish scholars in Medina, he came to adopt a radically more negative view of the people of the Book who had received earlier scriptures. This attitude was already evolving in the third Meccan period as the Prophet became more aware of the antipathy between Jews and Christians and the disagreements and strife amongst members of the same religion. The Qur'an at this time states that it will "relate [correctly] to the Children of Israel most of that about which they differ" 27:76.

=== Internal disputes ===
A map of the Badr campaign

Economically uprooted by their Meccan persecutors, the Muslim migrants turned to raiding Meccan caravans to respond to their persecution and to provide sustenance for their Muslim families, thus initiating armed conflict between the Muslims and the pagan Quraysh of Mecca. Muhammad delivered Qur'anic verses permitting the Muslims, "those who have been expelled from their homes", to fight the Meccans in opposition to persecution (see Qur'an Sura 22 (Al-Hajj) Ayat 39-40). These attacks provoked and pressured Mecca by interfering with trade, and allowed the Muslims to acquire wealth, power and prestige while working toward their ultimate goal of inducing Mecca's submission to the new faith.

In March 624, Muhammad led some three hundred warriors in a raid on a Meccan merchant caravan. The Muslims set an ambush for the Meccans at Badr. Aware of the plan, the Meccan caravan eluded the Muslims. Meanwhile, a force from Mecca was sent to protect the caravan. The force did not return home upon hearing that the caravan was safe. The battle of Badr began in March 624. Though outnumbered more than three to one, the Muslims won the battle, killing at least forty-five Meccans and taking seventy prisoners for ransom; only fourteen Muslims died. They had also succeeded in killing many of the Meccan leaders, including Abu Jahl. Muhammad himself did not fight, directing the battle from a nearby hut alongside Abu Bakr. In the weeks following the battle, Meccans visited Medina in order to ransom captives from Badr. Many of these had belonged to wealthy families, and were likely ransomed for a considerable sum. Those captives who were not sufficiently influential or wealthy were usually freed without ransom. Muhammad's decision was that those prisoners who refused to end their persecution of Muslims and were wealthy but did not ransom themselves should be killed. Muhammad ordered the immediate execution of two Quraysh men without entertaining offers for their release. Both men, which included Uqba ibn Abi Mu'ayt, had personally attempted to kill Muhammad in Mecca. The raiders had won a lot of treasure, and the battle helped to stabilize the Medinan community. Muhammad and his followers saw in the victory a confirmation of their faith and a prime importance in the affairs of Medina. Those remaining pagans in Medina were very bitter about the advance of Islam. In particular Asma bint Marwan and Abu 'Afak had composed verses insulting some of the Muslims and thereby violated the Constitution of Medina to which they belonged. These two were assassinated and Muhammad did not disapprove of it. No one dared to take vengeance on them, and some of the members of the clan of Asma bint Marwan who had previously converted to Islam in secret, now professed openly. This marked an end to the overt opposition to Muhammad among the pagans in Medina.

Muhammad expelled from Medina the Banu Qaynuqa, one of the three main Jewish tribes. Jewish opposition "may well have been for political as well as religious reasons". On religious grounds, the Jews were skeptical of the possibility of a non-Jewish prophet, and also had concerns about possible incompatibilities between the Qur'an and their own scriptures. The Qur'an's response regarding the possibility of a non-Jew being a prophet was that Abraham was not a Jew. The Qur'an also stated that it was "restoring the pure monotheism of Abraham which had been corrupted in various, clearly specified, ways by Jews and Christians". According to Francis Edward Peters, "The Jews also began secretly to connive with Muhammad's enemies in Mecca to overthrow him."

Following the battle of Badr, Muhammad also made mutual-aid alliances with a number of Bedouin tribes to protect his community from attacks from the northern part of Hejaz.

==== Conflicts with the Quraysh ====
The attack at Badr committed Muhammad to total war with Meccans, who were now eager to avenge their defeat. To maintain their economic prosperity, the Meccans needed to restore their prestige, which had been lost at Badr. The Meccans sent out a small party for a raid on Medina to restore confidence and reconnoitre. The party retreated immediately after a surprise and speedy attack but with minor damages; there was no combat. In the ensuing months, Muhammad led expeditions on tribes allied with Mecca and sent out a raid on a Meccan caravan. Abu Sufyan subsequently gathered an army of three thousand men and set out for an attack on Medina. They were accompanied by some prominent women of Mecca, such as Hind bint Utbah, Abu Sufyan's wife, who had lost family members at Badr. These women provided encouragement in keeping with Bedouin custom, calling out the names of the dead at Badr.

A scout alerted Muhammad of the Meccan army's presence and numbers a day later. The next morning, at the Muslim conference of war, there was dispute over how best to repel the Meccans. Muhammad and many of the senior figures suggested that it would be safer to fight within Medina and take advantage of its heavily fortified strongholds. Younger Muslims argued that the Meccans were destroying their crops, and that huddling in the strongholds would destroy Muslim prestige. Muhammad eventually conceded to the wishes of the latter, and readied the Muslim force for battle. Thus, Muhammad led his force outside to the mountain of Uhud (where the Meccans had camped) and fought the Battle of Uhud on March 23.

Although the Muslim army had the best of the early encounters, indiscipline on the part of tactically placed archers led to a tactical defeat for the Muslim army, with 75 Muslims killed. However, the Meccans failed to achieve their goal of destroying the Muslims completely. The Meccans did not occupy the town and withdrew to Mecca, since they were unable to attack Muhammad's position again, owing to military losses, low morale and the possibility of Muslim resistance in the town. There was also hope that Abd Allah ibn Ubayy leading a group of Muslims in Medina could be won over by diplomacy. Following the defeat, Muhammad's detractors in Medina said that if the victory at Badr was proof of the genuineness of his mission, then the defeat at Uhud was proof that his mission was not genuine. Muhammad subsequently delivered Qur'anic verses 133-135 and 160-162 from the Al Imran sura indicating that the loss, however, was partly a punishment for disobedience and partly a test for steadfastness.

=== The rousing of the nomads ===
In the battle of Uhud, the Meccans had collected all the available men from the Quraysh and the neighboring tribes friendly to them but had not succeeded in destroying the Muslim community. In order to raise a more powerful army, Abu Sufyan attracted the support of the great nomadic tribes to the north and east of Medina, using propaganda about Muhammad's weakness, promises of treasure, memories of the prestige of Quraysh and straight bribes.

Muhammad's policy in the next two years after the battle of Uhud was to prevent as best he could the formation of alliances against him. Whenever alliances of tribesmen against Medina were formed, he sent out an expedition to break it up. When Muhammad heard of men massing with hostile intentions against Medina, he reacted with severity. One example is the assassination of Ka'b ibn al-Ashraf, a member of the Jewish tribe of Banu Nadir who had gone to Mecca and written poems that had helped rouse the Meccans' grief, anger and desire for revenge after the battle of Badr (see the main article for other reasons for killing of Ka'b given in the historiographical sources). Around a year later, Muhammad expelled the Jewish Banu Nadir from Medina.

Muhammad's attempts to prevent formation of confederation against him were not successful, although he was able to augment his own forces and keep many tribes from joining the confederation.

=== Siege of Medina ===
Abu Sufyan, the military leader of the Quraysh, with the help of Banu Nadir, had mustered a force numbering 10,000 men. Muhammad was able to prepare a force of about 3,000 men. He had however adopted a new form of defense, unknown in Arabia at that time: Muslims had dug trenches wherever Medina lay open to cavalry attack. The idea is credited to a Persian convert to Islam, Salman. The siege of Medina began on 31 March 627 and lasted for two weeks. Abu Sufyan's troops were unprepared for the fortifications they were confronted with, and after an ineffectual siege, the coalition decided to go home. The Qur'an discusses this battle in verses 9-27 of sura 33 Al-Ahzab.

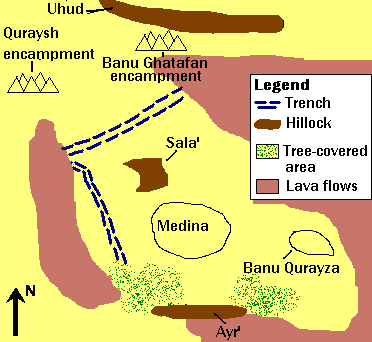
Battle of Khandaq (Battle of the Trench)

During the Battle of the Trench, the Jewish tribe of Banu Qurayza who were located at the south of Medina were charged with treachery. After the retreat of the coalition, Muslims besieged Banu Qurayza, the remaining major Jewish tribe in Medina. After the Qurayẓah were found to be complicit with the enemy during the Battle of the Trench, the Muslim general Sa'd ibn Mu'adh ordered the men to be put to death and the women and children to be enslaved. Moreover, Muslims believe that the Prophet did not order the execution of the Jews of Medina, but many Western historians believe that he must have been, at the very least, informed of it. Regardless, "this tragic episode cast a shadow upon the relations between the two communities for many centuries, even though the Jews, a "People of the Book" [...] generally enjoyed the protection of their lives, property, and religion under Islamic rule and fared better in the Muslim world than in the West." Some sources state the Banu Qurayza surrendered and all the men, apart from a few who converted to Islam, were beheaded, while all the women and children were enslaved. In dealing with Muhammad's treatment of the Jews of Medina, aside from political explanations, Arab historians and biographers have explained it as "the punishment of the Medina Jews, who were invited to convert and refused, perfectly exemplify the Quran's tales of what happened to those who rejected the prophets of old." F.E. Peters, a western scholar of Islam, states that Muhammad's treatment of Jews of Medina was essentially political being prompted by what Muhammad read as treasonous and not some transgression of the law of God. Peters adds that Muhammad was possibly emboldened by his military successes and also wanted to push his advantage. Economical motivations according to Peters also existed since the poorness of the Meccan migrants was a source of concern for Muhammad. Peters argues that Muhammad's treatment of the Jews of Medina was "quite extraordinary", "matched by nothing in the Qur'an", and is "quite at odds with Muhammad's treatment of the Jews he encountered outside Medina." According to Welch, Muhammad's treatment of the three major Jewish tribes brought Muhammad closer to his goal of organizing a community strictly on a religious basis. He adds that some Jews from other families were, however, allowed to remain in Medina. Rabbi Samuel Rosenblatt has said that Muhammad's policies were not directed exclusively against Jews (referring to his conflicts with Jewish tribes) and that Muhammad was more severe with his pagan Arab kinsmen.

However, some historians and Islamic scholars have argued that the punishment did not apply to every male of the Banu Qurayza. A report in Sunan Abi Dawud attributed to Muhammad's companion Abd Allah ibn Umar states that after the execution of the tribe's fighting men, "some of them who associated with the Messenger of Allah" and weren't involved with the act of treason, were granted protection and later embraced Islam. This goes against the belief that the men of Banu Qurayza were executed for refusing to convert to Islam. al-Shafi'i similarly wrote that not all members of the tribe participated in the treason, stating that "a small party (nafar)" dissociated themselves from those responsible, thereby preserving their lives and property. al-Ghazali likewise states that those members of Banu Qurayza who refused to betray Muhammad during the Battle of the Trench were permitted to leave freely as a reward for their loyalty. Abu al-A'la Mawdudi also records that Muhammad pardoned Zabir ibn Bata and 'Amr ibn Sa'd because of their previous assistance to Muslims and their opposition to the tribe's breach of the treaty. Resit Haylamaz similarly lists several members of the tribe—including Amr ibn Su'da, Tha labah, Usayd, Asad ibn Ubayd and others, as having been forgiven rather than executed. Professor Meir J. Kister also discusses these reports and notes the existence of traditions describing exceptions to the general punishment. Historians W.N. Arafat and Barakat Ahmad, have also disputed the historicity of the incident. Ahmad argues that only the leading members of the tribe were killed. Arafat argued based on accounts by Malik ibn Anas and Ibn Hajar that Ibn Ishaq gathered information from descendants of the Qurayza Jews, who exaggerated the details of the incident. He also maintained that not all adult males were killed but only those who actually fought in the battle, however, William Montgomery Watt described this argument as "not entirely convincing."

According to Norman Stillman, the incident cannot be judged by present-day moral standards. Citing Deut. 20:13–14 as an example, Stillman states that the slaughter of adult males and the enslavement of women and children—though no doubt causing bitter suffering—was common practice throughout the ancient world. According to Rudi Paret, adverse public opinion was more a point of concern to Muhammad when he had some date palms cut down during a siege, than after this incident. Esposito also argues that in Muhammad's time, traitors were executed and points to similar situations in the Bible. John Esposito notes that Muhammad’s motivation was primarily political rather than racial or theological, aiming to unify Arabia under Muslim leadership and establish stable governance.

In the siege of Medina, the Meccans had exerted their utmost strength towards the destruction of the Muslim community. Their failure resulted in a significant loss of prestige; their trade with Syria was gone. Following the battle of trench, Muhammad made two expeditions to the north which ended without any fighting. While returning from one of these two expeditions (or some years earlier according to other early accounts), an accusation of adultery was made against Aisha, Muhammad's wife. Aisha was exonerated from the accusations when Muhammad announced that he had received a revelation, verse 4 in the An-Nur sura, confirming Aisha's innocence and directing that charges of adultery be supported by four eyewitnesses.

=== Truce of al-Hudaybiya ===
Although Qur'anic verses had been received from God commanding the Hajj, the Muslims had not performed it due to the enmity of the Quraysh. In the month of Shawwal 628, Muhammad ordered his followers to obtain sacrificial animals and to make preparations for a pilgrimage (umrah) to Mecca, saying that God had promised him the fulfillment of this goal in a vision where he was shaving his head after the completion of the Hajj. According to Lewis, Muhammad felt strong enough to attempt an attack on Mecca, but on the way it became clear that the attempt was premature and the expedition was converted into a peaceful pilgrimage. Andrae disagrees, writing that the Muslim state of ihram (which restricted their freedom of action) and the paucity of arms carried indicated that the pilgrimage was always intended to be pacific. Most Islamic scholars agree with Andrae's view. Upon hearing of the approaching 1,400 Muslims, the Quraysh sent out a force of 200 cavalry to halt them. Muhammad evaded them by taking a more difficult route, thereby reaching al-Hudaybiya, just outside Mecca. According to Watt, although Muhammad's decision to make the pilgrimage was based on his dream, he was at the same time demonstrating to the pagan Meccans that Islam does not threaten the prestige of their sanctuary, and that Islam was an Arabian religion.

Negotiations commenced with emissaries going to and from Mecca. While these continued, rumors spread that one of the Muslim negotiators, Uthman ibn Affan, had been killed by the Quraysh. Muhammad responded by calling upon the pilgrims to make a pledge not to flee (or to stick with Muhammad, whatever decision he made) if the situation descended into war with Mecca. This pledge became known as the "Pledge of Good Pleasure" (Arabic: بيعة الرضوان, bay'at al-ridhwān) or the "Pledge of the Tree." News of Uthman's safety, however, allowed for negotiations to continue, and the Treaty of al-Hudaybiya, scheduled to last ten years was eventually signed between the Muslims and the Quraysh. The main points of treaty were the following:

1. The two parties and their allies should desist from hostilities against each other.
2. Muhammad, should not perform Hajj this year but in the next year, Mecca will be evacuated for three days for Muslims to perform Hajj.
3. Muhammad should send back any Meccan who had gone to Medina without the permission of his or her protector (according to William Montgomery Watt, this presumably refers to minors or women).
4. It was allowed for both Muhammad and the Quraysh to enter into alliance with others.

Many Muslims were not satisfied with the terms of the treaty. However, the Qur'anic sura Al-Fath (The Victory) assured the Muslims that the expedition from which they were now returning must be considered a victorious one. It was only later that Muhammad's followers would realise the benefit behind this treaty. These benefits, according to Welch, included the inducing of the Meccans to recognise Muhammad as an equal; a cessation of military activity posing well for the future; and gaining the admiration of Meccans who were impressed by the incorporation of the pilgrimage rituals.

After signing the truce, Muhammad made an expedition against the Jewish oasis of Khaybar. The explanation given by western scholars of Islam for this attack ranges from the presence of the Banu Nadir in Khaybar, who were inciting hostilities along with neighboring Arab tribes against Muhammad, to deflecting from what appeared to some Muslims as the inconclusive result of the truce of al-Hudaybiya, increasing Muhammad's prestige among his followers and capturing booty. According to Muslim tradition, Muhammad also sent letters to many rulers of the world, asking them to convert to Islam (the exact date are given variously in the sources). Hence he sent messengers (with letters) to Heraclius of the Byzantine Empire (the eastern Roman Empire), Khosrau of Persia, the chief of Yemen and to some others. Most critical scholars doubt this tradition, however. In the years following the truce of al-Hudaybiya, Muhammad sent his forces against the Arabs of Mu'tah on Byzantine soil in Transjordania since according to the tradition, they had murdered Muhammad's envoy. Muslims were defeated in this battle.

=== Conquest of Mecca and subsequent military expeditions ===
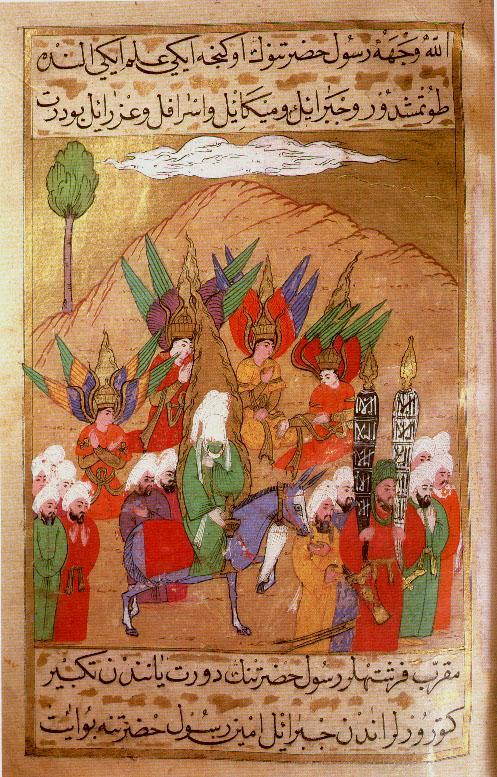
Muhammad and the sahaba advancing on Mecca. The angels Gabriel, Michael, Israfil and Azrael, are also in the painting.

In Ramadan 8 AH (around October 629), Muhammad left for Mecca with approximately 10,000 of his sahaba aiming to capture the city from the Quraysh following a violation of the terms of the Treaty of al-Hudaybiya by the Banu Bakr, who were allies of the Quraysh, after they attacked the Banū Khuzaʽah, allies of the Muslims. The Treaty had called for a 10-year truce and ceasefire between the Muslims, the Quraysh and their respective allies. Muhammad arrived at Mecca a week from his departure, dividing the army into four regiments, each entering Mecca from one point of entry. The conquest was largely bloodless and the Quraysh eventually surrendered without putting up a fight.

Following the Conquest of Mecca, Muhammad was informed of a military threat from the confederate tribes of Hawazin who were readying an army twice as strong as Muhammad and the sahaba. They were joined by the Thaqif inhabiting in the city of Ta’if who had adopted an anti-Meccan policy due to the decline of the prestige of Meccans. Both tribes were subsequently defeated in the Battle of Hunayn. Muhammad subsequently launched an expedition against the Byzantine Empire and their Ghassanid allies in the north in the Expedition of Tabuk. Although Muhammad did not make contact with hostile forces at Tabuk, he received the submission of some of the local chiefs of the region. Following this expedition, the Banu Thaqif and other Bedouins submitted to Muhammad in order to be safe from attack and to benefit from the bounty of the wars.

Following the Conquest of Mecca and these events, Muhammad would perform the Farewell Pilgrimage and return to Medina, where he would fall ill for several days with a headache and weakness. He died on Monday, June 8, 632, in the city, being buried where the home of his wife Aisha had been. It has since been modified several times and is now enclosed under the Green Dome within Al-Masjid al-Nabawi in Medina.

== See also ==
- Muhammad at Medina, a book
- Timeline of Medina
- Timeline of the history of Islam (7th century)

== Sources ==
- Donner, Fred (1998). Narratives of Islamic Origins: The Beginnings of Islamic Historical Writing. Darwin Press, Incorporated. ISBN 0878501274.
- Donner, Fred (2010). Muhammad and the Believers: At the Origins of Islam. Harvard University Press. ISBN 978-0-674-50375-5.
- Nigosian, Solomon Alexander (2004). Islam: Its History, Teaching, and Practices. Indiana University Press. ISBN 978-0-253-21627-4.
- Robinson, Chase F. (2010). "Introduction / The rise of Islam, 600 705". In Robinson, Chase F. (ed.). The New Cambridge History of Islam. Vol. 1: The Formation of the Islamic World, Sixth to Eleventh Centuries. Cambridge University Press. pp. 1–15, 173–225. ISBN 978-0-521-83823-8.
- Vansina, Jan (1985). Oral Tradition as History. James Currey Publishers. ISBN 978-0852550076.
