= Abu Basir =

Male Sahabah

Abu Basir (Arabic: أبو بصير), also known as Utbah ibn Aseed (Arabic: عتبة بن أسيد), was a contemporary of Muhammad from the Banu Thaqif tribe.

He had fled from Mecca after the Treaty of Hudaybiyyah, away from the Quraysh, and he sought refuge among the Muslims of Medina, but was asked to return since because of the treaty between the Muslims and Quraysh, stating that the Muslims couldn't take in refugees who converted from the Quraysh. The two men from Quraysh who were pursuing Abu Basir grabbed him and tied him to their caravan to return him back to Mecca. However, Abu Basir managed to escape from the ropes and flee. To his dismay one escaped alive and the next day reached the Muslim caravan demanding Abu Basir to be handed over. Again Muhammad ordered Abu Basir to go with him since he would be a war kindler. Abu Basir understood that he needed to leave and went for the shore, there Abu Jandal ibn Suhayl joined him after freeing himself from the Quraysh in Mecca. Eventually whenever a Muslim escaped Mecca, they joined Abu Basir, until they became a big group.

It is said that Basir was on his deathbed when a letter from Muhammad with permission to return to Medina reached him. He died while holding Muhammad's letter in his hand.

Ibn Hajar al-Asqalani's Fath al-Bari contains one of the more detailed accounts of Abu Basir's life.

== Sources ==
- Muir, William (1861). The Life of Mahomet [sic] and History of Islam. Vol. 4. London: Smith, Elder & Co.
- Muir, William (1878). The Life of Mahomet [sic]: From Original Sources. London: Smith, Elder & Co.
- Rubin, Uri (1 January 1988). "Muhammad' s Curse of Mudar and the Blockade of Mecca". Journal of the Economic and Social History of the Orient. 31 (3): 249–264. doi:10.1163/156852088X00115. ISSN 1568-5209.
