= First Pilgrimage =

First pilgrimage of Islamic prophet Muhammad

The First Pilgrimage or Umrah of Dhu'l-Qada (Pilgrimage of the 11th month) was the first pilgrimage that the Islamic prophet Muhammad and the Muslims made after the Migration to Medina. It took place on the morning of the fourth day of Dhu al-Qi'dah 7 AH (629 CE), after the Treaty of Hudaybiyyah 6 AH (628 CE). The entire event was three days long.

A pilgrimage that occurs during the month of Dhu al-Hijjah is named a "major pilgrimage", or just "pilgrimage" (Arabic: حَـجّ, Ḥajj), while pilgrimages of all other months are called "minor pilgrimage" (Arabic: عُـمْـرَة, ‘Umrah).

== History ==
Muhammad, the prophet, reported that from the age of 40, he was receiving revelations from God. He and his followers, called Muslims, were persecuted by the ruling clan of Mecca, the Quraysh, and forced to leave to the northern city of Medina. Several armed confrontations followed, along with the Muslims attempting a return pilgrimage to Mecca in 628, as directed by one of the revelations. They were rejected by the Quraysh, but the Meccans did agree to a truce, and the Treaty of Hudaybiyyah had a provision that the Muslims could return peacefully to Mecca for a pilgrimage in 629.

== Pilgrimage ==
Ar-Raḥīq Al-Makhtūm (Arabic: ٱلـرَّحِـيْـق ٱلْـمَـخْـتُـوْم, "The Sealed Nectar"), in the chapter The Compensatory ‘Umrah (Lesser Pilgrimage) the event is described as follows:

When Dhul Qa‘da month approached towards the close of the seventh year A.H., the Prophet ordered his people, and the men who witnessed Al-Hudaibiyah Truce Treaty in particular, to make preparations to perform the lesser pilgrimage. He proceeded with 2000 men besides some women and children [Fath Al-Bari 7/700], and 60 camels for sacrifice, to visit the Holy Sanctuary in Makkah. The Muslims took their weapons with them fearing the treachery of the Quraishites, but left them with a party of two hundred men at a place some eight miles from Makkah. They entered the city with the swords in their scabbards [Za'd Al-Ma'ad 2/151; Fath Al-Bari 7/700], with the Prophet at their head on his she-camel, Al-Qaswa’, while the surrounding Companions attentively focusing their look on him, all saying: "Here I am! at Your service O Allâh!" The Quraishites had left the place and retired to their tents on the adjoining hills. The Muslims performed the usual circumambulation vigorously and briskly; and on recommendation by the Prophet they did their best to appear strong and steadfast in their circumambulation as the polytheists had spread rumours that they were weak because the fever of Yathrib (Madinah) had sapped their strength. They were ordered to run in the first three rounds and then walk in the remaining ones. The Makkans meanwhile aligned on the top of Qu‘aiqa‘an Mount watching the Muslims, tongue-tied at witnessing their strength and devotion.

== See also ==
- The Farewell Pilgrimage
