= Al-Rayah Mosque, Mecca =

Historically significant mosque in Mecca, Saudi Arabia

- Location within Saudi Arabia

Religion
- Affiliation: Islam
- Ecclesiastical or organisational status: Mosque

Location
- Location: Makkah, Hejaz
- Coordinates: 24°28′44″N 39°36′1″E

Architecture
- Style: Islamic

Al-Rayah Mosque (Arabic: مسجد الراية) was one of the historic mosques located in the Al-Judariyyah district of Mecca, Saudi Arabia.

== Name ==
The mosque was given this name because it was built on the spot where the Prophet Muhammad planted his banner on the day of the Conquest of Mecca, which took place in Ramadan of the 8th year after Hijrah.

== History ==
- The mosque was originally built after the Conquest of Mecca.
- During the Abbasid era, in 640 AH, the mosque was rebuilt.
- In 1431 AH, the authorities decided to demolish Al-Rayah Mosque as part of the northern expansion project of the Grand Mosque, aimed at accommodating the increasing numbers of pilgrims and visitors.

== Significance ==
The mosque held historical importance connected to the memory of the Islamic conquest and the early development of Mecca.

- It was an important symbol marking the place where the Prophet raised the banner of the Muslims upon entering Makkah.
- Given its close proximity to the Grand Mosque, the site carried spiritual and historical value.
- The historically important mosque was demolished with the excuse to facilitate the Masjid al-Haram expansion project, which was carried out to better serve pilgrims.

== See also ==
- Masjid al-Haram
- Mecca
- Holiest sites in Islam
- Islam in Saudi Arabia
- List of mosques in Saudi Arabia
- Mina
- Conquest of Mecca
