= Abdullah ibn Khatal =

- عبدالله بن خطل
- Died: 629

Abdullah ibn Khatal (Arabic: عبدالله بن خطل) (died 629 CE) was a Muslim tax collector who committed treason against the State of Medina by defecting to Mecca and becoming an apostate. He was killed shortly after the Conquest of Mecca on the orders of Muhammad being one of the four inhabitants of Mecca not granted immunity. It is said that he was hanging to the curtains of the Kaaba in Mecca, where he attempted to take refuge but was executed before being able to enter the Ka'aba.
