= Pledge of the Tree =

Event in early Islamic History

The Pledge of the Tree (Arabic: بيعة الشَّجَرَة, romanized: bayʿat ash-shajara) was a pledge that was sworn by companions to the Islamic prophet Muhammad prior to the Treaty of al-Hudaybiya (6 AH/628 CE). Sworn under a tree, it was to avenge the rumoured death of Uthman.

== Background ==
In March 628 CE (6 AH), Muhammad traveled to Mecca to perform the ritual pilgrimage of Umrah. The Quraysh deployed forces around Mecca to prevent the Muslims from entering the city, determined to offer resistance even though the Muslims had no intention or preparation for battle. Muhammad camped outside Mecca at Hudaybiyyah and sent Uthman ibn Affan as his envoy to meet with the leaders of Quraysh and negotiate their entry. Uthman remained in Mecca longer than expected, and his prolonged absence led to rumors that he had been killed by the Quraysh. On this occasion, Muhammad gathered his nearly 1,400 Sahaba and called them to pledge their loyalty and readiness to fight if necessary after reports of Uthman's death. This pledge took place under a tree and was thus known as the Pledge of the Tree.

== Aftermath ==
The pledge was successful in demonstrating to the Quraysh the determination of the Muslims. They soon released Uthman and sent an ambassador of their own, Suhayl ibn Amr, to negotiate the terms of a treaty that later became known as the Treaty of Al-Hudaybiyah.

== Significance ==
The people who took the pledge, also known as the Companions of the Tree (اصحاب الشجرة aṣḥāb ash-shajarah) are held in high regard by Muslims in general and Sunnis in particular. After the pledge, verses were revealed in the Qur'an commemorating and appreciating the pledge and those who made it:

Certainly Allah was well pleased with the believers when they swore allegiance to you under the tree, and He knew what was in their hearts, so He sent down tranquillity on them and rewarded them with a near victory.

— Sura Al-Fath, Ayah 18, Quran 48:18 ^{(Translated by Shakir)}

Due to this verse, the pledge is also known as the Pledge of Acceptance as it was said to be a cause for God's acceptance.

Rashid Rida explained that every Companion of the Prophet who pledged was regarded universally by Islamic teaching as special, with such explanation in line with Ibn Hajar al-Asqalani's explanation of a Hadith in Sahih al-Bukhari regarding the special position of the pledge attendance, as the revelation of Hadith Qudsi regarding God's will towards them.
