= Al-Fath =

48th chapter of the Qur'an

Surah 48 of the Quran
الْفَتْح Al-Fatḥ The Victory
- Qira'ah; English text
- Classification: Medinan
- Position: Juzʼ 26
- No. of verses: 29
- No. of Rukus: 4
- No. of words: 560
- No. of letters: 2,510

Al-Fath (Arabic: الفتح, al-fatḥ; meaning: "The Victory") is the 48th chapter (surah) of the Qur'an with 29 verses (ayat). The surah was revealed in Medina in the sixth year of the Hijrah, on the occasion of the Treaty of Hudaybiya between the Muslim city-state of Madinah and Makkan polytheists. It mentions this victory, then criticizes the attitudes of the hypocrites, continues with further promises to the Muslims, and ends by mentioning certain important virtues of the Muslim community.

The chapter gets its name from the opening verse, which states "Indeed, We have granted you a clear triumph..." in direct reference to the Treaty which was signed through cooperation between the opposing forces and without bloodshed. The reason this treaty, and therefore chapter, is called a "clear triumph" is largely believed to be because of its peaceful nature.

== Summary ==
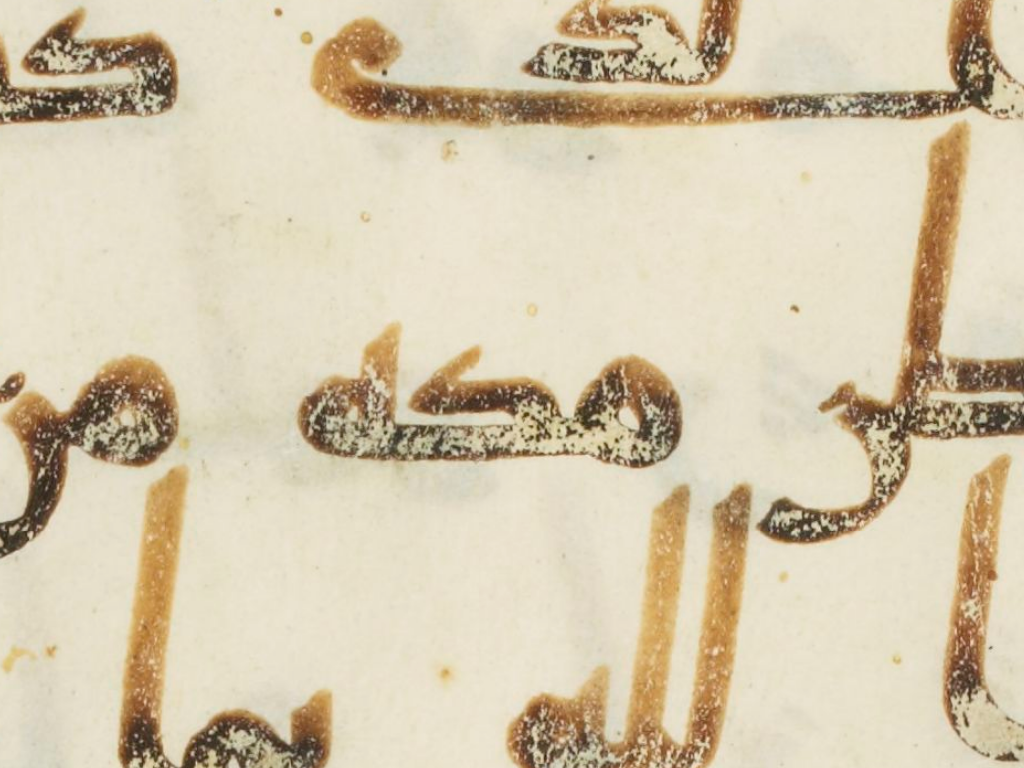
Mecca mentioned in Quranic manuscript Codex Arabe 331 (Q48:24)

- 1-3 The victory (at Ḳhaibar)
- 4-7 The mighty God the comforter of true believers, but the punisher of hypocrites
- 8-10 Loyalty to Muhammad is loyalty to God
- 11-14 Bedouin Arabs denounced for their treachery at Hudaibiyah and their subsequent hypocrisy
- 15-16 The Bedouin Arabs refused a share of the booty taken at Ḳhaibar, but encouraged with promises
- 17 Those alone excused from going to war who are incapacitated
- 18-19 Muslim fidelity at Hudaibiyah rewarded by the victory at Ḳhaibar and much spoil taken there
- 20-24 Many spoils assured to the believers though God had prevented the plunder of Makkah
- 25-26 God spared Makkah in the expedition to Hudaibiyah out of compassion
- 27-29 The conquest of Makkah the divine attestation to Muhammad’s apostleship and the religion of Islam

== Details ==
=== 10 The Soul ===
48:10 focuses on the importance of being dedicated to God. Those who do not dedicate themselves to God and remain that way will have their souls suffer. Those who stay dedicated to God will be rewarded by God.

=== 16 Predictions ===
48:16 contains many predictions in this surah, such as:

- God would help the believers and favor them with great victories;
- those who stayed behind from the Campaign of Minor Pilgrimage would try to excuse themselves with false pretexts;
- they would desire to participate in the campaign against Khaybar that was to take place following the Treaty of Hudaybiyyah with the aim of taking gains of war;
- the Muslims would have to fight against powerful tribes or states in the future;
- the Muslims would take abundant war-gains in battles to come in the future;
- Muhammad and his Companions would visit the Ka'bah in safety, thus completing the Minor Pilgrimage the year after they had intended;
- God would complete His favor upon the Messenger;
- Islam would continue to flourish so powerfully and speedily that it would amaze both Muslims and others.

=== 18-19 Treaty of Hudaybiyyah ===
48:18-19 is regarding the Treaty of Hudaybiyyah.

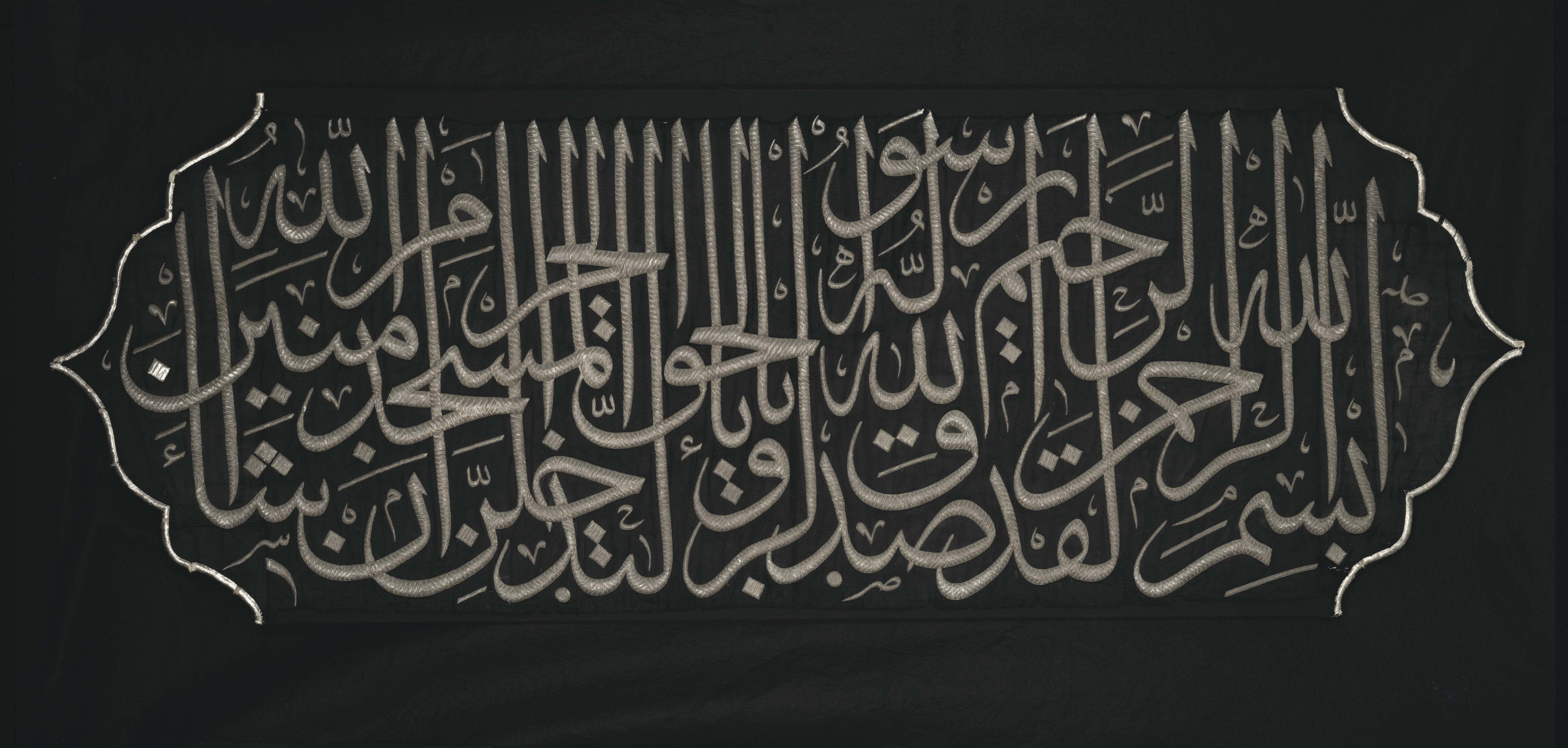
Quotation from verse 27 on a textile panel of the sitara for the door of the Kaaba, 19th century

=== 27 The first pilgrimage ===
48:27 is regarding The first pilgrimage.

== Al-Fath in the hadith ==
- Upon its revelation, Muhammad remarked, 'Tonight there has been revealed to me a Surah which is dearer to me than that on which the sun shines (i.e. the world).'

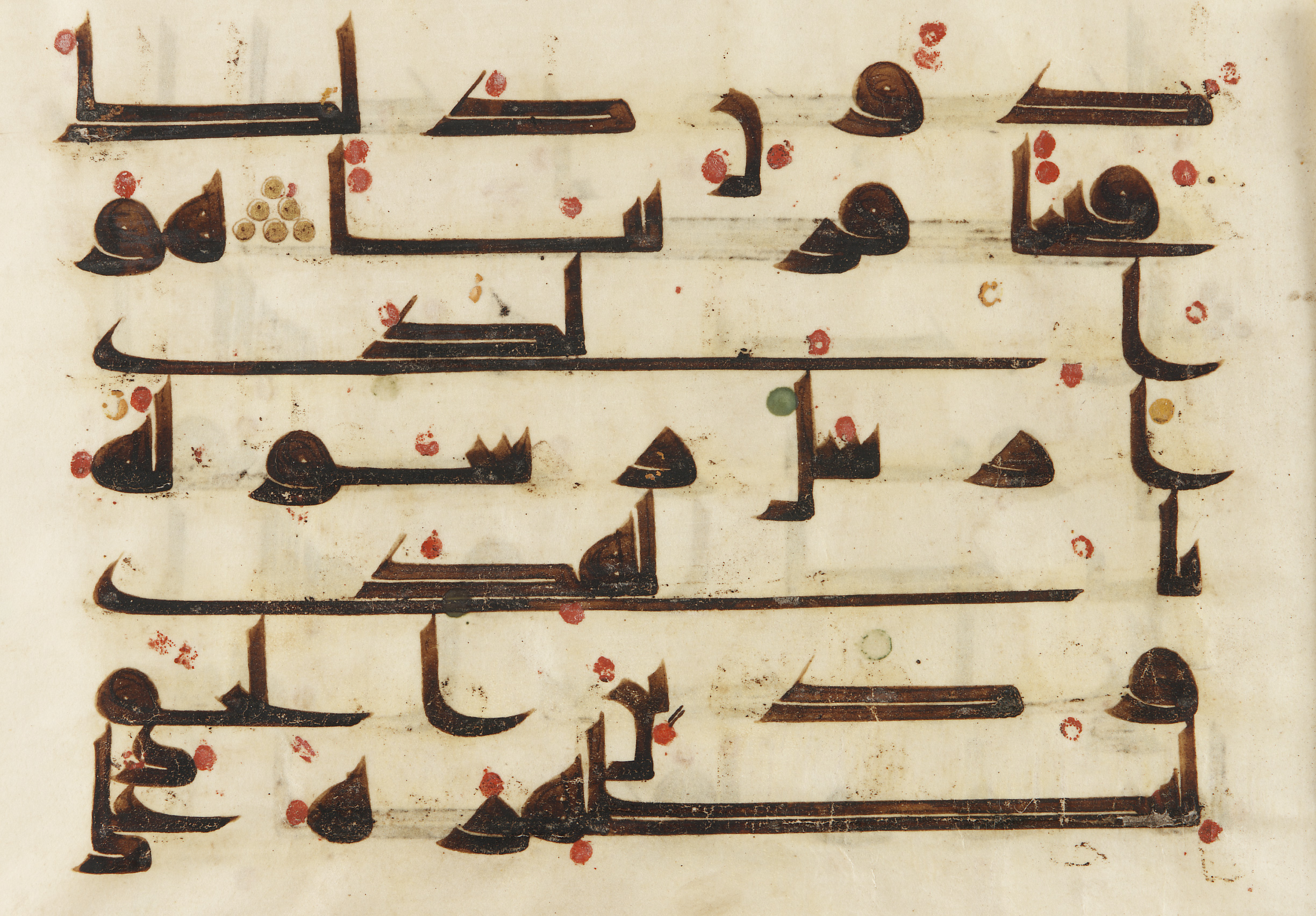
Folio from a Quran in Kufic script, Abbasid dynasty, Near East or North Africa. Ink and color on parchment, 23.9 × 33.3 cm. Part of Al-Fath Sura.

- When consulted to broker peace during a later war, Sahl ibn Hunaif said, 'Blame yourselves! I remember how, on the day of Al-Hudaibiya, if we had been allowed to choose fighting, we would have fought (the pagans). At that time 'Umar came (to the Prophet) and said, "Aren't we on the right (path) and they (pagans) in the wrong? Won't our killed persons go to Paradise, and theirs in the Fire?" The Prophet replied, "Yes." Umar further said, "Then why should we let our religion be degraded and return before Allah has settled the matter between us?" The Prophet said, "O the son of Al-Khattab! No doubt, I am Allah's Apostle and Allah will never neglect me." So Umar left the place angrily and he was so impatient that he went to Abu Bakr and said, "O Abu Bakr! Aren't we on the right (path) and they (pagans) on the wrong?" Abu Bakr said, "O the son of Al-Khattab! He is Allah's Apostle, and Allah will never neglect him." Then Sura Al-Fath (The Victory) was revealed."
- Narrated 'Abdullah bin Mughaffal: I saw Allah's Apostle on the day of the Conquest of Mecca over his she-camel, reciting Surat-al-Fath in a vibrant quivering tone.
