= Treaty of al-Hudaybiya =

Treaty between Muhammad and the Quraysh in 628 CE

- Type: Peace Agreement
- Signed: March 628 CE (corresponding to Dhu'l-Qa'da 6 AH)
- Location: al-Hudaybiya, Hejaz
- Negotiators: Muhammad ibn Abdullah; Suhayl ibn Amr
- Parties: Muslims; Quraysh
- Language: Arabic

The Treaty of al-Hudaybiya (Arabic: صُلح الْحُدَيْبِيَة, romanized: Ṣulḥ al-Ḥudaybiya) was an agreement concluded in March 628 CE (Dhu'l-Qa'da 6 AH) between the Islamic prophet Muhammad, representing the state of Medina, and the Quraysh tribe of Mecca. It established a ten-year truce and permitted Muhammad and his followers to undertake a pilgrimage to Mecca the following year.

The treaty's provision concerning the return of emigrants were not applied by the Muslims to believing women who emigrated from Mecca to Medina, following the revelation of Quran 60:10.

The treaty reduced hostilities between Medina and Mecca. However, the treaty was effectively terminated after an attack by the Banu Bakr clan, an ally of the Quraysh, against Banu Khuza'ah, an ally of Muhammad, with support from members of Quraysh. The attack contributed to the Muslim conquest of Mecca in 630.

== Background ==
Following the rejection of Muhammad's message and the persecution of his followers, Muhammad migrated with his followers to Medina in 622. In Medina, he established a political base and gained additional followers. During the following years, armed conflicts took place between the Muslims and their Meccan opponents, who were led by the Quraysh tribe.

Mecca remained inaccessible to Muhammad's followers, including the Kaaba, which had been a pilgrimage centre since the pre-Islamic period. According to Islamic tradition, the obligation to perform pilgrimage to Mecca was established during the Medinan period. The direction of the prayer (qibla) had also changed from Jerusalem to Mecca in the second year of hijra, during Muhammad's time in Medina.

== Journey to Hudaybiya ==
In March 628, Muhammad set out for pilgrimage to Mecca after reportedly seeing a dream in which he was performing circumambulation of the Kaaba. He invited Bedouin and tribal groups around Medina to accompany him, although most declined, apparently because they anticipated hostilities.

Muhammad travelled with approximately 1,500 Muslims from Medina and allied tribal groups towards Mecca with the intention to perform the Umrah (lesser pilgrimage). (Note: Different accounts report between 700 and 1,900 pilgrims.) There are conflicting accounts as to whether the Muslims carried weapons. They travelled dressed as pilgrims and had sacrificial animals with them. The Meccans, presuming that it was an attack, dispatched a cavalry force to prevent their entry. However, Muhammad took an unconventional route and established a camp at Hudaybiya, on the outskirts of the sacred territory surrounding Kaaba.

== Negotiations ==
Representatives of the Quraysh met with Muhammad to negotiate. Muhammad stated that his objective was to perform the pilgrimage rather than engage in hostilities. The Quraysh nevertheless refused to allow the Muslims to enter Mecca that year, considering it weakness and a declaration of defeat to let him enter the city unconditionally. They are reported to have said: "Even if he has come not wanting to fight, by God, he shall never enter [the sanctuary] by force against our will, nor shall the Bedouin ever [have cause to] say that about us".

Muhammad sent Uthman to Mecca to negotiate on his behalf. A rumour subsequently circulated among the Muslims that Uthman had been killed. Muhammad and his followers vowed to avenge Uthman's rumoured death by a pledge to fight the Quraysh, an event known as the Pledge of the Tree (bay'at al-shajara). When the report of Uthman's death proved false, the Quraysh sent their emissary, Suhayl ibn Amr to negotiate a settlement with Muhammad. The two sides eventually agreed to resolve the dispute peacefully and drew up a treaty.

== Treaty content and signing ==
Diagram summarizing the terms of the Treaty of al-Hudaybiya.

The principal provisions of the agreements were:

- A truce would remain in effect between the two sides for ten years.
- A person from the Quraysh who fled to Muhammad without permission of their guardian would be returned to Quraysh, while a person who went from Muslims to the Quraysh would not be returned.
- Whoever wishes to enter into a covenant with Muhammad will be allowed to do so, and whoever wishes to enter into a covenant with the Quraysh will be allowed to do so.
- The Muslims would return to Medina without performing the pilgrimage that year but would be allowed the following year and would stay in Mecca for three days during which time the Quraysh will vacate the city. The Muslims will carry no weapons except sheathed swords during the pilgrimage.

The agreement was written by Ali. Muhammad instructed Ali to begin the document with the Basmala, "In the name of God, the Most Merciful, the Most Compassionate." Suhayl ibn Amr objected to this wording and demanded that the document instead begin with the customary phrase used by the Quraysh, "In your name, O God." When Ali wrote, "This is what Muhammad, the Messenger of God, has agreed with Suhayl ibn Amr." Suhayl objected to the description, stating that Quraysh did not recognize Muhammad's prophethood, and demanded that the document identify him simply as "Muhammad, son of Abdullah." Muhammad accepted the change in the wording in order to preserve the agreement. According to the traditional accounts, Ali was reluctant to erase the phrase "Messenger of God," so Muhammad instructed Ali to point where it appeared in the document, and erased it himself.

== Aftermath ==
Some of Muhammad's followers, including Umar, reportedly objected to the terms of the agreement. Muhammad subsequently instructed his followers to shave their head and sacrifice the animals to conclude the pilgrimage. Although they were initially reluctant, they followed his instruction. Surah al-Fath, the 48th chapter of the Quran was revealed while the Muslims were travelling back to Medina, which assured the Muslims that the expedition from which they were now returning must be considered a victorious one.

=== Return of emigrants ===
The treaty included a provision requiring the return of individuals who came to Medina from Mecca without the permission of their protectors. After the document was written, Suhayl's son Abu Jandal converted to Islam, arrived and sought to join Muhammad, but in accordance with the terms of the treaty, he was returned to his father.

=== Case of emigrant Muslim women ===
However, Muhammad did not apply this provision in the same manner to believing women who emigrated to Medina. According to the Islamic sources, when Umm Kulthum bint Uqba emigrated to Medina, her relatives sought her return. Muhammad refused, citing Qur'an 60:10, which instructed Muslims not to return women who were found to be believers.

Classical Muslim commentators differed on whether the verse constituted an exception to the treaty's return provision or clarified that women had not been included in it. According to historian W. Montgomery Watt, the Quraysh did not formally question Muhammad's conduct in this matter.

== Violation and aftermath ==
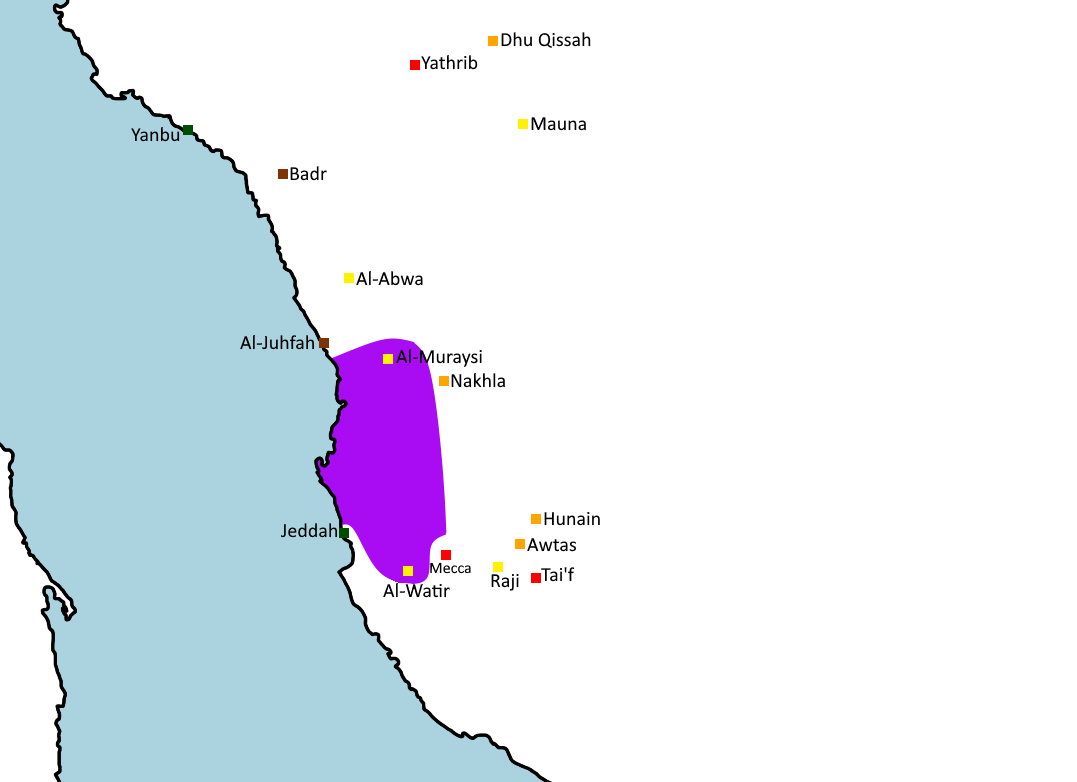
Map of the Khuzaa tribe (in purple), including the al-Watir well (Southwest of Mecca)

The treaty remained in effect for approximately two years. The Banu Bakr tribe, an ally of the Quraysh, attacked the Banu Khuza'ah, an ally of Muhammad, in an armed confrontation known as the Al-Watir Raid near a water spring and settlement known as al-Watir.

Some members of the Banu Khuza'ah fled and sought refuge in the sacred territory of Mecca, where fighting was traditionally prohibited. However, according to the accounts, some members of the Quraysh helped the Banu Bakr attack them. Several members of Banu Khuza'ah were killed, and Muhammad's followers considered the attack a violation of the treaty.

The Banu Khuza'ah subsequently sought Muhammad's assistance. Muhammad then sent a message to the Quraysh demanding that they address the violation. He offered them three alternatives: to pay blood money compensation for those killed from the Banu Khuza'ah, to end their alliance with the Banu Bakr, or to acknowledge that the Treaty of al-Hudaybiya was no longer in force. The Quraysh failed to reach an agreement with Muhammad.

Following the failure of the negotiations, Muhammad began preparing an expedition against Mecca.

=== Conquest of Mecca ===
In 630, Muhammad along with his followers marched toward Mecca with a large force drawn from Medina and allied tribes, and took control of Mecca. The conquest was relatively bloodless as the soldiers were given clear and decisive orders not to kill unless in self-defence, and to eliminate any aggressive elements and quell any opposition they may encounter. While ten individuals were initially excluded from the amnesty, although most of them were subsequently pardoned.

== Abu Basir and the Meccan caravans ==
Under the terms of the treaty, converts from mecca who fled to medina were returned to the Quraysh. Abu Basir, one of those returned, escaped while being taken back to Mecca and went to the coast. other converts later joined him, including Abu Jandal ibn Suhayl, and the group eventually numbered about 70 people. They formed a guerrilla group and began attacking Meccan caravans travelling to Syria. As the attacks disrupted their trade, the Meccans asked Muhammad to allow the group to settle in Medina. Muhammad accepted them.

== Historical assessment ==
The treaty has been regarded by historians as an important stage in the consolidation of Muhammad's position in Arabia. By signing the treaty, the Quraysh implicitly acknowledged Muhammad's position as a political equal. The agreement also gave Muhammad's followers access to the Kaaba for pilgrimage, which may have increased the appeal of his movement among tribes that regarded the sanctuary as significant.

The Muslim historian Ibn Hisham later wrote: "No previous victory in Islam was greater than this... when there was an armistice and war was abolished and men met in safety and consulted together none talked about Islam intelligently without entering it."

The truce also enabled Muhammad to expand his dominion elsewhere in Arabia without direct conflict with Mecca. The historian Fred Donner has suggested that the purpose of the Muhammad's attempted pilgrimage may have been to secure a truce with the Meccans, since Medina was trapped between two hostile cities, the Jewish stronghold of Khaybar to the north and Mecca to the south, leaving the Muslim community vulnerable. Muhammad therefore could not simply request a truce from the Quraysh, instead, Donner interprets the pilgrimage as a strategy through which a truce could be obtained. He nevertheless describes the decision as a risky undertaking that could have resulted in a serious setback had the Quraysh refused to negotiate.

Soon afterwards, Muhammad besieged and neutralized Khaybar. The treaty also allowed other tribes to choose whether to ally themselves with Muhammad or the Quraysh, and Muhammad subsequently gained the support of some tribes that had previously been allied with the Quraysh.

According to orientalist Montgomery Watt, the treaty helped remove restrictions affecting Median access to the Meccan trade routes to Syria and included concessions to the Quraysh. Watt interpreted these arrangements as part of an effort by Muhammad to improve relations with the Quraysh and encourage them to accept Islam.

== Sources ==
- Anthony, Sean (2020). Muhammad and the Empires of Faith: The Making of the Prophet of Islam. University of California Press. ISBN 9780520340411.
- Ali, Farrukh B. (1981). "Al-Ḥudaybiya: An Alternative Version". The Muslim World. 71 (1): 47–62. doi:10.1111/j.1478-1913.1981.tb03426.x.
- Donner, Fred M. (1979). "Muḥammad's Political Consolidation in Arabia up to the Conquest of Mecca: A Reassessment". The Muslim World. 69 (4): 229–247. doi:10.1111/j.1478-1913.1979.tb03388.x.
- Donner, Fred M. (2010). Muhammad and the Believers, at the Origins of Islam. Cambridge, MA: Harvard University Press. ISBN 978-0674050976.
- Fishbein, Michael, ed. (1997). The History of al-Ṭabarī, Volume VIII: The Victory of Islam: Muḥammad at Medina A.D. 626–630/A.H. 5–8. SUNY Series in Near Eastern Studies. Albany, New York: State University of New York Press. ISBN 978-0-7914-3149-8.
- Goerke, Andreas (2000). "The Historical Tradition about al-Ḥudaybiya: A Study of ʿUrwa B. al-Zubayr's Account". In Motzki, Harald (ed.). The Biography of Muḥammad: The Issue of the Sources. Leiden: Brill. pp. 240–275. ISBN 978-90-04-11513-2.
- Guillaume, Alfred (1998) [1955]. The Life of Muhammad: A Translation of Isḥāq's Sīrat Rasūl Allāh. Karachi: Oxford University Press. ISBN 0-19-636033-1.
- Hawting, Gerald R. (1986). "Al-Ḥudaybiyya and the Conquest of Mecca: A Reconsideration of the Tradition about the Muslim Takeover of the Sanctuary". Jerusalem Studies in Arabic and Islam. 8: 1–24.
- al-Tayib, Muhammad Sulayman (2020). موسوعة القبائل العربية [Encyclopedia of Arab tribes] (in Arabic).
- Watt, W. Montgomery (1956). Muhammad at Medina. London: Clarendon Press.
- Watt, W. Montgomery (1971). "Al-Ḥudaybiya". In Lewis, B.; Ménage, V. L.; Pellat, Ch. & Schacht, J. (eds.). The Encyclopaedia of Islam, Second Edition. Volume III: H–Iram. Leiden: E. J. Brill. p. 539. OCLC 495469525.
- Kennedy, Hugh (2016) [1986]. The Prophet and the Age of the Caliphates: The Islamic Near East from the 6th to the 11th Century (Third ed.). Abingdon, Oxon and New York: Routledge. ISBN 978-1-138-78761-2.
