= Conquest of Mecca =

Military campaign in early Muslim history, 629–630 CE

- Part of the Muslim–Quraysh War
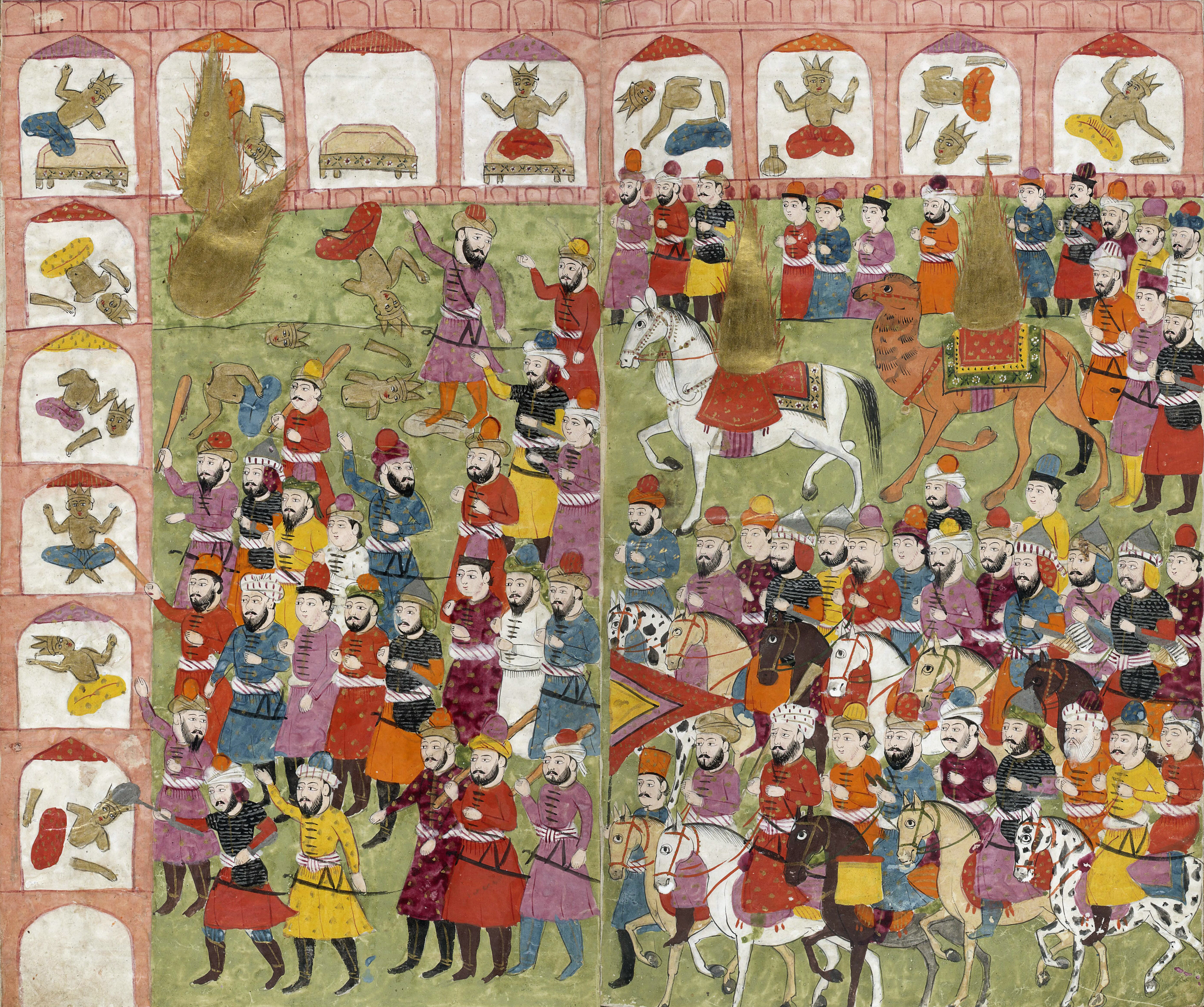
- Muhammad entering the Kaaba and destroying the Arabian idols (Bazil's Hamla-i Haydari, 1808)
Date	December 629 – January 630
Location	Mecca 21°25′21″N 39°49′24″E
Result	Muslim victory: End of Muslim–Quraysh War
Territorial changes	Muhammad's followers capture the city of Mecca

Belligerents
First Islamic state	Quraysh

Commanders and leaders
Muhammad; Abu Bakr; Umar; Abu Ubayda ibn al-Jarrah; Khalid ibn al-Walid; Zubayr ibn al-Awwam; Qays ibn Sa'd; Ali ibn Abi Talib	Abu Sufyan ibn Harb (surrendered); Suhayl ibn Amr (surrendered); Safwan ibn Umayya (surrendered); Ikrima ibn Amr (surrendered); Al-Harith ibn Hisham (surrendered); Hakim ibn Hizam (surrendered)

Strength
10,000	Unknown

Casualties and losses
2	13
- Location within present-day Saudi Arabia

The conquest of Mecca (Arabic: فتح مكة Fatḥ Makka) was a military campaign undertaken by Muhammad and his companions during the Muslim–Quraysh War. They led the early Muslims in an advance on the Quraysh-controlled city of Mecca in December 629 or January 630 (10–20 Ramadan, 8 AH). The fall of the city to Muhammad formally marked the end of the conflict between his followers and the Quraysh tribal confederation.

== Dates ==
Ancient sources vary as to the dates of these events.

- The date Muhammad set out for Mecca is variously given as 2, 6 or 10 Ramadan 8 AH.
- The date Muhammad entered Mecca is variously given as 10, 17/18, 19 or 20 Ramadan 8 AH.

The conversion of these dates to the Julian calendar depends on what assumptions are made about the calendar in use in Mecca at the time. For example, 18 Ramadan 8 AH may be converted to 11 December 629 AD, 10 or 11 January 630, or 6 June 630 AD.

== Background ==
In 628, the Quraysh tribe of Mecca and the Muslims in Medina entered into a 10-year pact called the Treaty of Hudaybiyyah. However, in 630 (8 A.H.), the Treaty of Hudaybiyyah was breached as a result of the aggression of the Banu Bakr, a confederate of the Quraysh, against the Banu Khuza'ah, who had recently entered into an alliance with the Muslims.

Pursuant to the Treaty of Hudaybiyyah, the Arab tribes were afforded the opportunity to align themselves with either the Muslims or the Quraysh. The agreement stipulated that in the event of any aggression against a tribe that had chosen a particular alliance, the party to which it was allied would possess the right to take retaliatory action. Consequently, the Banu Bakr aligned themselves with the Quraysh, while the Banu Khuza'ah aligned themselves with the Muslims. They had maintained peace for a period of time; however, underlying motives stemming from the pre-Islamic era, exacerbated by a persistent desire for revenge, ultimately led to renewed hostilities.

The Banu Bakr launched an attack against the Banu Khuza'ah at Al-Wateer in Sha'ban, 8 A.H., disregarding the terms of the treaty. A group of the Quraysh, headed by Safwan ibn Umayya, Ikrima ibn Amr, and Suhayl ibn Amr, provided the Banu Bakr with men and weapons under the cover of darkness, without the awareness of Abu Sufyan ibn Harb. Faced with aggression from their opponents, the members of the Banu Khuza'ah sought refuge in the Holy Sanctuary - the Kaaba. However, they were not spared and Nawfal, the leader of the Banu Bakr, killed twenty of them in violation of established customs. In response, the Banu Khuza'ah immediately dispatched a delegation to Medina to inform Muhammad of the breach of the truce and to request his assistance.

When the Banu Khuza'ah sought redress from their Muslim allies, Muhammad, in his capacity as their leader, insisted on immediate reparations for the violation of the treaty and the deaths of individuals allied with him in the sacred area. Three demands were presented, the acceptance of any one of which was imperative:

- Payment of blood money for the victims of the Banu Khuza'ah,
- the termination of their alliance with the Banu Bakr, or
- the nullification of the treaty.

This behaviour by the Quraysh was a clear breach of the Treaty of Hudaybiyyah and a hostile act against the Muslim allies, the Banu Khuza'ah. Realizing the gravity of the situation and the potential consequences, the Quraysh immediately called for an emergency meeting and elected to send their leader, Abu Sufyan ibn Harb, to Medina for the renegotiation of the treaty.

Following the incident, Abu Sufyan ibn Harb journeyed to Medina with the intention of renegotiating the Truce. He made a direct visit to the residence of his daughter Umm Habiba, who was also the wife of Muhammad. Upon entering the house, Abu Sufyan attempted to take a seat on the carpet of Muhammad. However, his daughter, Umm Habiba, promptly folded it. "My daughter," Abu Sufyan stated, "I hardly knew if you think the carpet is too good for me or that I am too good for the carpet." Umm Habiba responded, "It is the Messenger of Allah's carpet, and you are an unclean polytheist."

Abu Sufyan ibn Harb sought an audience with Muhammad. However, the latter was aware of his tricks and did not provide him with any assurance. He then approached Abu Bakr but was similarly rebuffed. He attempted to solicit the intervention of 'Umar but was met with a flat refusal. Finally, he turned to Ali ibn Abi Talib, pleading with him in the humblest manner and subtly hinting at the potential for domination over all the Arabs if he were to intercede for the renewal of the treaty. However, 'Ali also expressed his inability to assist him.

Schematic Diagram

Abu Sufyan ibn Harb returned to Mecca in a state of disappointment and despair. He reported his encounters with his daughter, Abu Bakr, 'Umar, and 'Ali, as well as Muhammad's lack of response to his pleas, to the Quraysh. The Quraysh were disheartened but did not anticipate immediate danger.

== Preparations ==
=== Muhammad implements a communications blackout ===
According to Al-Tabari, three days prior to receiving news of a breach of covenant, Muhammad instructed his wife, 'Aisha, to make preparations for a military campaign. Abu Bakr ('Aisha's father), expressing surprise at the preparations, asked her for an explanation, to which she replied that she was unaware of the reason. On the third day, 'Amr ibn Salim Al-Khuza'i arrived in Medina with a group of 40 horsemen to inform Muhammad of the plight of his people and to seek assistance from the Muslims for retaliation. The people of Medina soon learned that the Quraysh had breached the covenant. This news was later confirmed by the arrival of Budail and Abu Sufyan ibn Harb.

With the aim of ensuring a total news blackout regarding his military plans, Muhammad dispatched a small unit of eight individuals, led by Abu Qatada al-Ansari, towards the vicinity of Edam, close to Medina, with the intent of diverting the people's attention and obscuring the true objective of his focus. There was so much fear everywhere that Hatib, a trusted follower of Muhammad, secretly sent a female messenger to Mecca with a letter that contained information of the intended attack by the Muslims. Muhammad is believed to have received news of Hatib's actions through revelation and sent Ali and Al-Miqdad with instructions to catch up with the messenger. They succeeded in overtaking her and discovered the letter that was carefully hidden in her hair. Muhammad summoned Hatib and asked him why he had done such an act. Hatib replied:

"O Messenger of Allah! I have no blood ties with Quraysh; there is only a kind of friendly relationship between them and myself. My family is in Mecca and there is no one to look after them or offer protection. My situation is different from that of the refugees whose families are secure due to their blood ties with Quraysh. I felt that since I am not related to them, I should, for the safety of my children, earn their gratitude by doing good to them. I swear by Allah that I have not done this act as an apostate, forsaking Islam. I was prompted only by the considerations I have just explained."

Umar, upon hearing of Hatib's actions, wanted to execute him for being a hypocrite, but Muhammad accepted Hatib's explanation and granted him pardon. Muhammad then addressed Umar saying, "Hatib is one of those who fought in the battle of Badr. What do you know 'Umar? Perhaps Allah has looked at the people of Badr and said: "Do as you please, for I have forgiven you." Umar released Hatib and acknowledged that "Allah and His Messenger know better."

=== Muslim army mobilizes for Mecca campaign ===
Muhammad would summon all Muslims capable of combat and began to march to Mecca in response to the violation of the Treaty of al-Hudaybiya and a fruitless embassy.

As they progressed towards Mecca, Abbas ibn Abd al-Muttalib and his family joined Muhammad and his army at a place called Al-Juhfa. Upon reaching Al-Abwa’, the Muslims encountered Abu Sufyan ibn al-Harith (not to be confused with the previously mentioned Abu Sufyan ibn Harb) and ‘Abdullah ibn Umayyah, who were the cousins of Muhammad. However, due to their previous actions and negative attitude towards the Muslims, they were not received with open arms. 'Ali advised Abu Sufyan to seek forgiveness from Muhammad and confess his past misconduct in a manner similar to the repentance of the prophet Joseph's brothers in the Qur'an:

"They said, "By Allah, certainly has Allah preferred you over us, and indeed, we have been sinners." (Qur'an 12:91)

Abu Sufyan followed this advice and approached Muhammad, who forgave Abu Sufyan and quoted from the Qur'an:

"He said, "No blame will there be upon you today. Allah will forgive you; and He is the most merciful of the merciful." (Qur'an 12:92)

Abu Sufyan then recited some verses (of poetry) in praise of Muhammad and professed Islam as his only religion.

The Muslims continued their journey towards Mecca while observing the fast, until they reached a location called Al-Qadeed where they found water and broke their fast. They then continued their march towards Mar Az-Zahran. The Quraysh did not have knowledge of the developments, but Muhammad did not wish to take them by surprise. He instructed his men to light fires on all sides for cooking purposes. This was done to allow the Quraysh to accurately assess the situation and make informed decisions, rather than risking their lives by blindly entering into the battlefield without proper knowledge. 'Umar ibn Al-Khattab was assigned the responsibility of guarding their camp.

=== Abu Sufyan ibn Harb converts to Islam ===
Meanwhile, Abu Sufyan ibn Harb, Hakim ibn Hizam, and Budayl ibn Warqa', ventured out to gather information about the Muslims' position. On their way, they encountered Abbas ibn Abd al-Muttalib, Muhammad's uncle, who provided them with information about the current situation and urged them to consider accepting Islam and surrendering to Muhammad, warning that failure to do so would result in severe consequences.

Faced with the dire circumstances, Abu Sufyan ibn Harb, in the company of Abbas ibn Abd al-Muttalib, sought an audience with Muhammad. Upon their arrival, the Muslims were furious at the sight of Abu Sufyan and sought to kill him. However, with the help of 'Abbas, the two men were able to secure an audience with Muhammad, who advised that they return the following day. During this meeting, Muhammad addressed Abu Sufyan, saying: "Woe to you! Isn’t it time for you to bear witness to the Oneness of Allah and Prophethood of Muhammad?" In response, Abu Sufyan, who was previously an archenemy of Islam, begged for forgiveness and professed his wholehearted acceptance of the faith. Muhammad, in accordance with the general amnesty he had proclaimed, granted Abu Sufyan a special privilege at the request of 'Abbas. Muhammad stated, "He who takes refuge in Abu Sufyan’s house is safe; whosoever confines himself to his house, the inmates thereof shall be in safety, and he who enters the Sacred Mosque is safe."

=== Muslim army advances on Mecca ===
On the morning of Tuesday, 17th Ramadan, 8 A.H., Muhammad set out from Mar Az-Zahran and ordered 'Abbas to detain Abu Sufyan ibn Harb at a location that offered a clear view of the Muslim army's march towards Mecca. This was done so that Abu Sufyan could witness the strength and power of the Muslim soldiers. As the different tribes of the Muslim army passed by, each with their banners unfurled, Abu Sufyan marveled at their strength and power. Eventually, the battalion of the Muhajirun (Muslims from Mecca) and Ansar (Muslims from Medina), with Muhammad at their head, heavily armed, marched by. Abu Sufyan began to wonder who those people were, to which 'Abbas told him that they were Muhammad and his Companions. Abu Sufyan said that no army, however powerful, could resist those people and addressing 'Abbas, he said: "I swear by Allah that the sovereignty of your brother's son has become too powerful to withstand." 'Abbas responded, "It is rather the power of Prophethood," with which the former agreed.

Saʽd ibn ʽUbadah carried the flag of the Ansar. When he passed by Abu Sufyan ibn Harb, he taunted him, saying "Today will witness the great fight, you cannot seek sanctuary at Al-Ka'bah. Today will witness the humiliation of Quraysh." Abu Sufyan expressed his dismay to Muhammad, who became angry and rebuked Sa'd, stating "Nay, today Al-Ka'bah will be sanctified, and Quraysh honoured." He immediately ordered that Sa'd be stripped off the flag and that it should be given to his son Qays, in another version, Az-Zubair.

=== Quraysh fighters prepare for the Muslim advance ===
'Abbas urged Abu Sufyan ibn Harb to hasten into Mecca and warn the Quraysh against any aggressive behaviour towards the Muslims. Abu Sufyan, who was now an ally of the Muslims, shouted at the top of his voice and advised the Quraysh to seek safety in his house. The people of Mecca laughed at him and dispersed in different directions, some taking refuge in their homes, others entering the Kaaba (holy sanctuary), while some individuals led by Ikrima ibn Amr, Safwan ibn Umayya, and Suhayl ibn Amr, encamped themselves in a place called Khandamah with the intention of causing harm to the Muslims.

== Entry into Mecca ==
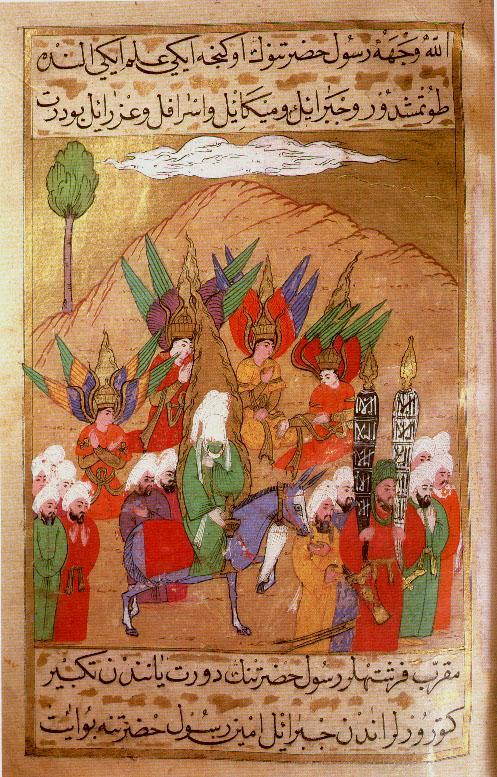
Muslims enter Mecca with angels in Siyer-i Nebi

Muhammad made final preparations for the military breakthrough into Mecca. He appointed Khalid ibn al-Walid as the leader of the right flank of the army with the Aslam, Sulaym, Ghifar, Muzainah, and Juhaynah tribes under his command to enter Mecca through its lower avenues. Zubayr ibn al-Awwam was appointed to lead the left flank and storm Mecca from the upper side. Abu 'Ubaidah was given command of the infantry and was ordered to penetrate the city through a side valley. The soldiers were given clear and decisive orders not to kill unless in self-defense, and to eliminate any aggressive elements and quell any opposition they may encounter.

The Muslim battalions executed their assigned missions with precision and success. Khalid ibn al-Walid effectively infiltrated the city, engaging in combat, resulting in the deaths of twelve enemy combatants and the martyrdom of two of his own men. Zubayr ibn al-Awwam reached his designated destination, where he planted the banner at the Al-Fath (conquest) Mosque and waited there for the arrival of Muhammad. A tent was set up for him, where he offered prayers of gratitude to Allah for the victory.

== Aftermath ==
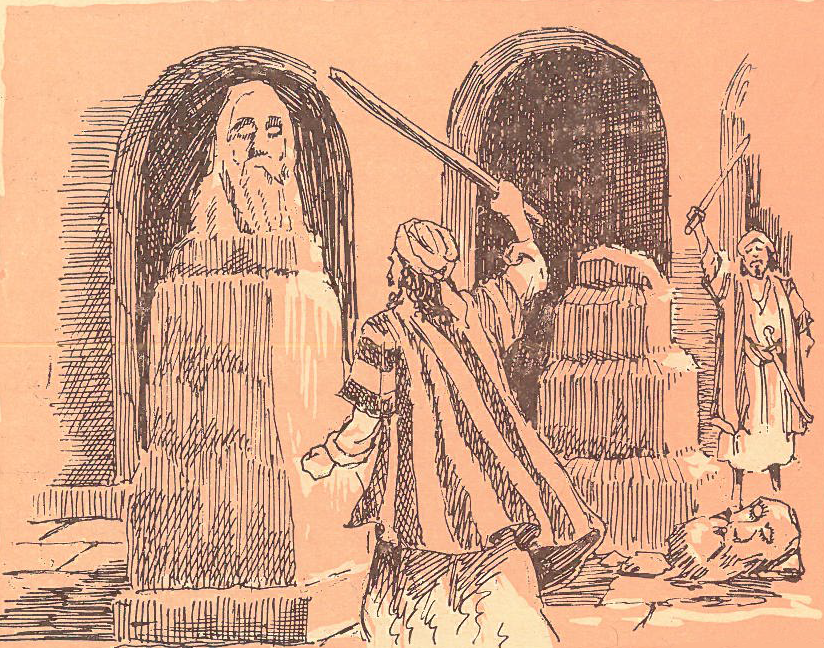
Muslims break idols

=== Muhammad enters the Kaaba and destroys the Arabian idols ===
Muhammad did not rest for long and, accompanied by the Ansar and Muhajirun, made his way towards the Kaaba which is seen as a symbol of the Oneness of Allah. It was filled with idols, numbering 360. He proceeded to knock them down using his bow while reciting the verse from the Qur'an:

"And say: 'The truth has come, and falsehood has vanished away; surely falsehood is ever certain to vanish." (Qur'an 17:81)

This act was significant as it symbolized the removal of polytheistic practices and the claiming of the Kaaba for the worship of Allah alone, in line with the teachings of Islam. This event is considered a major milestone in the establishment of the Islamic faith and the spread of monotheism.

Muhammad began the usual circumambulation on his ride, and after completing the circumambulation, he called for 'Uthman ibn Talha, the key holder of the Kaaba, and took the key from him. He entered the Kaaba and observed images of the prophets Abraham and Ishmael, throwing divination arrows. He strongly denounced these practices of the Quraysh and ordered that all idols, images and effigies be destroyed.

=== Muhammad prays in the Kaaba and addresses the Quraysh ===
Muhammad then entered the sacred hall, facing the wall opposite the door and performed devout prostrations, and went around acclaiming the Greatness and Oneness of Allah. Shortly afterwards, he returned to the doorway, standing on its elevated step, gazed in thankfulness at the thronging multitude below and delivered a celebrated address: "There is no god but Allah Alone. He has no associates. He made good His Promise that He held to His slave and helped him and defeated all the Confederates alone. Bear in mind that every claim of privilege, whether that of blood, or property, is under my heel, except that of the custody of Al-Ka'bah and supplying of water to the pilgrims. Bear in mind that for anyone who is slain, even though semi-deliberately, with club or whip, for him the blood-money is very severe: a hundred camels, forty of them to be pregnant."

"O people of Quraish! surely Allah has abolished from you all pride of the pre-Islamic era and all conceit in your ancestry, (because) all men are descended from Adam, and Adam was made out of clay." He then recited to them the verse from the Qur'an: "O mankind, indeed, We have created you from male and female and made you peoples and tribes that you may know one another. Indeed, the most noble of you in the sight of Allah is the most righteous of you. Indeed, Allah is Knowing and Acquainted." (Qur'an 49:13) He further added: "O you people of Quraysh! What do you think of the treatment that I am about to accord to you?" They replied: "O noble brother and son of noble brother! We expect nothing but goodness from you." Upon this he said: "I speak to you in the same words as Yusuf (the prophet Joseph) spoke unto his brothers: He said: "No reproach on you this day," (Qur'an 12:92) "go your way, for you are freed ones." Muhammad designated 'Uthman ibn Talha as the custodian of the Kaaba and tasked him with the responsibility of providing water to pilgrims. It was decreed that the keys to the Kaaba would remain in the possession of 'Uthman and his descendants permanently.

=== Bilal ibn Rabah recites the call to prayer at the Kaaba ===
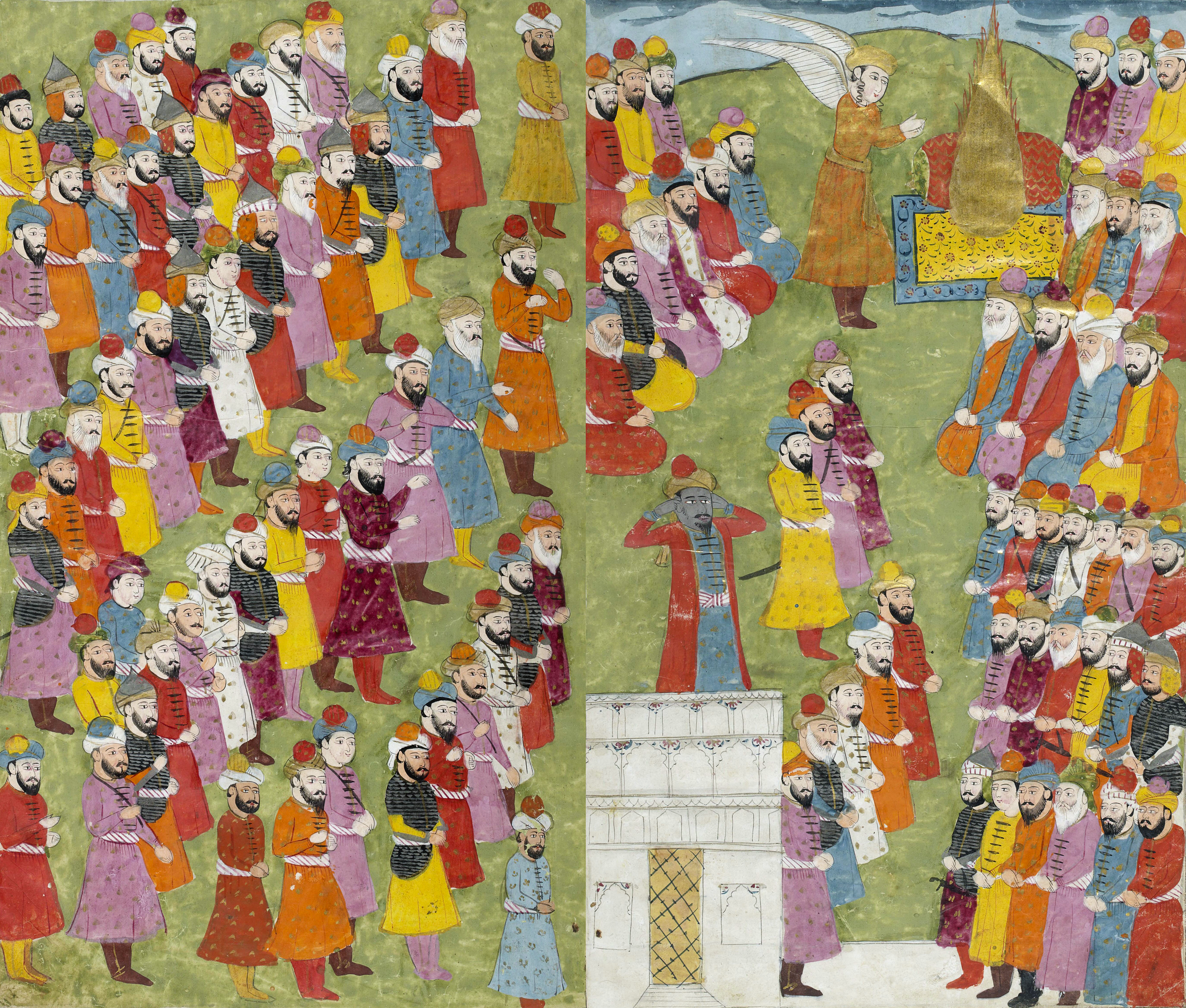
Islamic miniature depicting Jibril (Archangel Gabriel) providing instructions on how to perform the call to prayer to Muhammad (golden flame) as well as Bilal al-Habashi, the first muezzin calling the Muslims to prayer from atop the Kaaba.

As the time for prayer approached, Bilal ibn Rabah ascended the Kaaba and called the adhan – the Islamic call to prayer. Abu Sufyan ibn Harb, 'Itab ibn Usaid, and Al-Harith ibn Hisham were present in the courtyard at the time. 'Itab commented on the novel situation, remarking that Allah had honoured his father, Usaid, by not allowing him to hear such words. Muhammad, said to have been guided by Divine revelation, approached the group and informed them that he had learned of their conversation. Al-Harith and 'Itab, taken aback by this, immediately professed their belief in Islam.

On that same day, Muhammad visited the home of 'Umm Hani, where he washed and offered prayers of victory. 'Umm Hani had provided shelter to two of her Meccan relatives in her home, an action which was supported by Muhammad.

=== Muslims punish Quraysh stragglers ===
It was decreed that the shedding of the blood of nine arch-criminals was lawful, even "under the curtains" of the Kaaba. However, only four of them were ultimately killed, while the others were pardoned for various reasons. One of the individuals killed was 'Abdullah ibn Khatal, who had initially accepted Islam and was appointed to collect alms-tax (zakat) in the company of an Ansar. During a dispute, 'Abdullah killed the Ansar's slave and subsequently apostatized, joining the pagan Arabs. He remained unrepentant for this crime and even hired two women singers to sing satirical songs about Muhammad.

Another individual who was executed was Miqyas ibn Sababa, who was a Muslim. An Ansar had accidentally killed his brother Hisham, and Muhammad had arranged for the payment of blood money to him, which he had accepted. However, Miqyas killed the Ansar and subsequently apostatized, going to Mecca. Similarly, Huwairith and one woman singer were also put to death for their crimes.

In contrast, Ikrima ibn Amr, who had attacked Khalid ibn al-Walid's detachment during the entry into Mecca, was forgiven. Wahshi, the murderer of Hamza ibn Abd al-Muttalib, Muhammad's uncle, and Hind bint Utba, who had mutilated his body, were also extended clemency. Habar, who had attacked Muhammad's daughter with a spear while she was on her way from Mecca to Medina, causing fatal injuries that ultimately led to her death, was also forgiven.

Two chiefs of the Quraysh were pardoned once they had embraced Islam. They were Safwan ibn Umayya and Fudalah ibn 'Umair. The latter had previously attempted to assassinate Muhammad while he was circumambulating the Kaaba.

=== Muhammad addresses the Meccans on the city's new status ===
On the second day of conquest, Muhammad addressed the people and discussed the holy status of Mecca. He began by praising Allah and proclaimed that Mecca was a holy land and would remain so until the Day of Judgement. He emphasized that no bloodshed was allowed within Mecca and reminded the people that the temporary license granted to him for the conquest did not apply to others. According to a narration by Ibn Abbas, Muhammad said, "Allah has made Mecca a sanctuary, so it was a sanctuary before me and will continue to be a sanctuary after me. It was made legal for me (i.e. I was allowed to fight in it) for a few hours of a day. It is not allowed to uproot its shrubs or to cut its trees, or to chase (or disturb) its game, or to pick up its fallen things except by a person who would announce that (what has found) publicly." Abbas asked for an exception to be made for lemon grass, as it was used by goldsmiths and for household purposes, to which Muhammad agreed.

Muhammad was deeply angered upon learning of the tribal retaliation committed by the Khuza'ah tribe, in which a member of the Laith tribe was killed. He swiftly issued a directive for the Khuza'ah to cease any further engagement in "pre-Islamic practices" of revenge. Additionally, he granted the family of the victim the right to choose between two options for redress: the payment of blood-money or the pursuit of just retribution through the death of the perpetrator.

=== Medinans express concern that Muhammad might stay in Mecca ===
After delivering his address, Muhammad proceeded to a small hill called Safa, located near the Kaaba. Facing the Kaaba and surrounded by a large and devoted crowd, he raised his hand in prayer to Allah. The citizens of Medina who had gathered around him expressed their fear that, having achieved victory over his native city, he might choose to reside there permanently. He acknowledged their concerns and reassured them that he had lived among them and would continue to do so until his death. He emphasized that he had no intention of leaving them.

=== Meccans pledge allegiance to Muhammad ===
Following the conquest, many of its inhabitants came to accept Islam and pledged their allegiance to Muhammad. Men came first, pledging full obedience in all areas, followed by the women. Muhammad, with Umar ibn Al-Khattab acting as his representative, accepted their allegiance on the condition that they would not associate any other deity with Allah and that they would not engage in theft. Hind bint Utba, the wife of Abu Sufyan ibn Harb, came disguised, fearing recognition by Muhammad for her past actions, including her role in the death of his uncle Hamza ibn Abd al-Muttalib. When asked if they agreed to refrain from theft, Hind complained that her husband, Abu Sufyan, was tight-fisted. Her husband interrupted granting all his worldly possessions to her. Muhammad laughed and recognised the woman. She implored him for forgiveness. Additional conditions, such as the prohibition of adultery, infanticide, and bearing false witness, were also imposed. Hind swore that she would not have come to pledge her allegiance if she had any intention of disobeying him. Upon returning home, she destroyed her idols and acknowledged her previous misconceptions about stone gods.

Muhammad stayed in Mecca for nineteen days during which he focused on educating people about the principles of Islam. He instructed Abu Usaid Al-Khuza‘i to restore the pillars of the Holy Sanctuary, sent envoys to various regions inviting people to accept Islam, and ordered the destruction of all remaining idols in the vicinity of Mecca, saying:

"Whoever believes in Allah and the Hereafter is supposed to scrap out the idols that should happen to be in his house."

=== Muhammad's army destroys pre-Islamic influences in Mecca ===
Following the conquest, Muhammad immediately set out to remove any remaining traces of pre-Islamic practices by dispatching troops and delegations to eliminate symbols associated with those practices:

1. In Ramadan 8 A.H., Muhammad sent Khalid ibn al-Walid to a location known as Nakhlah, where a goddess named Al-Uzza was worshiped by the Quraysh and Kinana tribes and was guarded by custodians from Bani Shaiba. Khalid, leading thirty horsemen, arrived at the location and destroyed it. Upon returning, Muhammad asked if he had seen anything there, to which Khalid replied negatively. He then instructed Khalid to go back and complete the task. Khalid returned to the location, where he saw an Abyssinian woman, naked and with dishevelled hair. He struck her with his sword, cutting her in two. He then returned and related the story to Muhammad, who confirmed that the task had been completed.
2. Later in the same month, Muhammad sent 'Amr ibn al-As to destroy another idol, known as Suwa‘, which was venerated by the Hudhayl tribe and was located three kilometres away from Mecca. When 'Amr was questioned by the custodian of the idol, he stated that he had been ordered by Muhammad to destroy it. The custodian warned 'Amr that he would not be able to do it. Nevertheless, 'Amr was able to destroy the idol, and upon breaking open a nearby casket, found nothing inside. The custodian immediately accepted Islam.
3. In the same month, Muhammad also sent Sa'd ibn Zayd Al-Ashhali on a similar mission to Al-Mashallal, to destroy an idol named Manat, which was worshiped by both, the Al-Aws and Al-Khazraj tribes. Upon arriving at the location, Sa'd encountered another Abyssinian woman, naked and with dishevelled hair, who was wailing and beating her chest. He immediately killed her, destroyed the idol, and broke open a nearby casket, but found nothing inside. He then returned to report the completion of his mission.
4. In 8 A.H., Muhammad sent Khalid ibn al-Walid, leading 350 horsemen of Ansar, Muhajirun, and Bani Saleem, to the settlement of the Bani Khuzaimah bedouins to invite them to Islam. He instructed Khalid to carry out his mission peacefully. However, the people there were not articulate enough to communicate their intentions, so Khalid ordered his men to kill them and take the others as captives. He even considered killing the captives, but some of the companions of the Prophet opposed his plan. News of the bloodshed reached Muhammad, who was deeply saddened and raised his hands, saying: "O Allah! I am innocent of what Khalid has done," twice. He sent Ali to make reparations to the tribes that were wronged, and 'Ali paid blood money to those who suffered losses and distributed the remaining portion among the members of the tribe to alleviate their suffering. Muhammad also became angry with Khalid for his irrational behaviour and his altercation with Abd al-Rahman ibn Awf, and ordered Khalid to stop the argument, reminding him that his companions were of too high a rank to be involved in such conflicts. Then, Muhammad asked Khalid why he acted that way. Khalid replied that he was merely responding to those who spoke against him. Muhammad then said, "Do not harm Khalid, for he is a sword of Allah, unsheathed against the disbelievers."

== In popular culture ==
Movies:

- The Message (1976)
- Muhammad: The Last Prophet (2002)

Shows:

- Omar (2012)

== See also ==
- Military career of Muhammad
  - Muslim–Quraysh War
  - Muhammad's expeditions
- Muhammad in Mecca
- Muhammad in Medina
- Al-Rayah Mosque

== Notes ==
Variation in dates given in ancient sources
Primary source	Date of departure for Mecca	Date of entry into Mecca	Citation
Ibrahim		10 Ramadan 8 AH	
Abu Sa'id al-Khudri	2 Ramadan 8 AH	17/18 Ramadan 8 AH	
Al-Hakam	6 Ramadan 8 AH		
ibn 'Abbas, Tabari	10 Ramadan 8 AH		
ibn Ishaq		20 Ramadan 8 AH	
Waqidi	Wednesday 10 Ramadan 8 AH		
ibd Sad	Wednesday 10 Ramadan 8 AH	Friday 19 Ramadan 8 AH	
