= Muslim–Quraysh War =

Religious conflict in the early Islamic period

- Part of the early Muslim–Meccan conflict
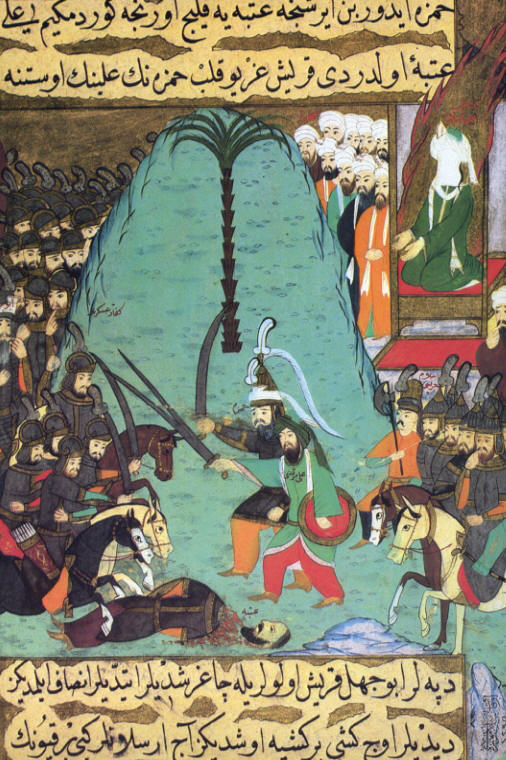
- Scene from Siyer-i Nebi, Hamza and Ali leading the Muslim armies at Badr. The writing is Ottoman Naskh.
Date	March 13, 624 – December 629 or January 630 (17 Ramadan 2 AH – 10 to 20 Ramadan 8 AH)
Location	Hejaz, Arabia
Result	Muslim victory
Territorial changes	Mecca captured by the Muslims

Belligerents
First Islamic state: Quraysh splinter groups; Ansars; Muhajirun; Banu Makhzum (from 627); Trench: Banu Khazraj; Banu Aws; Hudaybiyyah co-signatories: Banu Khuza'ah	Quraysh: Mushrikites; Banu Makhzum (624–627); Banu Abd-Shams; Banu Umayya; Banu Jumah; Trench: Qays Aylan; Ghatafan; Banu Asad; Banu Sulaym; Banu Murra; Banu Shuja; others; Support: Banu Nadir; Hudaybiyyah co-signatories: Banu Bakr

Commanders and leaders
Muhammad (WIA); Abu Bakr (WIA); Umar ibn al-Khattab (WIA); Ali (WIA); Uthman ibn Affan; Hamza ibn Abd al-Muttalib †; Mus'ab ibn Umayr †; Zubayr ibn al-Awwam; Abu Ubayda ibn al-Jarrah; Talha ibn Ubayd Allah (WIA); Salman the Persian; Sa'd ibn Abi Waqqas; Khalid ibn al-Walid (Note: Defected to the side of the Muslims in 627, and served until the end of the war in 630.)	Amr ibn Hisham †; Abu Sufyan (surrendered); Khalid ibn al-Walid (Note: Fought on the side of the Quraysh from 624 to 627.); Ikrima ibn Amr (surrendered); Suhayl ibn Amr (surrendered); Hind bint Utba (surrendered); Utba ibn Rabi'a †; Shayba ibn Rabi'a †; Uqba ibn Abi Mu'ayt †; Nadr ibn al-Harith (executed); Al-Walid ibn Utba †; Umayyah ibn Khalaf †; Safwan ibn Umayya (surrendered)

Strength
Badr: 313; Uhud: 1,000; The Trench: 3,000; Mecca: 10,000	Badr: 600 (Watt’s estimate)–1,000 (Islamic sources); Uhud: 3,200; The Trench: 10,000

Casualties and losses
83–97 killed	108–121 killed ~70 captured

The Muslim–Quraysh War (Arabic: الحرب الإسلامية-القرشية) was a 6-year military and religious conflict in the Arabian Peninsula between the early Muslims led by Muhammad on one side and the Arab pagan Quraysh tribe on the other. The war started in March 624 with the Battle of Badr, and concluded with the Conquest of Mecca.

Muhammad, born in Mecca, began spreading Islam in the city at the age of 40. Initially, he met no opposition from the Meccans, who were indifferent to his activities until he attacked their beliefs. As tensions arose, Muhammad brought his followers to migrate to Medina after successful negotiations with the Banu Aws and Khazraj to mediate their tribal conflicts.

During his stay in Medina, Muhammad began conducting frequent raids on Quraysh trade caravans and plundering their goods. A short while after he had earned rich loot after a successful raid by his troops on a caravan at Nakhla, Muhammad got word of a huge Quraysh caravan carrying abundant merchandise on its way back from the Gaza City. He thus sent his troops to intercept it at Badr. Getting wind of his plan, Abu Sufyan, who led the caravan, sent messengers to Mecca for help. The reinforcements then encamped near Badr out of sight of the Muslims, and the caravan was directed to another, more difficult route. After the caravan escaped, some of the Quraysh chose to withdraw, but those who remained were later forced into conflict with Muhammad after he captured their water carrier and covered up the water wells with sand, which left one only for him and his troops. The Quraysh were defeated in this battle.

The Battle of Badr was followed by a Stalemate, in the Battle of Uhud, which took place in March 625. Two years later, a confederation of different Arab tribes, led by the Meccans, besieged Medina. That attempt at conquering Medina was thwarted, however, by a trench built by the Muslims at the suggestion of Salman the Persian. Soon, Muhammad managed to eliminate the last major Jewish tribe in Medina, the Banu Qurayza, which cemented his position in the city.

After a period of not making attacks on Quraysh caravans and instead focusing his raids to the north, such as to the Banu Lahyan and Mustaliq, among others, the attitude of Muhammad's tribesmen toward him grew more favourable. A ten-year armistice, known as the Treaty of Hudaybiyyah, was then concluded, which allowed Muhammad to return to perform Umrah in Mecca. There, Muhammad successfully reconciliated with his family, the Banu Hashim, and a number of notables admitted him as a man of the future in Arabia and converted to Islam. Sometime later, a belligerent party in Mecca supported one of its client tribes against the Banu Khuza'ah, who were allies of Muhammad, in violation of the treaty. When Muhammad brought his army to Mecca, Abu Sufyan and a few others approached Muhammad to ask for amnesty for those who abandoned armed resistance. Muhammad then managed to enter Mecca unopposed, and most of the population converted to Islam.

Muhammad died just two years after that. The war holds high importance and significance in the history of Islam and forms a major part of Muhammad's biography (Seerah or Seerat un-Nabi). The war also paved the way for the Early Islamic expansion throughout the Arabian Peninsula and beyond.

== Background ==
=== Rise of Islam and Hijrah ===
Muhammad proclaimed prophethood (nubuwwah) at the age of 40 to his tribe, the Quraysh, in Mecca. After his followers were persecuted by the Quraysh, Muhammad ordered them to move to Abyssinia to seek refuge in 615, where they were welcomed with open arms. After the death of his uncle Abu Talib in 619, Muhammad, the prophet of Islam, was lacking someone who provided him security in an increasingly hostile environment in Mecca. After several failed attempts to reach for tribes outside of Mecca, he contacted the Khazraj of Medina (then Yathrib). Six of them converted to Islam.

In Medina, they spread the word of Muhammad and Islam and in February 621, a new delegation reached Mecca, among them were two members of the community of Banu Aws. The Khazraj and Aws were rivals at this time, fighting for control of Medina. Muhammad mediated a ceasefire between the two parties and sent them back to Medina, accompanied by a reciter of the Quran. Islam slowly grew in Medina before in March 622, a new delegation, this time numbering 72 people, consulted with Muhammad. They pledged their readiness to wage war against Muhammad's enemies. The Meccans, who heard rumours of this meeting and realized that this was a call to war, failed an attempt to assassinate Muhammad in May 622.

After being threatened with murder by the Quraysh, Muhammad received pledges of protection from the Ansar of Yathrib. He then allowed his followers to emigrate to the city, before leaving for Yathrib in 622 himself. Following his migration, Muhammad took to intercepting the caravans of the Quraysh as a means of retaliation and compensation for the wealth lost by his Meccan companions. Muhammad fled, together with his companion Abu Bakr, to Medina, in what is known as the Hijrah.

=== Caravan raids prior to Badr ===
Muhammad and his companions soon engaged in a series of caravan raids. These raids were generally offensive and carried out to gather intelligence or seize the trade goods of caravans financed by the Quraysh (such retaliation was explained as being legitimate by saying many Muslims' possessions and wealth, left behind when they migrated from Mecca, were stolen). The Muslims declared that the raids were justified and that God gave them permission to defend against the Meccans' persecution of Muslims. Another reason for the raids appears to have been economic stress, as the food output of Medina was barely capable of feeding the Muslim newcomers. Hence, the raiding of food was mandatory to supplement their diet.

The order of the caravan raids is somewhat confused in the Islamic sources. What seems clear is that there were two types of raids: those led by Muhammad and those led by lieutenants. They featured somewhere between seven and 200 warriors, typically on foot, but occasionally horse riders. These fighters were, at least initially, provided almost exclusively by the Muhajirun, the Muslim migrants from Mecca. Consisting primarily of unemployed young men, they had the chance to place their name in a register if desiring to go on a raid.

The first year of these raids was a "near total failure". All Meccan caravans managed to evade Muhammad's forces or were accompanied by forces with superior numbers, suggesting that the Quraish relied on a spy among the core of the Muslim community. Aware of this problem, Muhammad introduced the usage of sealed letters of instructions and appointed 'Abdullah ibn Jahsh to lead an expedition of eight or twelve men. After marching for two days, Ibn Jahsh opened the letter to learn that, according to most sources, he was instructed to gain intelligence information about the movement of Meccan caravans deep in Quraish territory, in Nakhlah, near modern-day Rabigh. Soon the expedition met a Meccan caravan, weakly protected by only four guards. The Muslims encountered the caravan in a holy month where fighting was forbidden, and it also seems that Muhammad did not order the usage of violence. Despite this, the Muslim warriors collectively decided to attack and approached the caravan disguised as pilgrims. When close enough they leaped upon the guards: one of whom escaped, two were seized and one was killed. The victim, named Amr ibn al-Hadrami, was the first person killed for the cause of Islam. Ibn Jahsh and his men returned to Medina with the seized caravan, which carried wine, leather goods and raisins.

== Battle of Badr ==
In March 624, Muhammad was given news of a caravan of the Quraysh travelling from the Levant back to Makkah, led by Abu Sufyan ibn Harb. It was of monumental size, comprising 1000 camels transporting tens of thousands of dinars, and was escorted by 70 horsemen. Attacking this caravan would have forced Mecca into action, as virtually every family of the Quraysh had invested in it. Despite this risk, Muhammad began the preparations before finally setting out on 9 December 623, with a force of around 313-317 men, 70 camels and two horses. Muhammad and his warriors marched offside the common roads to avoid Meccan scouts, passing through little-known canyons and wadis. Abu Sufyan, realized that Muslim scouts were nearby and ordered the caravan to take a different route, sending a messenger to Mecca. After the messenger arrived in Mecca and told the Quraysh that a Muslim attack was imminent, a Meccan relief force of more than 1,000 men was sent. 'Amr ibn Hisham, who led the relief army, pressed northwards to Badr. As the army camped at Al Juhfah (present-day Rabigh), another messenger from Abu Sufyan informed them that their merchandise was safe and that Abu Sufyan had changed his route. Upon hearing this, 300 of the Banu Zuhrah left, leaving the Quraysh numbering around 1,000.

Muhammad was unaware of the Meccan army until one day before contact, when his men captured two Meccan waterbearers. Muhammad was not prepared for combat with an army of this size and held a council of war with his companions to decide on what to do next. After receiving the approval of both the Muhajirun and the Ansar, Muhammad marched toward Badr to meet the army of the Quraysh. The two armies met on 13 March. The battle began with duels between the champions of both sides before the Makkan army charged upon the Muslim ranks. Muhammad then gave the order to counter their charge and the Muslims quickly swept through the Makkan ranks. Several leaders of the Quraysh were among the 70 Meccans killed in this battle, including 'Amr ibn Hishām and Umayyah ibn Khalaf.

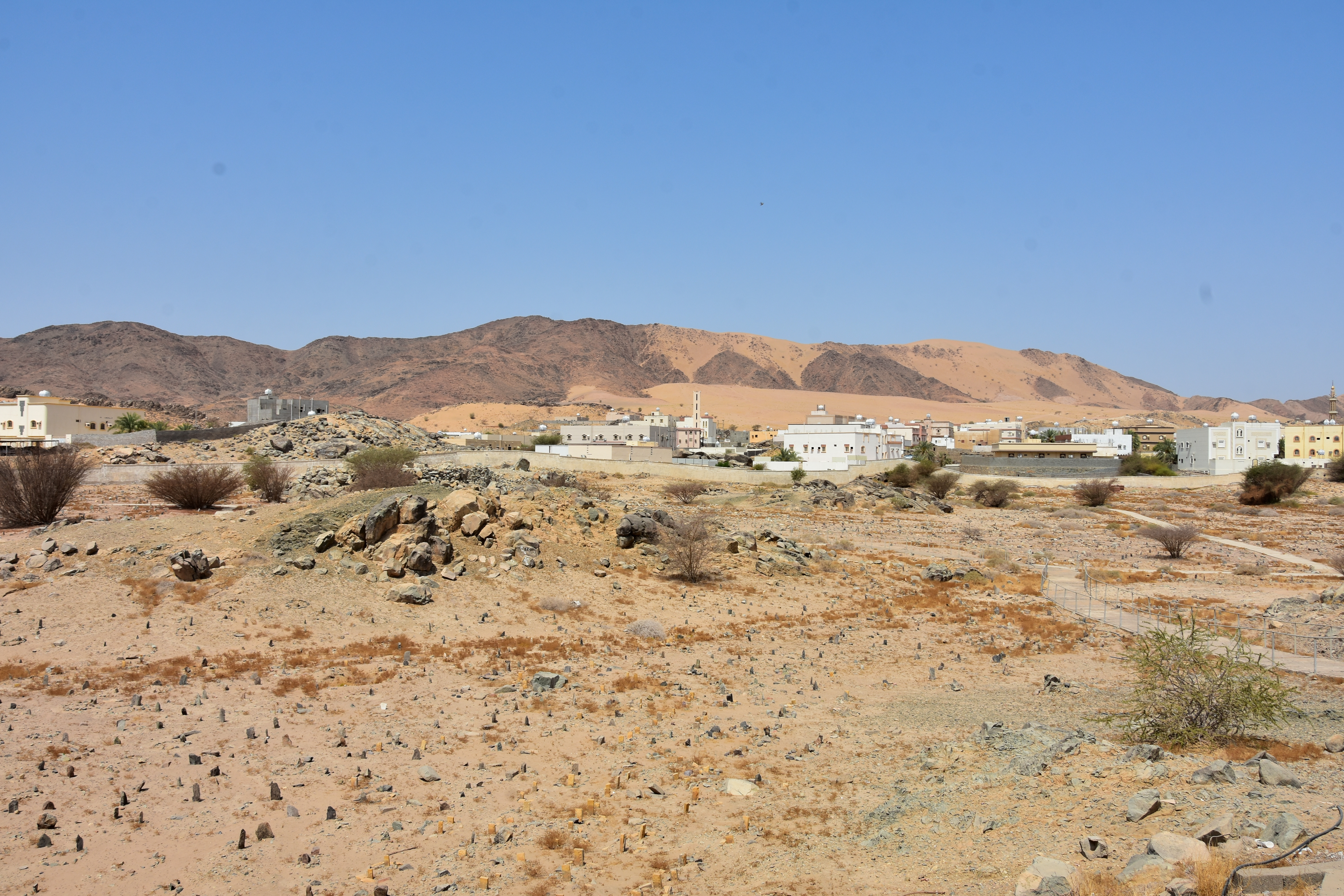
The battlefield and burial ground of the Muslims at Badr

On 13 March 624 (17 Ramadan 2 AH), Muhammad faced the Meccans in the first pitched battle, the Battle of Badr. The Muslims took up a defensive position. The battle started off with a duel between three Muslim and three Meccan champions, which the Muslims decided in their favour. Afterwards the two armies exchanged arrow fire, before finally clashing. The Meccan army eventually collapsed soon after the horse of Amr was brought down, resulting in the first major Muslim victory. This victory must not so much be ascribed to divine intervention as is done in the Islamic sources, but had several conventional reasons, like the Meccan inability to use their cavalry, the questioned leadership of Abu Jahl, (Note: Abu Jahl's initial task was merely the protection of the caravan, but he decided to bring the confrontation to the Muslims, possibly for the gain of glory or because he realized the need to extinguish the Muslim insurgency. The behaviour of Abu Jahl eventually resulted in divisions among the Quraysh warriors.) the Meccan lack of access to water and the higher morale of the Muslims. The battle took the lives of 14 Muslims, while the Meccan casualties numbered around 70. A similar number of them were captured and were either executed or kept for ransom. Amr ibn Hisham survived the battle, but with mortal injuries. A Muslim warrior found him, decapitated him and presented his head to Muhammad. Many more noblemen of the Quraysh had died in the fighting, which posed a significant blow to the Quraysh.

== Battle of Uhud ==
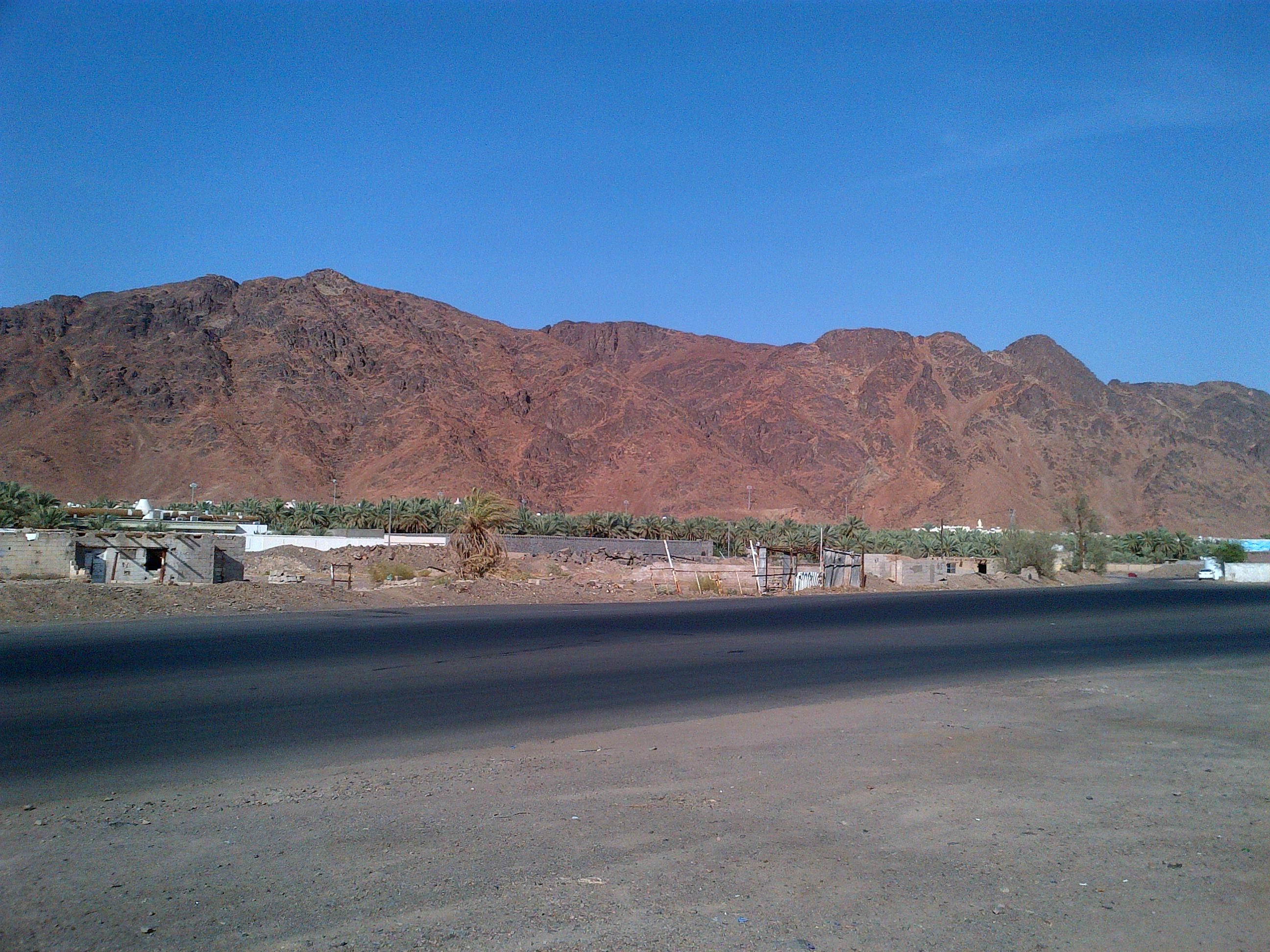
Mount Uhud, where the Battle of Uhud took place

Following the deaths of 'Amr ibn Hishām and other leaders of the Quraysh at Badr, Abu Sufyan ibn Harb, now the leader of Quraysh, wanted to avenge the losses of the Quraysh at Badr. In March 625, Abu Sufyan led an army of 3,000 men–almost three times the size of the Meccan army at Badr–to Medina. When the Muslims were informed of the presence of the Meccans, Muhammad called for a council of war. The senior members of the Muslim community, including Muhammad, wanted to take advantage of the Medinan fortifications, while the younger Muslims wanted to fight the Quraysh in the open. Muhammad eventually agreed with the latter. The Muslims, numbering around 1,000, left for Mount Uhud the next day. Shortly before the Muslims reached the battlefield, 300 men from their army led by Abd Allah ibn Ubayy returned to Medina, discontent with the decision to fight the Meccans in the open. Muhammad assigned 50 archers to a hill near Mount Uhud, now called the Mount of the Archers, ordering them to not leave their strategic position which protected the left flank of the Muslims.

Initially the Muslims prevailed over the Meccans, and seeing this, many of the archers descended from their position on the Mount of the Archers. Khalid ibn al-Walid, one of the most experienced warriors of the Quraysh, took advantage of this weakness in the Muslim ranks, maneuvering his units around the Mount of the Archers and outflanking the Muslims from the rear. Several Muslims were killed, and Muhammad was injured in the ensuing onslaught. The Muslims withdrew from the battlefield to the slopes of Mount Uhud, and Abu Sufyan decided to return to Mecca.

== Battle of the Trench ==
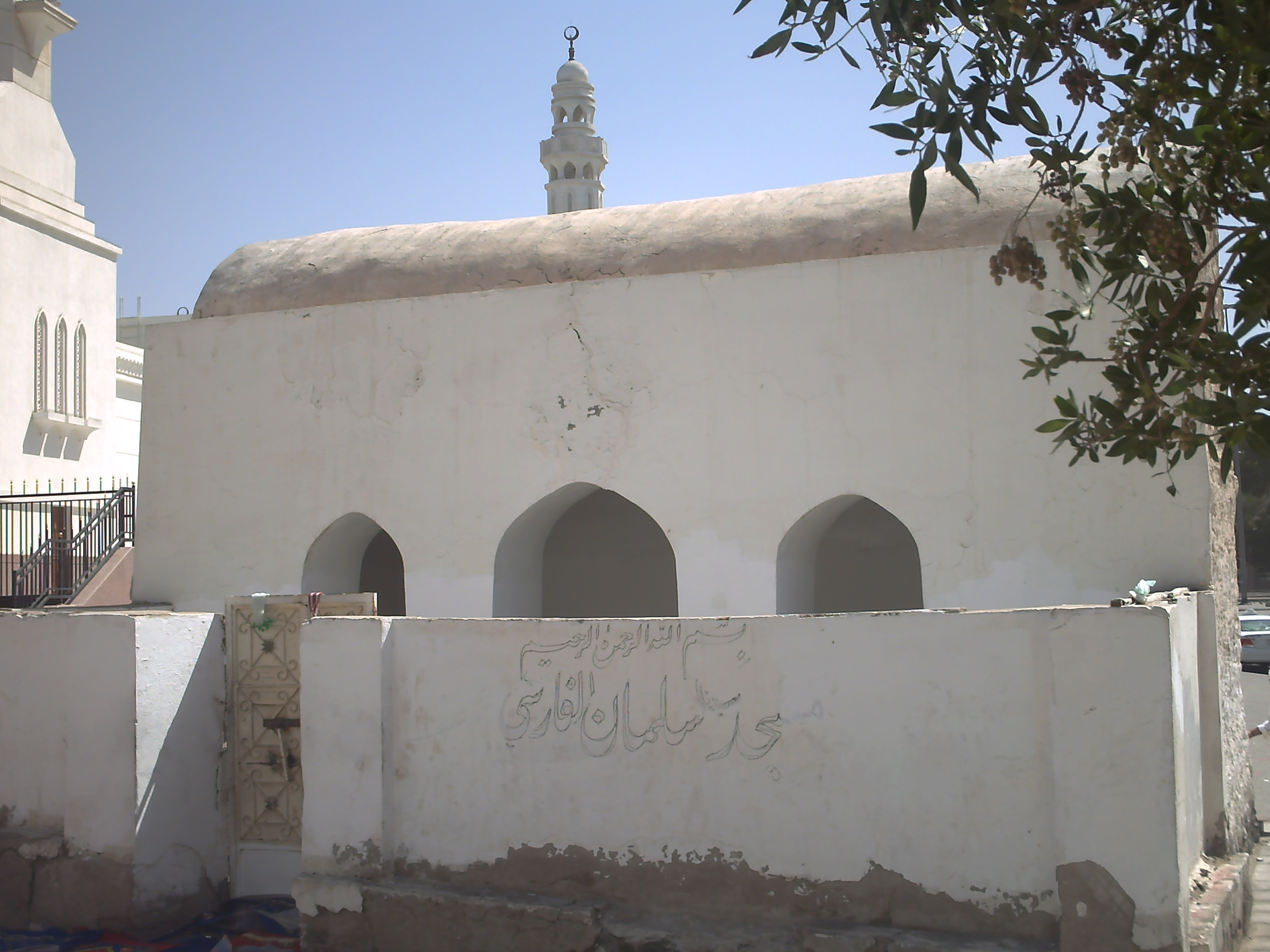
The mosque of Salman the Persian near the location of the Battle of the Trench in Medina

In October 625, Muhammad prepared a 300 men to meet a 1,000 strong Quraysh army at Badr for a second time. No fighting occurred between the two sides. In early 626, leaders of the Jewish tribe of Banu Nadir which was expelled from Medina in May 625 met with the Quraysh in Mecca and swore allegiance to Safwan ibn Umayya. Following this meeting, the Banu Nadir rallied the Arab tribes of Najd against Muhammad, whose forces combined with the army of the Quraysh numbered 10,000 men. This alliance, known as the Confederates (Arabic: الأَحْزَاب, romanized: al-Aḥzāb), marched on Medina in December 626.

Warned by the Banu Khuza'ah one week prior to the arrival of the Confederates, the Muslims dug a deep trench to avoid direct confrontation with them along the northern side of the Medina at the suggestion of Salman the Persian. The Muslims also harvested their crops early in anticipation of the arrival of the Quraysh-led confederacy. The ensuing siege of the city began in January 627. The Confederates tried to strike a deal with the Banu Qurayza, the last remaining Jewish tribe in Medina, but these attempts proved unworthy. Growing mutual distrust, loss of morale, lack of resources, and a failure to strike a deal with the Banu Qurayza led to a breakdown of the Confederates. The siege lasted 20 nights.

== Interim peace and pilgrimages ==
According to traditional Arab customs, the four months of Rajab, Dhu'l-Qa'da, Dhu'l-Hijja, and Muharram were considered sacred months in which tribal hostilities stopped and all were free to visit Mecca. In early 628, in Dhu'l-Qa'da 6 AH, Muhammad put on the ihram and led a contingent of Muslims and camels for sacrifice toward Mecca intending to perform the 'umrah. According to the early chronicler Ibn Ishaq, Muhammad took 700 men. According to Watt, Muhammad took 1,400 to 1,600 men. The Meccans did not accept the Muslim professions of peaceful intent and sent out an armed party against them. The Muslims evaded them by taking an unconventional route through the hills around Mecca, and then camped at Hudaybiyyah outside Mecca. Ibn Ishaq describes a tense period of embassies and counter-embassies, including a bold foray by the future caliph, 'Uthman ibn Affan, into the city of Mecca, where he was temporarily held as a hostage. The Meccans told the Muslims that 'Uthman had been killed and open warfare seemed imminent. After it was revealed that 'Uthman was alive, the Meccans expressed their willingness to negotiate a truce. Some elements wanted a confrontation, but Muhammad held out for a peaceful resolution. The Treaty of Hudaybiyyah committed both sides and their allies to a ten-year truce. The Muslims were to be allowed to return the next year, to perform the pilgrimage. The next year, in Dhu'l-Qa'da 7 AH, Muhammad returned to perform the 'umrah with 2,000 men, and some women and children. The Muslims performed the pilgrimage with their swords sheathed and were watched by the Quraysh from the peak of the Qaiqan mountain.

== Conquest of Mecca ==
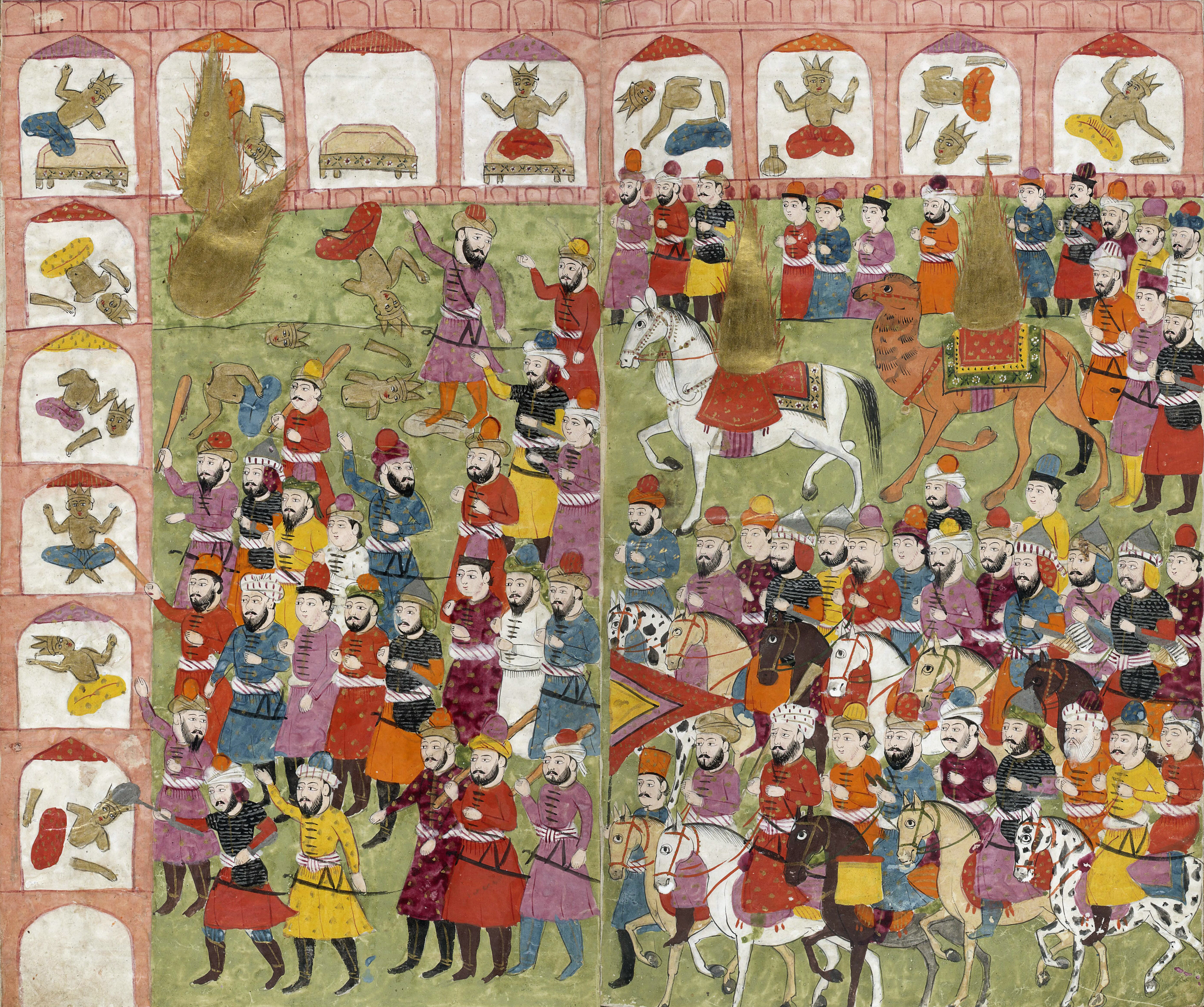
Early 19th century manuscript showing the Muslim army marching into Mecca and the subsequent smashing of its idols.

The Treaty of Hudaybiyyah was bilateral, and allowed any tribe that wanted to join either side to do so. The Banu Bakr had become allies of the Quraysh, while the Banu Khuzaʽah became allies of the Muslims. In late 629, in Sha'ban 8 AH, the Banu Bakr attacked the Banu Khuza'ah, assisted by the Quraysh. Abu Sufyan ibn Harb traveled to Medina to negotiate a renewal of the treaty, but his attempts proved unworthy. In the next Islamic month of Ramadan, Muhammad secretly led a Muslim force of 10,000 men and headed for Mecca. They camped outside Mecca and the usual round of emissaries and negotiations began. Abu Sufyan negotiated, then or earlier, a promise that he and those under his protection would not be attacked if they surrendered peacefully. A few of the Banu Makhzum prepared to resist.

Quran, Al-Isrā', verse 81

"And say: Truth hath come and falsehood hath vanished away. Lo! falsehood is ever bound to vanish."

— Recited by Muhammad during the Conquest of Mecca

In December 629 or January 630, Muhammad organized his troops into different divisions which he ordered to enter Mecca from different directions. Only Khalid ibn al-Walid's division met resistance, and a few Meccans were killed. The remaining Meccans surrendered to Muhammad. Some of the Meccans, even those who had been notable for their opposition to Islam, were spared. All idols of the pre-Islamic Arabian gods in and around the Kaaba were destroyed. However, according to one Shia tradition, he ordered an iconography of the virgin Mary and baby Jesus which was in the Kaaba not to be destroyed.

== See also ==
- Early Muslim conquests
- Badr

== Bibliography ==
- Armstrong, Karen (2002). Islam: A Short History. New York: Modern Library. ISBN 978-0-8129-6618-3.
- Bosworth, C. E.; Lewis; Pellat; Donzel, E. J. van (1998). Encyclopaedia of Islam, Volume V (Khe-Mahi): [Fasc. 79-98, 98a]. Brill. ISBN 978-90-04-07819-2.
- Buhl, F.; Welch, A.T. (1993). "Muḥammad". Encyclopaedia of Islam. Vol. 7 (2nd ed.). Brill. ISBN 978-90-04-09419-2.
- Gordon, Matthew (2005-05-30). The Rise of Islam. Greenwood Publishing Group. ISBN 978-0-313-32522-9.
- Hazleton, Lesley (4 February 2014). The First Muslim: The Story of Muhammad. Penguin. ISBN 978-1-59463-230-3.
- Lewis, Bernard (2002). The Arabs in History. Oxford, New York: Oxford University Press. ISBN 978-0-19-280310-8.
- Lings, Martin (1983). Muhammad: his life based on the earliest sources. Allen & Unwin. ISBN 0-04-297042-3.
- Mikaberidze, Alexander (2011). Conflict and Conquest in the Islamic World: A Historical Encyclopedia. Vol. 1. ABC-CLIO. ISBN 978-1598843361.
- Mubārakfūrī, Ṣafī al-Raḥmān. (2002). The Sealed Nectar: Biography of the Noble Prophet (Rev. ed.). Riyadh, Saudi Arabia: Dar-us-Salam Publications. ISBN 978-9960-899-55-8. OCLC 223400876.
- Muranyi, Miklos (1998). The Life of Muhammad. Ashgate. ISBN 978-0-86078-703-7.
- Nomani, Shibli (1970). Sirat al-Nabi. Karachi: Pakistan Historical Society.
- Rodgers, Russ (2012). The Generalship of Muhammad: Battles and Campaigns of the Prophet of Allah. University Press of Florida. ISBN 9780813042718.
- Rodinson, Maxime (2002). Muhammad: Prophet of Islam. Tauris Parke Paperbacks. ISBN 1-86064-827-4.
- Watt, William Montgomery (1956). Muhammad at Medina. Clarendon Press.
- Watt, William Montgomery (1961). Muhammad: Prophet and Statesman. Oxford University Press.
- Watt, William Montgomery (1974). Muhammad: prophet and statesman. Oxford University Press. ISBN 978-0-19-881078-0.
