= Jihad verse =

Verses on jihad in the Quran

In the Quran, the concept of jihad is addressed in various verses. These verses have been a subject of debate among Islamic scholars. This term generally means "striving in the way of Allah" and encompasses both internal (struggle with nafs) and external (defense or tabligh struggle) dimensions. A person who has dedicated their life to jihad is called a mujahid (pl. mujahideen).

Jihad verses are concentrated in surahs revealed during the Medinan period, such as Al-Baqarah, Al Imran, An-Nisa, At-Tawbah, and Al-Anfal, which regulate matters including warfare, peace, the treatment of captives, the distribution of spoils, and Muslims' stance toward adversaries. These verses are historically contextualized within the post-Hijrah defensive necessities from Mecca to Medina, as well as events like the Treaty of al-Hudaybiya and the battles of Badr, Uhud, and the Trench.

But once the sacred months have passed, kill the all non-Muslims (kafir) who violated their treaties wherever you find them, capture them, besiege them, and lie in wait for them on every way. But if they repent, perform prayers, and pay alms-tax, then set them free. Indeed, Allah is All-Forgiving, Most Merciful.

— Surah At-Tawbah 9:5

== Al-Baqarah ==
And fight in the cause of Allah against those who fight you, but do not transgress, Allah does not like the aggressors.

— 2:190

Fighting has been made obligatory upon you believers, though you dislike it. Perhaps you dislike something which is good for you and like something which is bad for you. Allah knows and you do not know.

— 2:216

Surely those who have believed, emigrated, and struggled in the Way of Allah—they can hope for Allah's mercy. And Allah is All-Forgiving, Most Merciful.

— 2:218

Fight in the cause of Allah, and know that Allah is All-Hearing, All-Knowing.

— 2:244

Have you not seen those chiefs of the Children of Israel after Moses? They said to one of their prophets, "Appoint for us a king, and we will fight in the cause of Allah." He said, "Are you not going to cower if ordered to fight?" They replied, "How could we refuse to fight in the cause of Allah, while we were driven out of our homes and separated from our children?" But when they were ordered to fight, they fled, except for a few of them. And Allah has perfect knowledge of the wrongdoers.

— 2:246

== Al Imran ==
Do you think you will enter Paradise without Allah proving which of you truly struggled for His cause and patiently endured?

— 3:142

Imagine how many devotees fought along with their prophets and never faltered despite whatever losses they suffered in the cause of Allah, nor did they weaken or give in! Allah loves those who persevere.

— 3:146

Never think of those martyred in the cause of Allah as dead. In fact, they are alive with their Lord, well provided for.

— 3:169

== An-Nisa ==
Let those who would sacrifice this life for the Hereafter fight in the cause of Allah. And whoever fights in Allah's cause—whether they achieve martyrdom or victory. We will honour them with a great reward.

— 4:74

Those believers who stay at home—except those with valid excuses—are not equal to those who strive in the cause of Allah with their wealth and their lives. Allah has elevated in rank those who strive with their wealth and their lives above those who stay behind with valid excuses. Allah has promised each a fine reward, but those who strive will receive a far better reward than others.

— 4:95

So fight in the cause of Allah O Prophet. You are accountable for none but yourself. And motivate the believers to fight, so perhaps Allah will curb the disbelievers' might. And Allah is far superior in might and in punishment.

— 4:84

== Criticisms and response ==
Abdul Majid Daryabadi also explains the historical context of this verse:

Persecuted, harassed, afflicted, poverty-ridden, exiled, and small in number as the Muslims were at the time of the enactment of warfare, it was but natural that they were none too fond of crossing swords with the mighty forces that had conspired for their extirpation. Nothing short of express and emphatic Divine Command could urge them on to the field of battle [in order to defend their rights]. And yet the Islamic jihads are declared to be ‘designed by the Prophet to satisfy his discontented adherents by an accession of plunder!’ (Margoliouth). Such is this European scholar’s love of veracity! Such is his wonderful reading of history!
