= Fitna (word) =

Arabic word for strife and conflict

Fitna (or fitnah, pl. fitan; Arabic: فتن ,فتنة: "temptation, trial; sedition, civil strife, conflict") is an Arabic term that denotes concepts such as temptation, trial, sedition, civil strife, and conflict. The term encompasses a broad range of connotations, including trial, affliction, and distress. While it holds significant historical importance, the word is also widely used in modern Arabic, often without reference to its historical connotations.

A distinction can be observed between the meanings of fitna as used in Classical Arabic and its meanings as used in Modern Standard Arabic and various colloquial dialects. Given the conceptual significance of fitna in the Quran, its Quranic usage warrants separate consideration from, though in addition to, its broader lexical meaning in Classical Arabic.

In Islamic historiography, fitna specifically refers to civil wars within a Muslim polity, notably the five civil wars of the Islamic Caliphate between the 7th and 9th centuries CE starting with the First Fitna.

== Root and forms ==
Arabic, in common with other Semitic languages like Hebrew, employs a system of root letters combined with vowel patterns to constitute its whole range of vocabulary. As such, identification of the root letters of any word might bring a better understanding the word's full semantic range.

Fitna has the triliteral root fā'-tā'-nūn (Arabic: ف ت ن). In addition to the feminine noun fitna, fitan, this root forms, in particular, a Form I active verb fatana, yaftinu (Arabic: فتن ، يفتن), a Form I passive verb futina, yuftanu (Arabic: فتن ، يفتن), a Form I maṣdar futūn (Arabic: فتون), a Form I active participle fātin (Arabic: فاتن), a Form I passive participle maftūn (Arabic: مفتون), and so on.

== Lexical meanings ==
=== Classical Arabic ===
Edward William Lane, in his Arabic-English Lexicon compiled from various traditional Arabic lexicographical sources available in Cairo in the mid-19th-century, reported that "to burn" is the "primary signification" of the verb. The verb then came to be applied to the smelting of gold and silver. It was extended to mean causing one to enter into fire and into a state of punishment or affliction. Thus, one says that something caused one to enter al-fitna, i.e. trial, affliction, etc., or more generally, an affliction whereby some good or evil quality is put to the test. Lane glosses the noun fitna as meaning a trial, a probation, affliction, distress or hardship, and says that "the sum total of its meaning in the language of the Arabs" is an affliction whereby one is tried, proved or tested.

The definitions offered by Lane match those suggested by Badawi and Haleem in their dictionary of Quranic usage. They gloss the triliteral root as having the following meanings: "to purify gold and silver by smelting them; to burn; to put to the test, to afflict (in particular as a means of testing someone's endurance); to disrupt the peace of a community; to tempt, to seduce, to allure, to infatuate."

=== Modern Standard Arabic ===
The meanings of fitna as found in Classical Arabic largely carry over into Modern Standard Arabic, as evidenced by the recitation of the same set of meanings in Hans Wehr's Dictionary of Modern Written Arabic. In addition, Wehr glosses the noun fitna as also meaning "charm, charmingness, attractiveness; enchantment, captivation, fascination, enticement, temptation; infatuation, intrigue; sedition, riot, discord, dissension, civil strife."

Buckwalter & Parkinson, in their frequency dictionary of Arabic, list the noun fitna as the 1,560th most frequent word in their corpus of over 30 million words from Modern Standard Arabic and colloquial Arabic dialects. They gloss fitna as meaning "charm, allure, enchantment; unrest; riot, rebellion."

== Nakhla Raid (first mention of fitna in Quran) ==
The first Quran verse about fitna was supposedly revealed during the Nakhla Raid. After his return from the first Badr encounter (Battle of Safwan), Muhammad sent Abdullah ibn Jahsh in Rajab with 12 men on a fact-finding operation. Abdullah ibn Jahsh was a maternal cousin of Muhammad. He took along with him Abu Haudhayfa, Abdullah ibn Jahsh, Ukkash ibn Mihsan, Utba b. Ghazwan, Sa'd ibn Abi Waqqas, Amir ibn Rabia, Waqid ibn Abdullah and Khalid ibn al-Bukayr. Muhammad gave Abdullah ibn Jahsh a letter, but not to be read until he had traveled for two days and then to do what he was instructed to do in the letter without putting pressure on his companions. Abdullah proceeded for two days, then he opened the letter; it told him to proceed until he reached Nakhla, between Mecca and Taif, to lie in wait for the Quraysh, and to observe what they were doing.

While the Quraysh were busy preparing food, the Muslims attacked. In the short battle that took place, Waqid ibn Abdullah killed Amr ibn Hadrami, the leader of the Quraysh caravan, with an arrow. The Muslims captured two Quraysh tribe members. Nawfal ibn Abdullah managed to escape. The Muslims took Uthman ibn Abdullah and al-Hakam ibn Kaysan as captives. Abdullah ibn Jahsh returned to Medina with the booty and with the two captured Quraysh tribe members. The followers planned to give one-fifth of the booty to Muhammad.

=== Mention in the Quran ===
Muhammad initially disapproved of that act and suspended any action as regards the camels and the two captives on account of the prohibited months. The Arab pagans exploited this opportunity to accuse the Muslims of violating what is divinely inviolable (fighting in the months considered sacred to the Arab pagans). This idle talk brought about a painful headache for Muhammad's companions, until at last they were relieved when Muhammad revealed a verse regarding fighting in the sacred months

They ask you ˹O Prophet˺ about fighting in the sacred months (i.e. 1st, 7th, 11th and 12th months of the Islamic calendar). Say, “Fighting during these months is a great sin. But hindering ˹others˺ from the Path of Allah, rejecting Him, and expelling the worshippers from the Sacred Mosque (at Makkah) is ˹a˺ greater ˹sin˺ in the sight of Allah. For persecution (Al-Fitnah) is far worse than killing. And they will not stop fighting you until they turn you away from your faith—if they can. And whoever among you renounces their own faith and dies a disbeliever, their deeds will become void in this life and in the Hereafter. It is they who will be the residents of the Fire. They will be there forever.

— Surah Al-Baqara 2:217

According to Ibn Qayyim, "most of the scholars have explained the word Fitnah here as meaning Shirk"

The Muslim Mufassir Ibn Kathir's commentary on this verse in his book Tafsir ibn Kathir is as follows: means, trying to force the Muslims to revert from their religion and re-embrace Kufr after they had believed, is worse with Allah than killing.' Allah said:

They ask you concerning fighting in the Sacred Months. Say, "Fighting therein is a great (transgression) but a greater (transgression) with Allah is to prevent mankind from following the way of Allah, to disbelieve in Him, to prevent access to Al-Masjid Al-Haram (at Makkah), and to drive out its inhabitants, and Al-Fitnah is worse than killing.

This Ayah means, `If you had killed during the Sacred Month, they (disbelievers of Quraysh) have hindered you from the path of Allah and disbelieved in it. They also prevented you from entering the Sacred Mosque, and expelled you from it, while you are its people,

(...a greater (transgression) with Allah) than killing whom you killed among them. Also:

(...and Al-Fitnah is worse than killing.) This means that trying to force Muslims to revert from their religion and re-embrace Kufr after they had believed is worse than killing, says Allah.' Allah said:

(And they will never cease fighting you until they turn you back from your religion (Islamic Monotheism) if they can.)

So, they will go on fighting you with unrelenting viciousness.

Ibn Ishaq went on: When the Qur'an touched this subject and Allah brought relief to the Muslims instead of the sadness that had befallen them, Allah's Messenger took possession of the caravan and the two prisoners. The Quraysh offered to ransom the two prisoners, `Uthman bin `Abdullah and Hakam bin Kaysan. Allah's Messenger said:

(We will not accept your ransom until our two companions return safely. ) meaning Sa`d bin Abu Waqqas and `Utbah bin Ghazwan, "For we fear for their safety with you. If you kill them, we will kill your people."

== In the Quran ==
=== Statistics ===
Badawi & Haleem note that the triliteral root fā'-tā'-nūn (Arabic: ف ت ن) occurs in 6 different forms a total of 60 times in the Quran. In particular, it appears 34 times as a noun and 26 times in various verbal forms. Bakhtiar's concordance of the Quran confirms Badawi & Haleem's numbers, although Bakhtiar further breaks down the appearance of each verbal form by distinguishing active and passive verbs by tense as well. The following table sets out the details; note that since the root only appears as a verb in Form I forms, that is assumed.

Form	Number of Appearances
Noun	34
Verb, perfect active	9
Verb, imperfect active	8
Verb, perfect passive	2
Verb, imperfect passive	4
Participle, active	1
Participle, passive	1
Maṣdar	1

=== Semantics ===
The triliteral root fā'-tā'-nūn (Arabic: ف ت ن), as noted above, bears a range of significations, even in the Quran itself. The Quranic appearances of the root are explored below (in no particular order).

==== Persecution ====
Fitna as persecution appears in several of the verses commanding Muslims to fight the unbelievers (specifically referring to the Meccan polytheists who had persecuted Muhammad and his early followers, thus leading to the hijra). For example, in Quran 2:191, the command to fight is justified on the grounds that "persecution (al-fitnatu) is worse than slaying." Similarly, in Quran 2:193, Muslims are forbidden from fighting unbelievers around the Holy Mosque in Mecca unless the unbelievers attack first, in which case Muslims are to fight "until there is no persecution (fitnatun) and the religion is God's." The hijra is mentioned in Quran 16:110 as having occurred because of the persecution believers had suffered in Mecca. Other examples are Quran 85:10, which promises the chastisement of Hell for those who have persecuted Muslims, and Quran 4:101, which provides that one's daily required prayer may be shortened if, when on a journey, one fears that the unbelievers may attack if one remains in a place long enough to complete the full prayer.

==== Dissension/sedition ====
In Quran 3:7, the Quran itself is described as having "clear revelations – they are the substance of the Book – and others (which are) allegorical," and then the Quran characterizes those who are unsteady and who do not have firm faith as desiring dissension in the community through their pursuit of interpretations of the "allegorical" verses of the Quran. A set of occurrences of the root related to dissension or sedition occurs in Quran 9:47-49, where those who say they are believers, but show themselves reluctant to follow certain of God's commands, are described as seeking "sedition" among the community.

==== Trial ====
Many instances of the root as "trial" appear throughout the Quran. This sense of the root bears the further sense of a "tribulation" or "difficulty" in such verses as, for example: Quran 20:40, where Moses, after killing a man in Egypt, was "tried with a heavy trial" by being forced to flee and to live among the Midians for many years; and Quran 22:11, where some believers are characterized as worshipping God "upon a narrow marge," since they are happy so long as their life is relatively secure and easy, but as soon as they experience a trial, they turn away from God.

However, the root in other verses carries a sense of "trial" as simply a kind of test of a person's commitment to their faith (without necessarily implying that the testing results from something bad happening, as the sense of trial as "tribulation" might bear). For example, Quran 6:53 says, in part, "And even so do We try some of them by others." Things widely recognized as good things in life may serve as trials, as Quran 8:28 and 64:15 make clear by describing one's own wealth and children as trials. Quran 39:49 also carries this sense of trial by something good; there, God's own "boon" (or "blessing") is described as a trial for certain people. Again, in Quran 72:14-15, God will give those idolaters who decide to "tread the right path" an abundance of good "that We may test them thereby," to see whether they will turn away from God once they have obtained his favor or whether they will be steadfast in faith.

Trials may also result from things revealed by God that some may find difficult to accept. For example, Quran 17:60 describes the revelation of the "Cursed Tree" as "an ordeal for mankind." Another example of this sense is Quran 74:31, where the number of the angels who guard the Fire has been "made a stumbling-block for those who disbelieve ... and that those in whose hearts there is disease, and disbelievers, may say: What meaneth Allah by this similitude?"

==== Temptation ====
The root also bears the sense of "temptation," as in Quran 57:14, where those who were hypocritical in their faith will be turned away and told by the steadfast believers, from whom they are separated, "ye tempted one another, and hesitated, and doubted, and vain desires beguiled you till the ordinance of Allah came to pass; and the deceiver deceived you concerning Allah." In Quran 20:90, Aaron is said to have warned the Israelites, when Moses had left them to meet with God for forty days, that the Golden Calf was only something they were being tempted by (or, in Pickthall's translation, "seduced with"). Harut and Marut warn the people of Babylon, in Quran 2:102, "We are only a temptation, therefore disbelieve not," although the warning proved to be ineffective for some.

== Historical usage ==
A fitna mention in hadith

Aside from its use in the Quran, fitna came to have a primary sense of "'revolt', 'disturbances', 'civil war', but a civil war that breeds schism and in which the believers' purity of faith is in grave danger." This was especially so as it came, in the term First Fitna, to refer to the first major civil war of the Islamic Caliphate, which lasted from 656 to 661. "On account of the struggles that marked Mu'āwiya's advent, the term fitna was later applied to any period of disturbances inspired by schools or sects that broke away from the majority of believers." The term thus appears the descriptions of other major conflicts such as the Second Fitna (680–692), the Third Fitna (744–747), the Fourth Fitna (809–827), the Fifth Fitna (865–866), and the Fitna of al-Andalus (1009–1031).

== See also ==
- Arab Winter
- Temptation
- Fitnat al-Wahhabiyya
