= Raid on Nakhla =

Muslim military expedition to Nakhla in October 623 AD

Coordinates: 22°29′51.8″N 39°53′50.9″E

Raid on Nakhla سرِيَّة نَخْلَة
Date	29 or 30 Rajab AH 2 (c. 26 or 27 January AD 624
Location	Nakhla, Hejaz, Arabian Peninsula
Result	Successful raid

Belligerents
Muslims of Medina	Quraysh of Mecca

Commanders and leaders
Abd Allah ibn Jahsh	Amr ibn al-Hadrami †

Strength
8–12	4

Casualties and losses
0	1 killed (2 captured)

The Raid on Nakhla (Arabic: سرِيَّة نَخْلَة) was a raid that was initially unplanned by the companions of Muhammad, but is considered to be the first successful raid against the Meccans, since it was carried out during an espionage event. This raid took place at Nakhla, in the Hejazi region of what is now Saudi Arabia. It took place in Rajab A.H. 2 (January AD 624). The commander was 'Abdullah ibn Jahsh al-Asadi, whom Muhammad dispatched to Nakhla as the head of 12 Emigrants with six camels. (Note: This book contains a list of battles of Muhammad in Arabic, English translation available here "Archived copy". Archived from the original on 2011-07-26..) The Muslims obtained rich plunder from the raid and brought it before Muhammad in Medina. However, this sparked controversy among the people since warfare was strictly forbidden during the holy month by Pagan convention and a raid was a transgression against the agreement.

== Background and participants ==
Before the first Badr encounter (Battle of Safwan), Muhammad sent his brother-in-law Abdullah ibn Jahsh, in Rajab with 12 men on a fact-finding operation. Abdullah took along with him Abu Hudhayfa, Abdullah ibn Jahsh, Ukasha ibn al-Mihsan, Utba b. Ghazwan, Sa'd ibn Abi Waqqas, Amir ibn Rabi'a, Waqid ibn Abdullah and Khalid ibn al-Bukayr. Muhammad gave Ibn Jahsh a letter, but not to be read until he had travelled for two days and then to do what he was instructed to do in the letter without putting pressure on his companions. Abdullah proceeded for two days, then he opened the letter; it told him to proceed until he reached Nakhla, between Mecca and Taif, lie in wait for the Quraysh and observe what they were doing.

Ibn Jahsh told his companions that whoever chose martyrdom was free to join him and whoever did not could go back. All the companions agreed to follow him (a few biographers write that two Muslims decided not to be martyrs and chose to return to Medina). Sa'd ibn Abi Waqqas and Utbah ibn Ghazwan lost a camel that they were taking turns to ride. The camel strayed and went to Buhran, so they went out looking for the runaway camel to Buhran and fell behind the group.

== The attack ==
Participants were:

- Amr ibn al-Hadrami, leader of the caravan
- Uthman bin Abdullah ibn al-Mughirah from the tribe of Makhzum
- Nawfal bin Abdullah ibn al-Mughirah, (Uthman bin Abdullah's brother)
- Al-Hakam ibn Kaysan, the freed slave (Mawla) of Hisham ibn al-Mughirah

At Nakhlah, the caravan passed carrying loads of raisins (dried grapes), food stuff and other commodities. Notable polytheists were also there such as 'Amr bin Al-Hadrami, 'Uthman and Naufal, sons of 'Abdullah bin Al-Mugheerah and others. The Muslims held consultations among themselves with respect to fighting them taking into account Rajab which was a sacred month (during which, along with Dhul Hijja, Dhul Qa‘da and Muharram, war activities were suspended as was the custom in Arabia then).

One of Abdullah's men, Ukasha ibn al-Mihsan, was shaven in head to hide the real purpose of their journey and to give the Quraysh the impression of lesser Hajj (Umrah); for it was the month (Rajab) when hostilities were forbidden. When the Quraysh saw the shaven head of Ukkash, they thought that the group was on its way for pilgrimage and they felt relieved and began to set up camp. They said, "These people seek the `Umrah, so there is no need to fear them." The sacred months of the Arab pagans were the 1st, 7th, 11th and 12th months of the Islamic calendar according to the Muslim scholar Safiur Rahman Mubarakpuri.

Nevertheless, after much deliberation, the group did not want this rich caravan to escape. Abdullah bin Jahsh said: "Surely, if you allow the caravan to pass through tonight unmolested, they will reach the holy territory tomorrow and will thereby become forbidden to you. And yet if you kill them today, you will have killed them in the holy month when killing is forbidden". After hesitating and then convincing one another they decided to attack and take the booty/possessions.

While they (the Quraysh) were busy preparing food, the Muslims attacked. In the short battle that took place, Waqid ibn Abdullah killed Amr ibn Hadrami by shooting an arrow at the leader of the Qurayshi caravan. The Muslims captured two Quraysh tribe members. Nawfal ibn Abdullah managed to escape. The Muslims took Uthman ibn Abdullah and al-Hakam ibn Kaysan as captives. Abdullah ibn Jahsh returned to Medina with the booty and with the two captured Quraysh tribe members. The followers planned to give one-fifth of the booty to Muhammad.

== Aftermath ==
The Muslims gained abundant booty from the raid and brought it before Muhammad in Medina. But since this was done in the holy month where bloodshed was forbidden at the time according to Pagan convention, it received a wave of indignation in the city. Muhammad stated that his followers had mistaken his instruction, and he refused to take his one-fifth portion of the plunder until a verse was finally revealed, justifying the attack.

=== Islamic primary sources ===
Muhammad initially disapproved of that act and suspended any action as regards the camels and the two captives on account of the prohibited months. The Arab pagans exploited this opportunity to accuse the Muslims of violating what is divinely inviolable (fighting in the months considered sacred to the Arabs). This idle talk brought about a painful headache to Muhammad’s Companions, until they felt relieved thanks to an apocryphal verse they attributed to Allah regarding fighting in the sacred months.

They ask you concerning fighting in the sacred months. Say, "Fighting therein is a great (transgression) but a greater (transgression) with Allâh is to prevent mankind from following the way of Allâh, to disbelieve in Him, to prevent access to Al-Masjid-Al-Ḥarâm, and to drive out its inhabitants, and Al-Fitnah is worse than killing."

According to Ibn Qayyim al-Jawziyyah, Allah says that what the attackers did may be serious, but the sins of the Quraysh like disbelief, preventing people from "following way of Allah", expelling Muslims from Mecca, the Shirk which they practiced and the Fitnah resulting from your actions is a greater sin. Ibn Qayyim further states that "most of the scholars have explained the word Fitnah here as meaning Shirk; and the truth of it is the Shirk which its owner calls to, and he punishes those who are not put to trial by it (i.e. those who do not accept it)."

The Muslim commentator Ibn Kathir's commentary on this verse in his book Tafsir ibn Kathir is as follows:

Allah said:

They ask you concerning fighting in the Sacred Months. Say, "Fighting therein is a great (transgression) but a greater (transgression) with Allah is to prevent mankind from following the way of Allah, to disbelieve in Him, to prevent access to Al-Masjid Al-Haram, and to drive out its inhabitants, and Al-Fitnah is worse than killing.)

This Ayah means, `If you had killed during the Sacred Month, they (disbelievers of Quraysh) have hindered you from the path of Allah and disbelieved in it. They also prevented you from entering the Sacred Mosque, and expelled you from it, while you are its people,

(...a greater (transgression) with Allah) than killing whom you killed among them. Also:

(...and Al-Fitnah is worse than killing.) means, trying to force the Muslims to revert from their religion and re-embrace Kufr after they had believed, is worse with Allah than killing.' Allah said:

(And they will never cease fighting you until they turn you back from your religion (Islamic Monotheism) if they can.)

So, they will go on fighting you with unrelenting viciousness.

Ibn Ishaq went on: When the Qur'an touched this subject and Allah brought relief to the Muslims instead of the sadness that had befallen them, Allah's Messenger took possession of the caravan and the two prisoners. The Quraysh offered to ransom the two prisoners, `Uthman bin `Abdullah and Hakam bin Kaysan. Allah's Messenger said:

(We will not accept your ransom until our two companions return safely.) meaning Sa`d bin Abu Waqqas and `Utbah bin Ghazwan, "For we fear for their safety with you. If you kill them, we will kill your people.

According to Ibn Kathir, Muhammad refused to accept ransom until he was sure his companions were safe, he also threatened to kill the captives. He said: "For we fear for their safety with you. If you kill them, we will kill your people", Ibn Kathir cites Ibn Ishaq's 7th century biography of Muhammad as the primary source for this quote. The Muslim scholar Muhammad Husayn Haykal also mentions this and said the verse which permitted Muslims to fight in the months which were considered sacred by the Arab pagans had "brought the Muslims relief", and that then Muhammad had accepted his share of the booty.

Soon after his release, al-Hakam bin Kaysan, one of the two prisoners captured, became a Muslim. Mubarakpuri mentions that the Quran verse 47:20 was also sent down, dispraising the hypocrites and cowards who are scared of fighting, and exhorted Muslims to fight.

== See also ==
- List of expeditions of Muhammad
- Military career of Muhammad
- Muslim–Quraysh War
