= Expedition of Kurz bin Jabir Al-Fihri =

Expedition of Karz bin Jabir Al-Fihri
Date	February 628 AD, 10th month 6 AH
Location	Medina
Result	Robbers captured and crucified

Commanders and leaders
Kurz ibn Jabir Al-Fihri	Unknown

Strength
30	8

Casualties and losses
1 killed	8 killed

The expedition of Kurz bin Jabir Al-Fihri took place in February 628AD, 10th month of 6AH of the Islamic calendar. The attack was directed at eight robbers who killed a Muslim. The Muslims captured the robbers and crucified them (according to the Islamic sources). The Quran verse 5:33 about the punishment of those who spread mischief in the land (Fasad), was revealed in this event.

== Background and attack ==
Eight members of Banu Uraynah, a Bedouin tribe, came to Muhammad and embraced Islam. They stayed in Madinah but found its climate didn’t suit them, so they were asked to pitch their tents in the pastures nearby, and were given water to drink. They subsequently attacked Muhammad’s shepherd Yasar, a freed slave, killed him, gouged his eyes out, and then drove off the camels. Some narrations claim that more than one person were killed.

This news reached Muhammad, who sent a group of twenty Muslims led by Karz bin Jabir Al-Fihri on their track. The accused were brought back and handed over to Muhammad. He had their hands and feet cut off and their eyes gouged out with hot iron, in recompense for their behaviour, and then they were thrown on the stony ground until they died.

According to the Muslim scholar Muhammad ibn Abi Bakr, the eight men were killed "according to the law of equality" in Islam.

In this event, the verses on the punishment of waging war against Allah and for theft were revealed (5:33-5:39).

== Criticism ==
The Non Muslim historian Sir William Muir, criticised this event and referred to it as the “Barbarous execution of eight robbers”. However, the robbers were punished under the law of equality for murdering Muhammad's freed slave, Yasar.

== Islamic primary sources ==
In this event, the verses on the punishment of waging war against Allah and for theft were revealed (5:33-5:39). It states:

The punishment of those who wage war against Allah and His Messenger, and strive with might and main for mischief through the land is: execution, or crucifixion, or the cutting off of hands and feet from opposite sides, or exile from the land: that is their disgrace in this world, and a heavy punishment is theirs in the Hereafter. ^{[Quran 5:33]}

The commentary of the famous Muslim Scholar and Quran commentator Ibn Kathir in his Tafsir, is as follows:

(The recompense of those who wage war against Allah and His Messenger and do mischief in the land is only that they shall be killed or crucified or their hands and their feet be cut off on the opposite sides, or be exiled from the land.)

`Wage war' mentioned here means, oppose and contradict, and it includes disbelief, blocking roads and spreading fear in the fairways. Mischief in the land refers to various types of evil. Ibn Jarir recorded that `Ikrimah and Al-Hasan Al-Basri said that the Ayat,

(The recompense of those who wage war against Allah and His Messenger) until,

(Allah is Of-Forgiving, Most Merciful,) "Were revealed about the idolators. Therefore, the Ayah decrees that, whoever among them repents before you apprehend them, then you have no right to punish them. This Ayah does not save a Muslim from punishment if he kills, causes mischief in the land or wages war against Allah and His Messenger and then joins rank with the disbelievers, before the Muslims are able to catch him. He will still be liable for punishment for the crimes he committed." Abu Dawud and An-Nasa'i recorded that `Ikrimah said that Ibn `Abbas said that the Ayah,

(The recompense of those who wage war against Allah and His Messenger and do mischief in the land...) "Was revealed concerning the idolators, those among them who repent before being apprehended, they will still be liable for punishment for the crimes they committed." The correct opinion is that this Ayah is general in meaning and includes the idolators and all others who commit the types of crimes the Ayah mentioned.

[Tafsir ibn Kathir, Surah Maidah 5:39, "The Punishment of those who cause mischief in the Land"]

The event is also mentioned in the Sunni Hadith collection, Sahih Bukhari as follows:

Then they killed the shepherd and drove away the camels, and they became unbelievers(apostates) after they were Muslims. When the Prophet was informed by a shouter for help, he sent some men in their pursuit, and before the sun rose high, they were brought, 'and he had their hands and feet cut off. Then he ordered for nails which were heated and passed over their eyes, and they were left in the Harra (i.e. rocky land in Medina). They asked for water, and nobody provided them with water till they died (Abu Qilaba, a sub-narrator said, "They committed murder and theft and fought against Allah and His Apostle, and spread evil in the land.") Sahih al-Bukhari, 4:52:261, Sahih al-Bukhari, 1:4:234, Sahih al-Bukhari, 5:59:505, Sahih al-Bukhari, 7:71:623, Sahih al-Bukhari, 8:82:794, Sahih al-Bukhari, 8:82:796 Sahih al-Bukhari, 8:82:797

== See also ==
- Military career of Muhammad
- List of expeditions of Muhammad
