= Kurz ibn Jabir al-Fihri =

Companion of Muhammad

Kurz ibn Jabir al-Fihri was a companion of Muhammad but used to be an enemy. During the Invasion of Safwan he rustled some grazing cattle belonging to the Muslim community. Muhammad sent seventy Muslims after him, who chased him to Safwan, at the outskirts of Badr. But Kurz ibn Jabir al-Fihri managed to escape.

He later converted to Islam and fought on the Muslim side, and Muhammad made him commander of an operation known as the expedition of Kurz bin Jabir Al-Fihri which took place in February 628 AD, the 10th month of the year 6 AH of the Islamic calendar. The attack was directed at eight robbers who killed a Muslim. The Muslims captured the robbers and crucified them (according to the Islamic sources). The Quran verse ^{[Quran 5:33]} about the punishment of those who spread mischief in the land, was revealed in this event.

== See also ==
- List of expeditions of Muhammad
