= Jabal al-Malaika =

Sand hill in Saudi Arabia

- Mountain of the angels
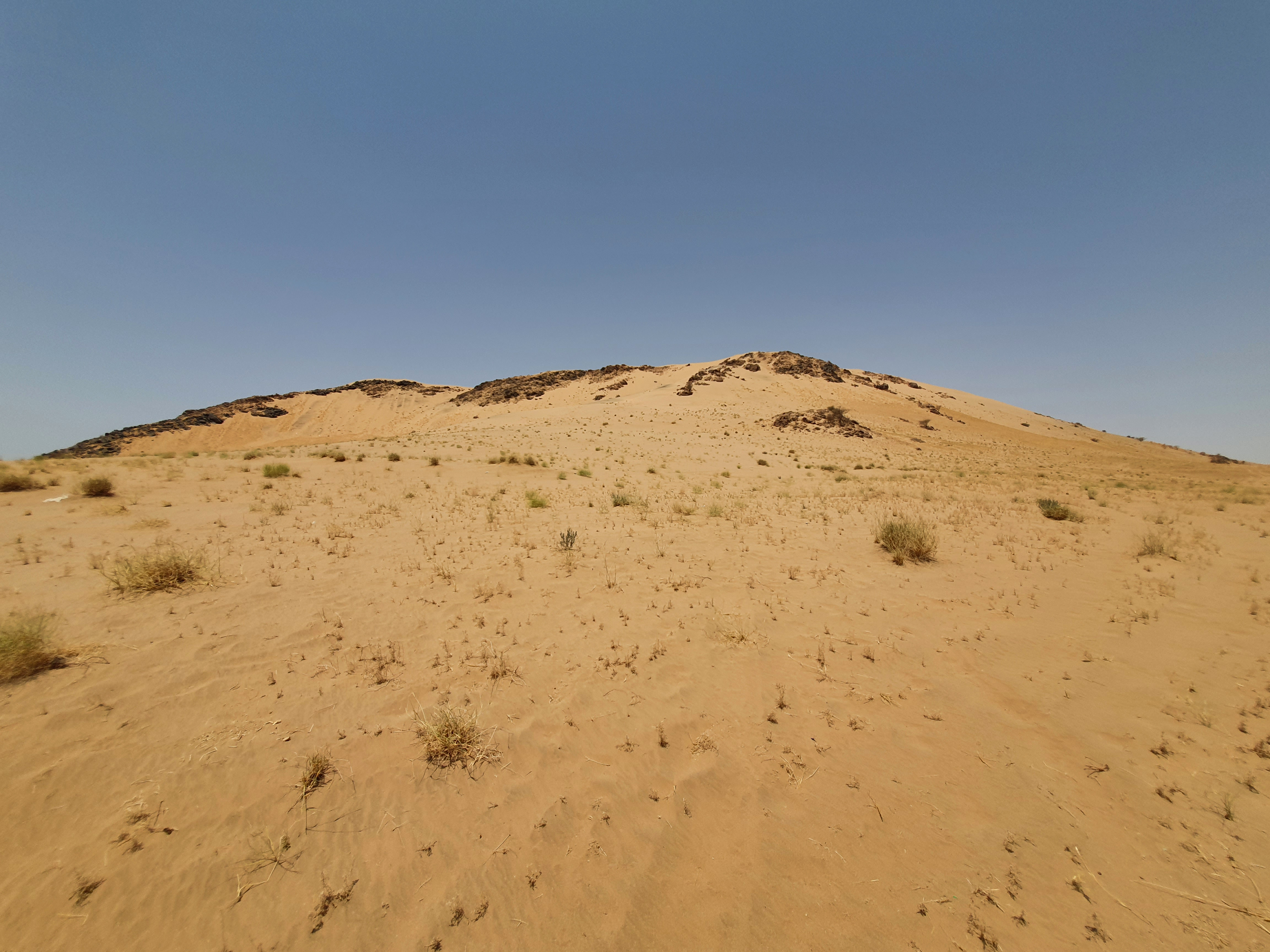
- Jabal al-Malaika

Highest point
- Elevation: 757 metres (2,484 ft)
- Coordinates: 23°48′30″N 38°45′57″E

Naming
- Native name: جبل الملائكة (Arabic)

Geography
- Location within Saudi Arabia Location within West and Central Asia
- Location: Badr, Hejaz, Saudi Arabia
- Province: Al Madinah Region

Jabal al-Malaika (Arabic: جبل الملائكة, romanized: Jabal al-Malāʾika, lit. 'Mountain of the angels') is a sand hill at Badr, in the Hejaz region of Saudi Arabia. It is 757 metres (2,484 ft) high and 1,964 metres (6,444 ft) long and was the site, where, according to Islam, angels came and assisted the prophet Muhammad and the early Muslims in the Battle of Badr, that was fought on 13 March 624 (17 Ramadan 2 AH).

== Battle of Badr ==
The battle was fought on March 13, 624 (17 Ramadan 2 AH) at the valley located in front of the hill. It occurred between a force from the Muslim community of Medina led by Muhammad, and a force led by Abu Jahl and others from Mecca. The battle was the first military encounter between the Meccans and the Muslims.

According to several hadiths and Quran verses, like Surah Al Imran and Sahih Muslim, Jabal e-Malaika was the hill that 3,000 angels, and later 5,000, were sent upon to help the Muslims win the battle. Jibreel led 500 angels from the right side, while Mikaeel led 500 other angels from the left side, eventually being replaced by Ali, who was sent by the prophet to lead those angels. According to Islamic sources, the help of the angels was a big part in the battle ending in a victory for the Muslims.

== Mosques ==
Bilal ibn Rabah Mosque
- مسجد بلال بن رباح
- Location in Saudi Arabia

Religion
- Affiliation: Islam
- Ecclesiastical or organisational status: Mosque
- Status: Active

Location
- Location: Badr, Al Madinah Region, Hejaz
- Country: Saudi Arabia
- Interactive map of Bilal ibn Rabah Mosque
- Administration: Saudi government
- Coordinates: 23°49′07″N 38°44′28″E

Architecture
- Style: Islamic
- Completed: 2019
- Minaret: 1

There are two mosques next to the hill, one being the Bilal ibn Rabah Mosque (Arabic: مسجد بلال بن رباح) and another unnamed one, around 500 metres (1,600 ft) away from the mosque dedicated to Bilal ibn Rabah.

== See also ==
- Middle East
- List of battles of Muhammad
- List of mosques in Saudi Arabia
- Badr, Medina Province
