= Dhu'l-Qa'da =

Eleventh month of the Islamic calendar

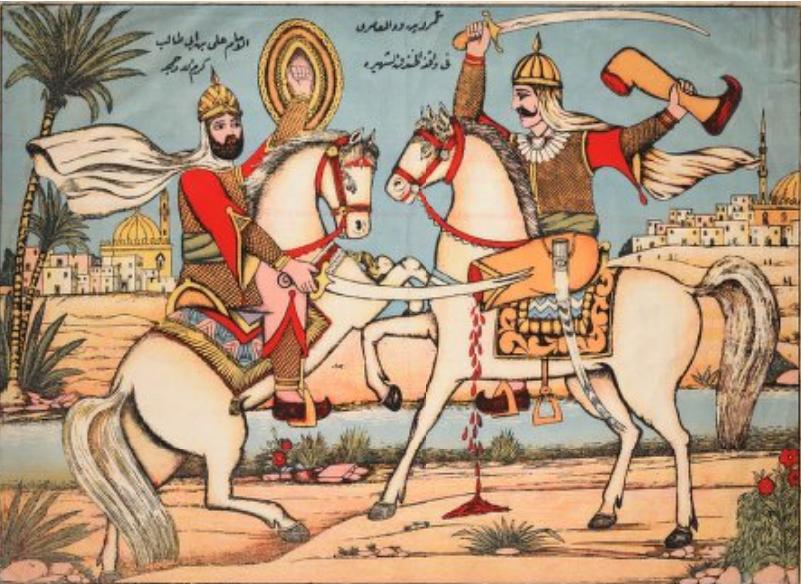
- Anachronistic painting of a combat between Ali ibn Abi Talib (left) and Amr ibn Abd al-Wud (right) during the Battle of the Trench
- Native name: ذُو ٱلْقَعْدَة (Arabic)
- Calendar: Islamic calendar
- Month number: 11
- Number of days: 29-30 (depends on actual observation of the moon's crescent)
- Significant days: Battle of the Trench; Treaty of Hudaybiya

Dhu'l-Qa'da (Note: Also spelled Dhu al-Qa'dah, Dhu al-Qa'da, Zu al-Qa'dah and many other variants. Historically also spelled Zilkadeh via Ottoman Turkish.) (Arabic: ذُو ٱلْقَعْدَة, Ḏū l-Qaʿda, IPA: [ðu‿l.qaʕ.da]) is the eleventh month in the Islamic calendar. It is one of the four sacred months in Islam during which warfare is prohibited, hence the name "Master of Truces". It could possibly mean "possessor or owner of the sitting and seating place" - the space occupied while sitting or the manner of the sitting, pose or posture.

== Transliteration ==
The most correct and most traditionally widespread pronunciation of the month's name according to the 13th-century Syrian jurist al-Nawawi is Dhu'l-Qa'da. Al-Nawawi also mentioned that a smaller group of linguists allowed the pronunciation Dhu'l-Qi'da, however.

== Timing ==
The Islamic calendar is a lunar calendar, and months begin when the first crescent of a new moon is sighted. Since the Islamic lunar calendar year is 11 to 12 days shorter than the tropical year, Dhu'l-Qa'da migrates throughout the seasons. The estimated start and end dates for Dhu'l-Qa'da, based on the Umm al-Qura calendar of Saudi Arabia, are:

Dhu'l-Qa'da dates between 2024 and 2028
AH	First day (CE/AD)	Last day (CE/AD)
1445	9 May 2024	6 June 2024
1446	29 April 2025	27 May 2025
1447	18 April 2026	17 May 2026
1448	9 April 2027	7 May 2027
1449	27 March 2028	25 April 2028

== Islamic events ==
- 5 AH, the Muslims took part in the Battle of the Trench.
- 6 AH, Truce of Hudaybiya.
- 6 AH, Pledge of the Tree.
- 7 AH, The first pilgrimage - the return to Mecca for the performance of Umrah by Muhammad and his companions.
- 1 Dhu'l-Qa'da, birth anniversary of Fatima bint Musa.
- 1 Dhu'l-Qa'da, Treaty of Hudaybiya.
- 8 Dhu'l-Qa'da, Hajj was made incumbent upon Muslims in 8 AH.
- 11 Dhu'l-Qa'da, birth anniversary of Imam Ali ibn Musa al-Rida, the eighth Twelver Imam.
- 23 Dhu'l-Qa'da, martyrdom of Imam Ali al-Rida according to one tradition.
- 25 Dhu'l-Qa'da, Arabic: يوم دحو الارض, the day earth was laid beneath the Ka'ba, and the birth date of Ibrahim and Jesus.
- 29 Dhu'l-Qa'da, martyrdom of Imam Muhammad ibn Ali at-Taqi al-Jawad, the ninth Twelver Imam.
