= Buhran =

Buhran is a location in Saudi Arabia. During the Islamic prophet Muhammad's era the Nakhla raid took place here.

== See also ==
- Invasion of Buhran
- List of expeditions of Muhammad
