= Nu'aym ibn Mas'ud =

Companion of Muhammad

Nuaym ibn Masud al-Ghatafani (Arabic: نعيم بن مسعود, romanized: Nuʿaym ibn Masʿūd al-Ghaṭafānī) was a companion of Muhammad hailing from Najd in the northern highlands of Arabia, belonging to the powerful Ghatafan tribe. His first exposure to Muhammad was when Abu Sufyan sent him to Medina to convince the Muslims not to fight the Qurayshi army by exaggerating their numbers. This was in regards to the second battle of Badr which had been agreed to by both parties at the Battle of Uhud.

== Biography ==
=== Battle of the Trench ===
During the Battle of the Trench he approached Muhammad professing his Islam and offering his services. He asked for permission to help with the war effort by using his position in his tribe. Muhammad responded "War is deception." Nuaym then came up with an efficient stratagem. He first went to the Banu Qurayza and warned them about the intentions of the rest of the Confederacy. If the siege fails, he said, the Confederacy will not be afraid to abandon the Jews, leaving them at the mercy of Muhammad. The Qurayza should thus demand Confederate leaders as hostages in return for cooperation. This advice touched upon the fears the Qurayza had already harbored.

Next Nuaym went to Abu Sufyan, the Confederate leader, warning him that the Qurayza had defected to Muhammad. He stated that the Jewish tribe intended to ask the Confederacy of hostages, ostensibly in return for cooperation, but really to hand over to Muhammad. Thus the Confederacy should not give a single man as hostage. Nuaym repeated the same message to other tribes in the Confederacy.

Nuaym's stratagem worked. After consulting, the Confederate leaders sent Ikrimah to the Qurayza, signalling a united invasion of Medina. The Qurayza, however, demanded hostages as a guarantee that the Confederacy would not desert them. The Confederacy, considering that the Qurayza might give the hostage to Muhammad, refused. Messages were repeatedly sent back and forth between the parties, but each held to its position stubbornly.

Abu Sufyan summoned Huyayy ibn Akhtab, informing him of Qurayza's response. Huyayy was taken aback, and Abu Sufyan branded him as a "traitor". Fearing for his life, Huyayy fled to the Qurayza's strongholds.

The Bedouins, the Ghatafan and other Confederates from Najd had already been compromised by Muhammad's negotiations. They had taken part in the expedition in hopes of plunder, rather than any particular prejudice against Islam. They lost hope as chances of success dwindled, uninterested in continuing the siege. The two confederate armies were marked by recriminations and mutual distrust.

The provisions of the Confederate armies were running out. Horses and camels were dying out of hunger and wounds. For days the weather had been exceptionally cold and wet. Violent winds blew out the camp fires, taking away from the Confederate army their source of heat. The Muslim camp, however, was sheltered from such winds. The enemy's tents were torn up, their fires were extinguished, the sand and rain beat in their faces, and they were terrified by the portents against them. They had already well nigh fallen out among themselves. During the night the Confederate armies withdrew, and by morning the ground was cleared of all enemy forces.
