= Badr, Medina Province =

Badr بدر
- City
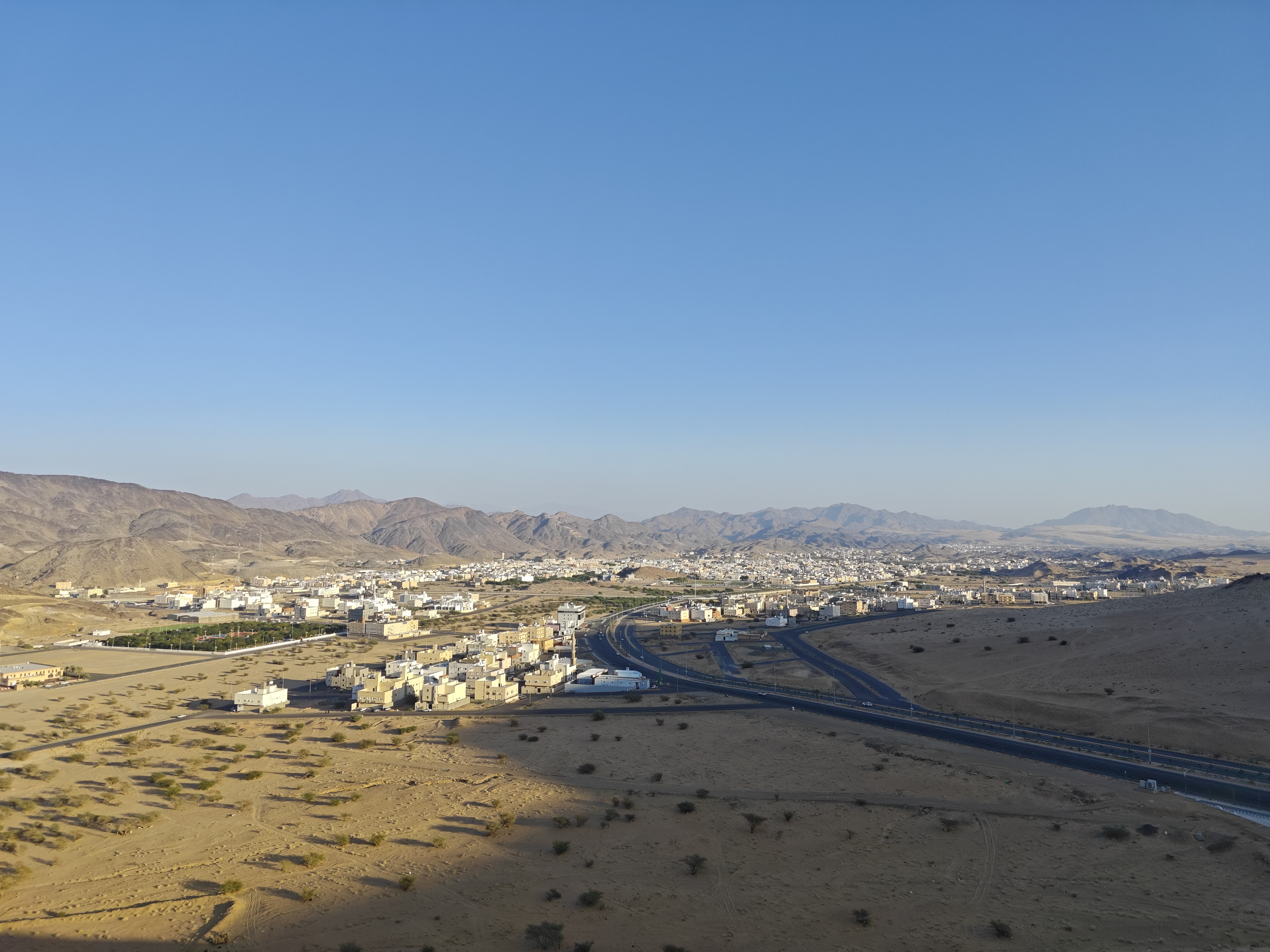

- Location in Saudi Arabia
- Coordinates: 23°46′48″N 38°47′24″E
- Country: Saudi Arabia
- Province: Medina Province

Population (2022)
  - Total: 30,494
- Time zone: UTC+03:00 (SAST)

Badr (Arabic: بدر) is a city in Badr Governorate, located in Medina Province, Saudi Arabia.

== Location ==
The city of Badr lies about 150 km southwest of Medina. It has an important strategic position, serving as a connecting point between Medina and Mecca through the regional road network.

== History ==
Badr was the location of the Battle of Badr, which took place on 17 Ramadan in the year 2 AH (624 CE). According to Islamic tradition, angels descended upon the mountains of Badr during the battle. Badr is an important site in Islam because of this battle in which the Muslims prevailed. The Battle of Badr is mentioned in the Qur’an, and the city attracts visitors interested in Muhammad and Islamic heritage.

=== Historical landmarks ===
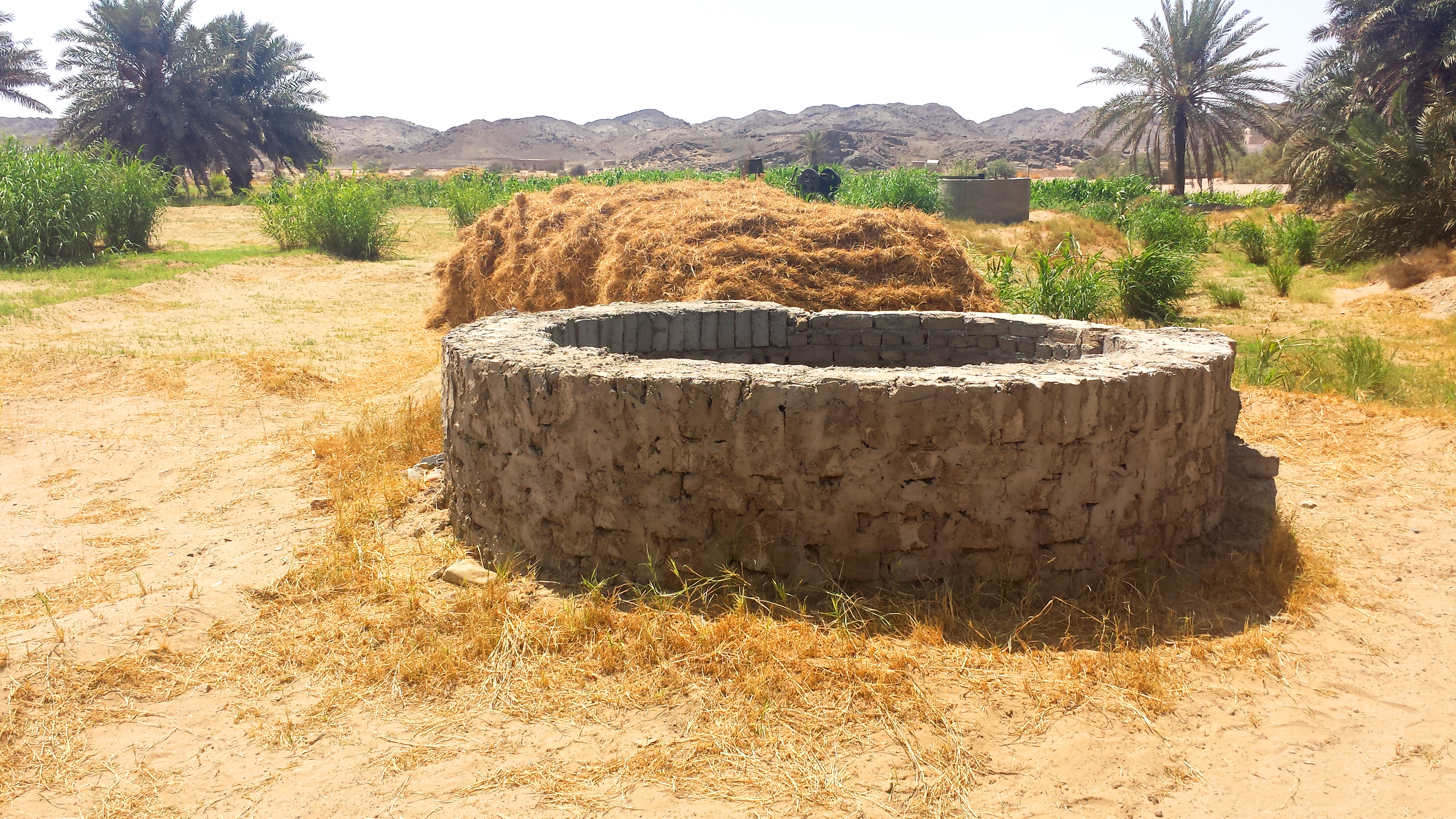
Badr Well

- Badr Well
- Al-Arish Mosque
- Jabal e-Malaika
- Cemetery of the Badr Martyrs
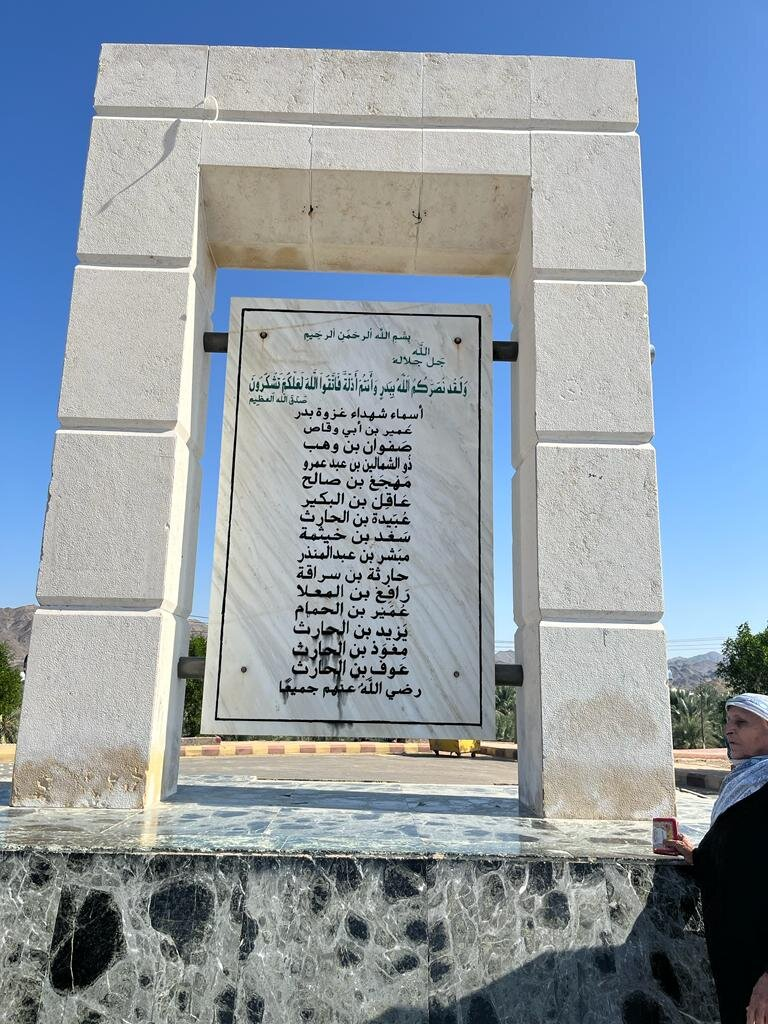
  Memorial to the Martyrs of Badr

== Etymology ==
The origin of the city's name is unclear. Some sources say that the name "Badr" comes from the shape of the surrounding terrain, as the city is encircled by mountains that give it a full-moon–like appearance. Some sources attribute the name to Badr ibn Yakhlud. It has also been said that the name refers to a well-known water source in the area.

== Population and administration ==
The city of Badr hosts the headquarters of Badr Governorate. The governorate is administratively part of the Emirate of Medina Province

== See also ==
- List of governorates of Saudi Arabia
- Hunayn, Saudi Arabia
- Muslim–Quraysh War
- Medina
