= Invasion of Buhran =

Part of Muhammad's campaigns in 624 CE

- Part of Muhammad's campaigns
Date	October – November 624 (3 AH)
Location	Madinah, Hejaz, Arabia
Result	Bloodless battle

Belligerents
First Islamic State	Banu Sulaym

Commanders and leaders
Muhammad	Unknown

Strength
300	Unknown

The Invasion of Buhran occurred in 3 A.H of the Islamic calendar of the 4th or 5th month. A report had arrived to the Muslims that a formidable force of the Banu Sulaym from Buhran were advancing on Madinah. The Islamic prophet Muhammad, took 300 men, to Hijaz reaching to Buhran, where the Banu Sulaym fled in panic.

Throughout the expedition, they did not meet any enemies, and no fighting took place. The expedition is regarded as a "patrolling invasion", according to Muslim scholar Saifur Rahman al-Mubarakpuri.

This event is mentioned in Ibn Hisham's biography of Muhammad and modern Islamic sources such as Ar-Raheeq Al-Makhtum by Saifur Rahman Al-Mubarakpuri.

== See also ==
- List of expeditions of Muhammad
