= Banu Shuja =

Banu Shuja (Arabic: بنو شجاع) was a tribe during the era of the Islamic prophet Muhammad. They participated in the Battle of the Trench.

They were part of the Juhaynah tribe. The Muslim scholar Tabari describes them as doughty fighters.

== See also ==
- List of battles of Muhammad
