= Nakhla (Saudi Arabia) =

Nakhlah نَخْلَة Wādī Nakhlah وَادِي نَخْلَة
- Location within Saudi Arabia Location within Middle East Location within Asia
- Country: Saudi Arabia
- Region: Makkah Region

Government
  - Mayor: Osama al-Bar
  - Provincial Governor: Khalid bin Faisal Al Saud
- Time zone: UTC+3 (AST)

Wādī Nakhlah (Arabic: وَادِي نَخْلَة) is an area in western Saudi Arabia between the cities of Mecca and Ta'if, which serves as a Miqat (Boundary) for the Islamic Ḥaram of Mecca.

== Description ==
During the era of the Islamic Prophet Muhammad, a successful military operation was carried out here, known as the "Nakhla Raid". The Nakhla Raid was the seventh caravan raid, and the first successful raid against the Meccans. It took place in Rajab 2 A.H. (January 624 C.E.). The commander was 'Abdullah ibn Jahsh al-Asadi, whom Muhammad dispatched to Nakhlah as the head of 12 Emigrants with six camels. (Note: This book contains a list of battles of Muhammad in Arabic, English translation available here "Archived copy". Archived from the original on 2011-07-26..)

== See also ==
- List of expeditions of Muhammad
  - Battle of Hunayn
- Arabian Peninsula
  - Sarat Mountains
    - Hijaz Mountains
