= Battle of the Trench =

Military campaign in early Muslim history, 627 CE

- Part of the Muslim–Quraysh War
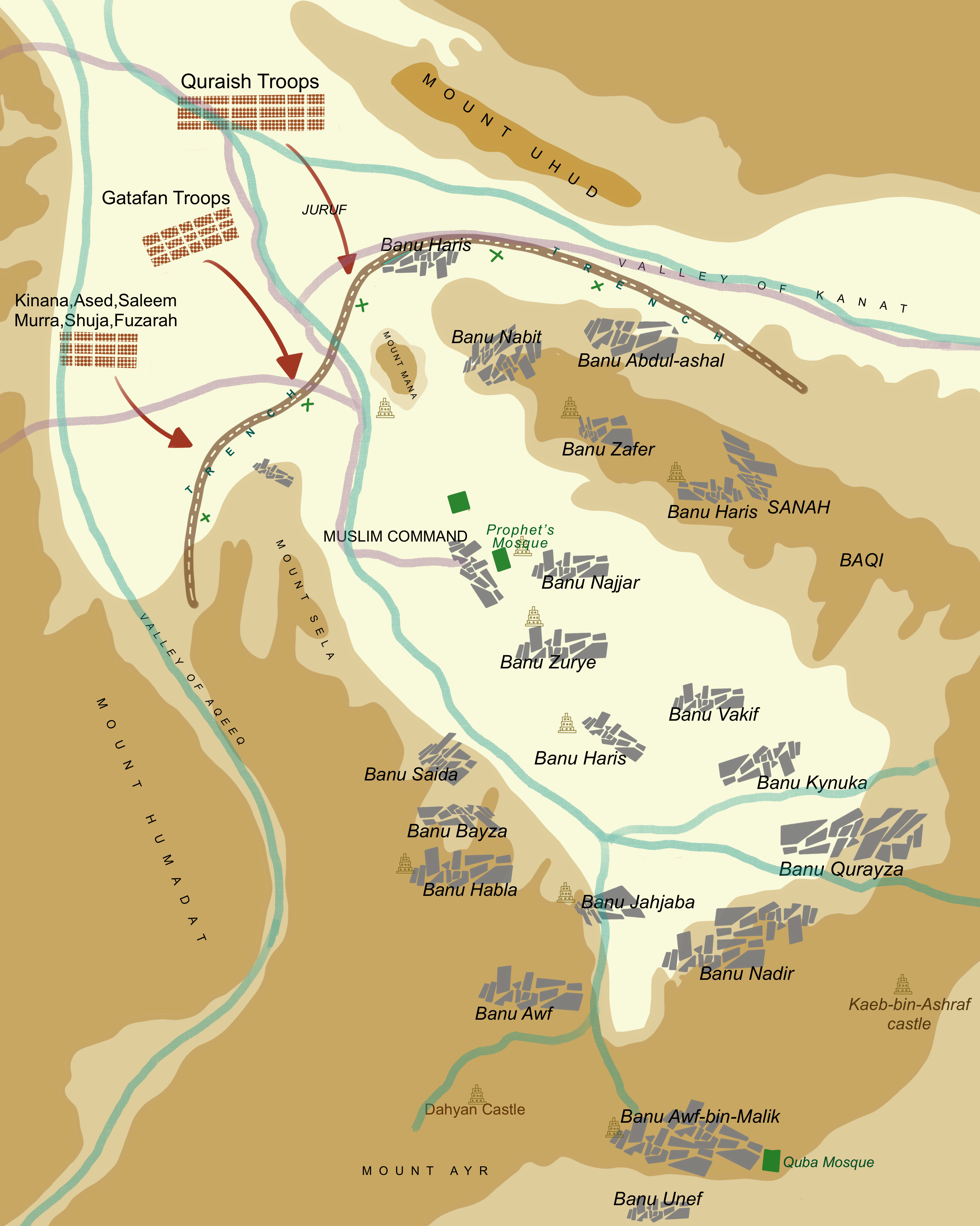
- Map of the Battle of the Trench
Date	31 March 627 – c. 14 April 627
Location	Surrounding perimeter of Medina 24°30′N 39°36′E
Result	Muslim victory: Beginning of the Siege of Banu Qurayza; Retreat of the confederates from Medina

Belligerents
First Islamic state; Ansars; Khazraj; Aws; Muhajirun; Khuza'ah	The Confederates; Quraysh; Banu Qurayza; Banu Nadir; Banu Ghatafan; Banu Murra; Banu Asad; Banu Shuja

Commanders and leaders
Muhammad; Ali ibn Abi Talib; Zubayr ibn al-Awwam; Umar ibn al-Khattab; Sa'd ibn Mu'adh †; Salman the Persian; Nu'aym ibn Mas'ud	Abu Sufyan; Amr ibn Abd al-Wud †; Ikrima ibn Amr; Dirar ibn al-Khattab; Tulayha ibn Khuwaylid; Huyayy ibn Akhtab; Safwan ibn Umayya

Strength
3,000	10,000; 7,500 (Watt's estimate) over 12,000 men (Asad)

Casualties and losses
6	3
- Location within Saudi Arabia

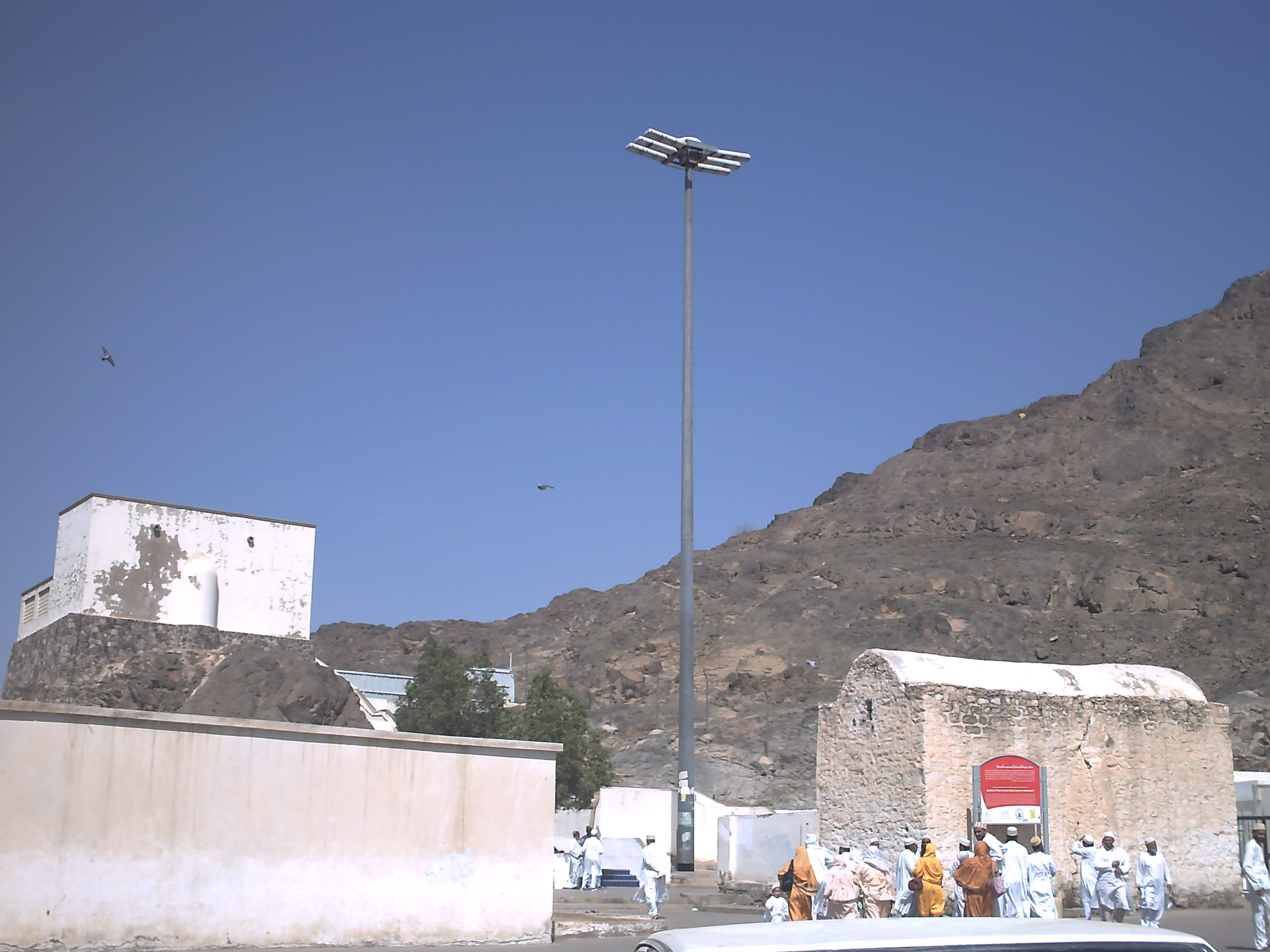
Site of the Battle of the Trench, Medina

The Battle of the Trench (Arabic: غزوة الخندق, romanized: Ghazwat al-Khandaq), also known as the Battle of Khandaq (Arabic: معركة الخندق, romanized: Maʿrakah al-Khandaq) and the Battle of the Confederates (Arabic: غزوة الاحزاب, romanized: Ghazwat al-Aḥzāb), was part of the conflict between the Muslims and the Quraysh. The Quraysh advanced towards the Muslims, who defended themselves in Medina by digging a trench around their settlement at the suggestion of Salman the Persian. The battle took place in 627 and lasted around two weeks, resulting in five to six casualties reported by the Muslim, and three casualties amongst the Quraysh.

The Quraysh launched an attack, but realized soon after that they had very limited military capability, being primarily merchants. This prompted negotiations with the Bedouins in order to get them to join the campaign. The Banu Nadir, whom Muhammad had previously expelled from Medina on account of an attempted assassination (crime against the state), were also part of this effort and offered the Bedouins half of their crops in Khaybar to persuade them to participate in attacking the Muslims. They reported to have gathered a confederate force of between 7,500 and 10,000 men, including Banu Ghatafan, Banu Sulaym, and Banu Asad.

Muhammad, having learned of the impending hostile advance from the Quraysh, took the advice of Salman the Persian to have his followers make a deep trench to impede the attackers' movement. When the Quraysh advanced, their unfamiliarity with this tactic caused them to struggle getting beyond the trench. Muhammad used this time to negotiate secretly with the Banu Ghatafan. After about two weeks, the weather deteriorated and the invading party withdrew.

Consequently, the Muslims retaliated against the Quraysh for this attack, and upon the latter's unconditional surrender, armed combatants were killed, with unarmed men, the elderly, women and children initially captured as prisoners of war and released upon the Islamic condition of Fidyah. Those unable to pay the Fidyah were released upon the condition of acting as literary teachers for 10 children.

The failed offensive caused the Meccans to lose their trade to Syria and much of their prestige.

== Name ==
The battle is named after the "Trench", or khandaq, that was dug by Muslims in preparation for the battle as an act of defense. The word khandaq (خَندَق) is the Arabised form of the Middle Persian word kandag (کندگ; meaning "that which has been dug"). Salman the Persian advised Muhammad to dig a trench around the city. The battle is also referred to as the Battle of Confederates (غزوة الاحزاب). The Qur'an uses the term confederates (الاحزاب) in Surah Al-Ahzab 33:9-32 to denote the confederacy of non-believers and Jews against Islam.

== Background ==
After their expulsion from Mecca, the Muslims fought the Meccan Quraysh at the Battle of Badr in 624, and at the Battle of Uhud in 625. Although the Muslims were defeated at the Battle of Uhud, their strength was gradually growing. In April 626 Muhammad raised a force of 300 men and 10 horses to meet the Quraysh army of 1,000 at Badr, where the latter had threatened to attack. Although no fighting occurred, the coastal tribes were impressed with Muslim power. Muhammad also tried, with limited success, to break up many confederacies against Muslims. Nevertheless, he was unable to prevent the Meccan one.

== The Confederates ==
Early in 627, leaders of the exiled Banu Nadir, including Huyayy ibn Akhtab, traveled from Khaybar to Mecca to forge a military alliance with the Quraysh aimed at eliminating the Muslim community in Medina.

The Banu Nadir began rousing the nomads of Najd. The Nadir enlisted the Banu Ghatafan by paying them half of their harvest. This contingent, the second-largest, added a strength of about 2,000 men and 300 horsemen led by Uyayna ibn Hisn al-Fazari. The Banu Asad also agreed to join, led by Tulayha. From the Banu Sulaym, the Nadir secured 700 men, though this force would likely have been much larger had not some of its leaders been sympathetic towards Islam. The Banu Amir, who had a pact with Muhammad, refused to join.

Other tribes included the Banu Murra, with 400 men led by Hars ibn Auf Murri, and the Banu Shuja, with 700 men led by Sufyan ibn Abd Shams. In total, the strength of the Confederate armies, though not agreed upon by scholars, is estimated to have included around 10,000 men and six hundred horsemen. In December 626 the army, which was led by Abu Sufyan, marched on Medina.

In accordance with the plan, the armies began marching towards Medina, Meccans from the south (along the coast), and the others from the east. At the same time, horsemen from the Banu Khuza'a left to warn Medina of the invading army.

== Muslim defense ==
The men from Banu Khuza'a reached Muhammad in four days, warning him of the Confederate armies that were to arrive in a week. Muhammad gathered the Medinans to discuss the best strategy of overcoming the enemy. Meeting the enemy in the open (which led to victory at Badr), and waiting for them inside the city (a lesson learned from the defeat at Uhud) were both suggested. Ultimately, the outnumbered Muslims opted to engage in a defensive battle by digging deep trenches to act as a barrier. Since Medina already possessed numerous fortress-like houses and rocks in its surroundings, acting as a natural defense, the trench was only dug at certain places. The longest continuous stretch was made on the northern front.

The tactic of a defensive trench was introduced by Salman the Persian. Every capable Muslim in Medina including Muhammad contributed to digging the massive trench in six days. The ditch was dug on the northern side only, as the rest of Medina was surrounded by rocky mountains and trees, impenetrable to large armies (especially cavalry). The digging of the ditch coincided with a near-famine in Medina. Women and children were moved to the inner city. The Medinans harvested all their crops early, so the Confederate armies would have to rely on their own food reserves.

Muhammad established his military headquarters at the hillock of Sala' and the army was arrayed there; this position would give the Muslims an advantage if the enemy crossed the trench.

The final army that defended the city from the invasion consisted of 3,000 men, and included all inhabitants of Medina over the age of 14, except the Banu Qurayza (the Qurayza did, however, supply the Muslims with some instruments for digging the trench).

According to Irfan Shahid, the Muslims adopted the tactic of using trenches from the Persians, possibly via the Ghassanid Arabs who saw their king killed at the Battle of Thannuris in 527 by this tactic. The adopting is reflected in the Arabic word for this battle, khandaq (خندق), which is a borrowing via Aramaic from Pahlavi kandak.

== Siege of Medina ==
The siege of Medina began in January 627 and lasted for 20 nights. Adding in the six days of trench-building, the entire operation lasted 27 days and was contained within a single month (5 Shawwal – 1 Dhu'l-Qa'da). Since sieges were uncommon in Arabian warfare, the arriving Confederates were unprepared to deal with the trenches dug by the Muslims. The Confederates tried to attack with horsemen in hopes of forcing a passage, but the Medinans were rigidly entrenched, preventing such a crossing. Both of the armies gathered on either side of the trench and spent two or three weeks exchanging insults in prose and verse, backed up with arrows fired from a comfortable distance. According to Rodinson, there were three dead among the attackers and five among the defenders. On the other hand, the harvest had been gathered and the besiegers had some trouble finding food for their horses, which proved of no use to them in the attack.

The Confederate army made several other attempts to cross the trench during the night but repeatedly failed. Although the confederates could have deployed their infantry over the whole length of the trench, they were unwilling to engage the Muslims at the close-quarter as the former regarded the latter as superior in hand-to-hand fighting. As the Muslim army was well dug-in behind the embankment made from the earth which had been taken from the ditch and prepared to bombard attackers with stones and arrows, any attack could cause great casualties.

=== Banu Qurayza ===
The Confederates attempted several simultaneous attacks, in particular by trying to persuade the Banu Qurayza to attack the Muslims from the south. From the Confederates, Huyayy ibn Akhtab, a Khaybarian, the leader of the exiled tribe Banu Nadir, returned to Medina seeking their support against the Muslims.

So far the Banu Qurayza had tried their best to remain neutral, and were very hesitant about joining the Confederates since they had earlier made a pact with Muhammad. When Huyayy approached them, their leader refused to allow him entry.

Huyayy eventually managed to enter and persuade them that the Muslims would surely be overwhelmed. The sight of the vast Confederate armies, surging over the land with soldiers and horses as far as the eye could see, swung the Qurayza opinion in the favor of the Confederacy.

News of the Qurayza's renunciation of the pact with Muhammad leaked out, and Umar promptly informed Muhammad. Such suspicions were reinforced by the movement of enemy troops towards the strongholds of the Qurayza. Muhammad became anxious about their conduct, and realised the grave potential danger the Qurayza posed. Because of his pact with the Qurayza, he had not bothered to make defensive preparations along the Muslims' border with the tribe. The Qurayza also possessed weaponry: 1,500 swords, 2,000 lances, 300 suits of armour, and 500 shields.

Muhammad sent three leading Muslims to bring him details of the recent developments. He advised the men to openly declare their findings, should they find the Banu Qurayza to be kind, so as to increase the morale of the Muslim fighters. However, he warned against spreading the news of a possible breach of the pact on the Qurayza's part, so as to avoid any panic within Muslim ranks.

The leaders found that the pact had indeed been renounced and tried in vain to convince the Qurayza to revert by reminding them of the fate of the Banu Nadir and Banu Qaynuqa at the hands of Muhammad. The findings of the leaders were signaled to Muhammad in a metaphor: "Adal and Qarah". Because the people of Adal and Qarah had betrayed the Muslims and killed them at the opportune moment, Maududi believes the metaphor means the Qurayza were thought to be about to do the same.

=== Crisis in Medina ===
Muhammad attempted to hide his knowledge of the activities of Banu Qurayza; however, rumors soon spread of a massive assault on the city of Medina from Qurayza's side which severely demoralized the Medinans.

The Muslims found themselves in greater difficulties by day. Food was running short, and nights were colder. The lack of sleep made matters worse. So tense was the situation that, for the first time, the canonical daily prayers were neglected by the Muslim community. Only at night, when the attacks stopped due to darkness, could they resume their regular worship. According to Ibn Ishaq, the situation became serious and fear was everywhere.

=== Muslim response ===
Immediately after hearing the rumors about the Qurayza, Muhammad had sent 100 men to the inner city for its protection. Later he sent 300 horsemen (cavalry was not needed at the trench) as well to protect the city. The loud voices, in which the troops prayed every night, created the illusion of a large force.

The crisis showed Muhammad that many of his men had reached the limits of their endurance. He sent word to Ghatafan, trying to pay for their defection and offering them a third of Medina's date harvest if they withdrew. Although the Ghatafan demanded half, they eventually agreed to negotiate with Muhammad on those terms. Before Muhammad began the order of drafting the agreement, he consulted the Medinan leaders. They sharply rejected the terms of the agreement, protesting Medina had never sunk to such levels of ignominy. The negotiations were broken off. While the Ghatafan did not retreat they had compromised themselves by entering into negotiations with Medina, and the Confederacy's internal dissension had thereby been increased.

At about that point, Muhammad received a visit from Nu'aym ibn Mas'ud, an Arab leader who was well-respected by the entire confederacy, but who had, unknown to them, secretly converted to Islam. Muhammad asked him to end the siege by creating discord amongst Confederates.

Nu'aym then came up with an efficient stratagem. He first went to the Banu Qurayza and warned them about the intentions of the rest of the Confederacy. He said that if the siege failed, the Confederacy would not be afraid to abandon the Jews, leaving them at the mercy of Muhammad. The Qurayza should therefore demand Confederate leaders as hostages in return for cooperation. This advice touched upon the fears the Qurayza had already harbored.

Next Nu'aym went to Abu Sufyan, the Confederate leader, warning him that the Qurayza had defected to Muhammad. He stated that the tribe intended to ask the Confederacy for hostages, ostensibly in return for cooperation, but really to hand over to Muhammad. Thus the Confederacy should not give a single man a hostage. Nu'aym repeated the same message to other tribes in the Confederacy.

=== Collapse of the Confederacy ===
Nu'aym's stratagem worked. After consulting, the Confederate leaders sent Ikrima ibn Amr to the Qurayza, signaling a united invasion of Medina. The Qurayza, however, demanded hostages as a guarantee that the Confederacy would not desert them. The Confederacy, considering that the Qurayza might give the hostages to Muhammad, refused. Messages were repeatedly sent back and forth between the parties, but each held to its position stubbornly.

Abu Sufyan summoned Huyayy ibn Akhtab, informing him of Qurayza's response. Huyayy was taken aback, and Abu Sufyan branded him as a "traitor". Fearing for his life, Huyayy fled to the Qurayza's strongholds.

The Bedouins, the Ghatafan, and other Confederates from Najd had already been compromised by Muhammad's negotiations. They had taken part in the expedition in hopes of plunder, rather than for personal reasons. They lost hope as chances of success dwindled, uninterested in continuing the siege. The two confederate armies were marked by recriminations and mutual distrust.

The provisions of the Confederate armies were running out. Horses and camels were dying of hunger and wounds. For days the weather had been exceptionally cold and wet. Violent winds blew out the campfires, taking away from the Confederate army their source of heat. The Muslim camp, however, was sheltered from such winds. The enemy's tents were torn up, their fires were extinguished, the sand and rain beat in their faces and they were terrified by the portents against them. They had already well nigh fallen out among themselves. During the night the Confederate armies withdrew, and by morning the ground was cleared of all enemy forces.

== Aftermath ==
Following the retreat of the Confederate army, the Banu Qurayza neighborhoods were besieged by the Muslims. After a 25-day siege of their neighborhood, the Banu Qurayza unconditionally surrendered. When the Banu Qurayza tribe surrendered, the Muslim army seized their stronghold and their possessions for their acts. On the request of the Banu Aws, who were allied to the Qurayza, Muhammad chose one of them, Sa'd ibn Mu'adh, as an arbitrator to pronounce judgment upon them. Sa'd, who later died of his wounds from the battle, decreed the sentence, in which some of the men fighters shall be killed and some of their women and children enslaved. Muhammad approved of this decision, and the next day the sentence was carried out.

The men – numbering between 400 and 900, according to Ibn Ishaq – were bound and placed under the custody of Muhammad ibn Maslamah, while the women and children were placed under Abd Allah ibn Salam, a former rabbi who had converted to Islam.

A lot of scholars have however cast doubt on ibn Ishaq's account and there is no reliable hadith about the exact number of people killed, leading some to argue only prominent ones were executed. A number of individuals were spared when various Muslims intervened on their behalf. According to Ibn Ishaq's biography of Muhammad, one woman was also beheaded along with the men. Several accounts note Muhammad's companions as executioners, Umar and Zubayr ibn al-Awwam in particular, and that each clan of the Aws was also charged with killing a group of Qurayza men.

Ibn Asakir writes in his History of Damascus that the Banu Kilab, a clan of Arab clients of the Banu Qurayza, were also killed though this is not accepted by the majority of traditional Islamic historians.

The spoils of battle, including the enslaved women and children of the tribe, were divided up among the Muslims that had participated in the siege and among the emigrees from Mecca (who had hitherto depended on the help of the Muslims native to Medina).

As part of his share of the spoils, Muhammad selected one of the women, Rayhana, for himself and took her as part of his booty. Muhammad offered to free and marry her and according to some sources she accepted his proposal, while according to others she rejected it and remained Muhammad's companion. She is said to have later become a Muslim.

Scholars argue that Muhammad had already decided upon this judgment before the Qurayza's surrender and that Sa'd was putting his allegiance to the Muslim community above that to his tribe. One reason cited by some for such punishment is that Muhammad's previous clemency towards defeated foes was in contradiction to Arab and Jewish laws of the time, and was seen as a sign of weakness. Others see the punishment as a response to what was perceived as an act of treason by the Qurayza since they betrayed their joint defense pact with Muhammad by giving aid and comfort to the enemies of the Muslims.

== Implications ==
The failure of the siege marked the beginning of Muhammad's inevitable ascendency in the city of Medina. The Meccans had exerted their utmost strength to dislodge Muhammad from Medina, and this defeat caused them to lose their trade with Syria and much of their prestige with it. Watt conjectures that the Meccans at this point began to contemplate that conversion to Islam would be the most prudent option.

== Islamic sources ==
Apart from being mentioned in the Qur'an, the incident is also found in historical works by writers of the third and fourth century of the Muslim era. These include the traditional Muslim biographies of Muhammad, and quotes attributed to him (the sira and hadith literature), which provide further information on Muhammad's life. The earliest surviving written sira (biographies of Muhammad and quotes attributed to him) is Ibn Ishaq's Life of God's Messenger written some 120 to 130 years after Muhammad's death. Although the original work is lost, portions of it survive in the recensions of Ibn Hisham and Al-Tabari. Another early source is the history of Muhammad's campaigns by al-Waqidi (d. 823).

== See also ==
- List of battles of Muhammad
- Muslim–Quraysh War
- Islamic military jurisprudence
- Wall of the Arabs, known as the Khandaq of Shapur in Arabic

== Bibliography ==
- Ibn Kathir (2003). Tafsir Ibn Kathir (Abridged). Vol. 7. Darussalam. ISBN 978-9960-892-78-8.
- Buhl, F.; Welch, A.T. (1993). "Muḥammad". Encyclopaedia of Islam. Vol. 7 (2nd ed.). Brill. ISBN 978-90-04-09419-2.
- Caskel, W. (1986). "Asad, Banu". Encyclopaedia of Islam. Vol. 1 (2nd ed.). Brill. ISBN 978-90-04-08114-7.
- Donner, Fred (1998). Narratives of Islamic Origins: The Beginnings of Islamic Historical Writing. Darwin Press. ISBN 0-87850-127-4.
- Gabriel, Richard A. (22 October 2014). Muhammad: Islam's First Great General. University of Oklahoma Press. ISBN 978-0-8061-8250-6.
- Gil, Moshe (1997). A History of Palestine, 634-1099. Cambridge University Press. ISBN 978-0-521-40437-2.
- Glasse, Cyril; Smith, Huston (2003). New Encyclopedia of Islam: A Revised Edition of the Concise Encyclopedia of Islam. Rowman Altamira. ISBN 0759101906.
- Glubb, Sir John Bagot (2001). The Life and Times of Muhammad. Cooper Square Press. ISBN 978-0-8154-1176-5.
- Hazleton, Lesley (4 February 2014). The First Muslim: The Story of Muhammad. Penguin. ISBN 978-1-59463-230-3.
- Heck, Gene W. (2003). "Arabia Without Spices: An Alternate Hypothesis". Journal of the American Oriental Society. 123: 547–567. doi:10.2307/3217750. JSTOR 3217750.
- Hoyland, Robert G. (2015). In God's Path: The Arab Conquests and the Creation of an Islamic Empire. Oxford University Press. ISBN 978-0-19-991636-8.
- Hoyland, Robert G. (2017). In God's Path: The Arab Conquests and the Creation of an Islamic Empire. Ancient Warfare and Civilization. Oxford, New York: Oxford University Press. ISBN 978-0-19-061857-5.
- Inamdar, Subhash C. (2001). Muhammad and the Rise of Islam: The Creation of Group Identity. Psychosocial Press. ISBN 978-1-887841-28-3.
- Khan, Muhammad Zafrulla (1980). Muhammad, Seal of the Prophets. Routledge. ISBN 0-7100-0610-1.
- Karsh, Efraim (2013). Islamic Imperialism: A History. Yale University Press. ISBN 978-0-300-20133-8.
- Kister, Meir Jacob (1986). "The massacre of the Banū Qurayẓa: a re-examination of a tradition". Jerusalem Studies in Arabic and Islam. 8: 61–96.
- Lapidus, Ira M. (2012). Islamic Societies to the Nineteenth Century: A Global History. Cambridge University Press. ISBN 978-0-521-51441-5.
- Lecker, Michael (1995). "On Arabs of the Banū Kilāb executed together with the Banū Qurayza". JSAI. 19: 66–72.
- Lewis, Bernard (2002). The Arabs in History. Oxford, New York: Oxford University Press. ISBN 978-0-19-280310-8.
- Lings, Martin (1983). Muhammad: his life based on the earliest sources. Allen & Unwin. ISBN 0-04-297042-3.
- Maududi, Sayyid Abul Ala (1967). The Meaning of the Qur'an (book)|The Meaning of the Quran. Vol. 10. Lahore: Islamic Publications Limited. ISBN 1-56744-134-3.
- Muir, William (1861). A Life of Mahomet and History of Islam to the Era of the Hegira. London: Smith, Elder & Co.
- Nomani, Shibli (1970). Sirat al-Nabi. Karachi: Pakistan Historical Society.
- Peters, Francis E. (1994). Muhammad and the Origins of Islam. Albany: SUNY Press. ISBN 0-7914-1875-8.
- Peterson, Daniel C. (26 February 2007). Muhammad, Prophet of God. Grand Rapids, Michigan: Wm. B. Eerdmans Publishing. ISBN 978-0-8028-0754-0.
- Ramadan, Tariq (2007). In the Footsteps of the Prophet. New York: Oxford University Press. ISBN 978-0-19-530880-8.
- Reeves, Minou (2003). Muhammad in Europe: A Thousand Years of Western Myth-Making. NYU Press. ISBN 978-0-8147-7564-6.
- Rodgers, Russ (2012). The Generalship of Muhammad: Battles and Campaigns of the Prophet of Allah. University Press of Florida. ISBN 978-0-8130-3766-0.
- Rodinson, Maxime (2002). Muhammad: Prophet of Islam. Tauris Parke Paperbacks. ISBN 1-86064-827-4.
- Rodinson, Maxime (2 March 2021). Muhammad. New York Review of Books. ISBN 978-1-68137-493-2.
- Shahid, Irfan (1995). Byzantium and the Arabs in the Sixth Century. Dumbarton Oaks. ISBN 978-0-88402-214-5.
- Sharkey, Heather J. (2017). A History of Muslims, Christians, and Jews in the Middle East. Cambridge University Press. ISBN 978-0-521-76937-2.
- Spellberg, Denise A. (1994). Politics, Gender, and the Islamic Past: The Legacy of 'A'isha Bint Abi Bakr. Columbia University Press. ISBN 978-0-231-07999-0.
- Stillman, Norman A. (2010). The Jews of Arab lands: a history and source book (Nachdr ed.). Philadelphia: Jewish Publ. Soc. of America. ISBN 978-0-8276-0198-7.
- Watt, William M. (1953). Muhammad at Mecca. Oxford University Press.
- Watt, William M. (1956). Muhammad at Medina. Oxford University Press.
- Watt, William M. (1961). Muhammad: Prophet and Statesman. Oxford University Press. (An abridgement of Muhammad at Mecca and Muhammad at Medina)
- Watt, William M. (1986). "Kurayza, Banu". Encyclopaedia of Islam. Brill. ISBN 978-90-04-07819-2.
- Ibn Ishaq, Muhammad (1955). The Life of Muhammad: A Translation of Ibn Ishaq's Sirat Rasul Allah. Translated by Guillaume, Alfred. Oxford University Press.
- Gabriel, Richard A. (2007). Muhammad: Islam's First Great General. University Of Oklahoma Press. ISBN 978-0806138602.
- Ibrahim, Ayman S. (2025). Muhammad's Military Expeditions: A Critical Reading in Original Muslim Sources. Oxford University Press. ISBN 978-0-19-776919-5.
