= Waqid ibn Abdullah =

Sahabah

Waqid ibn Abdullah was a companion of Muhammad who participated in the Nakhla Raid during Muhammad's era. He was the first person to kill someone in the name of Islam. While the Quraysh were busy preparing food during the Nakhla Raid, the Muslims attacked. In the short battle that took place, Waqid ibn Abdullah killed Amr ibn Hadrami by shooting an arrow at the leader of the Quraysh caravan. The Muslims captured two Quraysh tribe members. Nawfal ibn Abdullah managed to escape. The Muslims took Uthman ibn Abdullah and al-Hakam ibn Kaysan as captives. Abdullah ibn Jahsh returned to Medina with the booty and with the two prisoners. The followers planned to give one-fifth of the booty to Muhammad.

== See also ==
- List of expeditions of Muhammad
