= Amr ibn Abd al-Wud =

Champion of Quraish

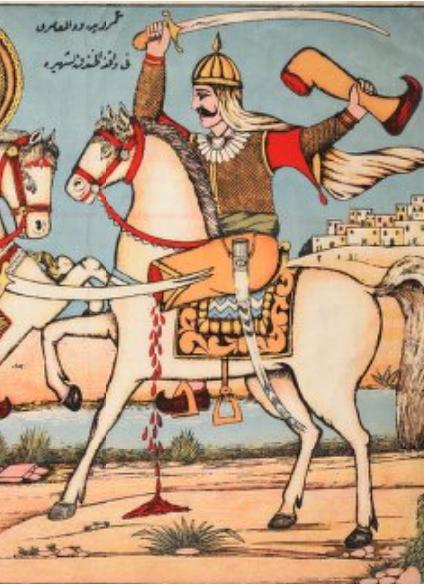
Detail of a painting depicting Amr Bin Al-Wud during the Battle of the Trench

Amr ibn Abd Wadd (Arabic: عَمْرُو بْنُ عَبْدِ وَدّ) was a champion of the Quraish tribe. He is most well known for his role during the Battle of the Trench in which he was killed in a duel by Ali ibn Abi Talib.

== Battle of the Trench ==
During the Battle of the Trench in 627 CE, the Quraysh veterans grew impatient with the deadlock. A group of militants led by ‘Amr ibn ‘Abd Wadd and Ikrimah ibn Abi Jahl attempted to thrust through the trench and managed to effect a crossing, occupying a marshy area near the hillock of Sala. 'Amr challenged the Muslims to a duel. Ali volunteered to go, but the prophet told him not to, as Amr was known to be as powerful as 1000 men. But when Ali continued to insist, the prophet gave him permission. Ali accepted the challenge, but Amr did not want to fight the young man. Nonetheless, the duel commenced. Both the fighters got lost in the dust as the duel became intense. When Ali got Amr to the floor he said as leaders you are meant to accept challenges, one is to become Muslim and the second is to carry on fighting him. Finally, the soldiers heard scream(s) which hinted decisive blows, but it was unclear which of the two was successful. From the cloud of dust, a cry came drifting to the ears of the observers; Allahu Akbar, God is the greatest. The confederates were forced to withdraw in a state of panic and confusion. Although the Confederates lost only three men during the encounter, they failed to accomplish anything important.

According to Joel Hayward, "it is reported "During the Battle of Khandaq in 627... Ali ibn Abi Talib (who later served as Caliph) reportedly subjugated Amr ibn Abd Wadd, a powerful warrior of the Quraysh. Ali was about to deal a death blow when his enemy spat in his face. Ali immediately released him and walked away. He then rejoined battle and managed to slay his enemy."
