= First Expedition to Badr =

623 historical campaign by Muhammad

The First Expedition to Badr (Arabic: غزوة سفوان ghazwa Safawān) or the Preliminary Badr Invasion occurred in year 2 AH of the Islamic calendar, in Rabi ul Awal (September 623). Kurz ibn Jabir al-Fihri raided Muslim territory and stole pasturing camels belonging to Madinah. The Islamic prophet Muhammad was a three days distance away. Muhammad mobilized 70 men. By the time Muhammad reached the valley of Safawan, al-Fihri fled.

== See also ==
- List of expeditions of Muhammad
