= Sacred months =

Four forbidden months of the Islamic calendar

In the Islamic religion, the sacred months or inviolable months include Dhu'l-Qa'da, Dhu'l-Hijja, Muharram and Rajab, the four months of the Islamic calendar during which war is considered forbidden except in response to aggression. Al-Shafi'i and many of scholars went to the fatwa of the deceased during the sacred months. The purpose of that tradition was to enable pilgrims, merchants, and others to go to markets or places of worship and return home safely.

== Before Islam ==
The sacred months were important in the law of Abraham, and the Arabs forbade fighting. This continued until the Arabs began to use the nasi' in their calendar, which led to the absence of sacred months in some years. This was mentioned in the Quran in the form of denial and prohibition: "Indeed, the postponing [of restriction within sacred months] is an increase in disbelief by which those who have disbelieved are led [further] astray. They make it lawful one year and unlawful another year to correspond to the number made unlawful by Allah and [thus] make lawful what Allah has made unlawful. Made pleasing to them is the evil of their deeds; and Allah does not guide the disbelieving people." [Qur'an 9:37]

In Arabic, the word for postponing is "nasi'". The verse, in Arabic, also uses this word.

== In Islam ==
Islamic traditions magnify these months and forbid Muslims from violating them.

=== In the Quran ===
These months are mentioned in the Quran: "Verily, the number of months with Allah is twelve months (in a year), so was it ordained by Allah on the Day when He created the heavens and the earth; of them four are sacred. That is the right religion, so wrong not yourselves therein, and fight against the Mushrikin (idolaters) collectively as they fight against you collectively. But know that Allah is with those who have Taqwa". (Quran 9:36)

Of the verse, "Do not wrong yourselves", Qatada said: "The injustice in the sacred months is a greater sin and a source of injustice than in others, although injustice is a great sin anyway, but God magnifies what he wants." He said: "God chose Safaya from his creation, chose messengers from angels, messengers from people, and chose mosques from the land, and chose the months of Ramadan and the sacred months, from months, and chose Friday from the days, and chose night of power from the nights.

=== In the prophetic Sunnah ===
The Islamic prophet Muhammad said of these months in his Hadith: "Truly the time has circulated to its form on the day God created the heavens and the earth, the twelve months, including four sanctuaries; three of them sequential: Dhu'l-Qa'da, Dhu'l-Hijja and Muharram, as well as Rajab Mudar, between Jumada and Sha'ban."
