= Salman the Persian =

Companion of the Islamic prophet Muhammad

- سلمان فارسی سَلْمَان ٱلْفَارِسِيّ
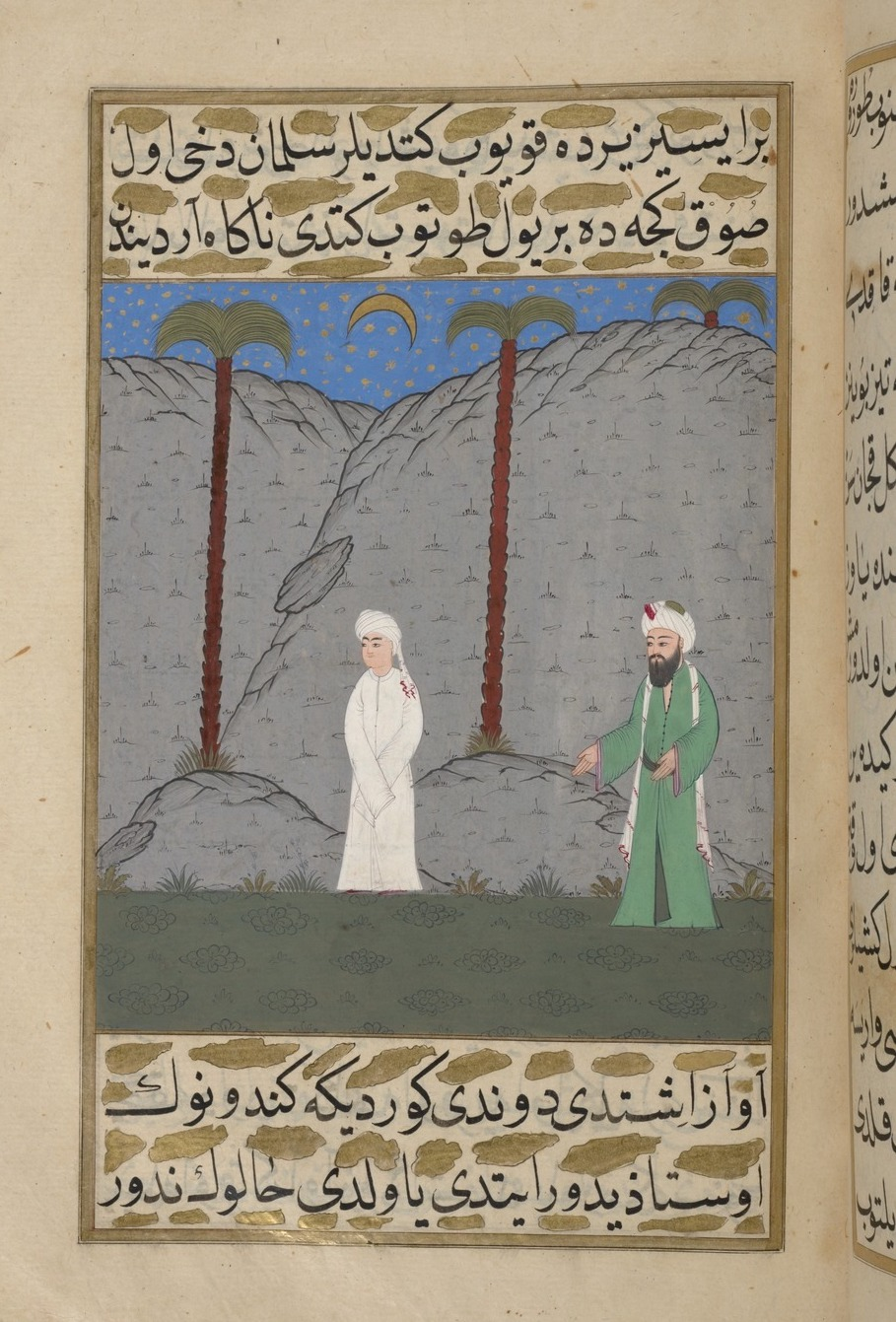
- Depiction of Salman's father banishing him from Persia for renouncing Zoroastrianism, c. 1595
- Born: Rozbih Khwashbudhan (Note: Persian: روزبه خشبوذان, romanized: Rōzbih Xwašbūḏān) or Rozbih Budhakhshan (Note: Persian: روزبه بوذخشان, romanized: Rōzbih Būḏaxšān) c. 568 CE; Isfahan, Sasanian Empire
- Died: c. 655 or 656 CE; Al-Mada'in, Rashidun Caliphate
- Resting place: Mosque of Salman al-Farsi in Salman Pak, Iraq
- Known for: Being one of Muhammad's companions
- Works: Partial translation of the Quran into the Persian language

'Salman Farsi (Note: Persian: سلمان فارسی, romanized: Salmān Fārsī; Arabic: سَلْمَان ٱلْفَارِسِيّ, romanized: Salmān al-Fārisiyy) (born Rozbih Khwashbudhan or Rozbih Budhakhshan; c. 568 CE– c. 652 or 653 CE) was a Persian religious scholar and one of the companions of Muhammad. As a practicing Zoroastrian, he dedicated much of his early life to studying to become a magus, after which he began travelling extensively throughout West Asia to engage in constructive dialogue with non-Zoroastrian groups. His quests eventually led to his conversion to Islam, which occurred after he met and befriended Islamic prophet Muhammad in the city of Medina. He was a prominent non-Arab companion and one of Muhammad's closest friends; Muhammad had once stated to a gathering of his followers that he regarded Salman as a part of his family. Muhammad is reported to have specifically said "Salman is part of my Ahl al-Bayt." In meetings with the other companions, he was often referred to by the kunya Abu ʿAbdullah.

Prior to the Battle of the Trench in 627, Salman suggested to Muhammad and the other early Muslims that a large trench be dug around Yathrib (citing a technique commonly used by the Sasanian army) in order to help defend against the Quraysh, who were marching from Mecca in order to besiege the city. After Muhammad's death in 632, Salman became closely associated with Muhammad's cousin and son-in-law Ali ibn Abi Talib and is claimed to have participated in the Muslim conquest of Persia, aiding the territorial expansion of the Rashidun Caliphate outside of the Arabian Peninsula.

== Early life ==
The date and place of Salman's birth are disputed. Based on available evidence, he was likely born between 568 and 570 AD. Salman was a Persian originally named as either Rozbih Khwashbudhan, or Rozbih Budhakhshan. His birthplace is reported as either Kazerun in Fars province or Isfahan in Isfahan province. In a hadith, Salman also traced his ancestry to Ramhormoz. The first sixteen years of his life were dedicated to studying to become a Zoroastrian magus or priest, after which he became the guardian of a fire temple.

=== Conversion to Christianity from Zoroastrianism ===
Salman's father owned a large farm, Salman at first knew nothing about Christianity, as his father kept him locked up in his house, one day, when attending the farm, as his father was not attending it, Salman passed a Christian church and observed the congregation in prayer. Impressed by their religious practices, he remained at the church until sunset, neglecting his assigned duties on the farm. Upon inquiring about the origins of the faith, he was told that Christianity originated in Syria. Upon returning home, Salman's father upbraided him, demanding to know where he had been, after Salman told him about the church and how he had been so impressed with their faith that he had stayed all night, Salman's father responded: "My son, there is no good in that religion; the religion of your fathers is better than that." Salman responded by saying Christianity was superior to Zoroastrianism, and left. Fearing that his son would apostatise, he placed Salman in fetters and imprisoned him at home. Salman later escaped, though he did not specify how, and joined a caravan heading toward Syria.

=== Conversion to Islam from Christianity ===
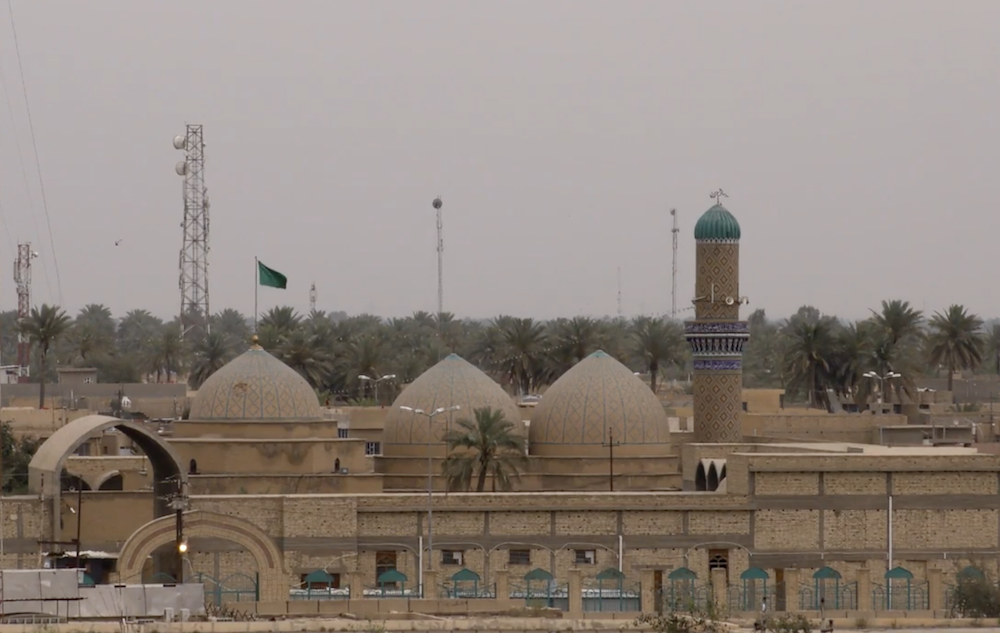
The Tomb of Salman in Salman Pak, or Al-Mada'in, Iraq.

Salman, following the caravan, arrived in Roman Syria, after it turned out his teacher had engaged in fraud, who embezzled alms, he told the Christians who were to bury him about this, and they crucified his body and stoned it. Afterwards, Salman attached himself to the "bishop" of Mosul, who then told him to go to Nasibin, where there was a man who he should follow, Salman then went to Nasibin, and when the man in Nasibin died, he went to Ammuriya, who told him that a new prophet would arise in Arabia. During his stay in Syria, he heard of Muhammad, whose coming had been predicted by Salman's last Christian teacher on his deathbed. Afterwards and during his journey to the Arabian Peninsula, he was betrayed and sold to a Jew in Medina. After meeting Muhammad, he recognized the signs that the monk had described to him. He converted to Islam and secured his freedom with the help of Muhammad. Salman is the first Iranian who converted to Islam. According to sources, Salman converted to Islam before the Battle of Badr, but because he was a slave before the Battle of the Trench, he did not participate in the Battles of Badr and Mount Uhud. Abu Hurairah is said to have referred to Salman as "Abu al-Kitabayn" ("the father of the two books"; that is, the Bible and the Quran), and Ali is said to have referred to him as "Luqman al-Hakim" ("Luqman the wise," a reference to a wise man mentioned in the Quran). Whenever people inquired about his ancestry, Salman is said to have replied: "I am Salman, the son of Islam from the child of Adam."

== Career as a Sahabi ==
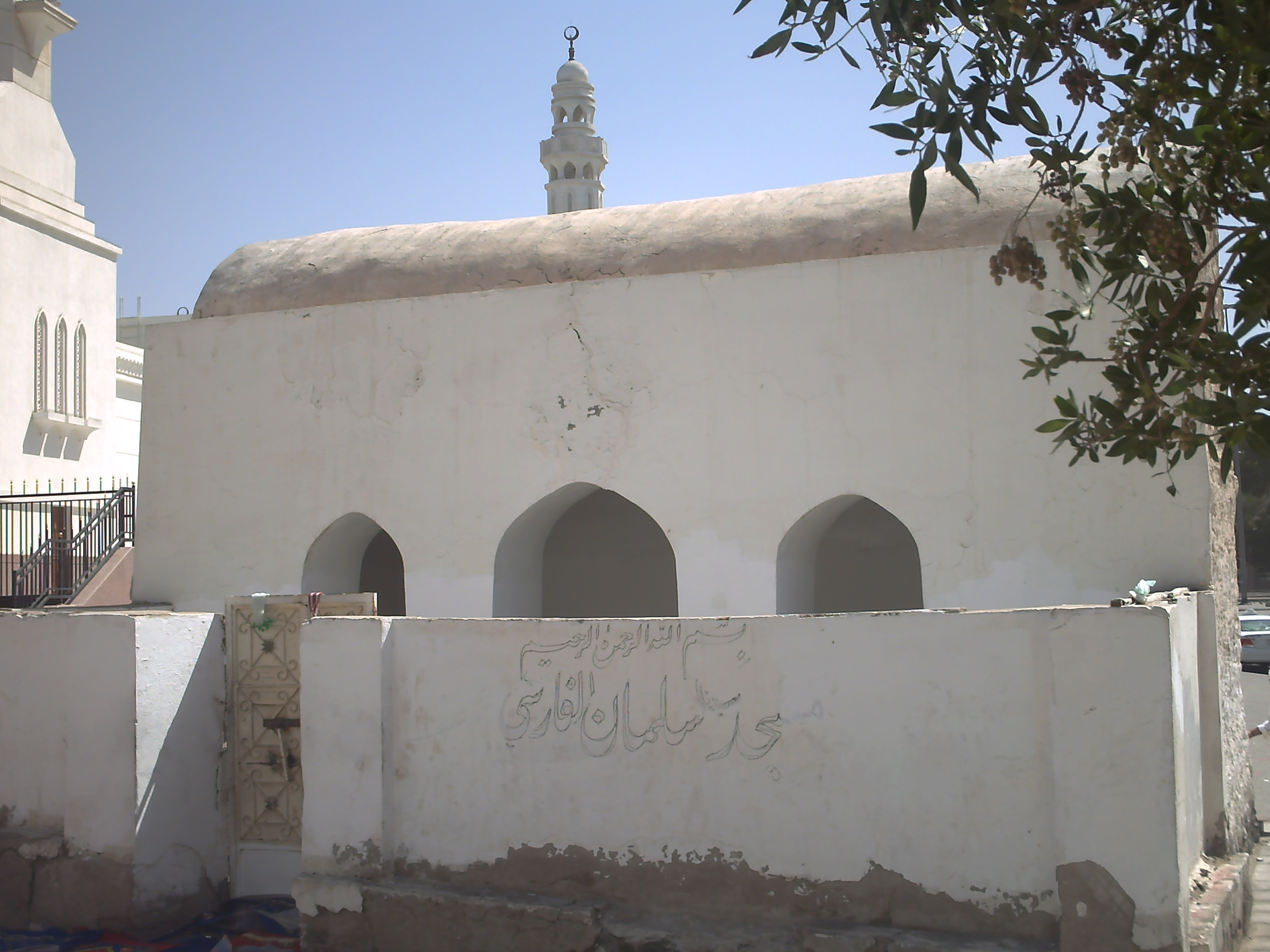
A mosque named after Salman the Persian at the site of the Battle of the Trench in Medina.

Salman came up with the idea of digging a great trench around the Medina, to defend the city against the army of 10,000 Arabian non-Muslims. Muhammad and his companions accepted Salman's plan because it was safer, and there would be a better chance that the non-Muslim army would have a larger number of casualties.

While some sources gather Salman with the Muhajirun, other sources narrate that during the Battle of the Trench, one of Muhajirun stated "Salman is one of us, Muhajirun", but this was challenged by the Muslims of Medina (also known as the Ansar). A lively argument began between the two groups with each of them claiming Salman belonged to their group and not to the other one. Muhammad arrived on the scene and heard the argument. He was amused by the claims but soon put an end to the argument by saying: "Salman is neither Muhajir nor Ansar. He is one of us. He is one of the People of the House."

Salman participated in the conquest of the Sasanian Empire, and became the first governor of the Sasanian capital Ctesiphon, after its fall at the time of the second Rashidun Caliph, Umar ibn Al-Khattab.

=== Notable works ===
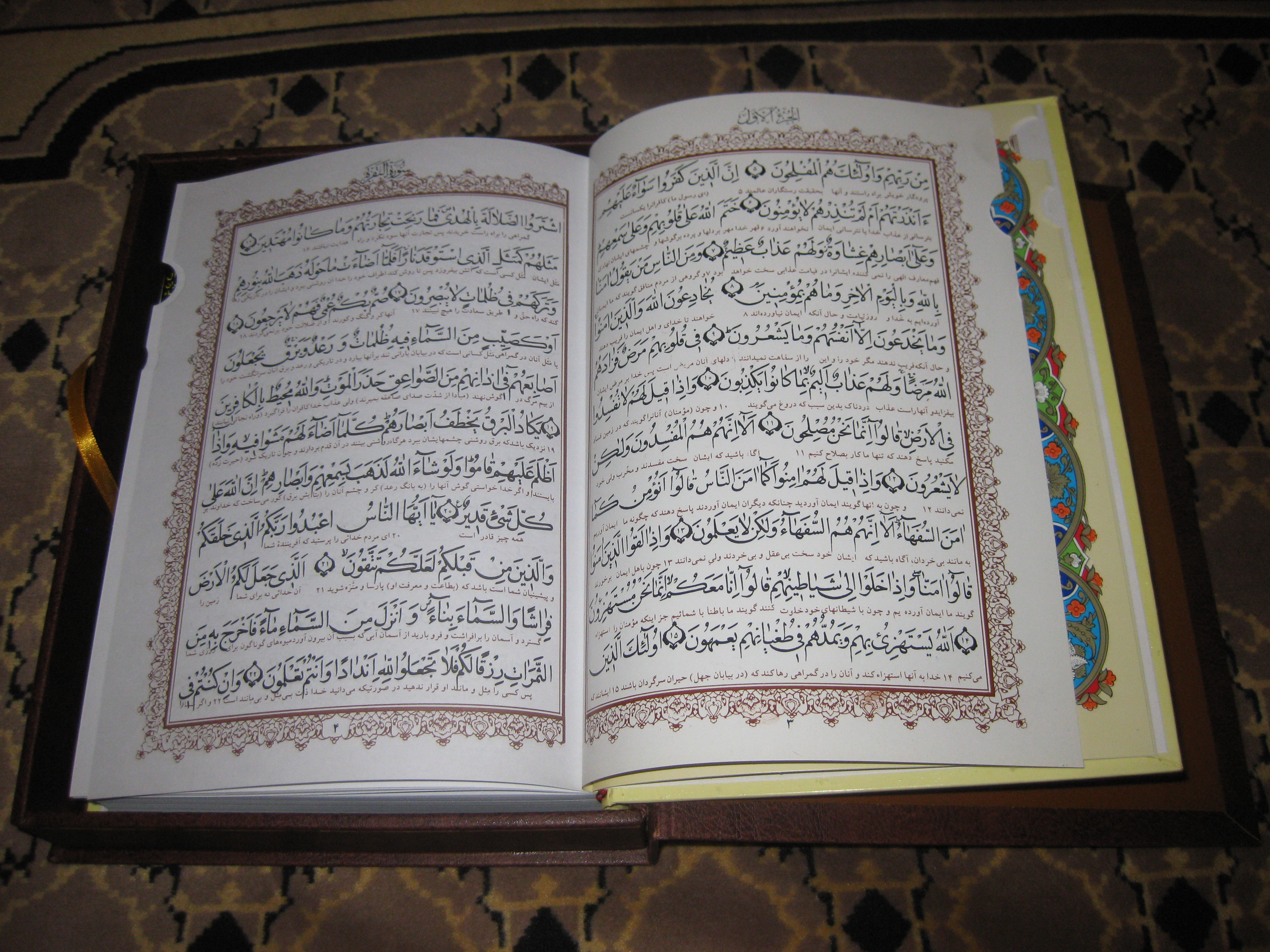
Salman translated the Quran into Persian, thus becoming the first person to interpret and translate the Quran into a non-Arabic language.

==== Translation of the Quran ====
Salman translated the Quran into Persian, thus becoming the first person to interpret and translate the Quran into a foreign language. Salman is said to have written the following poem on his enshrouding cotton:

I am heading toward the Munificent, lacking a sound heart and an appropriate provision,
While taking a provision (with you) is the most dreadful deed, if you are going to the Munificent

Salman used to cut the hair of Muhammad at the time, inspiring plates in Turkish barber shops with the verse:

Every morning our shop opens with the basmala,
Hazrat-i Salman-i Pak is our pir and our master.

==== Manuscripts ====
Salman al-Farsi calligraphy at the Prophet's Mosque in Medina.

Salman is considered one of the pioneers in Shia written works. In addition, written works have also been attributed to him. Including a work called "Khabar Jathliq ar-Rumi". Of course, this work is a text that Salman only narrated and was not the author of. "Khabar Jathliq ar-Rumi" contains the theological questions of the Roman emperor to the Caliph of the Muslims after the death of Muhammad and Ali's answer to those questions. Ibn Babawayh quoted three parts of it and at the end of the second and third quotations he pointed out that the full text of Salman's book is at the end of the book Muhammad had been brought.

== Death ==
One source states that he died in the Hijrah year of 36, or 656. Other sources state that he died in the year 35 AH, or 655. His tomb is located in Salman Al-Farsi Mosque in Al-Mada'in, or according to some others, in Isfahan, Jerusalem or elsewhere.

== Legacy ==
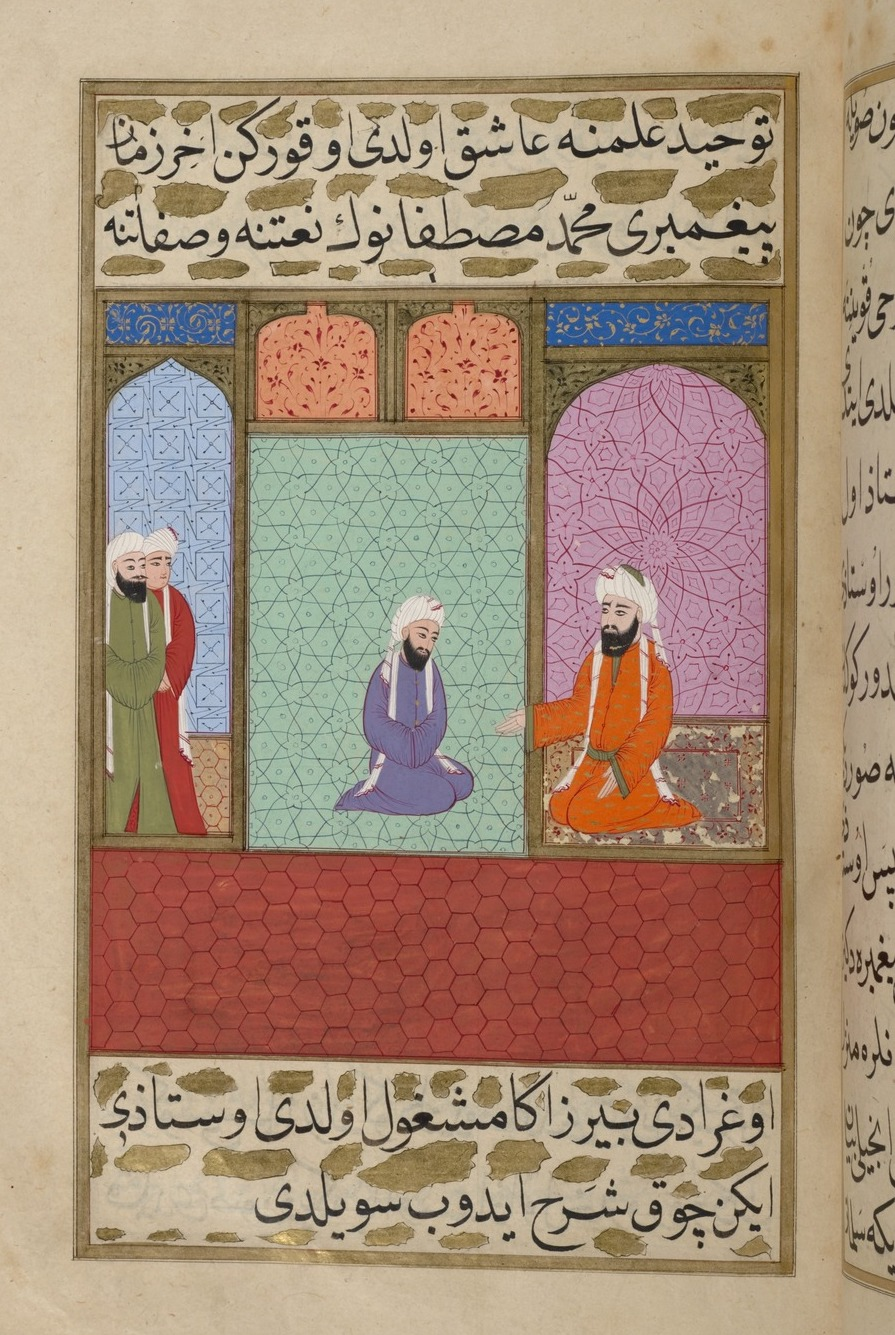
Salman and his religious instructor

=== Shia Islam ===
Shi'ites, Twelvers in particular, hold Salman in high esteem for a hadith attributed to him, in which all twelve Imāms were mentioned to him by name, from Muhammad. Salman, along with Abu Dharr al-Ghifari, Ammar ibn Yasir, and Miqdad ibn Aswad, is considered to be the four loftiest of the Shi'a. Ali Asgher Razwy, a 20th-century Shia Twelver Islamic scholar states:

If anyone wishes to see the real spirit of Islam, he will find it, not in the deeds of the nouveaux riches of Medina, but in the life, character and deeds of such companions of the Apostle of God as Ali ibn Abi Talib, Salman el-Farsi, Abu Dharr el-Ghiffari, Ammar ibn Yasir, Owais Qarni and Bilal. The orientalists will change their assessment of the spirit of Islam if they contemplate it in the austere, pure and sanctified lives of these latter companions.

— Ali Asgher Razwy, A Restatement of the History of Islam and Muslims

==== Alawism ====
For Alawites, Salman is part of a divine trinity alongside Muhammad and Ali, the latter of whom is seen as a manifestation of Allah.

=== Sufism ===
Salman is also well known as a prominent figure in Sufism. Sufi orders such as Qadiri, Bektashi, and Naqshbandi have Salman in their isnad of their brotherhood. In the Uwaysi-Shahmaqsudi order of Kubrawi Sufism and in Naqshbandi Sufism, Salman is the third person in the chain connecting devotees with Muhammad. The members of futuwwa associations also regarded Salman as one of their founders, along with Ali.

=== Druzism ===
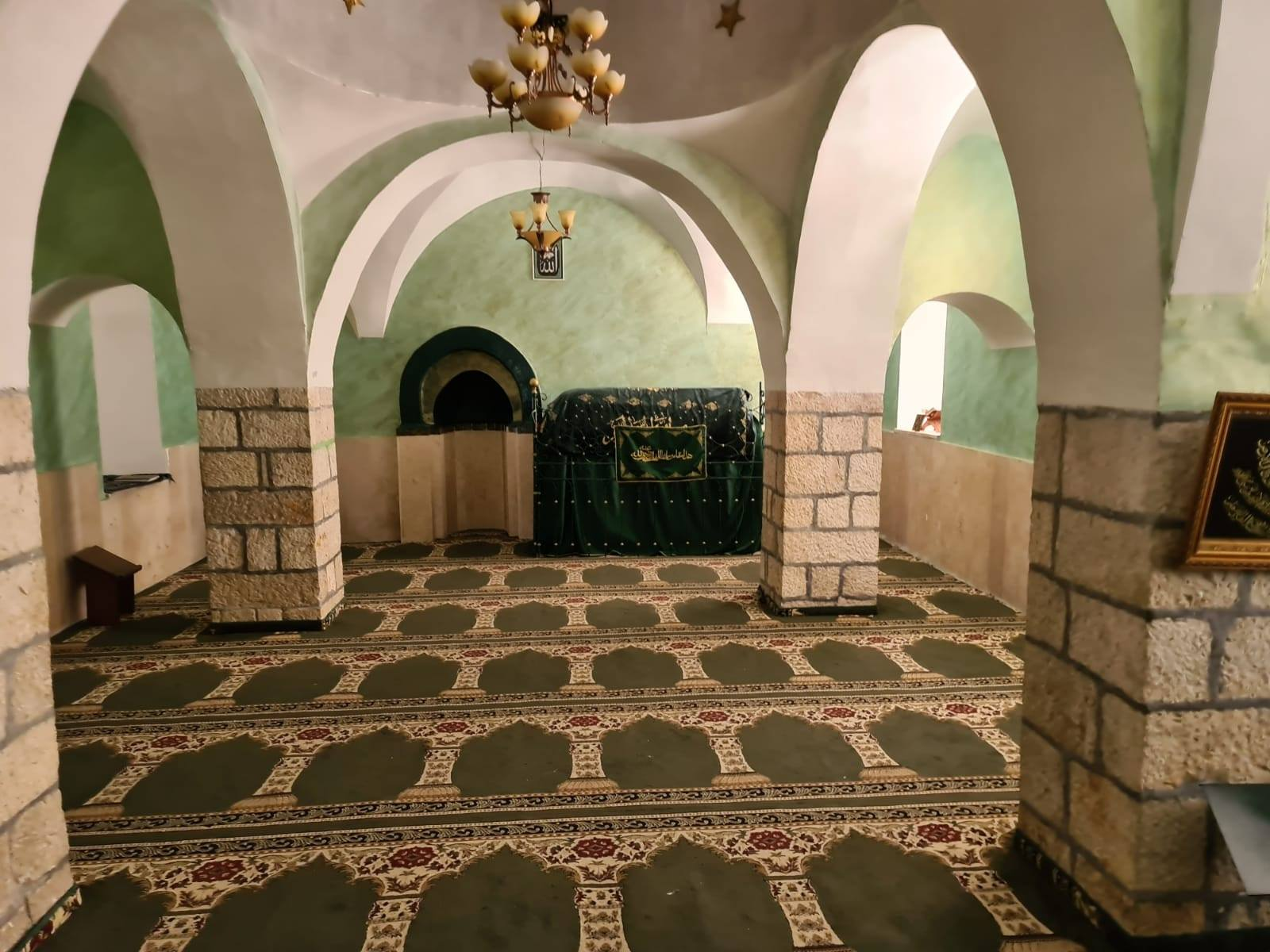
Druze maqam of Salman the Persian, Syria

Druze tradition honors several "mentors" and "prophets", and Salman is honored as a prophet, and as an incarnation of the monotheistic idea.

=== Bahá’í Faith ===
In the Kitáb-i-Íqán, Bahá'u'lláh honours Salman for having been told about the coming of Muhammad:

As to the signs of the invisible heaven, there appeared four men who successively announced unto the people the joyful tidings of the rise of that divine Luminary. Rúz-bih, later named Salmán, was honoured by being in their service. As the end of one of these approached, he would send Rúz-bih unto the other, until the fourth who, feeling his death to be nigh, addressed Rúz-bih saying: 'O Rúz-bih! when thou hast taken up my body and buried it, go to Hijáz for there the Day-star of Muhammad will arise. Happy art thou, for thou, shalt behold His face!'

== See also ==
- List of non-Arab companions of Muhammad
