= Shahid =

Martyr in Islam

Shahid, (Note: Arabic: شهيد, romanized: Šahīd, pronounced [ʃaˈhiːd]; fem. شهيدة Šahīdah [ʃaˈhiːdah]; pl. شهداء Šuhadāʾ [ʃuhaˈdaːʔ]) also pronounced shaheed, is an Islamic term of Arabic-origin meaning "martyr", used by Muslims for mujahideen who die while fighting in the cause of Allah. The word is used frequently in the Quran in the generic sense of "witness" but only once in the sense of "martyr" (i.e. one who dies for his faith); the latter sense acquires wider usage in the hadith. The term is also used in some non-Muslim communities (Arab Christians) who were influenced by Islamic Persianate culture, such as amongst Hindus and Sikhs in India.

The term is commonly used as a posthumous title for those who are considered to have accepted or even consciously sought out their own death in order to bear witness to their beliefs. Like the English-language word martyr, in the 20th century, the word shahid came to have both religious and non-religious connotations, and has often been used to describe those who died for non-religious ideological causes.

== Etymology ==
In Arabic, the word shahid also pronounced shaheed means "witness". The broadening of the term's meaning over time closely parallels that of the Greek word mártys (Greek: μάρτυς, romanized: mắrtŭs, lit. 'witness'; also "martyr" in the New Testament), the origin of the term martyr.

== Scriptures ==
=== Quran ===
A shahid is considered one whose place in Paradise is promised according to these verses in the Quran:

Never think of those martyred in the cause of Allah as dead. In fact, they are alive with their Lord, well provided for—rejoicing in Allah’s bounties and being delighted for those yet to join them. There will be no fear for them, nor will they grieve. They are joyful for receiving Allah’s grace and bounty, and that Allah does not deny the reward of the believers.

— Quran 3:169–170, https://quran.com/ali-imran/169-170

Allah hath purchased of the believers their persons and their goods; for theirs (in return) is the garden (of Paradise): they fight in His cause, and slay and are slain: a promise binding on Him in truth, through the Torah, the Gospel, and the Qur’an: and who is more faithful to his covenant than Allah? then rejoice in the bargain which ye have concluded: that is the achievement supreme.

— Quran 9:111

The Quranic passage that follows is the source of the concept of Muslim martyrs being promised Paradise:

Those who leave their homes in the cause of Allah, and are then slain or die,- On them will Allah bestow verily a goodly Provision: Truly Allah is He Who bestows the best provision. Verily He will admit them to a place with which they shall be well pleased: for Allah is All-Knowing, Most Forbearing.

— Quran 22:58–59

=== Hadiths ===
The importance of faith is highlighted in the following hadith:

It has been narrated on the authority of Anas b. Malik that the Messenger of Allah (may peace be upon him) said: Who seeks martyrdom with sincerity shall get its reward, though he may not achieve it.

— Collected by Muslim ibn al-Hajjaj, "Sahih Muslim"

Narrated Sahl ibn Hunayf: The Messenger of Allah (ﷺ) said, “Whoever asks Allah for martyrdom with the sincere intention of Allah, Allah will grant him the status of a martyr, even if he dies in his bed.”

— Muslim 1909, Tirmidhi 1653, Nasa’i 3162, Abu Dawud 1520, Ibn Majah 2797, Darimi 2407

It is thus not the outcome that determines the placement in Heaven but rather the intention.

Nonetheless, Paradise for a shahid is a popular concept in the Islamic tradition according to Hadith, and the attainment of this title is honorific.

Muhammad is reported to have said these words about martyrdom:

By Him in Whose Hands my life is! I would love to be martyred in Allah's Cause and then get resurrected and then get martyred, and then get resurrected again and then get martyred and then get resurrected again and then get martyred.

— Collected by Muhammad al-Bukhari, Sahih al-Bukhari

The Prophet said, "Nobody who enters Paradise likes to go back to the world even if he got everything on the Earth, except a Mujahid who wishes to return to the world so that he may be martyred ten times because of the dignity he receives (from Allah).

— Collected by Muhammad al-Bukhari, Sahih al-Bukhari

Several hadith also indicate the nature of a shahid's life in Paradise. Shahids attain the highest level of Paradise, the Paradise of al-Firdous.

Haritha was martyred on the day (of the battle) of Badr, and he was a young boy then. His mother came to the Prophet and said, "O Allah's Apostle! You know how dear Haritha is to me. If he is in Paradise, I shall remain patient, and hope for reward from Allah, but if it is not so, then you shall see what I do?" He said, "May Allah be merciful to you! Have you lost your senses? Do you think there is only one Paradise? There are many Paradises and your son is in the (most superior) Paradise of Al-Firdaus.

— Collected by Muhammad al-Bukhari, Sahih al-Bukhari

Furthermore, Samura narrated:

The Prophet said, "Last night two men came to me (in a dream) and made me ascend a tree and then admitted me into a better and superior house, better of which I have never seen. One of them said, 'this house is the house of martyrs.'

— Collected by Muhammad al-Bukhari, Sahih al-Bukhari

There are at least five different kinds of martyrs according to hadith.

Allah's Apostle said, "Five are regarded as martyrs: They are those who die because of plague, abdominal disease, drowning or a falling building etc., and the martyrs in Allah's cause.

— Collected by Muhammad al-Bukhari, Sahih al-Bukhari

One who dies protecting his property is also considered a martyr according to Hadith:

I heard the Prophet saying, "Whoever is killed while protecting his property then he is a martyr.

— Collected by Muhammad al-Bukhari, Sahih al-Bukhari

While the Qur'an does not indicate much about martyrs' death and funeral, the hadith provides some information on this topic. For example, martyrs are to be buried two in one grave in their blood, without being washed or having a funeral prayer held for them. The following Hadith highlight this:

The Prophet collected every two martyrs of Uhud in one piece of cloth, then he would ask, "Which of them had (known) more of the Quran?" When one of them was pointed out for him, he would put that one first in the grave and say, "I will be a witness on these on the Day of Resurrection." He ordered them to be buried with their blood on their bodies and they were neither washed nor was a funeral prayer offered for them.

— Collected by Muhammad al-Bukhari, Sahih al-Bukhari

==== The least painful death ====
Imran ibn Yazid (RA) ... Abu Hurairah (RA) reported that the Messenger of Allah (ﷺ) said, "A martyr will not feel the pain of being killed more than the pain of being bitten by an ant or pinched by a pin."

— Ibn Majah 2802. Tahqiq: Hasan.

==== Not accepting the exibitionist martyrdom ====
Yahya ibn Habib al-Harithi (may Allah be pleased with him) ..... Narrated Sulayman ibn Yasar (may Allah be pleased with him). He said, Once when the people were leaving Abu Hurairah (may Allah be pleased with him), Natil (may Allah be pleased with him) from Syria said, O Sheikh! Tell us a hadith that you heard from the Messenger of Allah (peace and blessings of Allah be upon him). He said, Yes! (I will listen). I heard the Messenger of Allah (peace and blessings of Allah be upon him) say, The first person to be judged on the Day of Resurrection will be a martyr. He will be brought and Allah will tell him about his blessings and he will recognize them all (and will confess them as usual). Then Allah the Almighty will say, What did you do in return for this? He will say, I fought in Your way until I was martyred. Then Allah will say, "You have lied. Rather, you fought so that people would say of you, 'You are a warrior.'" It has been said, and then the command will be given. According to that, he will be dragged on his back and thrown into Hell.

— Muslim 1905

==== A person who is more honored than a martyr ====
"Around the Throne are pulpits of light, on which will be seated a group of people, whose clothes are light and whose faces are light, but they are neither prophets nor martyrs, and the prophets and martyrs will envy them." The companions said: O Messenger of Allah! Describe for us their description." He said: They are those who love one another for the sake of Allah, who befriend one another for the sake of Allah, and who are friends with one another for the sake of Allah. Interviewer./"Among the servants of Allah are some who are neither prophets nor martyrs; but on the Day of Resurrection, the prophets and martyrs will envy them (i.e., will be happy to see their high status) in the court of Allah.

The Companions asked: O Messenger of Allah! Tell us who they are?

The Messenger of Allah (peace and blessings of Allah be upon him) said: They are those who love each other for the sake of Allah, sit together for the sake of Allah, and meet each other for the sake of Allah. On the Day of Resurrection, their seats will be of light, their clothes will be of light, and their faces will be of light. When people are afraid, they will not be afraid, and when people are worried, they will not be worried."

— Musnad Ahmad: Hadith number 22080 (narrated by Mu'adh ibn Jabal). Sunan Abu Dawud: Hadith number 3527 (narrated by Umar ibn al-Khattab). Sahih Ibn Hibban: Hadith number 573. Silsilat al-Sahihah 2510 Mustadrak al-Hakim: Hadith number 7314."Nasa'i, as-Sunan al-Kubra and the hadith is sahih.

==== The promised Shahids ====
The Sahabas specifically mentioned as Shahid in Hadith are (shia dispute some are considered shahid with them marked as *):

1. Umar ibn al-Khattab*
2. Uthman ibn Affan*
3. Ali ibn Abi Talib
4. Hamza ibn Abdul Muttalib
5. Ja'far ibn Abi Talib
6. Husayn ibn Ali
7. Hasan ibn Ali
8. Talha ibn Ubayd Allah*
9. Zubayr ibn al-Awam*
10. Sumayyah bint Khayyat
11. Yasir ibn Amir
12. Ammar ibn Yasir
13. Sa'd ibn Mu'adh
14. Mus'ab ibn Umayr
15. Haritha ibn Suraqah

== Sikhism ==
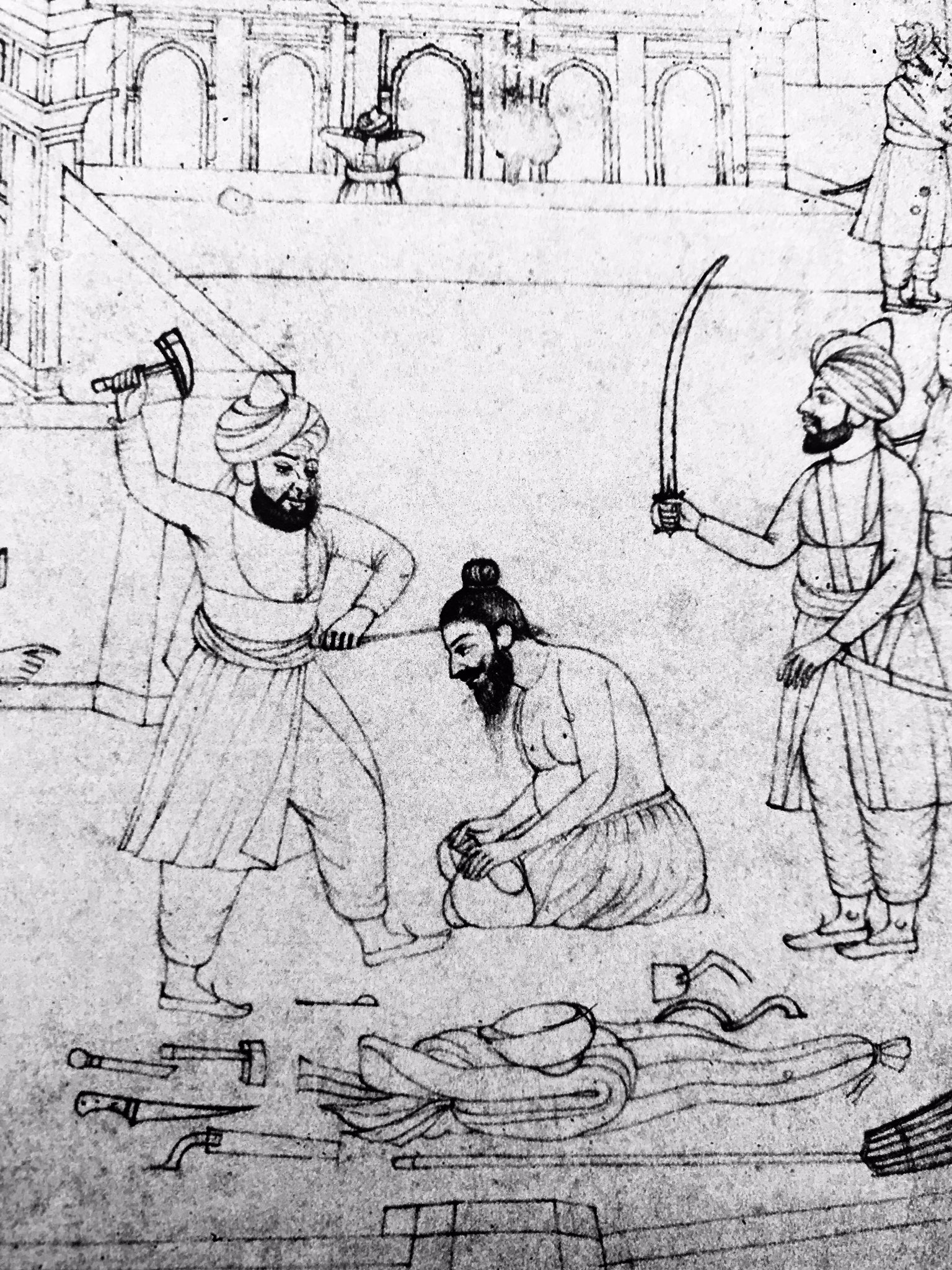
Detail of Taru Singh being scalped alive from a 19th century Sikh drawing depicting his martyrdom

The word shahid (Punjabi: ਸ਼ਹੀਦ, romanized: śahīd) is also found in Sikhism, a religion founded by Guru Nanak in the northwest part of the Indian subcontinent (now Pakistan and northern India). It means a martyr.

The term was borrowed from the Islamic culture in Punjab when Sikhism was founded, and before the start of the British Raj it referred to the Sikh people who met death at the hands of oppressors. Another related term is shahid-ganj, which means a "place of martyrdom".

The most discussed shahid in Sikhism have been two of their Gurus, namely Guru Arjan and Guru Tegh Bahadur for defying Islamic rulers and refusing to convert to Islam. Guru Arjan was arrested under the orders of the Mughal Emperor Jahangir and asked to convert to Islam. He refused, was tortured and executed in 1606 CE. Historical records and the Sikh tradition are unclear whether Guru Arjan was executed by drowning or died during torture. His martyrdom, that is becoming a shahid, is considered a watershed event in the history of Sikhism.

Guru Tegh Bahadur's martyrdom resulted from his refusal to convert and his resistance to the forced conversions of Hindus in Kashmir (Kashmiri Pandits) to Islam because he believed in freedom of conscience and human rights. He was publicly beheaded in 1675 on the orders of Mughal emperor Aurangzeb in Delhi. Gurudwara Sis Ganj Sahib in Delhi marks the shahid-ganj, or place of execution of the Guru.

The Sikh have other major pilgrimage sites, such as the shahid-ganj in Sirhind, where two sons of Guru Gobind Singh were bricked alive by the Mughal Army in retaliation of their father's resistance. In Sri Muktsar Sahib, near a lake is a shahid-ganj dedicated to forty men who died defending Guru Gobind Singh.

== Modern usage ==
In the eighteenth century, several wars of independence took place in the colonial territories of the Muslim world, and many of the soldiers who died in these conflicts were buried as shuhadāʾ (martyrs).

A Muslim who is killed defending his or her property is considered a martyr.

=== In Bosnia and Herzegovina ===
Bosnians who died during the Bosnian War and the Bosnian genocide are considered martyrs by many due to them being killed for being Muslim.

=== In China ===
The Muslim General Ma Fuxiang stated on how Chinese Muslims were willing to die to accomplish tasks assigned to them. Imams sponsored by the Kuomintang called for Muslims to go on Jihad to become martyrs in battle, where Muslims believe they will go automatically to heaven. Becoming a shaheed in the Jihad for the country was encouraged by the Kuomintang, which was called "glorious death for the state" and a hadith promoting nationalism was spread. A song written by Xue Wenbo at the Muslim Chengda school, which was controlled by the Kuomintang, called for martyrdom in battle for China against Japan. The Muslim General Bai Chongxi himself was a member of a Dare to Die corps in the Xinhai revolution.

Some Uyghur activists have referred to victims of the Persecution of Uyghurs in China that died, martyrs.

=== In Palestine ===
In modern political usage, various Palestinian groups consider all Palestinians killed in the Israeli–Palestinian conflict to be martyrs for the cause, whether they were civilians or fighters. Groups such as Hamas and the Palestinian Islamic Jihad consider martyrdom as the highest form of sacrifice for the Palestinian cause. This ethos is widespread in educational materials, visual media, community events and ceremonies.

== Women ==
A woman is considered "shahida" (شَهِيدَة Shahidah) if she dies during the fulfillment of a religious commandment. A woman can also be considered a martyr if she dies during childbirth. There are examples of women fighting in war such as Nusaybah bint Ka'ab. The first martyr (male or female) in Islam was Sumayyah bint Khayyat, who was executed for her conversion to Islam. She died after Abu Jahl, an anti-Muslim leader of the Quraysh, stabbed her in the abdomen. Though her name is not common in the modern Muslim dialogue, ancient Islamic literature makes note of the events at the end of her life.

== Other religions ==
Over a period of time, the word shahid began to be used by non-Muslims such as Arab Christians to denote their own martyrs. So the word is still used by Christians in Arab-speaking countries, including the names of churches. Examples are the Forty Martyrs Cathedral (Arabic: كنيسة الأربعين شهيد) in Aleppo and the Saint George the Martyr Cathedral (Arabic: كنيسة القدّيس الشهيد مار جرجس) in Damascus, both in Syria.

In the Indian subcontinent, Hindus adopted the word shahid (as well as balidānī बलिदानी "sacrificer, one willing to sacrifice oneself") as a synonym to the Sanskrit word hutātmā (हुतात्मा in Devanagari, ହୁତାତ୍ମା in Odia and হুতাত্মা in Bengali; हुत, ହୁତ and হুত huta = sacrificing, आत्मा, ଆତ୍ମା and আত্মা ātmā = soul; thus hutātmā = sacrificing soul, martyr), to denote Hindu martyrs.

== Conditions for accepting Shahadat ==
Those who fight and die in the way of Allah with the pure intention of upholding the word of Tawheed are the true martyrs, and the condition for accepting Shahadat (martyrdom) to Allah is that one does not fight for the sake of showing off, to be called brave, or to make people listen.

== The forgiveness of sins of a martyr ==
According to Islam, all sins of a martyr are forgiven, except for debts.

== Conditions for being called a Shahid ==
In Islam, if someone other than those mentioned as Shahid in the Quran and Hadith fulfills the conditions for being a Shahid, then according to the prohibition of Umar as narrated in Sahih Muslim, he cannot be called a martyr directly, Because this means that he is certain to be in Paradise after death, which is impossible to know without Allah's knowledge, many scholars including Assim al-Hakeem advise that it is better to say "We hope and pray that Allah will accept him as a martyr" rather than saying "Shahid".

== Prayer for shahadah (martyrdom) ==
Yahya ibn Bukair (may Allah be pleased with him) narrated that ‘Umar (may Allah be pleased with him) used to supplicate: اللَّهُمَّ ارْزُقْنِي شَهَادَةً فِي سَبِيلِكَ، وَاجْعَلْ مَوْتِي فِي بَلَدِ رَسُولِكَ صلى الله عليه وسلم (O Allah! Grant me martyrdom in Your path and cause me to die in the city of Your Messenger). Ibn Zuray'i (may Allah be pleased with him) ... Narrated Hafsa bint Umar (may Allah be pleased with him), who said: I heard Umar (may Allah be pleased with him) narrate the same. Hisham (may Allah be pleased with him) said: Zaid (may Allah be pleased with him) narrated from Hafsa (may Allah be pleased with him) from his father, who said: I heard Umar (may Allah be pleased with him) say. Abu 'Abdullah (may Allah be pleased with him) said: "Rawah (may Allah be pleased with him) narrated from his mother."

— Bukhari, 1769

== Anonymous Shahadat ==
Anonymous martyrs (Persian: شهید گمنام) is a term commonly used to refer to the remains of those Iranians who were killed in the Iran–Iraq War but could not be identified, due to limited technology and poor organization. To this day, these Iranian casualties are still unknown. However, the commander of the Iranian Revolutionary Guard, General Rahim Safavi, estimated that there were around 213,000 such martyrs. More traditionally the authorities relied on the uniforms and the kind of gear used by the soldier to determine whether he is Iranian or not, but during the recent years there has been an increased use of DNA testings to make that determination. Usually, a mausoleum is built over the tomb of the people to allow for visits.

The government has created sites at universities around the country and buried the remains of newly found anonymous martyrs. For example, in 2011, 19 people's remains were honored in 13 locations in the provinces of Tehran, Semnan, Chahar Mahal and Bakhtiyari, Kerman, Fars, Ilam, Markazi, and Lorestan. Some of the martyrs were returned to their places of birth or the places of their martyrdom.

There are also those that were enshrined in monuments, which are often hosted by universities. Notable examples include the Graves and the Monument of Unknown Martyrs at the University of Tehran. This is a simple memorial located at the entrance of the mosque of the university which commemorates the martyrdom of Iranian students in the Iran-Iraq war. There are also the Graves of Unknown Martyrs at Imam Hussain Square, one of Tehran's main public spaces. The city government held a competition for its design, which was won by a concrete five-sided building concept, representing five anonymous martyrs.

Shahid Gomnam Expressway in Tehran is named for the anonymous martyr.

== See also ==
- Istishhad
- Jihad
- Martyr
- Martyr (China)
- Martyrdom in Christianity
- Martyrdom in Judaism
- Martyrdom in Sikhism
- Martyrdom video
- Persecution of Muslims
- Shahada
- Shahed drones
- Shaheed belt
- Shahid (name)
- Shahidka
