= 13 December 2013 Iraq attacks =

Terrorist incident in Iraq

- Part of Iraqi insurgency (post-U.S. withdrawal)
- Location of Diyala Governorate in Iraq
- Location: Iraq; Diyala Governorate; Ramadi
- Date: 13 December 2013
- Attack type: Shooting, car bomb
- Weapons: Bomb, Guns
- Deaths: 36
- Injuries: 46

On Friday 13 December 2013, multiple attacks killed at least 36 people and wounded 46 in Iraq.

A gunman killed at least 18 people, including 15 Iranians and another 7 were wounded, including 5 Iranians in Diyala Governorate, Iraq.

In Ramadi, a car bomb killed at least 6 people and another 10 were wounded.

At least 5 people die and another 14 were injured after a car exploded in Nahrawan.

A car bomb killed at least 5 people and 13 others were wounded in Madain.

Insurgents shoot dead at least 2 people in Ghazaliyah, Baghdad Governorate.
