= Madain =

Madain (Arabic for "cities") may refer to:

- Madain Saleh, an ancient Arabian city
- Al-Mada'in, the ancient capital of the Parthian Empire
- Al-Mada'in District, in Baghdad Governorate, Iraq
- Madain Sari, a fictional ancient city of summoners in the Final Fantasy IX universe.
