= Mosque of Salman al-Farsi =

Mosque in Salman Pak, Iraq

- مسجد سلمان الفارسي
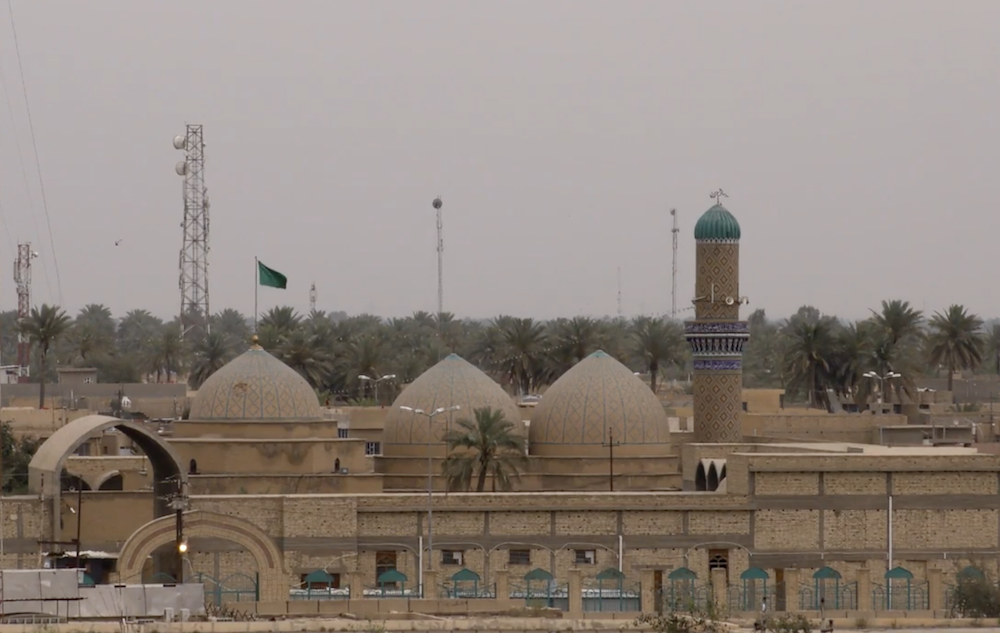
- The mosque in 2017

- Location in Iraq

Religion
- Affiliation: Shia Islam
- Ecclesiastical or organisational status: Mosque and mausoleum
- Status: Active

Location
- Location: Salman Pak, Al-Mada'in, Diyala Province, Baghdad Governorate
- Country: Iraq
- Interactive map of Mosque of Salman al-Farsi
- Coordinates: 33°05′54″N 44°34′52″E

Architecture
- Type: Mosque architecture
- Style: Modern Iraqi; elements of: Ottoman; Abbasid
- Established: c. 1910s (mausoleum); 1950 (mosque)

Specifications
- Capacity: c. 800 worshippers
- Interior area: 500 m^{2} (5,400 sq ft)
- Dome: 4
- Dome height (outer): 17 m (56 ft) (main)
- Minaret: Two
- Minaret height: 23 m (75 ft)
- Shrines: Two: Salman al-Farsi; his companions

The Mosque of Salman al-Farsi (Arabic: مسجد سلمان الفارسي) is a mosque located in the city of Salman Pak, Al-Mada'in district, in the province of Diyala, in the Baghdad Governorate of Iraq. It contains the tomb of Salman the Persian, a Persian companion of the Islamic prophet Muhammad and one of the most prominent non-Arab members of the early Muslim community. After the establishment of Iraq's separate Sunni and Shia endowment offices, the mosque was removed from the Sunni endowment and placed under Shia management.

== History ==
The mosque was established in 1950 over a pre-existing mausoleum dedicated to Salman al-Farsi which was already in existence before the 1920s. In 1931, the bodies of Jabir ibn Abdullah, Hudhayfah ibn al-Yaman, and Ali al-Tahir ibn Muhammad al-Baqir were exhumed due to their graves being water-logged, and the bodies were transferred to new tombs next to the old mausoleum. The report of the bodies being transferred is sometimes contested, however, as Jabir ibn Abdullah is reported to have died in Medina. Later in 1950, the mosque was established over the mausoleum and new tombs, with funding from the Iraqi government.

== Architecture ==
In 2017, a new zarih was placed around the grave of Salman al-Farsi. The ceremony of the placement of the zarih was attended by Iraj Masjedi, the Iranian ambassador to Iraq, as well as several other Shi'ite clerics.

== Usage ==
The mosque is visited because of the sacred tomb within it. However, the mosque also holds Qur'anic memorization courses as well as classes to study the Shari'ah law. Religious festivals are held in the mosque as well.

== Gallery ==
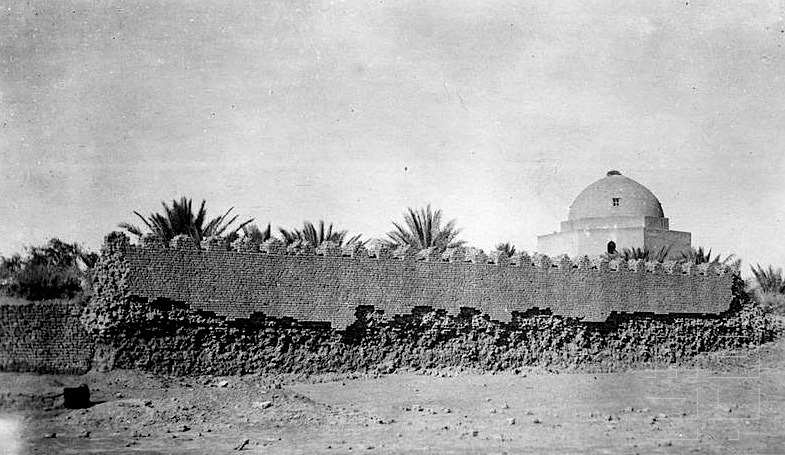
The original mausoleum in 1917, before the mosque was constructed

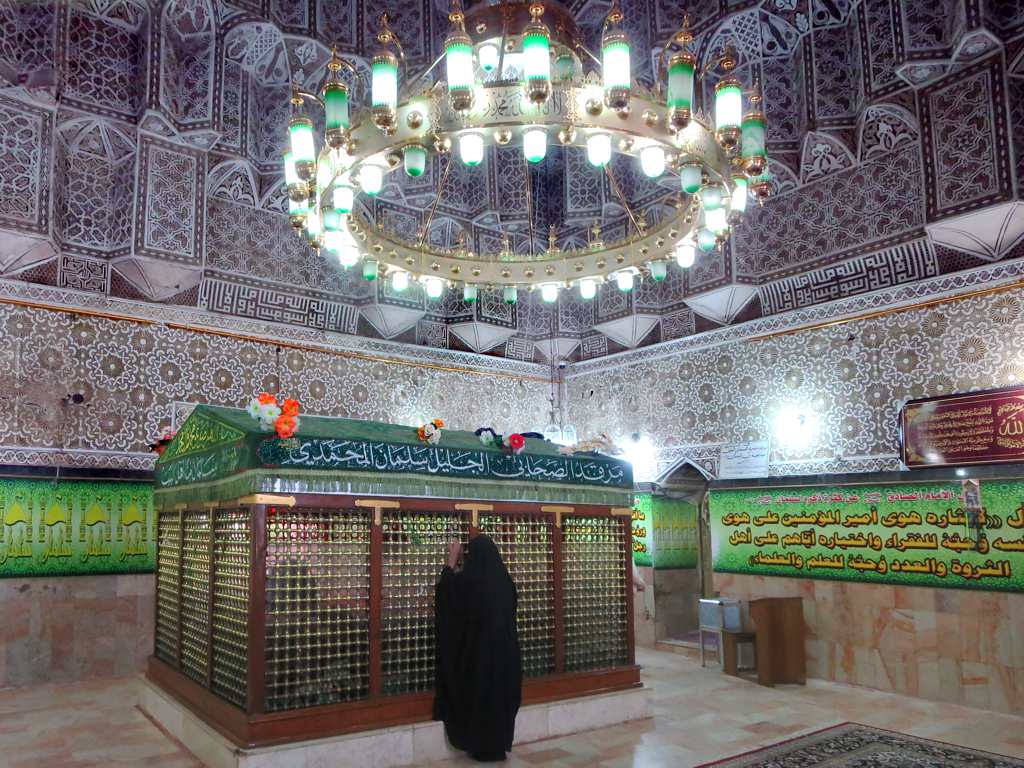
The zarih enclosing the grave of Salman al-Farsi

== See also ==
- Islam in Iraq
- List of mosques in Iraq
