= Yasir ibn Amir =

Companion (Sahabi) of Muhammad

Yasir ibn Amir يَاسِر ٱبْن عَامِر
- Born: Yemen
- Died: 7th century Mecca, Hejaz
- Cause of death: Martyred in torture by Abu Jahl
- Known for: Companion of Muhammad
- Spouse: Sumayyah bint Khayyat
- Children: Ammar, Hurayth, Abd Allah
- Father: Amir ibn Malik

Yasir ibn Amir ibn Malik al-Ansi (Arabic: يَاسِر ٱبْن عَامِر ٱبْن مَالِك ٱلْعَنْسِيّ, romanized: Yāsir ibn ʿĀmir ibn Mālik al-ʿAnsī; sixth/seventh century C.E.) was an early companion of the Islamic prophet Muhammad. He is the second martyr in Islam, with the first being his wife, Sumayya.

== Early life ==
Yasir was originally from the Malik clan of the Madhhij tribe in Yemen. He and his two brothers, Al-Harith and Malik, travelled northwards to Mecca to search for a fourth brother who was lost. Al-Harith and Malik returned to Yemen, but Yasir decided to settle in Mecca. He entered the protection of Abu Hudhayfa ibn al-Mughira, a member of the Makhzum clan of the Quraysh tribe.

Abu Hudhayfa gave Yasir his slave Sumayyah as a wife; they had a son, Ammar, in c.566. Yasir also had two other sons, Hurayth and Abdullah, but there is no indication that Sumayyah was their mother. Hurayth, who was the eldest of the three, was killed by the Dil clan before 610.

== Conversion to Islam ==
Yasir, Sumayyah, Abdullah and Ammar all became Muslims at an early date "on the rise of Islam". From c.614 the Quraysh persecuted Muslims of low social rank. After the death of Abu Hudhayfa left Yasir and his family without a protector in Mecca, the Makhzum clan tortured them to pressure them to abandon their faith.

Yasir, Sumayyah and Ammar were forced to stand in the sun in the heat of the day dressed in mail-coats. Muhammad passed while they were standing like that and urged them, "Patience, O family of Yasir! Your meeting-place will be Paradise."

Abu Jahl, a member of the Makhzum clan, killed Sumayyah by stabbing and impaling her with his spear.

== Death and legacy ==
It is generally assumed that Yasir was also killed in the persecution.

The first victims of pagan attrition and aggression were those Muslims who had no tribal affiliation in Makkah. Yasir and his wife, Sumayya, and their son, Ammar, had no tribal affiliation. In Makkah they were "foreigners" and there was no one to protect them. All three were savagely tortured by Abu Jahl and the other infidels. Sumayya, Yasir's wife, died while she was being tortured. She thus became the First Martyr in Islam. A little later, her husband, Yasir, was also tortured to death, and he became the 'Second Martyr in Islam'.

Quraysh had stained their hands with muslim blood. In the roster of martyrs, Sumayya and her husband, Yasir, rank among the highest. They were killed for no reason other than their devotion to Allah and their love for Islam and Muhammad Mustafa.

Those Muslims who were killed in the battles of Badr and Uhud, had an army to defend and to support them. But Yasir and his wife had no one to defend them; they bore no arms, and they were the most defenseless of all the martyrs of Islam. By sacrificing their lives, they highlighted the truth of Islam, and they built strength into its structure. They made the tradition of sacrifice and martyrdom an integral part of the ethos of Islam.

— Razwy (2001).

However, there is no mention of Yasir's death in any of the early sources such as Ibn Ishaq, Ibn Sa'd, Bukhari, Muslim or Tabari.

== See also ==
- Al-Ansi
- Sahaba
