= Salman Pak =

Salman Pak Arabic: سَلْمَان بَاك Persian: سلمان پاک
- city
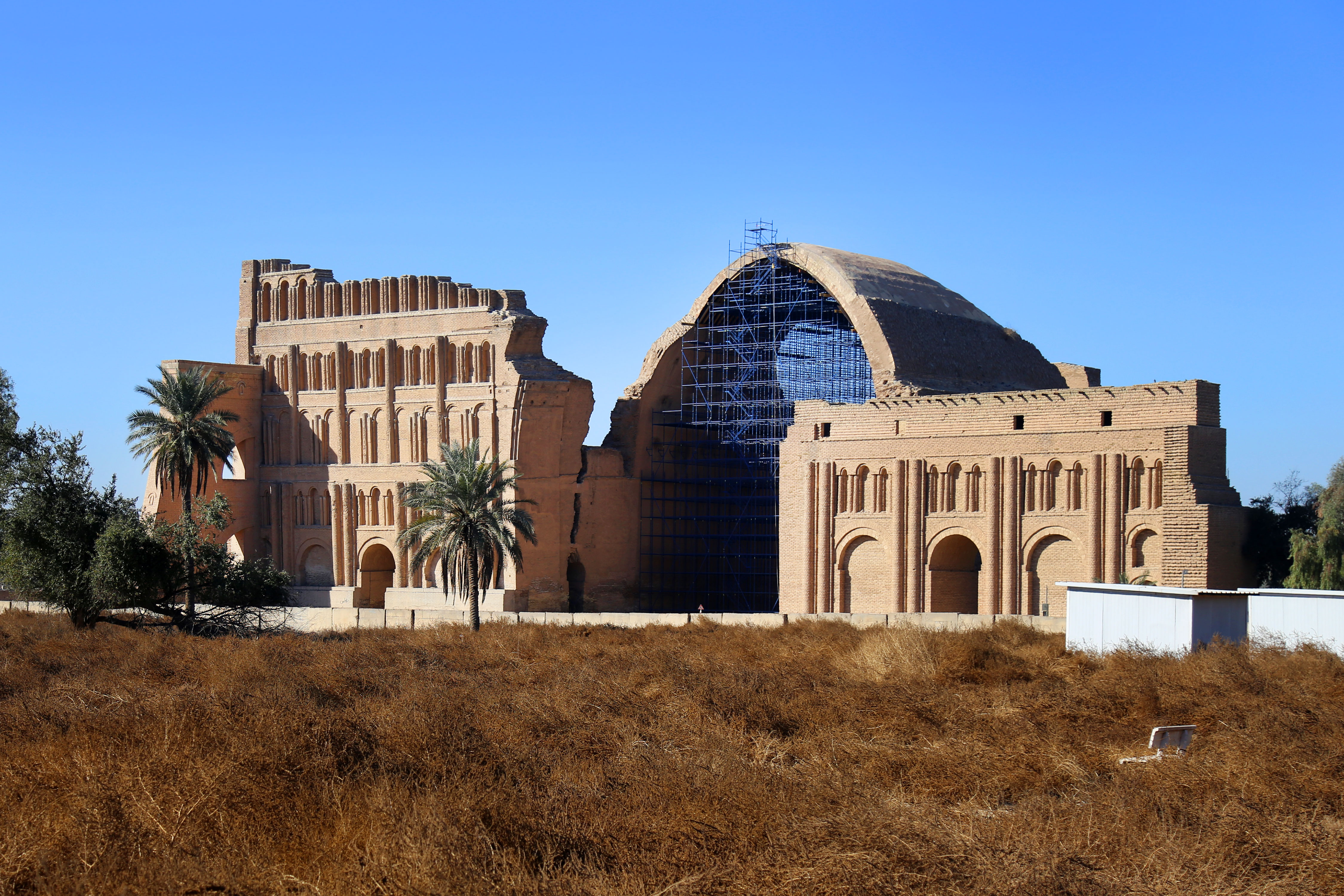
- Salman Pak's famous Taq Kasra, the largest single-span vault of unreinforced brickwork in the world and the only visible remaining structure of the ancient city of Ctesiphon

- Location in Iraq Salman Pak (Middle East) Salman Pak (Asia)
- Coordinates: 33°06′N 44°35′E
- Country: Iraq
- Governorate: Baghdad
- District: Al-Mada'in
- Elevation: 6 m (20 ft)

Population
  - Total: 117,500

Salman Pak (Arabic: سَلْمَان بَاك, Persian: سلمان پاک, romanized: Salman the Pure) is a city located approximately 15 miles (24 km) south of Baghdad near a peninsula formed by a broad eastward bend of the Tigris. It is named after Salman the Persian, a companion of the Islamic prophet Muhammad who is believed to be buried in Salman Al-Farsi Mosque in the city.

The city overlaps with the ancient metropolis of al-Mada'in, which includes the ruins of ancient Ctesiphon and ancient Seleucia. It is also quite close to the Salman Pak facility, an Iraqi military installation which was a key center of Saddam Hussein's biological and chemical weapons programs, though none of these were found. The site included training grounds used by Iraqi intelligence to direct Special Operations Forces.

== See also ==
- Middle East
  - Mesopotamia
