= Uwais al-Qarni Mosque =

Islamic Shrine in Raqqa, Syria

Uwais al-Qarani Mosque
- مَسْجِد أُوَيْس ٱلْقَرَنِيّ
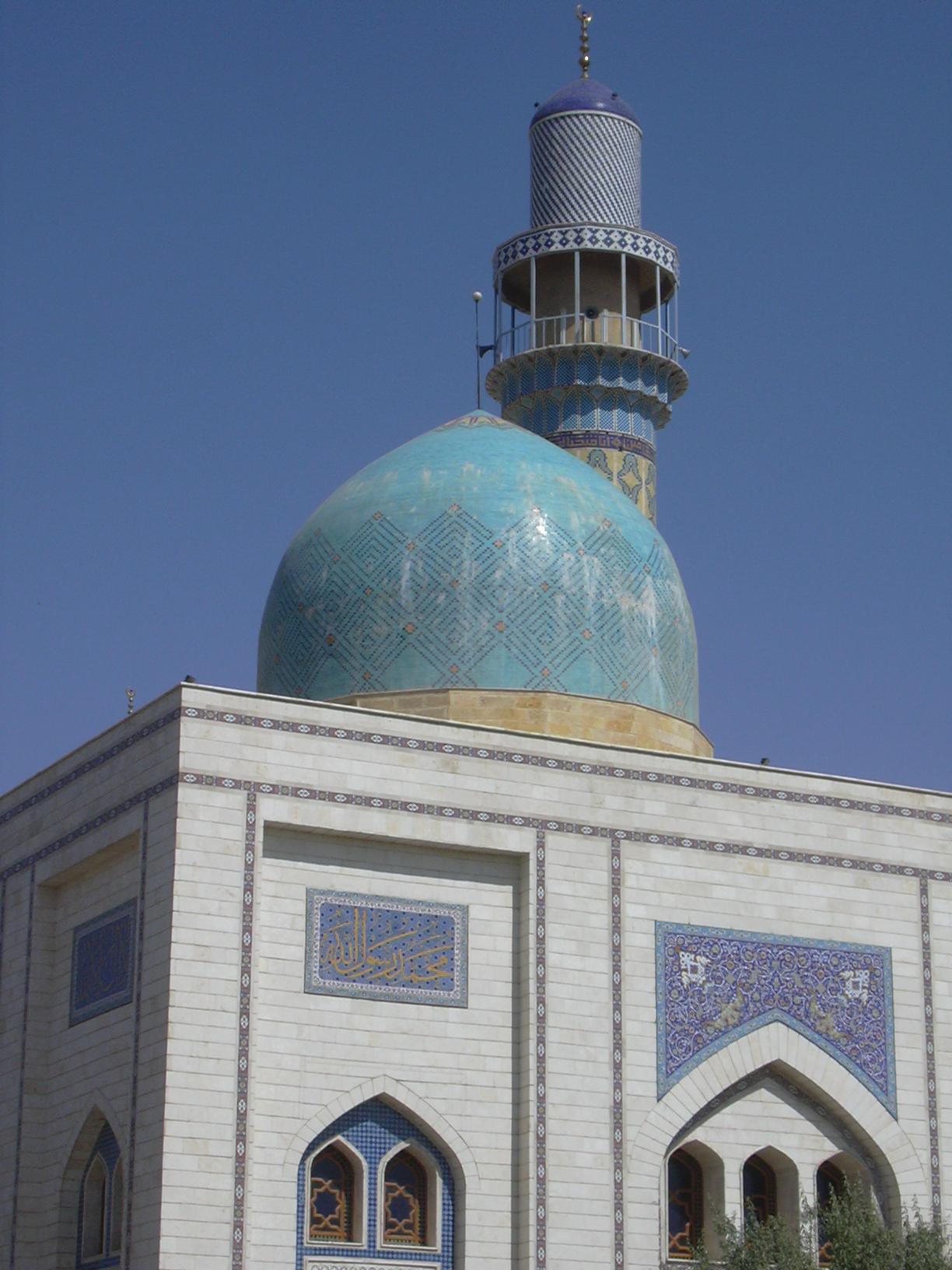
- The mosque in 2006, prior to its 2014 destruction

- Location within Syria

Religion
- Affiliation: Shia (Twelver) (former)
- Ecclesiastical or organisational status: Mosque (former)
- Status: Destroyed (by Islamic State)

Location
- Location: Raqqa
- Country: Syria
- Interactive map of Uwais al-Qarani Mosque
- Coordinates: 35°56′31.82″N 39°01′47.49″E

Architecture
- Type: Mosque architecture
- Completed: 2003
- Destroyed: 2014

Specifications
- Dome: One
- Minaret: One

The Uwais al-Qarani Mosque (Arabic: مَسْجِد أُوَيْس ٱلْقَرَنِيّ, romanized: Masjid ʾUways al-Qaranīy) was a Twelver Shi'a mosque in Raqqa, Syria, until it was demolished by the Islamic State on May 31, 2014. As of 2026, it is currently awaiting reconstruction.

== History ==
The former mosque contained the shrines of Ammar ibn Yasir and Owais al-Qarani, who died in the Battle of Siffin in 657 CE, which took place around 40 kilometres (25 miles) west of Raqqa. It was adjacent to the Bab al-Baghdad, another major landmark in the city.

=== Construction ===
The original tombs were located in the old cemetery at the edge of the city. In 1988, Syrian president Hafez al-Assad and the Supreme Leader of Iran, Ruhollah Khomeini, initiated a project to develop a new mosque around the tombs. The work was completed in 2003 and a commemorative plaque credited President Bashar al-Assad and Iranian President Mohammad Khatami with completing the project.

=== Destruction ===
In June 2013, rebel fighters from al-Muntasereen Billah militia were living in the mosque complex. On 26 March 2014, the mosque was blown up by two powerful explosions and completely destroyed by the Islamic State because it was a Shi'a structure. More specifically, it was also built over graves and thus served as a shrine.

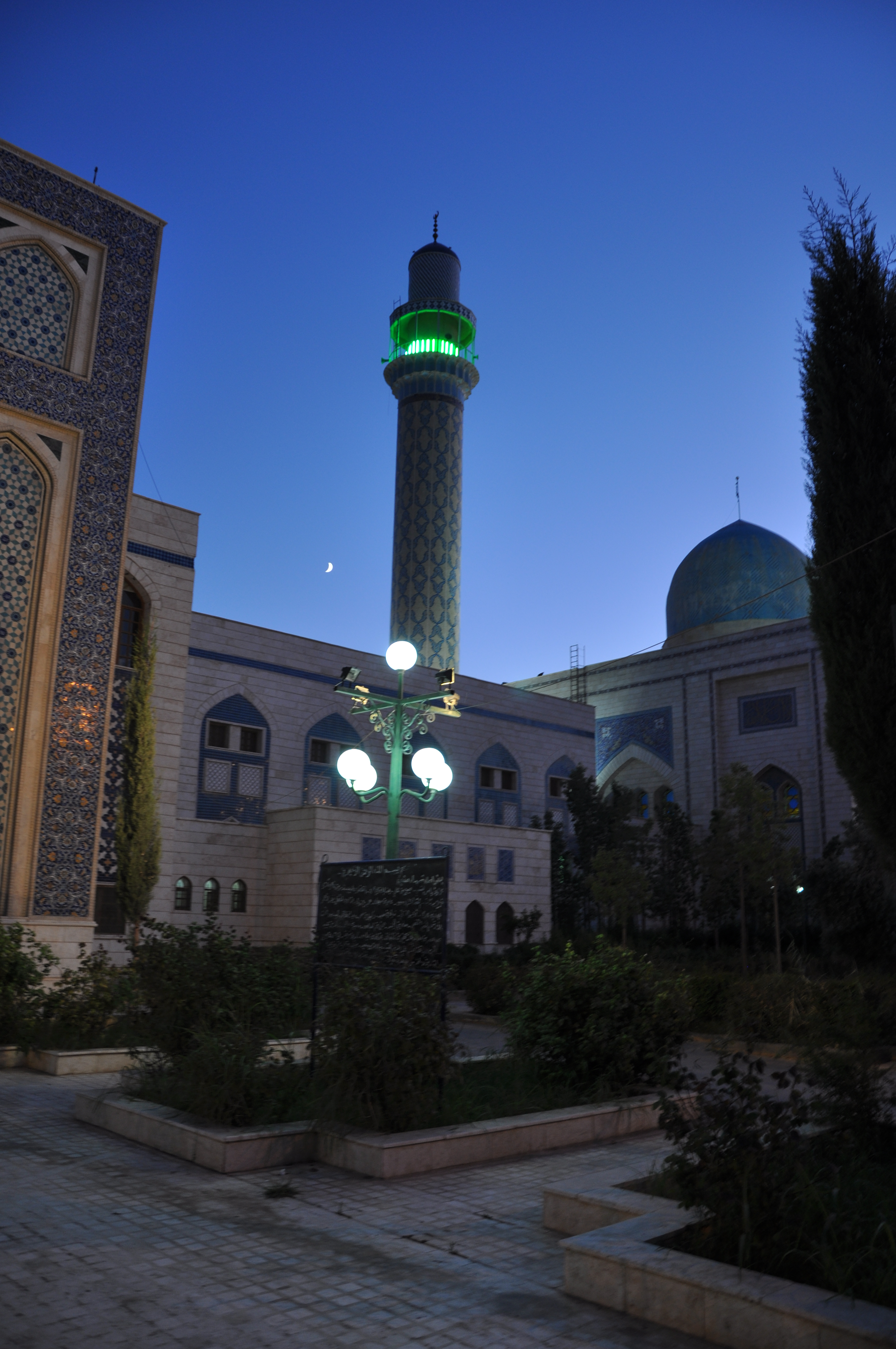
The mosque at night

== See also ==
- Shia Islam in Syria
- List of mosques in Syria
- Destruction of cultural heritage by the Islamic State
- Destruction of early Islamic heritage sites in Saudi Arabia
- Tell Abu Hureyra
