= Sumayya =

Companion of Muhammad (550–615)

Sumaiyah
- سُمَيَّة
- Born: c. 550 (72 BH)
- Died: c. 615 (7 BH); Mecca, Hejaz
- Known for: Being the first martyr of the Ummah of Muhammad, and a female disciple of his
- Spouse: Yasir ibn Amir
- Children: Ammar ibn Yasir
- Parent: Khabbaat (father)
- Relatives: Horayth ibn Yasir, Abdullah ibn Yasir (sons or stepsons)

Sumayyah (Arabic: سُمَيَّة; c. 550–615) was a companion of the Prophet Muhammad and the mother of Ammar Ibn Yasir, a prominent companion of the prophet. She was an Arab from the lineage of 'Ans, from the Madhij tribe of Yemen. She was born around 20 years before Prophet Muhammad and at the time of her martyrdom was an old, frail woman of around 65 years old.

Sumayyah was the first member of the Ummah (community) of the Islamic prophet Muhammad to be killed for her faith, hence a female martyr (Arabic: شهيدة, romanized: shahīda). Shortly afterward, her husband Yasir ibn Amir was also killed because of his conversion, becoming the first male martyr (Arabic: شهيد, romanized: shahīd). Her full name is given variously as Sumayya bint Khabbat or Sumayya bint Khayyat. She was the mother of Ammar ibn Yasir.

== Early life ==
She was a slave of Abu Hudhayfa ibn al-Mughira, a member of the Makhzum clan in Mecca. Her master gave her in marriage to Yasir ibn Amir, who was from the Malik clan of the Madh'hij tribe in Yemen. After coming to Mecca to look for a lost brother, he had decided to settle there under Abu Hudhayfa's protection. Sumayyah gave birth to their son Ammar c.566. Yasir also had two sons, Hurayth and Abdullah,

At a later date, Abu Hudhayfa freed both Sumayyah and her son Ammar; but they remained his clients for the rest of his life. It is said both that Abu Hudhayfa died "before Islam" and that he was "one of those who mocked the Prophet".

== Conversion to Islam ==
According to one tradition, Sumayyah was one of the first seven "to display Islam", the other six being Muhammad, Abu Bakr, Bilal, Khabbab, Suhayb and her son Ammar. "To display Islam" might refer to something other than conversion since, according to another tradition, Ammar was not converted until after the Muslims had entered the house of al-Arqam "after thirty men". Yasir and his son Abdullah also converted "on the rise of Islam", but Hurayth had been killed by the Dil clan before 610.

The Quraysh persecuted Muslims of low social rank. Sumayyah's family was vulnerable after the death of their patron, and it was other members of the Makhzum clan who tortured them to pressure them to abandon their faith. On one occasion she was put inside a pitcher full of water and lifted so that she could not escape. She, Yasir and Ammar were also forced to stand in the sun in the heat of the day dressed in mail-coats.

Although described as "a very old and frail woman", Sumayyah remained steadfast and refused to abandon Islam.

== Death ==
One evening, Amr ibn Hisham (commonly known as Abu Jahl), a chief of the Makhzum clan and a persistent enemy of the early Muslims, began to torture and verbally abuse Sumayyah and Yasir in front of a large crowd, pressuring them to recant their faith. When they refused and continued to praise Allah, he escalated the torture until they were near death. Abu Jahl then taunted Sumayyah, saying, "You are probably waiting for Yasir to die so you can marry Muhammad." Despite being barely conscious and severely wounded, she replied: "You are smaller in my eyes than a beetle on the ground I would [accidentally] step on." Enraged, Abu Jahl impaled her with his spear, killing her and making her the first martyr in Islam. Some sources state that he impaled her through her genitalia, while others report that he struck her midsection. After her death, her son Ammar ibn Yasir was made to stand in the hot sun in an effort to force him to abandon Islam.

When Abu Jahl was killed in the Battle of Badr, Muhammad said to Ammar, "Allah has killed your mother's killer."

Al-Tabari records an alternative account of Sumayyah's life. He states that after Yasir’s death, she married a Byzantine slave named Azraq, with whom she had a son named Salamah. Their descendants are said to have eventually married into the Banu Umayya. Al-Tabari also notes that some of these stories may reflect a confusion between two different Meccan women named Sumayyah.

== Historical references ==
The earliest reference to the murder of Sumayya is found in Ibn Ishaq's (died 761) biography of Muhammad, Sirat Rasul Allah ("Biography of the Messenger of God"). Her name Sumayyah is not explicitly mentioned in Ibn Ishaq; it is a deduction from the reference to her son as Ammar "son of" Sumayya. However, she is named as Sumayyah in the accounts of Ibn Saad and Tabari.

== See also ==
- Khadija bint Khuwaylid
- Halimah bint Abi Dhuayb
- Islamic perspective on the first martyr of mankind
- The martyrs of al-Ukhdud ("the Ditch", or a place near Najran)
