= The Four Companions =

Most loyal companions of Ali

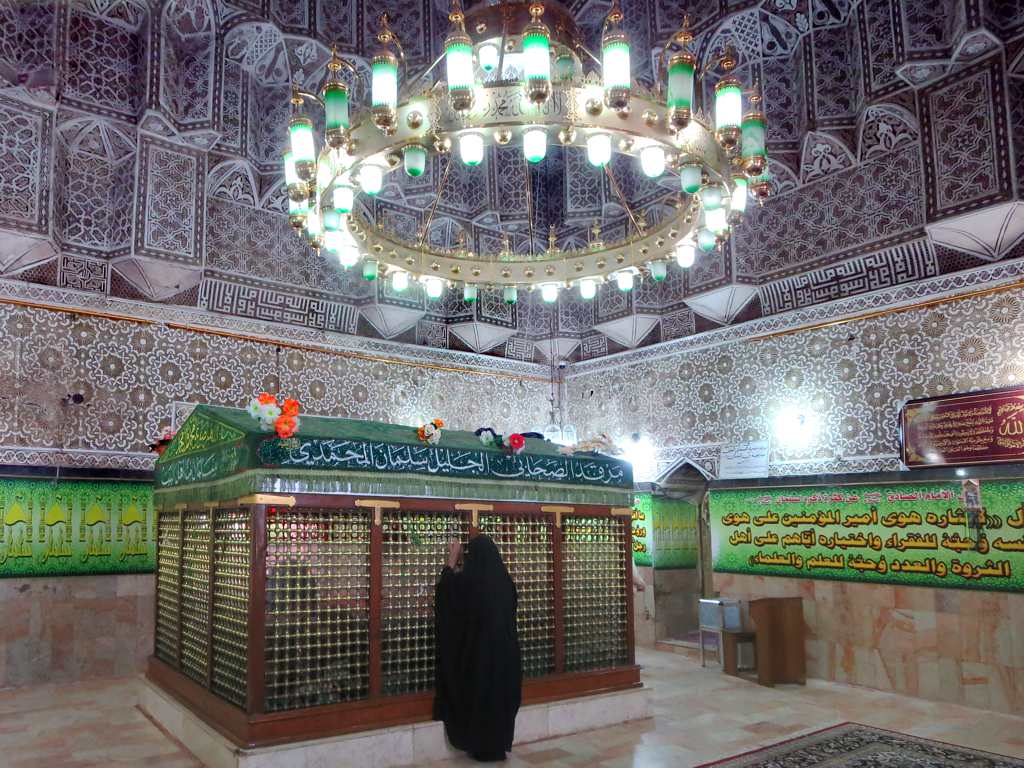
The ḍarīḥ over Salman al-Farisi's grave in Mada'in, Iraq

The Four Companions, also called the Four Pillars of the Sahaba, is a Shia term for the four Companions (ṣaḥāba) of the Islamic prophet Muhammad who are supposed to have stayed most loyal to Ali ibn Abi Talib after Muhammad's death in 632: Salman al-Fārisī, Abū Dharr al-Ghifāri, Miqdad ibn Aswād al-Kindi, and Ammār ibn Yāsir.

== Details ==
Salman is generally considered to be the loftiest amongst these elite four in Shia theology. It is narrated from Muhammad that:

Faith has ten grades, and Salman is on the tenth (i.e., highest) grade, Abu Dharr on the ninth, and Miqdad on the eighth grade.

Those among Muhammad's companions who were closest to Ali were called the shīʿat ʿAlī ('the partisans of Ali') during Muhammad's lifetime. The following hadith is narrated about them from Jabir al-Ansari:

The Messenger of Allah said: "Glad tidings Oh Ali! For verily you and your companions and your Shi'ah will be in Heaven."

These companions were later referred to as "The Real Shia." Abdullah ibn Abbas, Ubay ibn Ka'b, Bilal ibn Rabah, Muhammad ibn Abi Bakr, Malik al-Ashtar, and Hudhayfah ibn al-Yaman were other such partisans. However, it is only The Four Companions that are supposed to have attained distinction in their devotion to Ali.

== See also ==
- Hadith of the pond of Khumm
- Sulaym ibn Qays
