= Ammar ibn Yasir =

Companion of Muhammad

Ammar ibn Yasir عَمَّار بْن يَاسِر

Governor of Kufa
- Caliph: Umar
- Preceded by: Sa'd ibn Abi Waqqas
- Succeeded by: Al-Mughira ibn Shu'ba

Personal details
- Born: c. 567–570 CE Mecca, Hejaz, Arabia
- Died: July 657 Siffin, Syria
- Relations: Ans Madhhij (clan)
- Parent(s): Yasir ibn Amir; Sumayya

Military service
- Allegiance: Muhammad (610–632); Rashidun Caliphate (632–657)
- Years of service: 624–657
- Battles/wars: Muslim–Quraysh War; Battle of Badr; Ridda Wars; Battle of al-Yamama; First Fitna; Battle of the Camel; Battle of Siffin †

Ammar ibn Yasir (Arabic: عَمَّار بْن يَاسِر, romanized: ʿAmmār ibn Yāsir; c. 567/570 – July 657 CE) was a Sahabi (Companion) of the Islamic prophet Muhammad, and a commander in the early Muslim conquests. His parents, Sumayya and Yasir ibn Amir, were the first martyrs of the Ummah. Ammar converted to Islam by the invitation of Abu Bakr and was amongst the muhajirun. After the migration to Medina, he participated in building the Prophet's Mosque and fought in most of the early Muslim expeditions.

He fought in the Ridda wars under Caliph Abu Bakr (r. 632–634) and in the Muslim conquest of Iran under Caliph Umar (r. 634–644). Ammar served as governor of Kufa under Umar. Following Uthman's assassination, Ammar became a devout partisan of Caliph Ali (r. 656–661) and died while fighting on Ali's side in the Battle of Siffin.

== Before Islam ==
Ammar belonged to the Malik clan of the Madhhij tribe in Yemen. He later lived in the Hijaz region (in present-day Saudi Arabia). Born in or around the Year of the Elephant—the same year as Muhammad—he grew up in Mecca and served as one of the intermediaries in Muhammad's marriage to Khadijah bint Khuwaylid. His father, Yasir ibn Amir, came from the tribe of Qahtan in Yemen and migrated to Mecca, where he settled after marrying Sumayya, a slave woman. Ammar and his parents, Yasir and Sumayya, were slaves to Abu Huzaifa, and after his death they came under the control of Abu Jahl, who later became one of Islam's fiercest enemies and the notorious torturer of the family. Ammar's trust in and knowledge of Muhammad's credibility—even before his prophethood—encouraged him to follow Muhammad's prophetic visions as one of the earliest converts.

== After conversion to Islam ==
Belonging to the Banu Makhzum, Ammar was born in 567 to Yasir ibn Amir and Sumayya, both of whom were later brutally killed. At an early age, Ammar converted to Islam by the invitation of Abu Bakr, becoming one of the earliest Muslims. He became one of Muhammad's most prominent companions, participating in all his military campaigns and battles. Historically, Ammar ibn Yasir was the first Muslim to build a mosque.

ʿAmmār converted to Islam in 614 or 615 CE. This was during the period when the Quraysh were persecuting lower-class Muslims. As Ammar later recounted to his grandson: "I met Suhayb ibn Sinan at the door of the house of Al-Arqam while the Messenger of Allah was inside. I asked him, 'What do you want?' He replied, 'What do you want?' I answered, 'I want to go to Muhammad and listen to what he says.' He said, 'That is what I want.' We entered, and he presented Islam to us. We became Muslim and spent the day until evening, then went out concealing ourselves". Ammar's father, mother, and brother also became Muslims, though not at Abu Bakr's invitation.

When the Quraysh learned of Yasir's family's conversion, they became among "the victims who were tortured at Mecca to make them recant". The Makhzum clan would expose Ammar, his father, and his mother to the scorching heat of the day and torture them over open fire. Muhammad would pass by and say, "Patience, O family of Yasir! Your meeting-place will be Paradise" and "O fire! Be cool and harmless for ‘Ammar in the same manner in which you became cool and harmless for Ibrahim.” As a result, Ammar bore scars from this torture for the rest of his life.

Ammar was tortured "until he did not know what he was saying," as was his friend Suhayb. In this state, he temporarily maligned Muhammad and praised the pagan gods. Afterwards, he confessed to Muhammad. When asked, "How do you find your heart?" Ammar replied that he was still a Muslim at heart. Muhammad said all was well. The Qur'an verse "someone forced to do it whose heart remains at rest in its faith" (16:106) refers to Ammar. His mother was murdered by Abu Jahl for refusing to abandon Islam and is regarded as the first Muslim martyr. The opening verses of Surat Al-Ankabut (chapter 29: The Spider) were revealed in response to this event.

To escape the Meccans' torture, ibn Saad and Ibn Ishaq report that Ammar went to Abyssinia in 616.

=== Battles under Muhammad ===
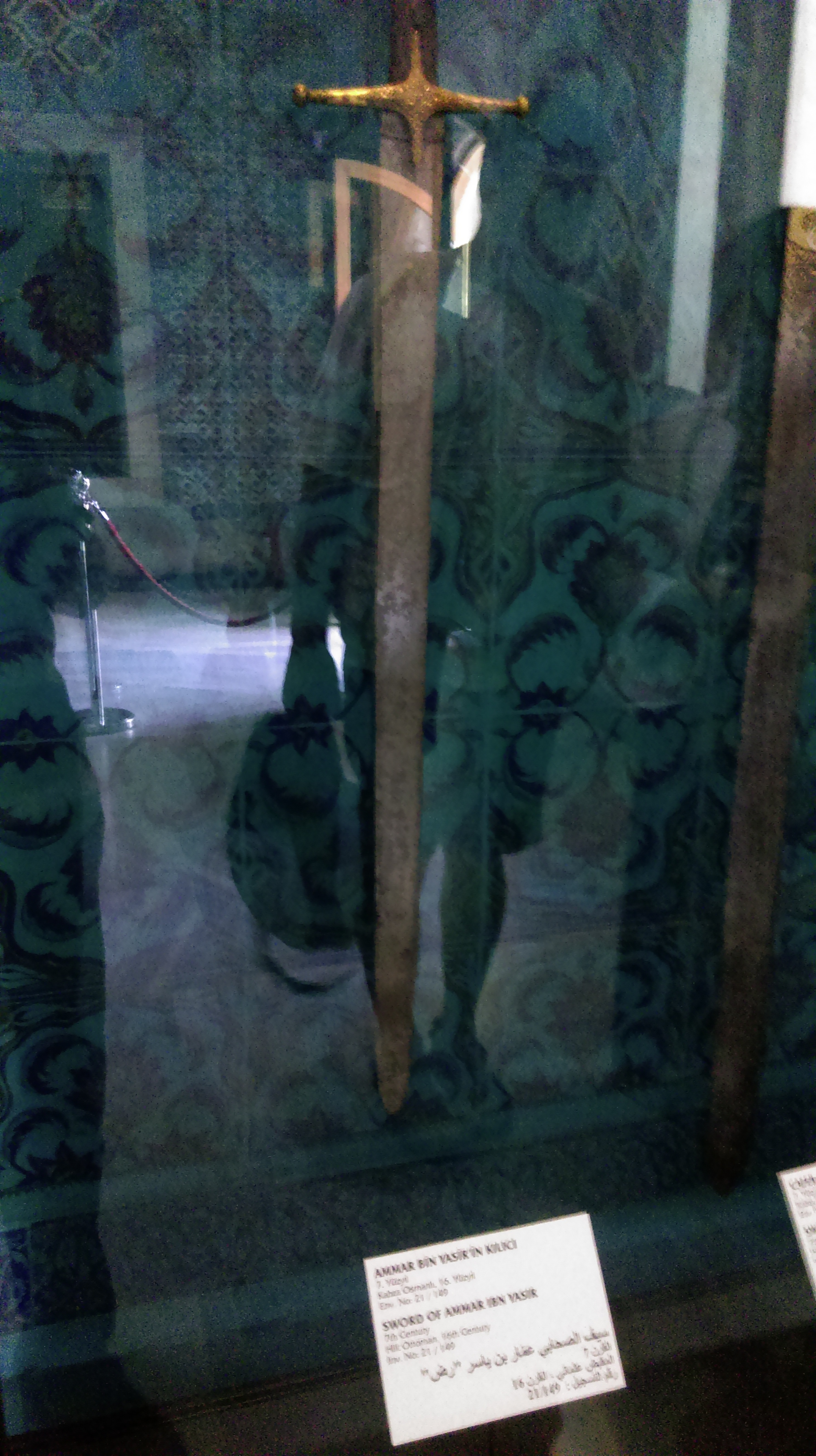
Ammar's sword

'Ammar was one of the few warriors to participate in the first major Islamic battle, the Battle of Badr, despite harsh conditions; and he continued to fight in all Muslim battles even after Muhammad's death.

In addition to his military role, Ammar's life illustrates a historically significant incident: while helping to build the Prophet's Mosque in Medina, he complained of being overloaded with bricks. Umm Salama, Muhammad's wife, witnessed Muhammad, who ran his hand through Ammar's curly hair and said: "Alas Ibn Sumayya! It is not they who will kill you but a wicked band of men." He took a stick in his hand, angry, and said, "What is wrong between them and Ammar? He invites them to Paradise while they invite him to hell." These reports, regarded as valid by both Sunnis and Shi'is, were later significant in discussions of succession and in interpreting Ammar's death at the Battle of Siffin.

== Role after Muhammad's death ==
Under Umar, he became governor of Kufa, however he was later removed from power.

During Uthman ibn Affan's election by the shura and before his eventual overthrowal, Ammar warningly predicted the upcoming conflict if anyone but Ali got elected and said that "If you do not want to cause a dispute among the Muslims, you have to give the pledge of allegiance to Ali". Ammar's relationship with Uthman ibn Affan deteriorated; although the details of their hostilities towards each other are debatable.

=== Battle of the Camel ===
Prior to the events of the Battle of the Camel, a shura was set up in an attempt to decide a successor after Uthman's death; at this meeting, attendees were not in agreement regarding whether retaliation for Uthman's murder was necessary or not. A report of ʻAlqama b. Waqqas al-Laythi of Kinana indicates that Ammar said that they should not seek revenge. Madelung interprets Ammar's behavior at this meeting indicating his desire to keep Talha from gaining power because Talha was in favor of seeking retaliation. Ammar would not have wanted this since "he had been the most active in inciting the rebels to action".

As the battle was developing, Ammar continued to show his support for Ali in multiple ways. Ali first sent him along with al-Hasan to Kufa in order to try to rally the Kufans to help during the upcoming battle. According to one report recorded by Al-Tabari, Ammar was questioned upon arrival for participating in Uthman's murder; however, he continued to try to convince the governor, Abu Musa, to take a stance instead of remaining impartial in the conflict. Al-Tabari reports how Abu Musa had encouraged the Kufans to remain neutral because he did not want to participate in inter-Muslim fighting, and he also believed that the Muslim community still owed their allegiance to Uthman because no new successor had been named. An additional transmission of the same event does not mention Ammar's actions against Uthman and instead focuses on his intentions to sway Abu Musa into action. During the actual battle, Ammar fought on Ali's side. Al-Tabari includes in his history an account in which al-Zubayr is told that Ammar is fighting alongside Ali, and this knowledge causes al-Zubayr to be fearful because he had been with Muhammad and Ammar when Muhammad had told Ammar that he would be killed by "transgressing group". Al-Tabari again includes multiple reports of the same event, which in this case is a moment during the battle in which Ammar and al-Zubayr confront each other. In both accounts Ammar approaches al-Zubayr to attack him, when al-Zubayr speaks. In the report from 'Umar b. Shabbah, al-Zubayr asks Ammar, "Do you want to kill me?" whereas in that from 'Amir b. Hafs, al-Zubayr asks, "Are you going to kill me, Abu al Yaqzan?" In both reports, Ammar's response is negative. At the end of the battle, which is successful for Ali's side, Ali orders Ammar and Muhammad ibn Abi Bakr to remove Aisha from her camel and bring her to 'Abdallah ibn Khalaf al-Khuza I's home in Basrah; because Al-Tabari repeatedly cites multiple reports from different transmitters, such variations in the consistency of the incidents' details -at that time- renders the reported nature of the consequential meeting of Ammar and ʻA'ishah unclear: for one account displays ʻA'ishah as hostile towards Ammar, whereas another later report describes the two as being on more amicable terms.

=== Battle of Siffin ===
Ammar died while fighting in the Battle of Siffin on Ali's side. According to Al-Mustadrak lil-Hakim, Ammar was slain by the Maviya forces Siffin. Siffin is believed to be what is now Abu Hureyra in Raqqa Governorate, Syria.

== Legacy ==
Ammar ibn Yasir
- Means of martyrdom: Killing in the Battle of Siffin, Ash-Sham
- Venerated in: Shia, Sunni, & Ibadi Islam; Druze

Ammar occupies a position of the highest prominence amongst Muslims. After the death of Muhammad, Ammar remained loyal to Ali and is referred to by Shia Muslims as one of the Four Companions. Muslims consider Ammar's ultimate fate to be unique among the fates of Muhammad's companions, for they perceive his death at the Battle of Siffin as the decisive distinguisher between the righteous group and the sinful one in the First Fitna.

In Shia Islam, Muhammad willed Ammar ibn Yasir as one of the four Sahabas whose guidance should be heeded by Muslims and also being those promised paradise. The Druze religion also venerates Ammar alongside some other companions.

When Ammar died, Mu'awiya referred to him as "one of Ali's two right hands" with the other being Malik al-Ashtar. Madelung quotes Al-Tabari by reporting what Mu'awiya said to his followers after killing Imam Ali's other loyal companion, Malik al-Ashtar: "Ali b. Abi Talib had two right hands. One of them was cut at Siffin', meaning Ammar b. Yasir, 'and the other today', meaning al-Ashtar". Despite Muʿāwiya's provocations, ʻAli ibn Abi Talib, the Caliph at the time, highly valued the support of 'Ammar ibn Yasir and Malik al-Ashtar nonetheless. ʻAli mourned 'Ammar's loss deeply.

Former Palestinian leader, Yasser Arafat, was nicknamed "Abu Ammar" after Ammar ibn Yasser.

=== Shrine ===
Ammar's shrine prior to its destruction

ʿAmmār's shrine, prior to its destruction, was frequently visited and paid tribute to by Muslims. Also buried in the shrine was the Tabi'i Owais al-Qarani.

The destruction of ʿAmmār's shrine was condemned by Muslims, and sparked outrage in various parts of the Muslim world.

== See also ==
- First Fitna
- List of Sahabah
  - Shia view of Sahaba
