= Uways al‑Qarani =

Muslim saint

Uways al-Qarani أُوَيْس ٱلْقَرَنِيّ
- Title: Khayr at-Tābiʿīn

Personal life
- Born: 593 Yemen
- Died: 657 Siffin
- Buried: Uwais al-Qarni Mosque, Raqqa, present-day Syria

Religious life
- Religion: Islam

ʾUways ibn ʿĀmir al-Qaranī (Arabic: أُوَيْس ٱبْن عَامِر ٱلْقَرَنِيّ) was Muslim military commander and one of the tabi'in who served in the Rashidun Caliphate. As a tabi'i, he never met the Islamic prophet Muhammad, though was sometimes honorarily counted as among the companions. He was a loyal companion of Ali, and was a commander in Ali's army at the Battle of Siffin, where he was martyred in 657. He's venerated by Shi'ites and Sunnis alike, and the Sufi Uwaysi tradition is named after him.

Among the Tabi'un, he is specially known as Khayr at-Tābiʿīn (Arabic: خَيْر ٱلتَّابِعِين, lit. 'the best of the Tabi‘un') and Sayyid at-Tabiʿīn fī Zamānah (Arabic: سَيِّد ٱلتَّابِعِين فِي زَمَانِه, lit. 'leader of the Tabi‘un of his era').

== Life ==
Muslim historians agreed Uways descended from the Murad tribe sub-branch. Furthermore, Arabian peninsula local traditions have traced the al-Qarani were a Nisba (onomastics) of Ibb city in Yemen, the place where Uways was born.

Uways's father, Amir, was a strong believer in Islam. He died when Uways was still young and Uways was raised by his mother alone; He never physically met Muhammad, even though he lived in the same era. However, he met Muhammad's companion Umar and is therefore seen as from among the Tabi'un. Abu Nu'aym al-Isfahani has recorded the strong sense of filial piety by Uways preoccupied him to leave his mother to meet Muhammad, thus, he sacrificed the chance to reach the rank of companions of Muhammad in an effort to take care of his elderly mother.

During the caliphate of Umar, according to Usayr ibn Jabir recorded by Muslim ibn al-Hajjaj, every time Umar received a batch of soldiers who volunteer from Yemen to be sent for the Muslim conquest of Persia, he always asked if there is Uways among them, as Umar searching Uways by relying on a Hadith regarding Uways will reach him one day, Ibn al-Jawzi recorded that Umar was urged by Muhammad during his life, that someday in the future he should ask Uways for prayer. In the next year after his meeting with Umar, during the Hajj season, it is recorded that Umar still remembered and asked any pilgrims from Kufa about the condition of Uways.

Uways reside in Kufa around the year 19 AH (640 AD) and participated in the battle of Nahavand against the Sassanid army. However, as he became famous in Kufa due to a recommendation from Hadith which was told by caliph Umar, Uways moved to an unspecified location and was lost from the trace of historians.

Uways appeared again in history during the caliphate of Ali, when most of medieval scholars recorded Uways met his demise during the battle of Siffin, while some others reported he fell in battle during the Muslim conquest of Azerbaijan.

== Legacy ==
Uways al-Qarani is mainly greatly revered for his historical piety, particularly his legendary filial piety, which prompted Muslim communities in later eras to express their veneration in various ways as Muhammad has given the glad tiding about his moral and ethical conduct as Mumin. He was bestowed the title of Khayr al-Tabi'een or best Tabi'in by Muhammad himself in a series of Hadith narrations recorded by Sahih Muslim and Kitab al-Wafi bi'l-Wafayat of Safadi.

His humility for not seeking fame and his filial piety prompted Arabian poets to bestow him as "Majhul an fi al Ardh, Ma'rufin fi as-Samaa" which translates as "unknown on earth (among humans), but famously acknowledged on heavens (by Allah and His Angels)".

The appraisal of him as the best Tabi'un came from an-Nawawi in his book, Al-Minhaj bi Sharh Sahih Muslim, in a part of the commentary of Hadith came from Umar which recorded by Muslim ibn al-Hajjaj which mentioned the prophecy from Muhammad who praised Uways, despite never having seen him. While ad-Dhahabi praised Uways as “The ascetic role model, the leader of the Tabi'un in his time". Al-Hakim al-Nishapuri gave a short commentary in his book, that Uwais was "the monk of Ummah".

Another virtue appraised for Uways is the weak hadith of ‘Abdullah ibn Abi’l-Jad‘a’ about the virtue of intercession from Uways alone was better than whole Banu Tamim, which commentary by Hasan al-Basri that the Hadith were particularly come appraisal for Uways. In architectural legacy, there was the mosque that was named after Uways in Mosul, Iraq, but it was destroyed in 2014.

In modern times, Muhammad Hassan Haniff asserted the case of Uways taking care of his mother alone and not migrating to Medina to refute the extremist ideology of ISIS, pointing out the conduct of Uways of not immediately migrating to the territory of the caliphate and not immediately engaging in Jihad during the first years of Islam, prioritizing his elderly mother, as agreed by Muhammad and the companions, as an argument that ISIS ideology was flawed according to Islamic teaching.

=== Sufi orders ===
The Uwaysi form of Islamic mysticism was named after Uways, as it refers to the transmission of spiritual knowledge between two individuals without the need for physical interaction between them all. For example, the contemporary "Silsila Uwaysi" order led by Shaykh Banaras Uwaysi is active in the United Kingdom.

=== Shrine ===
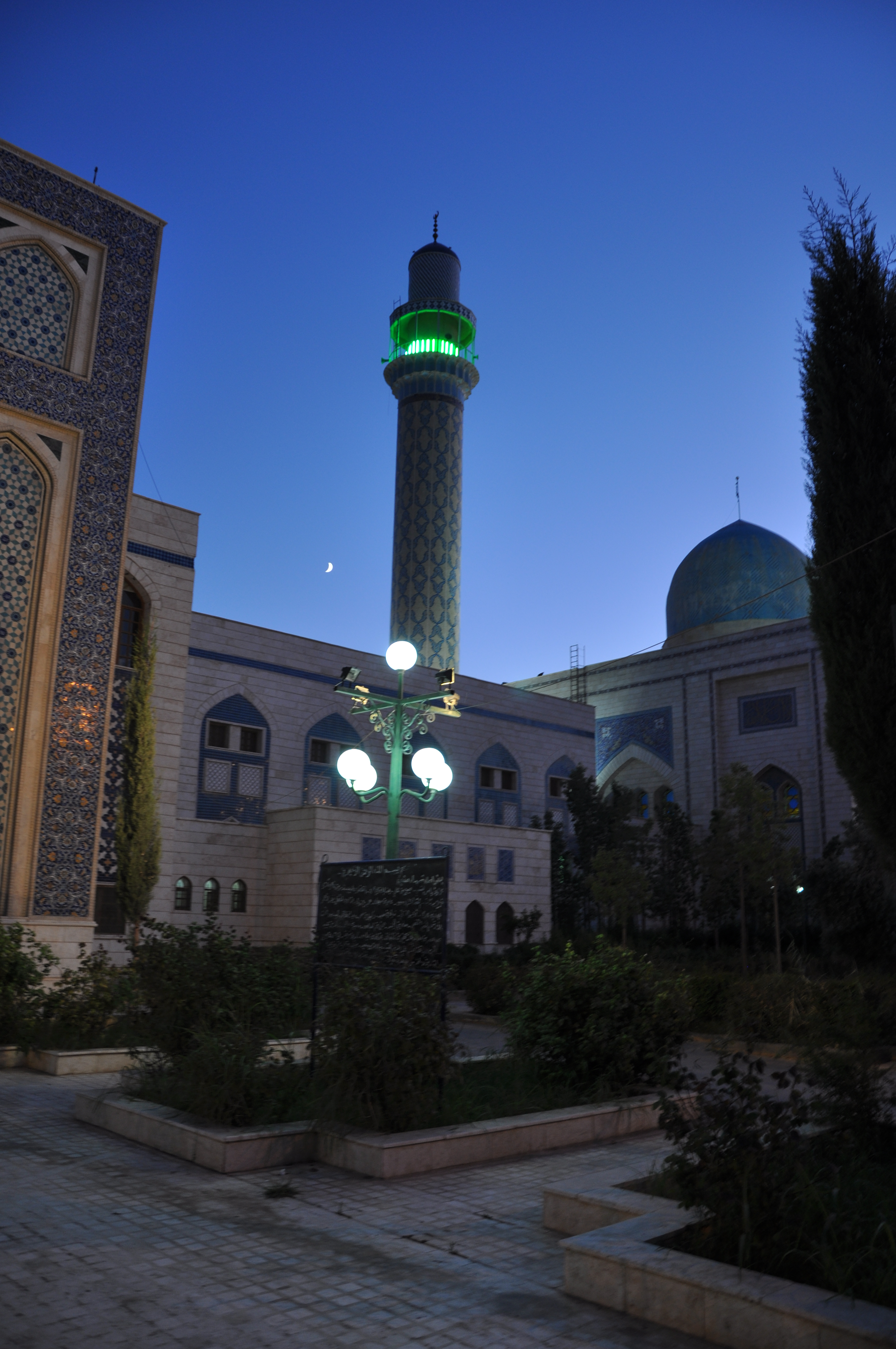
Uwaysi Mosque in 2009, prior to its demolishment

Uways al-Qarani Mosque in Raqqa (now in Syria) is his burial site, as he died during the Battle of Siffin there. It was destroyed by the ISIS in 2013, and is currently awaiting reconstruction. Also buried in the shrine was the Sahabi Ammar ibn Yasir.

There is also a shrine for him in Mosul, known as the Sultan Wais Mosque.
