= Al-Ansi =

Al-ʿAnsī (Arabic: العنسي) is an ancient and prolific tribe originating in the Al Jawf Governorate region of Yemen. After the final breach of the Marib Dam about 570 CE, its members spread across the Arabian Peninsula. Today, members of the tribe are mostly situated in ʿAns, Yemen, with some tribe members residing in the United Arab Emirates, Saudi Arabia, Qatar, Oman and Kuwait.

Famous members of the al-ʿAnsī tribe include:

- ʻAmmār ibn Yāsir Al-Ansi, who fled Yemen to Mecca and became a companion of Muhammad
- Aswad Ansi, a competing prophet to Muhammad, who sent Fayruz al-Daylami to assassinate him under the supervision and planning of Qais bin Hubaira.
