= Al-Mada'in District =

Coordinates: 33.09947°N 44.58561°E

Al-Mada'in District Arabic: المدائن
- District
- Interactive map of Al-Mada'in District
- Country: Iraq
- Governorate: Baghdad
- Seat: Salman Pak

Area
  - Total: 1,411 km^{2} (545 sq mi)

Population (2024)
  - Total: 687,060
  - Density: 486.9/km^{2} (1,261/sq mi)
- Time zone: UTC+3 (AST)

Al-Mada'in District is a district of the Baghdad Governorate, Iraq. It includes the city of Salman Pak, which incorporates the ancient ruins of Al-Mada'in, and the oldest freestanding mud brick arch in the world. Other metropolitan areas include Jisr Dyala, an urban district that borders the Baghdad city district of (???), the northern village of Nahrawahn with its major brickworks, and the central village of Wahedah that sits astride the Basrah Highway into Wasit Province.
